= 2020–21 Mid-American Conference men's basketball season =

- League: NCAA Division I
- Sport: Basketball
- Teams: 12

Regular season
- Champions: Toledo
- Season MVP: Marreon Jackson

Tournament
- Champions: Ohio
- Runners-up: Buffalo
- Finals MVP: Jason Preston

Mid-American men's basketball seasons
- 2019–20 2021–22

2020–21 Mid-American Conference men's basketball standings
	Conf.				Overall
Team	W		L	PCT	W		L	PCT
Toledo	15	–	4	.789	21	–	9	.700
Buffalo	12	–	5	.706	16	–	9	.640
Akron	12	–	6	.667	15	–	8	.652
Kent State	12	–	6	.667	15	–	8	.652
Ohio †	9	–	5	.643	17	–	8	.680
Bowling Green	10	–	8	.556	14	–	12	.538
Miami (OH)	9	–	8	.529	12	–	11	.522
Ball State	8	–	9	.471	10	–	13	.435
Western Michigan	4	–	12	.250	5	–	16	.238
Eastern Michigan	3	–	11	.214	6	–	12	.333
Central Michigan	3	–	13	.188	7	–	16	.304
Northern Illinois	2	–	12	.143	3	–	16	.158
† 2021 MAC tournament winner

The 2020–21 Mid-American Conference men's basketball season began with practices in October 2020, followed by the start of the 2020–21 NCAA Division I men's basketball season in November. Conference play began in January 2021 and concluded in March 2021. In a season limited due to the ongoing COVID-19 pandemic, Toledo won the regular season title with a conference record of 15–4. Ohio won the MAC tournament and represented the MAC in the NCAA tournament where they defeated No. 4-seeded Virginia in the first round before falling to No. 5-seeded Creighton in the second round. Toledo went to the NIT where they lost to Richmond in the first round.

== Preseason awards ==
The preseason coaches' poll and league awards were announced by the league office on November 19, 2020.

=== Preseason men's basketball coaches poll ===
(First place votes in parentheses)

1. Bowling Green (8) 132
2. Ohio (1) 117
3. Akron (2) 115
4. Buffalo 109
5. Ball State 104
6. Toledo (1) 93
7. Kent State 65
8. Eastern Michigan 57
9. Miami 48
10. Northern Illinois 43
11. Central Michigan 40
12. Western Michigan 13

MAC tournament champions: Bowling Green (4), Akron (2), Ball State (1), Buffalo (1), Eastern Michigan (1), Kent State (1), Miami (1), Toledo (1)

=== Honors ===
Honor	Recipient
Preseason All-MAC First Team	Loren Cristian Jackson, Akron
Preseason All-MAC First Team	Justin Turner, Bowling Green
Preseason All-MAC First Team	Jayvon Graves, Buffalo
Preseason All-MAC First Team	Jason Preston, Ohio
Preseason All-MAC First Team	Marreon Jackson, Toledo
Preseason All-MAC Second Team	Ishmael El-Amin, Ball State
Preseason All-MAC Second Team	Daeqwon Plowden, Bowling Green
Preseason All-MAC Second Team	Josh Mballa, Buffalo
Preseason All-MAC Second Team	Danny Pippen, Kent State
Preseason All-MAC Second Team	Ben Vander Plas, Ohio

== Conference matrix ==
	Akron	Ball State	Bowling Green	Buffalo	Central Michigan	Eastern Michigan	Kent State	Miami (OH)	Northern Illinois	Ohio	Toledo	Western Michigan
vs. Akron	–	0−2	1−1	1−0	0−1	1−1	0−2	0−1	1−1	1–1	1−1	0–1
vs. Ball State	2–0	–	1–1	2–0	0−1	0−1	0−1	1−0	0−2	2–0	1−1	0–1
vs. Bowling Green	1–1	1–1	–	0–2	0−2	0−1	2−0	2−0	0–1	0–1	1–1	1–1
vs. Buffalo	0–1	0–2	2–0	–	0−1	0−1	1−1	0–2	0–1	1–1	1–0	0–1
vs. Central Michigan	1–0	1−0	2−0	1−0	–	0–2	2–0	1−0	1–0	1–0	1–1	2–0
vs. Eastern Michigan	1–1	1−0	1−0	1−0	2–0	–	1−0	1–0	0–1	1–0	2–0	0–1
vs. Kent State	2–0	1−0	0−2	1−1	0–2	0−1	–	0–2	0−1	0–1	2–0	0–2
vs. Miami (OH)	1–0	0–1	0−2	2–0	0−1	0–1	2–0	–	0–2	1–0	2−0	0–2
vs. Northern Illinois	1–1	2–0	1–0	1–0	0–1	1–0	1−0	2–0	–	1–0	1–0	1–0
vs. Ohio	1−1	0−2	1−0	1–1	0–1	0–1	1−0	0−1	0−1	–	1–0	0–1
vs. Toledo	1–1	1–1	1–1	0−1	1−1	0–2	0–2	0−2	0−1	0–1	−	0–2
vs. Western Michigan	1–0	1–0	1–1	1−0	0−2	1–0	2–0	2−0	0−1	1–0	2–0	-
Total	12–6	8–9	10–8	12–5	3–13	3–11	12–6	9–8	2–12	9–5	15–4	4–12

== All-MAC awards ==
=== Mid-American men's basketball weekly awards ===
Week	Player(s) of the Week	School	Newcomer of the Week	School
Nov 30	Jason Preston	Ohio		
Dec 7	Justin Turner	Bowling Green		
Dec 14	Danny Pippen	Kent State		
Dec 21	Marreon Jackson	Toledo		
Dec 28	Loren Cristian Jackson	Akron		
Jan 4	Loren Cristian Jackson	Akron		
Jan 11	Josh Mballa	Buffalo		
Jan 18	Danny Pippen	Kent State		
Jan 25	Dae Dae Grant	Miami		
Feb 1	Danny Pippen	Kent State		
Feb 8	Greg Lee	Western Michigan		
Feb 15	Daeqwon Plowden	Bowling Green		
Feb 22	Marreon Jackson	Toledo		
Mar 1	Jarron Coleman	Ball State		
Mar 8	Jayvon Graves	Buffalo		

== Postseason ==
=== Postseason awards ===
1. Coach of the Year: Tod Kowalczyk, Toledo
2. Player of the Year: Marreon Jackson, Toledo
3. Freshman of the Year: Ryan Rollins, Toledo
4. Defensive Player of the Year: Josh Mballa, Buffalo
5. Sixth Man of the Year: Trey Diggs, Bowling Green

=== Honors ===
Honor	Recipient
Postseason All-MAC First Team	Loren Cristian Jackson, Akron
Postseason All-MAC First Team	Justin Turner, Bowling Green
Postseason All-MAC First Team	Danny Pippen, Kent State
Postseason All-MAC First Team	Jason Preston, Ohio
Postseason All-MAC First Team	Marreon Jackson, Toledo
Postseason All-MAC Second Team	Ishmael El-Amin, Ball State
Postseason All-MAC Second Team	Josh Mballa, Buffalo
Postseason All-MAC Second Team	Jeenathan Williams, Buffalo
Postseason All-MAC Second Team	Jayvon Graves, Buffalo
Postseason All-MAC Second Team	Spencer Littleson, Toledo
Postseason All-MAC Third Team	Daeqwon Plowden, Bowling Green
Postseason All-MAC Third Team	Michael Nuga, Kent State
Postseason All-MAC Third Team	Dae Dae Grant, Miami
Postseason All-MAC Third Team	Ben Vander Plas, Ohio
Postseason All-MAC Third Team	Dwight Wilson III, Ohio
All-MAC Freshman Team	Josiah Fulcher, Bowling Green
All-MAC Freshman Team	Kaden Matheny, Bowling Green
All-MAC Freshman Team	Aundre Polk, Central Michigan
All-MAC Freshman Team	Mark Sears, Ohio
All-MAC Freshman Team	Ryan Rollins, Toledo
All-MAC Defensive Team	Enrique Freeman, Akron
All-MAC Defensive Team	Josh Mballa, Buffalo
All-MAC Defensive Team	Malique Jacobs, Kent State
All-MAC Defensive Team	Lunden McDay, Ohio
All-MAC Defensive Team	Spencer Littleson, Toledo

== See also ==
- 2020–21 Mid-American Conference women's basketball season
