= 2020–21 Eastern Michigan Eagles men's basketball team =

American college basketball season

2020–21 Eastern Michigan Eagles men's basketball
- Conference: Mid-American Conference
- Record: 6–12 (3–11 MAC)
- Head coach: Rob Murphy (10th season)
- Assistant coaches: Kevin Mondro; Matt Cline; Tony Harvey
- Home arena: Convocation Center

2020–21 Mid-American Conference men's basketball standings
	Conf.				Overall
Team	W		L	PCT	W		L	PCT
Toledo	15	–	4	.789	21	–	9	.700
Buffalo	12	–	5	.706	16	–	9	.640
Akron	12	–	6	.667	15	–	8	.652
Kent State	12	–	6	.667	15	–	8	.652
Ohio †	9	–	5	.643	17	–	8	.680
Bowling Green	10	–	8	.556	14	–	12	.538
Miami (OH)	9	–	8	.529	12	–	11	.522
Ball State	8	–	9	.471	10	–	13	.435
Western Michigan	4	–	12	.250	5	–	16	.238
Eastern Michigan	3	–	11	.214	6	–	12	.333
Central Michigan	3	–	13	.188	7	–	16	.304
Northern Illinois	2	–	12	.143	3	–	16	.158
† 2021 MAC tournament winner

The 2020–21 Eastern Michigan Eagles men's basketball team represented Eastern Michigan University during the 2020–21 NCAA Division I men's basketball season. The Eagles, led by 10th-year head coach Rob Murphy, played their home games at the Convocation Center in Ypsilanti, Michigan as members of the Mid-American Conference. Starting this season, the MAC announced the removal of divisions. They finished the season 6–12, 3–11 in MAC play to finish in 10th place. They failed to qualify for the MAC tournament.

Following the season, the school announced it as parting ways with Murphy after 10 seasons. On April 12, 2021, the school hired EMU alum and former Kent State, Arkansas, and South Florida head coach Stan Heath as the team's new head coach.

== Previous season ==
The Eagles finished the 2019–20 NCAA Division I men's basketball season 16–16, 6–12 in MAC play to finish in a tie for last place in the West Division. They lost in the first round of the MAC tournament to Kent State.

== Roster ==
2020–21 Eastern Michigan Eagles men's basketball team
Players
Coaches

Pos.	#	Name	Height	Weight	Year	Previous school	Hometown
G	0	Yeikson Montero	6 ft 5 in (1.96 m)	205 lb (93 kg)	Sr	Pensacola State	Santo Domingo, Dominican Republic
F	1	Ty Groce	6 ft 8 in (2.03 m)	215 lb (98 kg)	RS Sr	Lincoln High School	Ypsilanti, Michigan
G/F	2	Miles Gibson	6 ft 6 in (1.98 m)	195 lb (88 kg)	RS Jr	Northwest Kansas Tech	Richmond, Virginia
G	3	Drew Lowder	6 ft 0 in (1.83 m)	170 lb (77 kg)	So	Holy Cross	Jackson, Michigan
G	4	Bryce McBride	6 ft 2 in (1.88 m)	165 lb (75 kg)	Jr	Dyersburg State Community College	Jackson, Tennessee
G	5	Noah Morgan	6 ft 5 in (1.96 m)	180 lb (82 kg)	Sr	Northwest Florida State	Mount Vernon, New York
G	10	Darion Spottsville	6 ft 3 in (1.91 m)	195 lb (88 kg)	Sr	South Mountain Community College	Phoenix, Arizona
G	12	Andrew Wells	6 ft 1 in (1.85 m)	160 lb (73 kg)	Fr	International Sports Academy	East Lansing, Michigan
G	13	Chris James	6 ft 2 in (1.88 m)	170 lb (77 kg)	So	St. John Bosco High School	Long Beach, California
F	15	Axel Okongo	7 ft 0 in (2.13 m)	245 lb (111 kg)	Sr	Missouri	Saâcy-sur-Marne, France
F	21	James Love III	6 ft 11 in (2.11 m)	225 lb (102 kg)	RS Sr	Kansas State	Fort Lauderdale, Florida
F	23	Thomas Binelli	6 ft 10 in (2.08 m)	235 lb (107 kg)	Sr	Monroe College	Bologna, Italy
F	33	Derek Ballard Jr.	6 ft 8 in (2.03 m)	225 lb (102 kg)	RS Jr	Southfield-Lathrup High School	Southfield, Michigan

Head coach

- Rob Murphy (Central State)

Assistant coach(es)

- Kevin Mondro (Detroit Mercy)
- Matt Kline (South Alabama)
- Tony Harvey (Cameron)

Legend

- (C) Team captain
- (S) Suspended
- (I) Ineligible
- (W) Walk-on
- Injured
- Current redshirt

Roster
Last update: March 11, 2021

== Schedule and results ==
Date time, TV	Rank^{#}	Opponent^{#}	Result	Record	Site (attendance) city, state
Regular season
November 25, 2020*; 6:00 pm, BTN		at No. 13 Michigan State	L 67–83	0–1	Breslin Center; East Lansing, MI
December 4, 2020; 7:00 pm, ESPN3		Toledo	L 74–91	0–2 (0–1)	Convocation Center; Ypsilanti, MI
December 9, 2020; 7:00 pm, ESPN3		Adrian	W 95–35	1–2	Convocation Center; Ypsilanti, MI
December 16, 2020; 8:00 pm, ESPN3		Valparaiso	Canceled due to COVID-19 issues		Athletics–Recreation Center; Valparaiso, IN
December 27, 2020; 2:00 pm		Olivet	W 94–65	2–2	Convocation Center; Ypsilanti, MI
December 29, 2020; 7:00 pm, ESPN3		Central Michigan	L 60–87	2–3 (0–2)	Convocation Center; Ypsilanti, MI
January 2, 2021; 5:30 pm, ESPN3		Kent State	Canceled due to COVID-19 issues		Convocation Center; Ypsilanti, MI
January 5, 2021; 7:00 pm		Akron	Canceled due to COVID-19 issues		Convocation Center; Ypsilanti, MI
January 9, 2021; 2:00 pm, ESPN+		Akron	W 71–59	3–3 (1–2)	Convocation Center; Ypsilanti, MI
January 12, 2021; 7:00 pm, ESPN3		at Toledo	L 63–96	3–4 (1–3)	Savage Arena; Toledo, OH
January 14, 2021; 7:00 pm, ESPN3		Calvin	W 67–56	4–4	Convocation Center; Ypsilanti, MI
January 16, 2021; 4:30 pm, ESPN3		at Central Michigan	L 64–75	4–5 (1–4)	McGuirk Arena; Mount Pleasant, MI
January 19, 2021; 7:00 pm		Western Michigan	Postponed due to COVID-19 issues		Convocation Center; Ypsilanti, MI
January 21, 2021; 2:00 pm, ESPN+		at Buffalo	L 77–92	4–6 (1–5)	Alumni Arena; Amherst, NY
January 23, 2021; 5:30 pm, ESPN3		Miami (OH)	L 63–85	4–7 (1–6)	Convocation Center (100); Ypsilanti, MI
January 26, 2021; 7:30 pm, ESPN3		at Akron	L 65–86	4–8 (1–7)	James A. Rhodes Arena; Akron, OH
January 29, 2021		at Northern Illinois	Postponed due to COVID-19 issues		Convocation Center; DeKalb, IL
February 2, 2021; 7:00 pm		Bowling Green	Postponed due to COVID-19 issues		Convocation Center; Ypsilanti, MI
February 6, 2021; 2:00 pm		at Ohio	Postponed due to COVID-19 issues		Convocation Center; Athens, OH
February 9, 2021; 7:00 pm		at Miami (OH)	Canceled due to COVID-19 issues		Millett Hall; Oxford, OH
February 13, 2021; 1:00 pm		Ball State	Postponed due to COVID-19 issues		Convocation Center; Ypsilanti, MI
February 16, 2021; 5:00 pm, ESPN3		Buffalo	Postponed due to COVID-19 issues		Convocation Center; Ypsilanti, MI
February 20, 2021; 2:00 pm, ESPN3		at Kent State	L 51–64	4–9 (1–8)	MAC Center; Kent, OH
February 23, 2021; 7:00 pm		Bowling Green	L 69–82	4–10 (1–9)	Convocation Center (125); Ypsilanti, MI
February 25, 2021; 2:00 pm, ESPN3		at Ohio	L 67–86	4–11 (1–10)	Convocation Center; Athens, OH
February 27, 2021; 1:00 pm, ESPN3		Northern Illinois	W 91–57	5–11 (2–10)	Convocation Center; Ypsilanti, MI
March 2, 2021; 7:00 pm, ESPN3		at Ball State	L 65–100	5–12 (2–11)	Worthen Arena (92); Muncie, IN
March 5, 2021; 7:00 pm, ESPN3		at Western Michigan	W 64–63	6–12 (3–11)	University Arena (100); Kalamazoo, MI
*Non-conference game. ^{#}Rankings from AP Poll. (#) Tournament seedings in parentheses. All times are in Eastern Time.
