= 2020–21 Western Michigan Broncos men's basketball team =

American college basketball season

2020–21 Western Michigan Broncos men's basketball
- Conference: Mid-American Conference
- Record: 5–16 (4–12 MAC)
- Head coach: Clayton Bates (1st season)
- Assistant coaches: Thomas Kelley; Kristof Kendrick; Jacob Bullock
- Home arena: University Arena

2020–21 Mid-American Conference men's basketball standings
| | Conf. | | | | Overall |
| Team | W | | L | PCT | W | | L | PCT |
|---|---|---|---|---|---|---|---|---|
| Toledo | 15 | – | 4 | .789 | 21 | – | 9 | .700 |
| Buffalo | 12 | – | 5 | .706 | 16 | – | 9 | .640 |
| Akron | 12 | – | 6 | .667 | 15 | – | 8 | .652 |
| Kent State | 12 | – | 6 | .667 | 15 | – | 8 | .652 |
| Ohio † | 9 | – | 5 | .643 | 17 | – | 8 | .680 |
| Bowling Green | 10 | – | 8 | .556 | 14 | – | 12 | .538 |
| Miami (OH) | 9 | – | 8 | .529 | 12 | – | 11 | .522 |
| Ball State | 8 | – | 9 | .471 | 10 | – | 13 | .435 |
| Western Michigan | 4 | – | 12 | .250 | 5 | – | 16 | .238 |
| Eastern Michigan | 3 | – | 11 | .214 | 6 | – | 12 | .333 |
| Central Michigan | 3 | – | 13 | .188 | 7 | – | 16 | .304 |
| Northern Illinois | 2 | – | 12 | .143 | 3 | – | 16 | .158 |
† 2021 MAC tournament winner

The 2020–21 Western Michigan Broncos men's basketball team represented Western Michigan University in the 2020–21 NCAA Division I men's basketball season. The Broncos, led by first-year head coach Clayton Bates, played their home games at University Arena in Kalamazoo, Michigan as members of the Mid-American Conference. In a season limited due to the ongoing COVID-19 pandemic, they finished the season 5–16, 4–12 in MAC play to finish in ninth place. As a result, they failed to qualify for the MAC tournament.

The MAC announced the removal of division play in-conference beginning this year.

== Previous season ==
The Broncos finished the 2019–20 season 13–19, 6–12 in MAC play to finish in a tie for fifth place in the West Division. They lost in the first round of the MAC tournament to Toledo.

On March 11, 2020, the school announced that Steve Hawkins would not be returning as head coach, ending his 17-year tenure with the team. On April 2, it was announced that long-time assistant Clayton Bates would be named the Broncos' next head coach.

== Roster ==
2020–21 Western Michigan Broncos men's basketball team
Players
Coaches

| Pos. | # | Name | Height | Weight | Year | Previous school | Hometown |
|---|---|---|---|---|---|---|---|
| F | 0 | Kawanise Wilkins | 6 ft 5 in (1.96 m) | 230 lb (104 kg) | RS Jr | Barton Community College | Chicago, Illinois |
| F | 1 | Chase Barrs | 6 ft 9 in (2.06 m) | 210 lb (95 kg) | So | Berkeley Preparatory School | Tampa, Florida |
| G | 2 | Adrian Martin | 6 ft 3 in (1.91 m) | 175 lb (79 kg) | Jr | Lanier High School | Sugar Hill, Georgia |
| G | 3 | B. Artis White | 6 ft 0 in (1.83 m) | 150 lb (68 kg) | So | Canton High School | Canton, Michigan |
| G | 4 | Daylan Hamilton | 6 ft 3 in (1.91 m) | — | Fr | Klein Forest High School | Houston, Texas |
| G | 10 | Luke Toliver | 6 ft 3 in (1.91 m) | 190 lb (86 kg) | Jr | Paw Paw High School | Paw Paw, Michigan |
| G | 11 | Rafael Cruz Jr. | 6 ft 1 in (1.85 m) | 185 lb (84 kg) | Sr | Triton College | Chicago, Illinois |
| G | 12 | Josiah Freeman | 6 ft 4 in (1.93 m) | — | Fr | Manassas Park High School | Manassas Park, Virginia |
| F | 15 | Patrick Emilien | 6 ft 6 in (1.98 m) | 205 lb (93 kg) | Jr | Toronto Basketball Academy | Toronto, Ontario, Canada |
| G | 20 | William Boyer-Richard | 6 ft 1 in (1.85 m) | 190 lb (86 kg) | Jr | Collège Jean-de-Brébeuf | Drummondville, Quebec |
| C | 22 | Titus Wright | 6 ft 8 in (2.03 m) | 250 lb (113 kg) | So | Thomasville High School | Thomasville, Georgia |
| F | 23 | Greg Lee | 6 ft 9 in (2.06 m) | — | Sr | Cal State Bakersfield | Rockford, Illinois |
| G | 24 | Jaylon Holmes | 6 ft 5 in (1.96 m) | — | RS So | Lincoln Trail College | Gary, Indiana |
| G | 30 | Jason Whitens | 6 ft 4 in (1.93 m) | 185 lb (84 kg) | RS Jr | Powers North Central High School | Powers, Michigan |
| F | 34 | Danny Kolp | 6 ft 8 in (2.03 m) | 210 lb (95 kg) | Jr | Northwood | Petoskey, Michigan |

Head coach

- Clayton Bates (Florida)

Assistant coach(es)

- Thomas Kelley (Michigan State)
- Kristof Kendrick (Western Michigan)
- Jacob Bullock (Aquinas (MI))

Legend

- (C) Team captain
- (S) Suspended
- (I) Ineligible
- (W) Walk-on
- Injured
- Current redshirt

Roster
Last update: January 12, 2021

== Schedule and results ==
| Date time, TV | Rank^{#} | Opponent^{#} | Result | Record | Site (attendance) city, state |
Non-conference regular season
| November 25, 2020*; 6:00 pm, FS1 | | at Butler | L 62–66 | 0–1 | Hinkle Fieldhouse (1,500); Indianapolis, IN |
| November 28, 2020* | | at Trine | Canceled due to COVID-19 | | MTI Center; Angola, IN |
| December 2, 2020*; 7:00 pm | | at Notre Dame | Canceled due to COVID-19 | | Purcell Pavilion; Notre Dame, IN |
| December 6, 2020*; 6:00 pm, BTN | | at No. 8 Michigan State | L 61–79 | 0–2 | Breslin Center; East Lansing, MI |
| December 7, 2020*; 7:00 pm, ESPN+ | | Adrian College | W 62–42 | 1–2 | University Arena; Kalamazoo, MI |
| December 12, 2020*; 2:00 pm, ESPN3 | | Detroit Mercy | L 57–67 | 1–3 | University Arena; Kalamazoo, MI |
| December 13, 2020*; 2:00 pm, ESPN3 | | Milwaukee | L 63–71 | 1–4 | University Arena; Kalamazoo, MI |
MAC regular season
| December 18, 2020; 2:00 pm, ESPN3 | | Central Michigan | W 76–61 | 2–4 (1–0) | University Arena; Kalamazoo, MI |
| December 22, 2020; 2:00 pm, ESPN3 | | Ball State | L 68–76 | 2–5 (1–1) | University Arena; Kalamazoo, MI |
| January 2, 2021; 2:00 pm, ESPN3 | | Toledo | L 59–70 | 2–6 (1–2) | University Arena; Kalamazoo, MI |
| January 5, 2021; 7:00 pm | | at Ball State | Postponed due to COVID-19 | | Worthen Arena; Muncie, IN |
| January 9, 2021; 4:00 pm, ESPN3 | | at Kent State | L 54–80 | 2–7 (1–3) | MAC Center; Kent, Ohio |
| January 12, 2021; 2:00 pm, ESPN+ | | Buffalo | L 69–85 | 2–8 (1–4) | University Arena; Kalamazoo, MI |
| January 16, 2021; 2:00 pm, ESPN3 | | Miami (OH) | Postponed | | University Arena; Kalamazoo, MI |
| January 19, 2021; 7:00 pm, ESPN3 | | at Eastern Michigan | Canceled | | Convocation Center; Ypsilanti, MI |
| January 23, 2021; 5:00 pm, ESPN+ | | Akron | L 68–79 | 2–9 (1–5) | University Arena; Kalamazoo, MI |
| January 26, 2021; 6:00 pm, ESPN+ | | at Ohio | L 58–81 | 2–10 (1–6) | Convocation Center; Athens, OH |
| January 30, 2021; 2:00 pm, ESPN3 | | at Miami (OH) | L 56–65 | 2–11 (1–7) | Millett Hall; Oxford, OH |
| February 2, 2021; 7:00 pm, ESPN3 | | Northern Illinois | Canceled | | University Arena; Kalamazoo, MI |
| February 3, 2021; 7:00 pm, ESPN+ | | at Bowling Green | W 76–70 | 3–11 (2–7) | Stroh Center; Bowling Green, OH |
| February 6, 2021; 2:00 pm, ESPN+ | | at Central Michigan | W 67–65 | 4–11 (3–7) | McGuirk Arena; Mount Pleasant, MI |
| February 9, 2021; 2:00 pm, ESPN+ | | at Buffalo | Postponed | | Alumni Arena; Amherst, NY |
| February 12, 2021; 8:00 pm, CBSSN | | at Buffalo | L 54–86 | 4–12 (3–8) | Alumni Arena; Amherst, NY |
| February 13, 2021; 2:00 pm | | Ohio | Canceled | | University Arena; Kalamazoo, MI |
| February 16, 2021; 7:00 pm, ESPN3 | | Kent State | L 69–76 | 4–13 (3–9) | University Arena (100); Kalamazoo, MI |
| February 21, 2021; 7:00 pm | | at Ball State | Canceled | | Worthen Arena; Muncie, IN |
| February 25, 2021; 12:00 pm, ESPN+ | | Miami (OH) | L 66–74 | 4–14 (3–10) | University Arena (100); Kalamazoo, MI |
| February 27, 2021; 5:00 pm, ESPN3 | | at Toledo | L 44–91 | 4–15 (3–11) | Savage Arena; Toledo, OH |
| March 2, 2021; 7:00 pm, ESPN+ | | at Northern Illinois | W 73–63 | 5–15 (4–11) | Convocation Center; DeKalb, IL |
| March 5, 2021; 7:00 pm, ESPN3 | | Eastern Michigan | L 63–64 | 5–16 (4–12) | University Arena; Kalamazoo, MI |
*Non-conference game. ^{#}Rankings from AP Poll. (#) Tournament seedings in parentheses. All times are in Eastern.
