= 2020–21 Akron Zips men's basketball team =

American college basketball season

2020–21 Akron Zips men's basketball
- Conference: Mid-American Conference
- East Division
- Record: 15–8 (12–6 MAC)
- Head coach: John Groce (4th season)
- Associate head coach: Dustin Ford (4th season)
- Assistant coaches: Rob Fulford (4th season); Robby Pridgen (4th season)
- Home arena: James A. Rhodes Arena

2020–21 Mid-American Conference men's basketball standings
| | Conf. | | | | Overall |
| Team | W | | L | PCT | W | | L | PCT |
|---|---|---|---|---|---|---|---|---|
| Toledo | 15 | – | 4 | .789 | 21 | – | 9 | .700 |
| Buffalo | 12 | – | 5 | .706 | 16 | – | 9 | .640 |
| Akron | 12 | – | 6 | .667 | 15 | – | 8 | .652 |
| Kent State | 12 | – | 6 | .667 | 15 | – | 8 | .652 |
| Ohio † | 9 | – | 5 | .643 | 17 | – | 8 | .680 |
| Bowling Green | 10 | – | 8 | .556 | 14 | – | 12 | .538 |
| Miami (OH) | 9 | – | 8 | .529 | 12 | – | 11 | .522 |
| Ball State | 8 | – | 9 | .471 | 10 | – | 13 | .435 |
| Western Michigan | 4 | – | 12 | .250 | 5 | – | 16 | .238 |
| Eastern Michigan | 3 | – | 11 | .214 | 6 | – | 12 | .333 |
| Central Michigan | 3 | – | 13 | .188 | 7 | – | 16 | .304 |
| Northern Illinois | 2 | – | 12 | .143 | 3 | – | 16 | .158 |
† 2021 MAC tournament winner

The 2020–21 Akron Zips men's basketball team represented the University of Akron during the 2020–21 NCAA Division I men's basketball season. The Zips, led by fourth-year head coach John Groce, played their home games at the James A. Rhodes Arena in Akron, Ohio as members of the East Division of the Mid-American Conference. In a season limited due to the ongoing COVID-19 pandemic, the Zips finished the season 15–8, 12–6 in MAC play to finish in a tie for third place. They defeated Bowling Green in the quarterfinals of the MAC tournament before losing to Buffalo in the semifinals.

== Previous season ==
The Zips finished the 2019–20 season 24–7, 14–4 in MAC play to win the East Division. They were to play Ohio in the conference tournament before the season ended due to the COVID-19 pandemic.

== Offseason ==
=== Departures ===
| Name | Number | Pos. | Height | Weight | Year | Hometown | Reason for departure |
|---|---|---|---|---|---|---|---|
| Tyler Cheese | 4 | G | 6'5" | 195 | Senior | Albany, GA | Graduated |
| Deng Riak | 10 | C | 6'10" | 225 | Senior | Melbourne, Australia | Graduated |
| Channel Banks | 11 | G | 6'4" | 186 | Senior | Las Vegas, NV | Graduated |
| Marquelle McIntyre | 12 | G | 5'10" | 175 | Senior | Greensboro, NC | Walk-on; graduated |
| Xeyrius Williams | 20 | F | 6'9" | 205 | Senior | Huber Heights, OH | Graduated |
| Jaden Sayles | 23 | F | 6'9" | 235 | Junior | Cincinnati, OH | Transferred to Stony Brook |

=== Incoming transfers ===
| Name | Number | Pos. | Height | Weight | Year | Hometown | Previous School |
|---|---|---|---|---|---|---|---|
| Jermaine Marshall | 4 | F | 6'6" | 220 | Sophomore | Birmingham, AL | Transferred from Florida SouthWestern State. Will have one year of remaining eligibility. |
| Michael Wynn | 13 | F | 6'6" | 210 | Junior | Albany, NY | Transferred from Wake Forest. Under NCAA transfer rules, Wynn will have to sit out for the 2020–21 season. Will have two years of remaining eligibility. |
| Taylor Currie | 33 | F | 6'8" | 225 | Sophomore | Clarkston, MI | Transferred from Wisconsin. Will have three years of remaining eligibility. |

=== 2020 recruiting class ===
College recruiting information
| Name | Hometown | School | Height | Weight | Commit date |
|---|---|---|---|---|---|
| Garvin Clarke #38 CG | Euclid, OH | Euclid | 6 ft 0 in (1.83 m) | 175 lb (79 kg) | Oct 15, 2019 |
| Garvin Clarke #38 CG | Recruit ratings: Scout: Rivals: 247Sports: ESPN: | | | | |
Overall recruit ranking:
Note: In many cases, Scout, Rivals, 247Sports, On3, and ESPN may conflict in their listings of height and weight.; In these cases, the average was taken. ESPN grades are on a 100-point scale.; Sources: "2020 Team Ranking". Rivals.

=== 2021 recruiting class ===
College recruiting information
| Name | Hometown | School | Height | Weight | Commit date |
|---|---|---|---|---|---|
| Nate Johnson #55 SG | Middletown, OH | Lakota East | 6 ft 3 in (1.91 m) | 185 lb (84 kg) | Nov 9, 2020 |
| Nate Johnson #55 SG | Recruit ratings: Scout: Rivals: 247Sports: ESPN: | | | | |
| Sekou Sada Kalle; PF | Louisville, KY | Aspire Basketball Academy | 6 ft 10 in (2.08 m) | 180 lb (82 kg) | Nov 8, 2020 |
| Sekou Sada Kalle; PF | Recruit ratings: Scout: Rivals: 247Sports: ESPN: | | | | |
Overall recruit ranking:
Note: In many cases, Scout, Rivals, 247Sports, On3, and ESPN may conflict in their listings of height and weight.; In these cases, the average was taken. ESPN grades are on a 100-point scale.; Sources: "2021 Team Ranking". Rivals.

== Roster ==
2020–21 Akron Zips men's basketball team
Players
Coaches

| Pos. | # | Name | Height | Weight | Year | Previous school | Hometown |
|---|---|---|---|---|---|---|---|
| G | 0 | Tre Edwards | 6 ft 6 in (1.98 m) | 188 lb (85 kg) | RS Fr | Hamilton Heights Christian Academy/Link Year Prep | Hamilton, ON |
| G | 1 | Loren Cristian Jackson | 5 ft 8 in (1.73 m) | 160 lb (73 kg) | RS Sr | Victory Rock Prep; Long Beach State | Chicago, IL |
| G | 2 | Greg Tribble Jr. | 6 ft 1 in (1.85 m) | 192 lb (87 kg) | So | Huntington Prep | Cincinnati, OH |
| F | 3 | Maishe Dailey | 6 ft 7 in (2.01 m) | 195 lb (88 kg) | RS Sr | Beachwood; Iowa | Beachwood, OH |
| F | 4 | Jermaine Marshall | 6 ft 6 in (1.98 m) | 220 lb (100 kg) | So | Hueytown; Florida SouthWestern State | Birmingham, AL |
| F | 5 | Camron Reece | 6 ft 7 in (2.01 m) | 228 lb (103 kg) | Sr | Oakland Tech; Sheridan College | Oakland, CA |
| G | 11 | Garvin Clarke | 6 ft 0 in (1.83 m) | 180 lb (82 kg) | Fr | Euclid | Euclid, OH |
| G | 12 | Bryan Trimble Jr. | 6 ft 2 in (1.88 m) | 216 lb (98 kg) | RS Jr | Sunrise Christian Academy; St. John’s | Beachwood, OH |
| F | 13 | Michael Wynn | 6 ft 6 in (1.98 m) | 210 lb (95 kg) | Jr | Liberty Heights; Iowa | Albany, NY |
| G | 14 | Scott Walter (W) | 5 ft 10 in (1.78 m) | 170 lb (77 kg) | RS So | St. Vincent-St. Mary | Akron, OH |
| C | 21 | Aziz Bandaogo | 7 ft 0 in (2.13 m) | 225 lb (102 kg) | Fr | NBA Academy Africa | Louisville, KY |
| F | 22 | Mikal Dawson | 6 ft 5 in (1.96 m) | 220 lb (100 kg) | So | Huntington | Huntington, WV |
| F | 24 | Ali Ali | 6 ft 8 in (2.03 m) | 206 lb (93 kg) | So | East Noble High School | Kendallville, IN |
| F | 25 | Enrique Freeman | 6 ft 7 in (2.01 m) | 205 lb (93 kg) | RS Fr | St. Martin De Porres High School | Cleveland, OH |
| G | 25 | LePear Toles | 6 ft 6 in (1.98 m) | 195 lb (88 kg) | RS Jr | Canton McKinley; State Fair CC | Canton, OH |
| F | 33 | Taylor Currie | 6 ft 8 in (2.03 m) | 225 lb (102 kg) | RS So | Clarkston; Wisconsin | Clarkston, MI |

Head coach

- John Groce (Taylor)

Assistant coach(es)

- Dustin Ford (Ohio)
- Rob Fulford (Marshall)
- Robby Pridgen (Roanoke)

Legend

- (C) Team captain
- (S) Suspended
- (I) Ineligible
- (W) Walk-on
- Injured
- Current redshirt

Roster

== Schedule and results ==
Akron had to cancel its games against Middle Tennessee and Miami (OH) due to COVID-19. They have postponed games against Eastern Michigan and Ohio.

| Date time, TV | Rank^{#} | Opponent^{#} | Result | Record | High points | High rebounds | High assists | Site (attendance) city, state |
Non-conference regular season
| November 25, 2020* | | Middle Tennessee | Canceled | | | | | James A. Rhodes Arena; Akron, OH |
| December 5, 2020* | | Marshall | Canceled | | | | | James A. Rhodes Arena; Akron, OH |
| December 12, 2020; 2:00 pm | | Cedarville | W 97–49 | 1–0 | 19 – Jackson | 8 – Reece | 9 – Jackson | James A. Rhodes Arena (0); Akron, OH |
| December 15, 2020; 1:00 pm, ESPN3 | | vs. St. Bonaventure | L 74–81 | 1–1 | 22 – Jackson | 9 – Marshall | 7 – Jackson | Rocket Mortgage FieldHouse (150); Cleveland, OH |
| December 19, 2020; 2:00 pm | | Malone | W 93–83 | 2–1 | 34 – Jackson | 21 – Freeman | 10 – Jackson | James A. Rhodes Arena (0); Akron, OH |
MAC regular season
| December 22, 2020; 2:00 pm, ESPN+ | | Ohio | W 90–70 | 3–1 (1–0) | 22 – Trimble Jr. | 8 – Tied | 8 – Jackson | James A. Rhodes Arena (0); Akron, OH |
| January 1, 2021; 7:00 pm | | Kent State | W 66–62 | 4–1 (2–0) | 31 – Jackson | 9 – Freeman | 6 – Jackson | James A. Rhodes Arena (25); Akron, OH |
| January 5, 2021 | | at Eastern Michigan | Postponed | | | | | Convocation Center; Ypsilanti, MI |
| January 9, 2021; 12:00 pm, ESPN+ | | at Eastern Michigan | L 59–71 | 4–2 (2–1) | 10 – Tied | 5 – Wynn | 3 – Ali | Convocation Center (0); Ypsilanti, MI |
| January 12, 2021; 3:00 pm, ESPN+ | | at Northern Illinois | L 65–67 | 4–3 (2–2) | 15 – Ali | 11 – Freeman | 7 – Jackson | Convocation Center (0); DeKalb, IL |
| January 16, 2021; 2:00 pm, ESPN+ | | Toledo | W 95–94 ^{OT} | 5–3 (3–2) | 34 – Jackson | 6 – Ali | 7 – Jackson | James A. Rhodes Arena (0); Akron, OH |
| January 19, 2021; 7:00 pm, ESPN+ | | at Bowling Green | W 69–57 | 6–3 (4–2) | 18 – Trimble Jr. | 14 – Freeman | 6 – Jackson | Stroh Center (0); Bowling Green, OH |
| January 21, 2021; 6:00 pm, ESPN+ | | Central Michigan | W 81–67 | 7–3 (5–2) | 25 – Trimble Jr. | 12 – Freeman | 10 – Jackson | James A. Rhodes Arena (0); Akron, OH |
| January 23, 2021; 5:00 pm, ESPN+ | | at Western Michigan | W 79–68 | 8–3 (6–2) | 32 – Jackson | 10 – Freeman | 6 – Jackson | University Arena (0); Kalamazoo, MI |
| January 26, 2021; 7:30 pm, ESPN3 | | Eastern Michigan | W 86–65 | 9–3 (7–2) | 14 – Dailey | 10 – Reece | 5 – Ali | James A. Rhodes Arena (0); Akron, OH |
| January 30, 2021; 2:00 pm, ESPN3 | | Ball State | W 74–42 | 10–3 (8–2) | 16 – Jackson | 8 – Freeman | 6 – Jackson | James A. Rhodes Arena (0); Akron, OH |
| February 2, 2021; 7:00 pm, ESPN+ | | at Toledo | L 76–91 | 10–4 (8–3) | 32 – Jackson | 11 – Freeman | 4 – Jackson | Savage Arena (0); Toledo, OH |
| February 5, 2021; 7:00 pm, ESPNU | | Kent State | W 72–61 | 11–4 (9–3) | 26 – Trimble Jr. | 11 – Freeman | 8 – Jackson | James A. Rhodes Arena (0); Akron, OH |
| February 9, 2021 | | at Ohio | Postponed | | | | | Convocation Center; Athens, OH |
| February 12, 2021; 7:00 pm, ESPNU | | at Miami (OH) | W 83–76 | 12–4 (10–3) | 25 – Jackson | 7 – Freeman | 8 – Dailey | Millett Hall (0); Oxford, OH |
| February 16, 2021; 2:00 pm, ESPN3 | | Northern Illinois | W 81–76 | 13–4 (11–3) | 22 – Trimble Jr. | 8 – Freeman | 7 – Jackson | James A. Rhodes Arena (0); Akron, OH |
| February 19, 2021; 1:00 pm, ESPN3 | | at Ball State | W 88–79 | 14–4 (12–3) | – | – | – | Worthen Arena (0); Muncie, IN |
| February 27, 2021; 2:00 pm, ESPN3 | | Bowling Green | L 71–83 | 14–6 (12–5) | 29 – Jackson | 9 – Freeman | 4 – Jackson | James A. Rhodes Arena (0); Akron, OH |
| March 2, 2021; 2:00 pm, ESPN3 | | at Buffalo | L 78–80 | 14–7 (12–6) | 27 – Jackson | 12 – Freeman | 4 – Jackson | Alumni Arena (0); Amherst, NY |
| March 5, 2021 | | Miami (OH) | Canceled | | | | | James A. Rhodes Arena; Akron, OH |
MAC tournament
| March 11, 2021; 7:00 pm, ESPN+ | (3) | vs. (6) Bowling Green; Quarterfinals | W 74–67 | 15–7 | 31 – Jackson | 9 – Freeman | 4 – Jackson | Rocket Mortgage FieldHouse (0); Cleveland, OH |
| March 12, 2021; 7:30 pm, CBSSN | (3) | vs. (2) Buffalo; Semifinals | L 74–81 ^{OT} | 15–8 | 27 – Jackson | 14 – Freeman | 5 – Jackson | Rocket Mortgage FieldHouse (0); Cleveland, OH |
*Non-conference game. ^{#}Rankings from AP Poll. (#) Tournament seedings in parentheses. All times are in Eastern Time.

== Rankings ==
Ranking movements
| | Week | | | | | | | | | | | | | | | | | | | | |
| Poll | Pre | 1 | 2 | 3 | 4 | 5 | 6 | 7 | 8 | 9 | 10 | 11 | 12 | 13 | 14 | 15 | 16 | 17 | 18 | 19 | Final |
|---|---|---|---|---|---|---|---|---|---|---|---|---|---|---|---|---|---|---|---|---|---|
| AP | | | | | | | | | | | | | | | | | | | | | Not released |
| Coaches | | | | | | | | | | | | | | | | | | | | | |

*AP does not release post-NCAA Tournament rankings
