= 2020–21 Bowling Green Falcons men's basketball team =

American college basketball season

2020–21 Bowling Green Falcons men's basketball

CBI, Quarterfinals
- Conference: Mid-American Conference
- East Division
- Record: 14–12 (10–8 MAC)
- Head coach: Michael Huger (6th season)
- Assistant coaches: Kevin Noon (5th season); Brandon Watkins (1st season); Steven Wright (1st season)
- Home arena: Stroh Center

2020–21 Mid-American Conference men's basketball standings
	Conf.				Overall
Team	W		L	PCT	W		L	PCT
Toledo	15	–	4	.789	21	–	9	.700
Buffalo	12	–	5	.706	16	–	9	.640
Akron	12	–	6	.667	15	–	8	.652
Kent State	12	–	6	.667	15	–	8	.652
Ohio †	9	–	5	.643	17	–	8	.680
Bowling Green	10	–	8	.556	14	–	12	.538
Miami (OH)	9	–	8	.529	12	–	11	.522
Ball State	8	–	9	.471	10	–	13	.435
Western Michigan	4	–	12	.250	5	–	16	.238
Eastern Michigan	3	–	11	.214	6	–	12	.333
Central Michigan	3	–	13	.188	7	–	16	.304
Northern Illinois	2	–	12	.143	3	–	16	.158
† 2021 MAC tournament winner

The 2020–21 Bowling Green Falcons men's basketball team represented Bowling Green State University in the 2020–21 NCAA Division I men's basketball season. The Falcons, led by 6th-year head coach Michael Huger, played their home games at the Stroh Center in Bowling Green, Ohio as members of the East Division of the Mid-American Conference. They finished the season 14-12, 10-8 to finish in 6th place. They lost in the quarterfinals of the MAC tournament to Akron. They received an invitation to the CBI where they lost in the quarterfinals to Stetson.

== Previous season ==
The Falcons finished the 2019–20 season 21–10 overall, 12–6 in MAC play to finish second place in the East Division. They were scheduled to play Toledo in the MAC tournament before it was cancelled due to the COVID-19 pandemic.

== Offseason ==
=== Departures ===
Name	Number	Pos.	Height	Weight	Year	Hometown	Reason for departure
Michael Laster	0	G	6'1"	175	Senior	Manhattan, NY	Graduated
Tayler Mattos	2	C	6'11"	250	Sophomore	New London, NH	Transferred to New Hampshire
Dylan Frye	5	G	6'2"	185	Senior	Miami, FL	Graduated
Ethan Good	15	G	6'1"	180	Senior	Wapakoneta, OH	Graduated
Marlon Sierra	22	F	6'7"	225	Senior	Miami, FL	Graduated
Joniya Gadson	52	C	6'10"	245	Junior	Miami Gardens, FL	Transferred

=== 2020 recruiting class ===
College recruiting information
Name	Hometown	School	Height	Weight	Commit date
Josiah Fulcher #43 CG	Pickerington, OH	Pickerington Central	6 ft 2 in (1.88 m)	165 lb (75 kg)	Sep 29, 2019
Josiah Fulcher #43 CG	Recruit ratings: Scout: Rivals: 247Sports: ESPN:				
Overall recruit ranking:
Note: In many cases, Scout, Rivals, 247Sports, On3, and ESPN may conflict in their listings of height and weight.; In these cases, the average was taken. ESPN grades are on a 100-point scale.; Sources: "2020 Team Ranking". Rivals.

== Roster ==
2020–21 Bowling Green Falcons men's basketball team
Players
Coaches

Pos.	#	Name	Height	Weight	Year	Hometown
F	0	Jacob Washington	6 ft 8 in (2.03 m)	220 lb (100 kg)	Jr	Los Angeles, California
G	1	Justin Turner	6 ft 4 in (1.93 m)	205 lb (93 kg)	RS Sr	Detroit, Michigan
G	2	Josiah Fulcher	6 ft 3 in (1.91 m)	180 lb (82 kg)	Fr	Lima, Ohio
G	3	Caleb Fields	6 ft 1 in (1.85 m)	185 lb (84 kg)	Jr	Cape May Court House, New Jersey
G	4	Davin Zeigler	6 ft 3 in (1.91 m)	175 lb (79 kg)	So	Cleveland, Ohio
G	5	Kaden Metheny	5 ft 11 in (1.8 m)	180 lb (82 kg)	Fr	Morgantown, West Virginia
F	10	Cam Young	6 ft 7 in (2.01 m)	200 lb (91 kg)	Fr	Swedesboro, New Jersey
G/F	11	Trey Diggs	6 ft 6 in (1.98 m)	210 lb (95 kg)	Sr	Niceville, Florida
G	12	Isaac Elsasser (W)	6 ft 4 in (1.93 m)	185 lb (84 kg)	So	Bowling Green, Ohio
G/F	13	Chandler Turner	6 ft 7 in (2.01 m)	195 lb (88 kg)	So	Detroit, Michigan
F	21	Matiss Kulackovskis	6 ft 9 in (2.06 m)	215 lb (98 kg)	RS Jr	Saldus, Latvia
G/F	25	Daeqwon Plowden	6 ft 6 in (1.98 m)	215 lb (98 kg)	Sr	Philadelphia, Pennsylvania
G	33	Jackson Watson (W)	6 ft 1 in (1.85 m)	180 lb (82 kg)	Fr	Libertyville, Illinois
C	35	Dylan Swingle	6 ft 10 in (2.08 m)	295 lb (134 kg)	RS So	Chillicothe, Ohio

Head coach

- Michael Huger (Bowling Green)

Assistant coach(es)

- Kevin Noon (Rider/Bowling Green)
- Brandon Watkins (Penn State)
- Steve Wright (Bowling Green)

Legend

- (C) Team captain
- (S) Suspended
- (I) Ineligible
- (W) Walk-on
- Injured
- Current redshirt

Roster
Last update: November 23, 2020

== Schedule and results ==
Bowling Green had to cancel their games against Western Carolina and Defiance. They have postponed games against Central Michigan, Northern Illinois, and Eastern Michigan.

Date time, TV	Rank^{#}	Opponent^{#}	Result	Record	High points	High rebounds	High assists	Site (attendance) city, state
Regular season
November 25, 2020*; 4:00 p.m., ESPN2		at No. 25 Michigan	L 82–96	0–1	24 – J. Turner	7 – Plowden	3 – Tied	Crisler Center (0); Ann Arbor, MI
November 28, 2020*; 12:00 p.m., ESPN3		South Carolina State	W 101–78	1–1	19 – Plowden	16 – Plowden	6 – J. Turner	Stroh Center (300); Bowling Green, OH
November 30, 2020*; 6:00 p.m., ESPN+		at Appalachian State	W 78–76 ^{OT}	2–1	25 – J. Turner	8 – Plowden	3 – Tied	Holmes Center (0); Boone, NC
December 3, 2020*; Cancelled		at Western Carolina	Canceled					Ramsey Center; Cullowhee, NC
December 3, 2020*; 7:00 p.m., ESPN3		Purdue Northwest	W 88–67	3–1	19 – J. Turner	7 – Diggs	5 – J. Turner	Stroh Center (300); Bowling Green, OH
December 6, 2020; 6:00 p.m.		Buffalo	W 86–78	4–1 (1–0)	33 – J. Turner	10 – Plowmen	3 – Tied	Stroh Center (300); Bowling Green, OH
December 13, 2020*; 12:00 p.m., ESPN+		Wright State	L 67-85	4–2	15 – Metheny	5 – Plowden	6 – J. Turner	Stroh Center (300); Bowling Green, OH
December 18, 2020*; 6:00 p.m., ESPN3		at Robert Morris	W 85–65	5–2	24 – J. Turner	13 – Plowden	11 – J. Turner	UPMC Events Center (0); Moon Township, PA
December 20, 2020; Canceled		Defiance	Canceled					Stroh Center; Bowling Green, OH
December 30, 2020; 2:00 p.m.		at Ohio	W 83–75	6–2 (2–0)	20 – Diggs	8 – Metheny	6 – J. Turner	Convocation Center (0); Athens, OH
January 2, 2021; 6:00 p.m., ESPN3		at Northern Illinois	W 68–42	7–2 (3–0)	20 – J. Turner	9 – Plowden	3 – Tied	Convocation Center (0); DeKalb, IL
January 5, 2021; 6:00 p.m., ESPN+		Central Michigan	W 90–69	8–2 (4–0)	17 – J. Turner	7 – Metheny	7 – J. Turner	Stroh Center (300); Bowling Green, OH
January 9, 2021; 4:30 p.m., ESPN+		at Central Michigan	W 93–65	9–2 ( 5–0)	24 – J. Turner	14 – Plowden	8 – J. Turner	McGuirk Arena (0); Mount Pleasant, MI
January 12, 2021; 7:00 p.m., ESPN+		Ball State	L 64–88	9–3 (5–1)	18 – J. Turner	8 – Plowden	5 – J. Turner	Stroh Center (0); Bowling Green, OH
January 15, 2021; 7:00 p.m., CBSSN		at Buffalo	W 76–69	10–3 (6–1)	25 – Turner	8 – Tied	5 – J. Turner	Alumni Arena (0); Amherst, NY
January 19, 2021; 7:00 p.m., ESPN+		Akron	L 57–69	10–4 (6–2)	14 – Tied	8 – Plowden	6 – J. Turner	Stroh Center (0); Bowling Green, OH
January 21, 2021; 5:30 p.m., ESPN3		Miami (OH)	L 77–96	10–5 (6–3)	21 – Plowden	11 – Diggs	3 – J. Turner	Millett Hall (0); Oxford, OH
January 23, 2021; Postponed		at Central Michigan	Postponed					McGuirk Arena; Mount Pleasant, MI
January 26, 2021; Postponed		Northern Illinois	Postponed					Stroh Center; Bowling Green, OH
January 27, 2021; 5:00 p.m., ESPN+		at Kent State	L 91–96	10–6 (6–4)	23 – Fulcher	8 – J. Turner	4 – J. Turner	MAC Center (0); Kent, OH
January 30, 2021; 5:00 p.m., ESPN+		Toledo	L 66–84	10–7 (6–5)	17 – Diggs	9 – Fulcher	5 – J. Turner	Stroh Center (300); Bowling Green, OH
February 2, 2021; Postponed		at Eastern Michigan	Postponed					Convocation Center; Ypsilanti, MI
February 6, 2021; 7:00 p.m., ESPN+		Western Michigan	L 70–76	10–8 (6–6)	25 – J. Turner	6 – Tied	5 – Fields	Stroh Center (300); Bowling Green, OH
February 9, 2021; 7:00 p.m., CBSSN		Kent State	L 67–71	10–8 (6–7)	18 – Tied	8 – Plowden	5 – J. Turner	Stroh Center (300); Bowling Green, OH
February 13, 2021; 2:00 p.m., ESPN3		at Toledo	W 88–81	11–9 (7–7)	22 – Plowden	9 – Plowden	4 – Tied	Savage Arena (0); Toledo, OH
February 16, 2021; 7:00 p.m., ESPN3		Ball State	W 75–62	12–9 (8–7)	27 – J. Turner	10 – Fields	3 – Tied	Worthen Arena (0); Muncie, IN
February 20, 2021; 6:00 p.m.		Ohio	Canceled					Stroh Center; Bowling Green, OH
February 23, 2021; 7:00 p.m.		at Eastern Michigan	W 82–69	13–9 (9–7)	29 – Metheny	10 – Fields	7 – Fields	Convocation Center (125); Ypsilanti, MI
February 26, 2021; 7:00 p.m.		at Akron	W 83–71	14–9 (10–7)	19 – J. Turner	6 – Tied	5 – Metheny	Rhodes Arena (75); Akron, OH
March 2, 2021; 7:00 p.m., ESPN+		Miami (OH)	L 79–84 ^{OT}	14–10 (10–8)	19 – Tied	18 – Plowden	3 – J. Turner	Stroh Center (300); Bowling Green, OH
March 5, 2021; Canceled		at Ohio	Canceled					Convocation Center; Athens, OH
MAC tournament
March 11, 2021; 7:00 P.M., ESPN+	(6)	vs. (3) Akron; Quarterfinals	L 67–74	14–11	26 – Plowden	8 – C. Turner	2 – J. Turner	Rocket Mortgage FieldHouse (0); Cleveland, OH
CBI
March 22, 2021; 11:30 A.M., FloSports		vs. Stetson; Quarterfinals	L 52–53	14–12	–	–	–	Ocean Center; Daytona Beach, FL
*Non-conference game. ^{#}Rankings from AP Poll. (#) Tournament seedings in parentheses. All times are in Eastern Time.
