= 2020–21 Buffalo Bulls men's basketball team =

American college basketball season

2020–21 Buffalo Bulls men's basketball

NIT, First Round
- Conference: Mid-American Conference
- Record: 16–9 (12–5 MAC)
- Head coach: Jim Whitesell (2nd season)
- Assistant coaches: Jamie Quarles (4th season); Angres Thorpe (2nd season); Brendan Foley (1st season)
- Home arena: Alumni Arena

2020–21 Mid-American Conference men's basketball standings
	Conf.				Overall
Team	W		L	PCT	W		L	PCT
Toledo	15	–	4	.789	21	–	9	.700
Buffalo	12	–	5	.706	16	–	9	.640
Akron	12	–	6	.667	15	–	8	.652
Kent State	12	–	6	.667	15	–	8	.652
Ohio †	9	–	5	.643	17	–	8	.680
Bowling Green	10	–	8	.556	14	–	12	.538
Miami (OH)	9	–	8	.529	12	–	11	.522
Ball State	8	–	9	.471	10	–	13	.435
Western Michigan	4	–	12	.250	5	–	16	.238
Eastern Michigan	3	–	11	.214	6	–	12	.333
Central Michigan	3	–	13	.188	7	–	16	.304
Northern Illinois	2	–	12	.143	3	–	16	.158
† 2021 MAC tournament winner

The 2020–21 Buffalo Bulls men's basketball team represented the University at Buffalo in the 2020–21 NCAA Division I men's basketball season. The Bulls, led by second-year head coach Jim Whitesell, played their home games at Alumni Arena in Amherst, New York as members of the Mid-American Conference. Starting this season, the MAC announced the removal of divisions. They finished the season 16–9, 12–5 in MAC play to finish in second place. They defeated Miami (OH) and Akron to advance to the championship game of the MAC tournament where they lost to Ohio. They were invited to the National Invitation Tournament where they lost in the first round to Colorado State.

== Previous season ==
The Bulls finished the 2019–20 season 20–12, 11–7 in MAC play to finish in third place in the MAC East division. They were upset in the first round of the MAC tournament by Miami (OH).

== Roster ==
2020–21 Buffalo Bulls men's basketball team
Players
Coaches

Pos.	#	Name	Height	Weight	Year	Previous school	Hometown
G/F	0	David Nickelberry	6 ft 7 in (2.01 m)	200 lb (91 kg)	Sr	Trinity Valley Community College	Orlando, Florida
F	1	LaQuill Hardnett	6 ft 8 in (2.03 m)	200 lb (91 kg)	So	Cincinnati	Philadelphia, Pennsylvania
G	2	Keishawn Brewton	6 ft 2 in (1.88 m)	178 lb (81 kg)	Sr	Coastal Carolina	Spartanburg, South Carolina
G	3	Jayvon Graves	6 ft 3 in (1.91 m)	200 lb (91 kg)	Sr	St. Vincent–St. Mary High School	Malvern, Ohio
G	4	Malik Zachery	6 ft 2 in (1.88 m)	175 lb (79 kg)	So	Chipola College	Syracuse, New York
G	5	Savion Gallion	6 ft 5 in (1.96 m)	185 lb (84 kg)	So	Mt. Zion Prep	Washington, D.C.
G	10	Ronaldo Segu	6 ft 0 in (1.83 m)	160 lb (73 kg)	Jr	Orlando Christian Prep	Orlando, Florida
F	11	Jeenathan Williams	6 ft 5 in (1.96 m)	206 lb (93 kg)	Jr	Prolific Prep	Rochester, New York
F	21	Dominic Johnson	6 ft 5 in (1.96 m)	220 lb (100 kg)	Sr	Catholic Central High School	Windsor, Ontario
F	22	Lucas Saleh	6 ft 6 in (1.98 m)	206 lb (93 kg)	So	Feather River College	Tiburon, California
G	23	Jamon Bivens	6 ft 3 in (1.91 m)	188 lb (85 kg)	Sr	Fayette County High School	Atlanta, Georgia
F	24	Tra'Von Fagan	6 ft 8 in (2.03 m)	208 lb (94 kg)	RS Jr	Florida SouthWestern State	Waterloo, Iowa
G	33	Maceo Jack	6 ft 5 in (1.96 m)	190 lb (86 kg)	Sr	George Washington	Williamsville, New York
F	34	Josh Mballa	6 ft 7 in (2.01 m)	220 lb (100 kg)	Jr	Texas Tech	Bordeaux, France
C	41	Brock Bertram	6 ft 11 in (2.11 m)	242 lb (110 kg)	Sr	Apple Valley High School	Apple Valley, Minnesota
C	42	David Skogman	6 ft 10 in (2.08 m)	223 lb (101 kg)	RS Fr	Waukesha West High School	Waukesha, Wisconsin

Head coach

- Jim Whitesell (Luther)

Assistant coach(es)

- Jamie Quarles (Augusta)
- Angres Thorpe (St. Leo)
- Brendan Foley (Kansas State)

Legend

- (C) Team captain
- (S) Suspended
- (I) Ineligible
- (W) Walk-on
- Injured
- Current redshirt

Roster
Last update: January 28, 2021

== Schedule and results ==
Date time, TV	Rank^{#}	Opponent^{#}	Result	Record	High points	High rebounds	High assists	Site (attendance) city, state
Regular season
November 25, 2020*; 4:00 pm		Gannon	Canceled					Alumni Arena; Amherst, NY
November 27, 2020*; 4:30 pm		vs. Towson; Bubbleville	W 74–65	1–0	28 – Williams	12 – 2 Tied	5 – 2 Tied	Mohegan Sun Arena; Uncasville, CT
November 28, 2020*; 3:00 pm		vs. Army; Bubbleville	L 74–78	1–1	18 – Segu	7 – Williams	5 – Williams	Mohegan Sun Arena; Uncasville, CT
December 6, 2020; 6:00 pm, ESPN3		at Bowling Green	L 78–86	1–2 (0–1)	23 – Graves	8 – Fagan	1 – 5 Tied	Stroh Center (300); Bowling Green, OH
December 10, 2020*; 4:00 pm, ESPN3		Mercyhurst	W 81–64	2–2	17 – Williams	12 – Williams	9 – Graves	Alumni Arena; Amherst, NY
December 15, 2020; 5:30 pm, ESPN+		at Miami (OH)	W 90–62	3–2 (1–1)	21 – Williams	7 – Graves	4 – Williams	Millett Hall; Oxford, OH
December 19, 2020*; 6:00 pm, ACCN		at Syracuse	L 96–107 ^{OT}	3–3	27 – Mballa	8 – Graves	7 – Graves	Carrier Dome; Syracuse, NY
December 22, 2020*; 4:00 pm		at St. Bonaventure	Canceled					Reilly Center; St. Bonaventure, NY
December 29, 2020*; 2:00 pm, Big 12 Now		at No. 9 West Virginia	Canceled					WVU Coliseum; Morgantown, WV
January 1, 2021; 7:00 pm, CBSSN		at Akron	Postponed					James A. Rhodes Arena; Akron, OH
January 9, 2021; 5:00 pm, ESPN3		Ball State	W 86–69	4–3 (2–1)	19 – Mballa	19 – Mballa	6 – Mballa	Alumni Arena; Amherst, NY
January 12, 2021; 2:00 pm, ESPN+		at Western Michigan	W 85–69	5–3 (3–1)	25 – Williams	14 – Williams	4 – Brewton	University Arena; Kalamazoo, MI
January 15, 2021; 7:00 pm, CBSSN		Bowling Green	L 69–76	5–4 (3–2)	17 – 2 Tied	15 – Mballa	4 – Segu	Alumni Arena; Amherst, NY
January 19, 2021; 5:00 pm, ESPN+		at Kent State	L 81–84	5–5 (3–3)	22 – Mballa	8 – 2 Tied	6 – Graves	MAC Center; Kent, Ohio
January 21, 2021; 2:00 pm, ESPN+		Eastern Michigan	W 92–77	6–5 (4–3)	24 – Williams	7 – Mballa	5 – 2 Tied	Alumni Arena; Amherst, NY
January 23, 2021; 6:00 pm, ESPN3		at Northern Illinois	Postponed					Convocation Center; DeKalb, IL
January 26, 2021; 5:00 pm		Central Michigan	Postponed					Alumni Arena; Amherst, NY
January 29, 2021; 7:00 pm, ESPNU		Ohio	L 75–76	6–6 (4–4)	18 – Graves	12 – Mballa	4 – 2 Tied	Alumni Arena; Amherst, NY
February 2, 2021; 6:00 pm, ESPN+		at Ball State	W 78–58	7–6 (5–4)	22 – Mballa	16 – Mballa	4 – 2 Tied	Worthen Arena (235); Muncie, IN
February 6, 2021; 2:00 pm, ESPN3		Miami (OH)	W 88–64	8–6 (6–4)	16 – 2 Tied	11 – Skogman	9 – Segu	Alumni Arena; Amherst, NY
February 12, 2021; 8:00 pm, ESPN3		at Central Michigan	Postponed					McGuirk Arena; Mount Pleasant, MI
February 12, 2021; 8:00 pm, CBSSN		Western Michigan	W 86–54	9–6 (7–4)	16 – Graves	12 – Mballa	5 – Segu	Alumni Arena; Amherst, NY
February 16, 2021; 5:00 pm, ESPN3		at Eastern Michigan	Postponed					Convocation Center; Ypsilanti, MI
February 19, 2021; 9:00 pm, ESPN2		Toledo	L 70–80	9–7 (7–5)	19 – Williams	13 – Mballa	5 – Segu	Alumni Arena; Amherst, NY
February 23, 2021; 5:00 pm, ESPN3		at Northern Illinois	W 102–74	10–7 (8–5)	21 – Mballa	12 – Mballa	4 – 2 Tied	Convocation Center (26); DeKalb, IL
February 25, 2021; 2:00 pm, ESPN+		Central Michigan	W 85–73	11–7 (9–5)	20 – Hardnett	10 – Hardnett	11 – Segu	Alumni Arena; Amherst, NY
February 27, 2021; 2:00 pm, ESPN+		at Ohio	W 86–66	12–7 (10–5)	23 – Mballa	9 – Mballa	7 – Graves	Convocation Center; Athens, OH
March 2, 2021; 2:00 pm		Akron	W 80–78	13–7 (11–5)	15 – Mballa	10 – Graves	11 – Graves	Alumni Arena; Amherst, NY
March 5, 2021; 6:00 pm, ESPNU		Kent State	W 81–67	14–7 (12–5)	21 – Williams	9 – Graves	7 – Graves	Alumni Arena; Amherst, NY
MAC Tournament
March 11, 2021; 4:00 pm, ESPN+	(2)	vs. (7) Miami (OH); Quarterfinals	W 74–63	15–7	23 – Mballa	19 – Mballa	6 – Segu	Rocket Mortgage FieldHouse; Cleveland, OH
March 12, 2021; 7:30 pm, CBSSN	(2)	vs. (3) Akron; Semifinals	W 81–74 ^{OT}	16–7	26 – Williams	20 – Mballa	4 – Tied	Rocket Mortgage FieldHouse; Cleveland, OH
March 13, 2021; 7:30 pm, ESPN2	(2)	vs. (5) Ohio; Championship	L 69–84	16–8	24 – Segu	11 – Mballa	3 – Graves	Rocket Mortgage FieldHouse; Cleveland, OH
NIT
March 19, 2021; 7:00 pm, ESPN2	(4)	vs. (1) Colorado State; First Round – Colorado State bracket	L 73–75	16–9	21 – Williams	9 – Mballa	4 – Williams	The Super Pit; Denton, TX
*Non-conference game. ^{#}Rankings from AP Poll. (#) Tournament seedings in parentheses. All times are in Eastern.
