= 2020–21 Kent State Golden Flashes men's basketball team =

American college basketball season

2020–21 Kent State Golden Flashes men's basketball
- Conference: Mid-American Conference
- East Division
- Record: 15–8 (12–6 MAC)
- Head coach: Rob Senderoff (10th season)
- Assistant coaches: Matt Sligh (3rd season); Julian Sullinger (3rd season); Aaron Fuss (2nd season)
- Home arena: MAC Center

2020–21 Mid-American Conference men's basketball standings
	Conf.				Overall
Team	W		L	PCT	W		L	PCT
Toledo	15	–	4	.789	21	–	9	.700
Buffalo	12	–	5	.706	16	–	9	.640
Akron	12	–	6	.667	15	–	8	.652
Kent State	12	–	6	.667	15	–	8	.652
Ohio †	9	–	5	.643	17	–	8	.680
Bowling Green	10	–	8	.556	14	–	12	.538
Miami (OH)	9	–	8	.529	12	–	11	.522
Ball State	8	–	9	.471	10	–	13	.435
Western Michigan	4	–	12	.250	5	–	16	.238
Eastern Michigan	3	–	11	.214	6	–	12	.333
Central Michigan	3	–	13	.188	7	–	16	.304
Northern Illinois	2	–	12	.143	3	–	16	.158
† 2021 MAC tournament winner

The 2020–21 Kent State Golden Flashes men's basketball team represented Kent State University in the 2020–21 NCAA Division I men's basketball season. The Golden Flashes, led by 10th-year head coach Rob Senderoff, played their home games at the Memorial Athletic and Convocation Center, also known as the MAC Center, in Kent, Ohio as members of the East Division of the Mid-American Conference (MAC). It was the program's 105th season of play and 70th as a member of the MAC.

== Previous season ==
The Golden Flashes finished the 2019–20 season 20–12 overall, 9–9 in MAC play, to finish fourth place in the East Division. They defeated Eastern Michigan in the first round of the MAC tournament before the rest of the tournament was cancelled due to the COVID-19 pandemic.

== Offseason ==
=== Departures ===
Name	Number	Pos.	Height	Weight	Year	Hometown	Reason for departure
Jon King	0	G	6'5"	195	Freshman	Akron, OH	Walk-on; did not return
CJ Williamson	1	G	6'6"	200	Senior	Orlando, FL	Graduated
Troy Simons	3	G	6'3"	195	Senior	Pittsburgh, PA	Graduated
Antonio Williams	4	G	6'0"	185	Senior	Chicago, IL	Graduated
Mitch Peterson	13	G	6'5"	199	Senior	Richfield, OH	Graduated
Anthony Roberts	15	G	6'4"	190	Sophomore	Detroit, MI	Transferred to St. Bonaventure
Sentwali Nalls	21	G	6'1"	165	Freshman	Chicago, IL	Walk-on; did not return
Anyeuri Castillo	22	F	6'7"	195	JR	Santo Domingo, Dominican Republic	Transferred to USC Aiken
Phillip Whittington	25	F	6'8"	227	Senior	Los Angeles, CA	Graduated

=== Incoming transfers ===
Name	Number	Pos.	Height	Weight	Year	Hometown	Previous school
Malique Jacobs	2	G	6'4"	190	Junior	Wilmington, NC	Transferred from Indian Hills CC. Will have two years of remaining eligibility.
Tekorian Smith	4	G	6'4"	185	Junior	Memphis, TN	Transferred from Polk State College. Will have two years of remaining eligibility.
Justyn Hamilton	21	F	6'11"	220	Senior	Charlotte, NC	Transferred from Temple. Will have one year of remaining eligibility.
Gabe O'Neal	32	F	6'7"	240	Junior	Cincinnati, OH	Transferred from Mineral Area College. Will have two years of remaining eligibility.
James Jordan	55	G	6'5"	180	Junior	Detroit, MI	Transferred from Roane State CC. Will have two years of remaining eligibility.

=== 2020 recruiting class ===
College recruiting information
Name	Hometown	School	Height	Weight	Commit date
VonCameron Davis; SG	Columbus, OH	Walnut Ridge	6 ft 5 in (1.96 m)	N/A	Nov 13, 2019
VonCameron Davis; SG	Recruit ratings: Scout: Rivals: 247Sports: ESPN:				
Overall recruit ranking:
Note: In many cases, Scout, Rivals, 247Sports, On3, and ESPN may conflict in their listings of height and weight.; In these cases, the average was taken. ESPN grades are on a 100-point scale.; Sources: "2020 Team Ranking". Rivals.

== Roster ==
2020–21 Kent State Golden Flashes men's basketball team
Players
Coaches

Pos.	#	Name	Height	Weight	Year	Hometown
G	1	Michael Nuga	6 ft 2 in (1.88 m)	180 lb (82 kg)	RS Sr	Toronto, ON
G	2	Malique Jacobs	6 ft 4 in (1.93 m)	190 lb (86 kg)	Jr	Wilmington, NC
F	3	VonCameron Davis	6 ft 5 in (1.96 m)	210 lb (95 kg)	Fr	Columbus, OH
G	4	Tekorian Smith (T)	6 ft 4 in (1.93 m)	185 lb (84 kg)	Jr	Memphis, TN
F	5	Danny Pippen	6 ft 9 in (2.06 m)	232 lb (105 kg)	RS Sr	Detroit, MI
G	11	Giovanni Santiago	6 ft 1 in (1.85 m)	155 lb (70 kg)	So	Bayamón, Puerto Rico
F	14	Tervell Beck	6 ft 7 in (2.01 m)	230 lb (104 kg)	Sr	Cleveland, OH
G	15	Mike Digiulio	6 ft 0 in (1.83 m)	170 lb (77 kg)	Fr	Buffalo, NY
F	21	Justyn Hamilton	6 ft 11 in (2.11 m)	220 lb (100 kg)	Sr	Charlotte, NC
F	23	Evan Bainbridge	6 ft 9 in (2.06 m)	205 lb (93 kg)	So	Stow, OH
F	32	Gabe O'Neal	6 ft 7 in (2.01 m)	240 lb (109 kg)	Jr	Cincinnati, OH
G	33	Jeremiah Hernandez	6 ft 4 in (1.93 m)	175 lb (79 kg)	RS Fr	Chicago, IL
F	40	Jarred Logan	6 ft 5 in (1.96 m)	200 lb (91 kg)	Fr	Elyria, OH
C	50	Kalin Bennett (T)	6 ft 11 in (2.11 m)	300 lb (136 kg)	So	Little Rock, AR
G	55	James Jordan	6 ft 5 in (1.96 m)	180 lb (82 kg)	Jr	Detroit, MI

Head coach

- Rob Senderoff (Albany/Miami (FL))

Assistant coach(es)

- Aaron Fuss (Ohio State)
- Matt Sligh (Northwest Missouri State)
- Julian Sullinger (Kent State)

Legend

- (C) Team captain
- (S) Suspended
- (I) Ineligible
- (W) Walk-on
- (T) Transferred
- Injured
- Current redshirt

Roster
Last update: November 23, 2020

== Schedule and results ==
Kent State had to cancel games against Alcorn State, Purdue Fort Wayne, Eastern Michigan and Ohio, due to COVID-19 issues at those respective programs. They also postponed games against Akron, Bowling Green and Ball State.

Date time, TV	Rank^{#}	Opponent^{#}	Result	Record	High points	High rebounds	High assists	Site (attendance) city, state
Non-conference regular season
November 28, 2020*; Canceled		Alcorn State	Canceled due to COVID-19 issues at Alcorn State					MAC Center; Kent, OH
November 30, 2020*; Canceled		Purdue Fort Wayne	Canceled due to COVID-19 issues at Purdue Fort Wayne					MAC Center; Kent, OH
December 2, 2020*; 5:00 p.m.		Point Park	W 90–41	1–0	17 – Nuga	14 – Hamilton	4 – Jacobs	MAC Center; Kent, OH
December 4, 2020*; 6:00 p.m., ACCN		at No. 15 Virginia	L 64–71 ^{OT}	1–1	20 – Nuga	6 – Nuga	3 – Jacobs	John Paul Jones Arena; Charlottesville, VA
December 8, 2020*; 7:00 p.m., ESPN+		at Detroit Mercy	W 80–66	2–1	23 – Pippen	13 – Hamilton	4 – Nuga	Calihan Hall; Detroit, MI
December 13, 2020*; 2:00 p.m.		Northern Kentucky	W 92–73	3–1	22 – Hamilton	9 – O'Neal	7 – tied	MAC Center; Kent, OH
MAC regular season
January 1, 2021; 7:00 p.m., CBSSN		at Akron	L 62–66	3–2 (0–1)	19 – Nuga	9 – Pippen	6 – Santiago	James A. Rhodes Arena; Akron, OH
January 2, 2021; Canceled		at Eastern Michigan	Canceled due to COVID-19 issues at Eastern Michigan					Convocation Center; Ypsilanti, MI
January 5, 2021; 2:00 p.m., ESPN3		Toledo	L 82–84	3–3 (0–2)	34 – Pippen	16 – Pippen	5 – tied	MAC Center; Kent, OH
January 9, 2021; 4:00 p.m., ESPN3		Western Michigan	W 80–54	4–3 (1–2)	26 – Nuga	10 – Hamilton	3 – tied	MAC Center; Kent, OH
January 12, 2021; 4:30 p.m., ESPN+		at Central Michigan	W 94–85	5–3 (2–2)	28 – Pippen	11 – Pippen	4 – tied	McGuirk Arena; Mt. Pleasant, MI
January 16, 2021; 2:00 p.m., ESPN+		at Ohio	W 89–79	6–3 (3–2)	22 – Pippen	10 – Nuga	6 – Santiago	Convocation Center; Athens, OH
January 19, 2021; 5:00 p.m., ESPN+		Buffalo	W 84–81	7–3 (4–2)	23 – Nuga	7 – tied	6 – Jacobs	MAC Center; Kent, OH
January 23, 2021; 12:00 p.m., ESPN3		at Toledo	L 74–76	7–4 (4–3)	19 – Nuga	12 – Pippen	4 – tied	Savage Arena; Toledo, OH
January 27, 2021; 5:00 p.m., ESPN+		Bowling Green	W 96–91	8–4 (5–3)	34 – Pippen	10 – Pippen	4 – tied	MAC Center; Kent, OH
January 30, 2021; 4:00 p.m., ESPN3		Central Michigan	W 83–76	9–4 (6–3)	26 – Pippen	12 – Hamilton	6 – Santiago	MAC Center; Kent, OH
February 2, 2021; 7:00 p.m., ESPN3		Miami (OH)	W 77–68	10–4 (7–3)	30 – Pippen	8 – Jacobs	6 – Jacobs	MAC Center; Kent, OH
February 5, 2021; 7:00 p.m., ESPNU		Akron	L 61–72	10–5 (7–4)	17 – Pippen	11 – Pippen	5 – Pippen	MAC Center; Kent, OH
February 9, 2021; 7:00 p.m., CBSSN		at Bowling Green	W 71–67	11–5 (8–4)	18 – Beck	11 – Pippen	5 – Jacobs	Stroh Center; Bowling Green, OH
February 13, 2021; 2:00 p.m., ESPN3		Northern Illinois	W 80–58	12–5 (9–4)	13 – Jacobs	8 – tied	6 – Santiago	MAC Center; Kent, OH
February 16, 2021; 7:00 p.m., ESPN3		at Western Michigan	W 76–69	13–5 (10–4)	22 – Santiago	8 – Beck	2 – Hernandez	University Arena; Kalamazoo, MI
February 20, 2021; 2:00 p.m., ESPN3		Eastern Michigan	W 64–51	14–5 (11–4)	25 – Pippen	10 – Pippen	9 – Pippen	MAC Center; Kent, OH
February 24, 2021; 2:00 p.m., ESPN3		at Ball State	L 71–90	14–6 (11–5)	23 – Jacobs	7 – Jacobs	3 – tied	Worthen Arena (109); Muncie, IN
February 27, 2021; 4:30 p.m., ESPN3		at Miami (OH)	W 64–51	15–6 (12–5)	19 – Beck	12 – Beck	4 – Jacobs	Millett Hall; Oxford, OH
March 2, 2021; Canceled		Ohio	Canceled due to COVID-19 issues at Ohio					MAC Center; Kent, OH
March 5, 2021; 6:00 p.m., ESPNU		at Buffalo	L 67–81	15–7 (12–6)	19 – Beck	6 – tied	7 – Santiago	Alumni Arena; Buffalo, NY
MAC tournament
March 11, 2021; 2:05 p.m., ESPN+	(4)	vs. (5) Ohio; Quarterfinals	L 63–85	15–8	16 – tied	6 – Hamilton	5 – Santiago	Rocket Mortgage FieldHouse; Cleveland, OH
*Non-conference game. ^{#}Rankings from AP poll. (#) Tournament seedings in parentheses. All times are in Eastern.
