= 2020–21 Miami RedHawks men's basketball team =

American college basketball season

2020–21 Miami RedHawks men's basketball
- Conference: Mid-American Conference
- East Division
- Record: 12–11 (9–8 MAC)
- Head coach: Jack Owens (4th season)
- Assistant coaches: Jeff Rutter (4th season); J.R. Reynolds (4th season); Kenneth Lowe (4th season)
- Home arena: Millett Hall

2020–21 Mid-American Conference men's basketball standings
	Conf.				Overall
Team	W		L	PCT	W		L	PCT
Toledo	15	–	4	.789	21	–	9	.700
Buffalo	12	–	5	.706	16	–	9	.640
Akron	12	–	6	.667	15	–	8	.652
Kent State	12	–	6	.667	15	–	8	.652
Ohio †	9	–	5	.643	17	–	8	.680
Bowling Green	10	–	8	.556	14	–	12	.538
Miami (OH)	9	–	8	.529	12	–	11	.522
Ball State	8	–	9	.471	10	–	13	.435
Western Michigan	4	–	12	.250	5	–	16	.238
Eastern Michigan	3	–	11	.214	6	–	12	.333
Central Michigan	3	–	13	.188	7	–	16	.304
Northern Illinois	2	–	12	.143	3	–	16	.158
† 2021 MAC tournament winner

The 2020–21 Miami RedHawks men's basketball team represented Miami University in the 2020–21 NCAA Division I men's basketball season. The RedHawks, led by 4th-year head coach Jack Owens, played their home games at Millett Hall in Oxford, Ohio as members of the East Division of the Mid-American Conference.

== Previous season ==
The RedHawks finished the 2019–20 season 13–19 overall, 5–13 in MAC play to finish in fifth place in the East Division. As the No. 12 seed in the MAC tournament, they defeated Buffalo in the first round before the tournament was cancelled due to the COVID-19 pandemic.

== Offseason ==
=== Departures ===
Name	Number	Pos.	Height	Weight	Year	Hometown	Reason for departure
Nike Sibande	1	G	6'4"	183	Junior	Indianapolis, IN	Transferred to Pittsburgh
Bam Bowman	14	F	6'8"	273	Senior	Bowling Green, KY	Graduated

== Roster ==
2020–21 Miami RedHawks men's basketball team
Players
Coaches

Pos.	#	Name	Height	Weight	Year	Hometown
F	0	Javin Etzler	6 ft 8 in (2.03 m)	205 lb (93 kg)	RS Fr	Convoy, Ohio
F	1	Josh Brewer	6 ft 5 in (1.96 m)	185 lb (84 kg)	Jr	Indianapolis, Indiana
G	2	Mekhi Lairy	5 ft 8 in (1.73 m)	140 lb (64 kg)	Jr	Evansville, Indiana
G	3	Dae Dae Grant	6 ft 2 in (1.88 m)	185 lb (84 kg)	So	Lorain, Ohio
G	4	Isaiah Coleman-Lands	6 ft 0 in (1.83 m)	165 lb (75 kg)	RS Jr	Indianapolis, Indiana
F	5	Precious Ayah	6 ft 6 in (1.98 m)	235 lb (107 kg)	RS Sr	Bayelsa State, Nigeria
F	11	James Beck	6 ft 8 in (2.03 m)	215 lb (98 kg)	RS Jr	Grand Rapids, Michigan
F	13	Dalonte Brown	6 ft 7 in (2.01 m)	205 lb (93 kg)	Sr	Toledo, Ohio
F	14	Luka Eller	6 ft 7 in (2.01 m)	220 lb (100 kg)	Fr	Mentor, Ohio
G	15	Milos Jovic	6 ft 4 in (1.93 m)	200 lb (91 kg)	RS Sr	Leskovac, Serbia
G	20	Benjamin Litteken	6 ft 1 in (1.85 m)	190 lb (86 kg)	Sr	St. Louis, Missouri
C	21	Jackson Ames	6 ft 11 in (2.11 m)	255 lb (116 kg)	Fr	Batavia, Ohio
G	22	Myja White	6 ft 1 in (1.85 m)	185 lb (84 kg)	RS So	Terre Haute, Indiana
F	24	Michael Ritchie	6 ft 5 in (1.96 m)	200 lb (91 kg)	Sr	Mount Prospect, Illinois
G	30	Bryson Tatum	6 ft 4 in (1.93 m)	180 lb (82 kg)	Fr	Urbana, Illinois
F	33	Elijah McNamara	6 ft 9 in (2.06 m)	205 lb (93 kg)	Jr	Pickerington, Ohio

Head coach

- Jack Owens (Eastern Illinois)

Assistant coach(es)

- Jeff Rutter (Winona State)
- J.R. Reynolds (Eastern Illinois)
- Kenneth Lowe (Purdue)

Legend

- (C) Team captain
- (S) Suspended
- (I) Ineligible
- (W) Walk-on
- Injured
- Current redshirt

Roster
Last update: March 29, 2021

== Schedule and results ==
Miami had to cancel its game against Defiance due to COVID-19. They have postponed their games against Ohio, Central Michigan, Western Michigan, and Eastern Michigan. They have canceled a game against Akron.

Date time, TV	Rank^{#}	Opponent^{#}	Result	Record	High points	High rebounds	High assists	Site (attendance) city, state
Non-conference regular season
November 25, 2020*; 1:00 p.m., ESPN3		North Dakota	W 81–67	1–0	21 – Grant	10 – Beck	4 – Grant	Millett Hall (0); Oxford, OH
November 30, 2020*; Canceled		Defiance	Canceled					Millett Hall; Oxford, OH
December 5, 2020*; 4:00 p.m., ESPN3		at Wright State	L 47–71	1–1	9 – Etzler	7 – Brown	2 – Tied	Nutter Center (0); Dayton, OH
December 9, 2020*; 5:30 p.m., ESPN+		Western Illinois	W 67–57	2-1	19 – Brown	16 – Brown	4 – Tied	Millett Hall (0); Oxford, OH
December 11, 2020*; 5:30 p.m., ESPN+		Mount St. Joseph	W 79–64	3–1	21 – Lairy	10 – Beck	4 – Grant	Millett Hall (0); Oxford, OH
December 15, 2020; 5:30 p.m., ESPN+		Buffalo	L 62–90	3–2 (0–1)	12 – Coleman–Lands	6 – Brewer	3 – Tied	Millett Hall (0); Oxford, OH
December 19, 2020*; 8:00 p.m., ESPN3		at Bradley	L 68-69	3–3	17 – Brown	11 – Brown	7 – Lairy	Carver Arena (0); Peoria, IL
December 21, 2020*; Canceled		Defiance	Canceled					Millett Hall; Oxford, OH
MAC regular season
December 29, 2020; Postponed		Ohio	Postponed					Millett Hall; Oxford, OH
January 2, 2021; Postponed		at Central Michigan	Postponed					McGuirk Arena; Mt. Pleasant, MI
January 9, 2021; 1:00 p.m., ESPN+		Northern Illinois	W 70–58	4–3 (1–1)	15 – McMamara	4 – Coleman-Lands	5 – Lairy	Millett Hall (0); Oxford, OH
January 12, 2021; 3:00 p.m.		at Ohio	L 61–78	4–4 (1–2)	16 – Brown	5 – Brown	6 – Coleman–Lands	Convocation Center (0); Athens, OH
January 16, 2021; Postponed		at Western Michigan	Postponed					University Arena; Kalamazoo, MI
January 19, 2021; 7:00 p.m., ESPN3		Ball State	W 71–61	5–4 (2–2)	17 – Tied	11 – Beck	5 – Lairy	Millett Hall (0); Oxford, OH
January 21, 2021; 5:30 p.m., ESPN3		at Bowling Green	W 96–77	6–4 (3–2)	27 – Grant	11 – Brown	5 – Tied	Millett Hall (0); Oxford, OH
January 23, 2021; 5:30 p.m., ESPN3		at Eastern Michigan	W 85–63	7–4 (4–2)	28 – Grant	7 – Brown	3 – Coleman-Lands	Convocation Center (100); Ypsilanti, MI
January 26, 2021; 7:00 p.m., ESPN+		Toledo	L 81–90	7–5 (4–3)	17 – Lairy	7 – Brown	5 – Lairy	Millett Hall (0); Oxford, OH
January 30, 2021; 2:00 p.m., ESPN3		Western Michigan	W 65–56	8–5 (5–3)	16 – Brown	9 – Beck	6 – Lairy	Millett Hall (0); Oxford, OH
February 2, 2021; 6:00 p.m., ESPN3		at Kent State	L 68–77	8–6 (5–4)	17 – Grant	7 – Brown	4 – Grant	MAC Center (0); Kent, OH
February 6, 2021; 2:00 p.m., ESPN3		at Buffalo	L 64–88	8–7 (5–5)	24 – Beck	8 – Beck	6 – Coleman–Lands	Alumni Arena (0); Buffalo, NY
February 9, 2021; Postponed		Eastern Michigan	Postponed					Millett Hall; Oxford, OH
February 12, 2021; 7:00 p.m., ESPNU		Akron	L 76–83	8–8 (5–6)	24 – Lairy	10 – Brown	3 – Tied	Millett Hall (0); Oxford, OH
February 16, 2021; 7:00 p.m., ESPN3		at Toledo	L 75–87	8–9 (5–7)	21 – Brown	12 – Etzler	5 – Grant	Savage Arena (0); Toledo, OH
February 20, 2021; 5:00 p.m., ESPN3		at Northern Illinois	W 69–64	9–9 (6–7)	26 – Grant	12 – Brown	4 – Lairy	Convocation Center (23); DeKalb, IL
February 23, 2021; 5:00 pm EST, ESPN3		at Central Michigan	W 96–54	10–9 (7–7)	25 – Grant	8 – Coleman-Lands	6 – Coleman-Lands	Mcguirk Arena (0); Mount Pleasant, MI
February 25, 2021; TBA, ESPN3		at Western Michigan	W 74–66	11–9 (8–7)	20 – Brown	10 – Ayah	3 – White	University Arena (100); Kalamazoo, MI
February 27, 2021; 4:30 pm EST, ESPN3		at Kent State	L 64–51	11–10 (8–8)	14 – White	6 – Ayah	5 – Lairy	Millett Hall (0); Oxford, OH
March 2, 2021; 7:00 p.m., ESPN3		at Bowling Green	W 84–79 ^{OT}	12–10 (9–8)	29 – Brown	14 – Brown	5 – Lairy	Stroh Center (300); Bowling Green, OH
March 5, 2021; Canceled		Akron	Canceled					Rhodes Arena; Akron, OH
MAC tournament
March 11, 2021; 4:30 P.M., ESPN+	(7)	vs. (2) Buffalo; Quarterfinals	L 63–74	12–11	17 – Brown	6 – Tied	3 – Tied	Rocket Mortgage FieldHouse; Cleveland, OH
*Non-conference game. ^{#}Rankings from AP Poll. (#) Tournament seedings in parentheses. All times are in Eastern Time.
