= 2021 MAC men's basketball tournament =

Sports competition

- Classification: Division I
- Season: 2020–21
- Teams: 8
- Site: Rocket Mortgage FieldHouse; Cleveland, Ohio
- Champions: Ohio (7th title)
- Winning coach: Jeff Boals (1st title)
- MVP: Jason Preston (Ohio)
- Television: CBSSN, ESPN2, ESPN+
- MAC men's basketball tournaments

2020–21 Mid-American Conference men's basketball standings
	Conf.				Overall
Team	W		L	PCT	W		L	PCT
Toledo	15	–	4	.789	21	–	9	.700
Buffalo	12	–	5	.706	16	–	9	.640
Akron	12	–	6	.667	15	–	8	.652
Kent State	12	–	6	.667	15	–	8	.652
Ohio †	9	–	5	.643	17	–	8	.680
Bowling Green	10	–	8	.556	14	–	12	.538
Miami (OH)	9	–	8	.529	12	–	11	.522
Ball State	8	–	9	.471	10	–	13	.435
Western Michigan	4	–	12	.250	5	–	16	.238
Eastern Michigan	3	–	11	.214	6	–	12	.333
Central Michigan	3	–	13	.188	7	–	16	.304
Northern Illinois	2	–	12	.143	3	–	16	.158
† 2021 MAC tournament winner

The 2021 Mid-American Conference men's basketball tournament was the postseason men's basketball tournament for the Mid-American Conference (MAC). Due to the ongoing COVID-19 pandemic, the entire tournament was held at Rocket Mortgage FieldHouse, in Cleveland, Ohio, from March 11–13, 2021. For the 2021 tournament, only the top eight teams qualified. The winner of the tournament received the MAC's automatic bid to the 2021 NCAA tournament. Ohio defeated Buffalo in the final. Jason Preston of Ohio was named the tournament MVP. In the NCAA tournament Ohio defeated No. 4-seeded Virginia in the First Round before falling to No. 5-seeded Creighton in the Second Round.

== Seeds ==
8 out of the 12 MAC teams qualified for the tournament. Teams were seeded by record within the conference, with a tiebreaker system to seed teams with identical conference records.

Seed	School	Conference record	Tiebreaker
1	Toledo	15–4	
2	Buffalo	12–5	
3	Akron	12–6	2–0 vs. KSU
4	Kent State	12–6	0–2 vs. Akron
5	Ohio	9–5	
6	Bowling Green	10–8	
7	Miami (OH)	9–8	
8	Ball State	8–9	
DNQ	Western Michigan	4–12	
DNQ	Eastern Michigan	3–11	
DNQ	Central Michigan	3–13	
DNQ	Northern Illinois	2–12	

== Schedule ==
Game	Time	Matchup	Score	Television
Quarterfinals – Thursday, March 11 – Rocket Mortgage FieldHouse, Cleveland, OH
1	11:00 am	No. 8 Ball State vs. No. 1 Toledo	89–91^{OT}	ESPN+
2	2:05 pm	No. 5 Ohio vs. No. 4 Kent State	85–63	ESPN+
3	4:30 pm	No. 7 Miami (OH) vs. No. 2 Buffalo	63–74	ESPN+
4	7:00 pm	No. 6 Bowling Green vs. No. 3 Akron	67–74	ESPN+
Semifinals – Friday, March 12 – Rocket Mortgage FieldHouse, Cleveland, OH
5	5:00 pm	No. 5 Ohio vs. No. 1 Toledo	87–80	CBSSN
6	approx. 7:30 pm	No. 3 Akron vs. No. 2 Buffalo	74–81^{OT}	CBSSN
Championship – Saturday, March 13 – Rocket Mortgage FieldHouse, Cleveland, OH
7	7:30 pm	No. 5 Ohio vs. No. 2 Buffalo	84–69	ESPN2
Game times in ET. Rankings denote tournament seed

== Bracket ==
Quarterfinals; Thursday, March 11, 2021; ESPN+
1	Toledo	91*
8	Ball State	89
4	Kent State	63
5	Ohio	85
2	Buffalo	74
7	Miami (OH)	63
3	Akron	74
6	Bowling Green	67

Semifinals; Friday, March 12, 2021; CBSSN
1	Toledo	80
5	Ohio	87
2	Buffalo	81*
3	Akron	74

Championship; Saturday, March 13, 2021; ESPN2
5	Ohio	84
2	Buffalo	69

* denotes overtime period

== All-Tournament Team ==
Tournament MVP – Jason Preston, Ohio

Player	Team
Marreon Jackson	Toledo
Josh Mballa	Buffalo
Jeenathan Williams	Buffalo
Jason Preston	Ohio
Ben Vander Plas	Ohio
