= 2020–21 Central Michigan Chippewas men's basketball team =

American college basketball season

2020–21 Central Michigan Chippewas men's basketball
- Conference: Mid-American Conference
- Record: 7–16 (3–13 MAC)
- Head coach: Keno Davis (9th season)
- Assistant coaches: Chris Davis; Chris Tifft; DJ Mocini
- Home arena: McGuirk Arena

2020–21 Mid-American Conference men's basketball standings
	Conf.				Overall
Team	W		L	PCT	W		L	PCT
Toledo	15	–	4	.789	21	–	9	.700
Buffalo	12	–	5	.706	16	–	9	.640
Akron	12	–	6	.667	15	–	8	.652
Kent State	12	–	6	.667	15	–	8	.652
Ohio †	9	–	5	.643	17	–	8	.680
Bowling Green	10	–	8	.556	14	–	12	.538
Miami (OH)	9	–	8	.529	12	–	11	.522
Ball State	8	–	9	.471	10	–	13	.435
Western Michigan	4	–	12	.250	5	–	16	.238
Eastern Michigan	3	–	11	.214	6	–	12	.333
Central Michigan	3	–	13	.188	7	–	16	.304
Northern Illinois	2	–	12	.143	3	–	16	.158
† 2021 MAC tournament winner

The 2020–21 Central Michigan Chippewas men's basketball team represented Central Michigan University in the 2020–21 NCAA Division I men's basketball season. The Chippewas, led by ninth-year head coach Keno Davis, played their home games at McGuirk Arena in Mount Pleasant, Michigan as members of the Mid-American Conference (MAC). Starting this season, the MAC announced the removal of divisions. The Chippewas finished the season 7–16, 3–13 in MAC play, to finish in 11th place. They failed to qualify for the MAC tournament.

Following the season, the school fired head coach Davis after nine years.

== Previous season ==
The Chippewas finished the 2019–20 season 14–18, 7–11 in MAC play, to finish in fourth place in the West Division. They lost in the first round of the MAC tournament to Ohio.

== Offseason ==
=== Departures ===
Name	Number	Pos.	Height	Weight	Year	Hometown	Reason for departure
Corey Redman	1	G	6' 6"	192	Senior	Boyne City, MI	Graduated
Rob Montgomery	5	F	6' 7"	230	Senior	Montgomery Village, MD	Graduated
Deschon Winston	11	G	6' 4"	175	Junior	Woodland Hills, CA	Opted out of season; Entered transfer portal
Kevin Hamlet	12	F	6' 7"	220	RS Junior	Scarborough, ON	Left team for personal reasons
David DiLeo	14	F	6' 8"	224	Senior	Iowa City, IA	Graduated
Matty Smith	15	G	5' 11"	180	Senior	Elgin, IL	Graduated
Kevin McKay	20	G	6' 5"	228	Senior	Warren, MI	Graduated
Dallas Morgan	23	G	6' 2"	202	Senior	Peoria, IL	Graduated
Romelo Burrell	24	F	6' 7"	181	Junior	Chicago, IL	Transferred to Lindenwood
Michael Kemp	31	F	6' 3"	195	Junior	Mendon, MI	Walk-on; did not return

=== Incoming transfers ===
Name	Number	Pos.	Height	Weight	Year	Hometown	Previous school
Ralph Bissainthe	1	F	6' 7"	205	RS Junior	North Miami, FL	Florida SouthWestern State
Caleb Huffman	4	G	6' 4"	185	Junior	Broken Arrow, OK	Iowa Western Community College
Meikkel Murray	5	G	6' 6"	190	Junior	The Bronx, NY	Coffeyville Community College
Malik Muhammad	25	F	6' 9"	235	Junior	Los Angeles, CA	East Los Angeles College

=== 2020 recruiting class ===
College recruiting
Name	Hometown	School	Height	Weight	Commit date
Ra'Shad Weekly-McDaniels; PG	St. Louis, MO	Trinity Catholic High School	5 ft 10 in (1.78 m)	215 lb (98 kg)	
Ra'Shad Weekly-McDaniels; PG	Recruit ratings: Scout: Rivals: (NR)				
Overall recruit ranking:
Note: In many cases, Scout, Rivals, 247Sports, On3, and ESPN may conflict in their listings of height and weight.; In these cases, the average was taken. ESPN grades are on a 100-point scale.; Sources: "2020 Team Ranking". Rivals.

== Roster ==
2020–21 Central Michigan Chippewas men's basketball team
Players
Coaches

Pos.	#	Name	Height	Weight	Year	Previous school	Hometown
G	0	Travon Broadway Jr.	6 ft 5 in (1.96 m)	182 lb (83 kg)	Sr	Iowa Western Community College	Miami, FL
F	1	Ralph Bissainthe	6 ft 7 in (2.01 m)	205 lb (93 kg)	RS Jr	Florida SouthWestern State	North Miami, FL
G	2	Devontae Lane	6 ft 3 in (1.91 m)	205 lb (93 kg)	Sr	Indian Hills Community College	Iowa City, IA
G	3	PJ Mitchell	6 ft 0 in (1.83 m)	188 lb (85 kg)	RS So	Detroit Edison Public School Academy	Detroit, MI
G	4	Caleb Huffman	6 ft 4 in (1.93 m)	185 lb (84 kg)	Jr	Iowa Western Community College	Broken Arrow, OK
G	5	Meikkel Murray	6 ft 6 in (1.98 m)	190 lb (86 kg)	Jr	Coffeyville Community College	The Bronx, NY
G	10	Dylan Jergens	6 ft 0 in (1.83 m)	160 lb (73 kg)	RS Fr	Howardsville Christian School	Mendon, MI
F	12	Tyler Hankins	6 ft 9 in (2.06 m)	225 lb (102 kg)	Sr	South Elgin High School	Bartlett, IL
F	15	Aundre Polk	6 ft 10 in (2.08 m)	210 lb (95 kg)	Fr	SPIRE Institute	Detroit, MI
G	20	Ra'Shad Weekly-McDaniels	6 ft 1 in (1.85 m)	215 lb (98 kg)	Fr	Trinity Catholic High School	St. Louis, MO
G	22	Matt Beachler	6 ft 4 in (1.93 m)	200 lb (91 kg)	RS Jr	Lowell High School	Lowell, MI
F	25	Malik Muhammad	6 ft 9 in (2.06 m)	235 lb (107 kg)	Jr	East Los Angeles College	Los Angeles, CA
G	31	Preston Enloe	6 ft 3 in (1.91 m)	190 lb (86 kg)	RS Jr	Tarleton State	Plano, TX
F	34	Caleb Hodgson	6 ft 10 in (2.08 m)	235 lb (107 kg)	RS Fr	Dansville High School	Dansville, MI

Head coach

- Keno Davis (Iowa)

Assistant coach(es)

- Chris Davis (Michigan)
- Chris Tifft (Nevada)
- DJ Mocini (Dayton)

Legend

- (C) Team captain
- (S) Suspended
- (I) Ineligible
- (W) Walk-on
- Injured
- Current redshirt

Roster
Last update: February 2, 2021

== Schedule and results ==
Date time, TV	Rank^{#}	Opponent^{#}	Result	Record	Site (attendance) city, state
Regular season
November 28, 2020*; 7:00 p.m., ESPN3		at UIC	L 72–74	0–1	Credit Union 1 Arena; Chicago, IL
December 1, 2020*; 7:00 p.m., CUSA.TV		at FIU	L 76–96	0–2	Ocean Bank Convocation Center (351); Miami, FL
December 2, 2020*; 7:00 p.m.		vs. Flagler	L 73–92	0–3	Ocean Bank Convocation Center (43); Miami, FL
December 6, 2020*; 3:30 p.m., Leatherneck All-Access		at Western Illinois	W 79–73	1–3	Western Hall; Macomb, IL
December 12, 2020*; 4:30 p.m., ESPN3		Valparaiso	W 84–79	2–3	McGuirk Arena; Mount Pleasant, MI
December 14, 2020*; 4:30 p.m., CSN Digital		St. Francis (IL)	W 91–39	3–3	McGuirk Arena; Mount Pleasant, MI
December 18, 2021; 2:00 p.m., ESPN3		at Western Michigan	L 61–76	3–4 (0–1)	University Arena; Kalamazoo, MI
December 20, 2020*; 1:00 p.m., CSN Digital		Olivet	W 127–66	4–4	McGuirk Arena; Mount Pleasant, MI
December 29, 2020; 7:00 p.m., ESPN3		at Eastern Michigan	W 87–60	5–4 (1–1)	Convocation Center; Ypsilanti, MI
January 2, 2021; ESPN3/ESPN+		Miami (OH)	Postponed		McGuirk Arena; Mount Pleasant, MI
January 5, 2021; 6:00 p.m., ESPN+		at Bowling Green	L 69–90	5–5 (1–2)	Stroh Center (300); Bowling Green, OH
January 9, 2021; 4:30 p.m., ESPN+		Bowling Green	L 65–93	5–6 (1–3)	McGuirk Arena; Mount Pleasant, MI
January 12, 2021; 4:30 p.m., ESPN+		Kent State	L 85–94	5–7 (1–4)	McGuirk Arena; Mount Pleasant, MI
January 16, 2021; 4:30 p.m., ESPN3		Eastern Michigan	W 75–64	6–7 (2–4)	McGuirk Arena; Mount Pleasant, MI
January 19, 2021; 7:00 p.m., ESPN+		at Toledo	L 72–89	6–8 (2–5)	Savage Arena; Toledo, OH
January 21, 2021; 6:00 p.m., ESPN+		at Akron	L 67–81	6–9 (2–6)	James A. Rhodes Arena; Akron, OH
January 26, 2021; 5:00 p.m., ESPN+		at Buffalo	Postponed		Alumni Arena; Amherst, NY
January 30, 2021; 4:00 p.m., ESPN3		at Kent State	L 76–83	6–10 (2–7)	MAC Center; Kent, Ohio
February 2, 2021; 5:00 p.m., ESPN3		Ohio	L 69–83	6–11 (2–8)	McGuirk Arena; Mount Pleasant, MI
February 6, 2021; 2:30 p.m., ESPN3		at Northern Illinois	Postponed		Convocation Center; DeKalb, IL
February 6, 2021; 2:00 p.m., ESPN+		Western Michigan	L 65–67	6–12 (2–9)	McGuirk Arena; Mount Pleasant, MI
February 9, 2021; 5:00 p.m., ESPN3		Ball State	Postponed		McGuirk Arena; Mount Pleasant, MI
February 12, 2021; 8:00 p.m., CBSSN		Buffalo	Postponed		McGuirk Arena; Mount Pleasant, MI
February 16, 2021; 6:00 p.m., ESPN+		at Ohio	Postponed		Convocation Center; Athens, OH
February 23, 2021; 5:00 p.m., ESPN3		Miami (OH)	L 54–96	6–13 (2–10)	McGuirk Arena; Mount Pleasant, MI
February 25, 2021; 2:00 p.m., ESPN+		at Buffalo	L 73–85	6–14 (2–11)	Alumni Arena; Amherst, NY
February 27, 2021; 1:00 p.m., ESPN3		at Ball State	L 91–97	6–15 (2–12)	Worthen Arena; Muncie, IN
March 2, 2021; 5:00 p.m., ESPN+		Toledo	W 81–79	7–15 (3–12)	McGuirk Arena; Mount Pleasant, MI
March 5, 2021; 5:00 p.m., ESPN3		Northern Illinois	L 74–79	7–16 (3–13)	McGuirk Arena; Mount Pleasant, MI
*Non-conference game. ^{#}Rankings from AP poll. (#) Tournament seedings in parentheses. All times are in Eastern.
