= Clayton Bates (basketball) =

American basketball coach (born 1972/73)

Biographical details
- Born: 1972 or 1973 (age 53–54)

Playing career
- 1992–1996: Florida

Coaching career (HC unless noted)
- 1998–2000: Jacksonville (assistant)
- 2000–2008: Western Michigan (assistant)
- 2009–2010: Western Michigan (assistant)
- 2010–2012: Wright State (assistant)
- 2012–2020: Western Michigan (assistant)
- 2020–2022: Western Michigan

Administrative career (AD unless noted)
- 1997–1998: Illinois (admin asst.)

Head coaching record
- Overall: 13–39 (.250)

Clayton Bates (born 1972/73) is an American basketball coach. He was most recently the men's head coach for the Western Michigan Broncos.

== Early life and education ==
Bates played basketball at Florida from 1992 to 1996. He helped the Gators reach the Final Four in 1994. Bates was the 1996 Most Outstanding Academic Player, and was named the 1996 Fred Koss Memorial Award winner. He earned a bachelor's degree in exercise physiology in 1995 and completed his master's degree in sports administration in 1997 at Illinois.

== Coaching career ==
Bates began his coaching career as an administrative assistant at Illinois in 1997 under Lon Kruger. Bates became an assistant at Jacksonville in 1998 under Hugh Durham. Bates joined Western Michigan as an assistant in 2000. He decided to take a year off from coaching in 2008, taking a job at a medical supply company to spend more time with his family. Bates returned to Western Michigan for the 2009–10 season. In 2010, Bates decided to become an assistant at Wright State. After two seasons, Bates became homesick for Kalamazoo and returned to Western Michigan. He helped the Broncos reach the NCAA tournament in 2014.

On March 28, 2020, Bates was promoted to head coach at Western Michigan, replacing his former boss Steve Hawkins. Athletic director Kathy Beauregard said the COVID-19 pandemic affected the job search but Bates was the right person for the job. Bates' salary increases from $110,000 to $120,000 per year, with an additional $100,000 for multimedia rights and speaking opportunities. He took over a program that finished 21–43 in the past two seasons, but he retained assistant coach Thomas Kelley. Shortly after he was hired, the top two scorers at Western Michigan, Michael Flowers and Brandon Johnson, decided to transfer. On March 7, 2022, Bates was fired, after finishing 5–16 in his first season and 8–23 in his second.

== Personal life ==
Bates is married to the former Annemarie Mernagh, who was an All-Big East volleyball player at the University of Pittsburgh and was an assistant volleyball coach at Western Michigan. They have two daughters, Annelyse and Sydney.

== Head coaching record ==
Record table
Season	Team	Overall	Conference	Standing	Postseason
Western Michigan (MAC) (2020–2022)
2020–21	Western Michigan	5–16	4–12	9th	
2021–22	Western Michigan	8–23	4–16	12th	
Western Michigan:		13–39 (.250)	8–28 (.222)		
Total:		13–39 (.250)			
National champion Postseason invitational champion Conference regular season champion Conference regular season and conference tournament champion Division regular season champion Division regular season and conference tournament champion Conference tournament champion
