= Jack Owens (basketball) =

American basketball player and coach

Current position
- Title: Assistant coach
- Team: DePaul Blue Demons
- Conference: Big East Conference

Biographical details
- Born: April 3, 1977 (age 49); Indianapolis, Indiana, U.S.

Playing career
- 1995–1996: Murray State
- 1996–1997: Howard CC
- 1997–1999: Eastern Illinois
- Position: Guard

Coaching career (HC unless noted)
- 2000–2001: Howard CC (assistant)
- 2000–2001: Howard CC (interim HC)
- 2001–2002: Barton CC (assistant)
- 2002–2003: Eastern Illinois (assistant)
- 2003–2008: Southern Illinois (assistant)
- 2008–2011: Purdue (assistant)
- 2011–2017: Purdue (AHC)
- 2017–2022: Miami (OH)
- 2022–2024: Ohio State (assistant)
- 2024–present: DePaul (assistant)

Head coaching record
- Overall: 70–83 (.458)

Jack Owens (born April 3, 1977) is an American college basketball coach who is currently an assistant coach for the DePaul Blue Demons men's basketball team. He previously was the head coach at Miami University.

== Head coaching record ==
Record table
Season	Team	Overall	Conference	Standing	Postseason
Miami RedHawks (Mid-American Conference) (2017–2022)
2017–18	Miami	16–18	8–10	3rd (East)	CBI First Round
2018–19	Miami	15–17	7–11	5th (East)	
2019–20	Miami	13–19	5–13	6th (East)	
2020–21	Miami	12–11	9–8	7th	
2021–22	Miami	14–18	8–12	7th	
Miami:		70–83 (.458)	37–54 (.407)		
Total:		70–83 (.458)			
National champion Postseason invitational champion Conference regular season champion Conference regular season and conference tournament champion Division regular season champion Division regular season and conference tournament champion Conference tournament champion
