= Jason Preston =

American basketball player (born 1999)

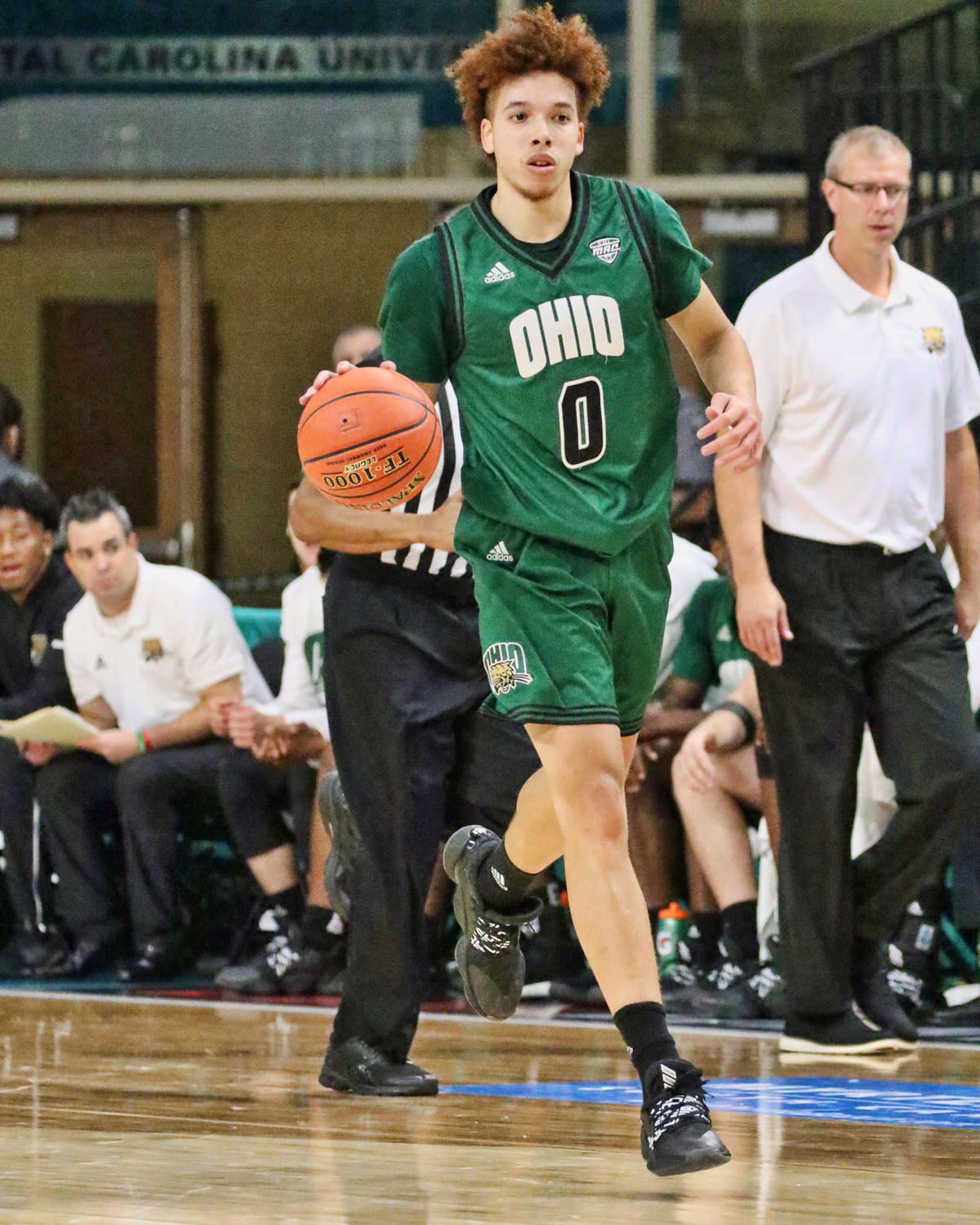
- Preston with Ohio in 2019

No. 9 – San Diego Clippers
- Position: Point guard
- League: NBA G League

Personal information
- Born: August 10, 1999 (age 27) Coral Springs, Florida, U.S.
- Listed height: 6 ft 3 in (1.91 m)
- Listed weight: 181 lb (82 kg)

Career information
- High school: Boone (Orlando, Florida); Believe Prep Academy (Athens, Tennessee)
- College: Ohio (2018–2021)
- NBA draft: 2021: 2nd round, 33rd overall pick
- Drafted by: Orlando Magic
- Playing career: 2021–present

Career history
- 2021–2023: Los Angeles Clippers
- 2022–2023: →Ontario Clippers
- 2023–2024: Memphis Hustle
- 2024: Utah Jazz
- 2024: →Salt Lake City Stars
- 2025–present: San Diego Clippers

Career highlights
- All-NBA G League First Team (2024); NBA G League assists leader (2024); First-team All-MAC (2021); Second-team All-MAC (2020); MAC All-Freshman Team (2019); MAC tournament MVP (2021)
- Stats at NBA.com
- Stats at Basketball Reference

Jason Preston (born August 10, 1999) is an American professional basketball player for the San Diego Clippers of the NBA G League. He played college basketball for the Ohio Bobcats. After three seasons at Ohio University, Preston was drafted 33rd overall by the Orlando Magic in the 2021 NBA draft and was traded to the Clippers.

== Early life ==
Preston played basketball for William R. Boone High School in Orlando, Florida, averaging two points per game over two years. He stood about 6 feet (1.83 m) tall and weighed 140 pounds (64 kg) out of high school and applied to the University of Central Florida as a regular student, planning to major in journalism. After competing on the Amateur Athletic Union circuit, Preston chose to play basketball at a prep school, joining Believe Prep Academy in Athens, Tennessee. He grew four inches (10 cm) and gained experience as a point guard. Preston averaged 12 points, nine assists and seven rebounds per game, leading his team to a 31–8 record. He started out playing for the B team and was elevated to the A team after a series of strong performances, but began playing for the C team after receiving little playing time. Preston eventually managed to rejoin the A team. After posting his highlights to Twitter, Preston received college basketball offers from Ohio and Longwood, eventually committing to play for Ohio.

== College career ==
As a freshman at Ohio University, Preston averaged six points, 3.6 rebounds and 3.4 assists per game, earning MAC All-Freshman Team honors. On November 13, 2019, he posted a sophomore season-high 27 points, 14 rebounds and five assists in an 81–72 win over Iona. On January 21, 2020, Preston recorded 27 points, eight assists and seven rebounds in an 83–74 loss to Toledo. On February 8, he scored 15 points, 10 rebounds and 10 assists, becoming the second player in program history to register a triple-double, in a 77–46 win over Miami (Ohio). As a sophomore, Preston averaged 16.8 points, 7.4 assists and 6.4 rebounds per game and was a Second Team All-MAC selection. He led the MAC and ranked second in the nation in assists.

On November 27, 2020, Preston recorded a career-high 31 points, eight assists and six rebounds in a 77–75 loss to eighth-ranked Illinois. His story drew national attention following the performance. On January 23, 2021, he posted his second triple-double, with 11 points, 11 assists and 10 rebounds in an 85–77 win against Ball State. Preston was named most valuable player of the MAC tournament after leading Ohio University to the title. On March 20, in the first round of the NCAA tournament, he helped the 13th-seeded Bobcats to a 62–58 upset victory over fourth-seeded Virginia, recording 11 points, 13 rebounds and eight assists. As a junior, Preston averaged 15.7 points, 7.3 rebounds and 7.3 assists per game, earning First Team All-MAC honors. On April 26, 2021, he declared for the 2021 NBA draft while maintaining his college eligibility. He later decided to remain in the draft. After beginning his professional NBA career, Preston completed his degree at Ohio University, graduating cum laude in 2022 with a Bachelor of Sport Management and a minor in Finance.

== Professional career ==
=== Los Angeles Clippers (2021–2023) ===
Preston was selected with the 33rd overall pick in the 2021 NBA draft by his hometown team, the Orlando Magic and was then traded to the Los Angeles Clippers. On August 9, 2021, Preston signed a three-year rookie-scale contract with the Clippers. On October 7, 2021, he underwent surgery after suffering an injury on his right foot during the preseason of his rookie campaign. Preston missed the entire 2021–22 season after undergoing surgery.

Preston made his NBA debut on October 23, 2022, playing three minutes in a 112–95 loss to the Phoenix Suns. He played sparingly in the 2022–23 season, appearing in only 14 games.

On October 1, 2023, Preston was waived by the Clippers.

=== Memphis Hustle (2023–2024) ===
On October 16, 2023, Preston signed with the Memphis Grizzlies, but was waived two days later. On October 30, he joined the Memphis Hustle.

=== Utah Jazz (2024) ===
On January 9, 2024, Preston signed a two-way contract with the Utah Jazz. Preston was waived by the Jazz on November 22 due to a left calf strain injury. Preston appeared in seven games for the Jazz and 26 for the Stars. In his time with the Salt Lake City Stars of the NBA G League, Preston emerged as a dominant guard. In March 2024 he was named the G League Player of the Week after averaging 23.0 points, 12.0 rebounds and 13.0 assists on 54.0 percent shooting during a 3‑0 week. The following month he earned the Kia NBA G League Player of the Month award for March 2024 after averaging 19.4 points, 11.2 rebounds and 11.8 assists while leading his team on an 11‑game winning streak. He also earned All‑NBA G League First Team honors for the season.

=== San Diego Clippers (2025–2026) ===
On August 12, 2025, Preston signed a training camp deal with the Los Angeles Clippers. However on October 18, Preston was waived by the Clippers.

== Career statistics ==
Legend
GP	Games played	GS	Games started	MPG	Minutes per game
FG%	Field goal percentage	3P%	3-point field goal percentage	FT%	Free throw percentage
RPG	Rebounds per game	APG	Assists per game	SPG	Steals per game
BPG	Blocks per game	PPG	Points per game	**Bold**	Career high

=== NBA ===
==== Regular season ====
Year	Team	GP	GS	MPG	FG%	3P%	FT%	RPG	APG	SPG	BPG	PPG
2022–23	L.A. Clippers	**14**	0	8.8	**.439**	**.278**	.000	1.6	1.9	.1	.0	**2.9**
2023–24	Utah	7	0	**10.2**	.316	.000	—	**2.4**	**2.3**	**.3**	**.1**	1.7
Career		21	0	9.3	.400	.238	.000	1.9	2.0	.2	.0	2.5

==== Playoffs ====
Year	Team	GP	GS	MPG	FG%	3P%	FT%	RPG	APG	SPG	BPG	PPG
2023	L.A. Clippers	1	0	1.0	–	–	–	.0	.0	.0	.0	.0
Career		1	0	1.0	–	–	–	.0	.0	.0	.0	.0

=== College ===
Year	Team	GP	GS	MPG	FG%	3P%	FT%	RPG	APG	SPG	BPG	PPG
2018–19	Ohio	30	21	29.5	.434	.208	**.765**	3.6	3.4	.8	.1	6.0
2019–20	Ohio	**32**	**32**	**38.1**	**.515**	**.407**	.725	6.4	**7.4**	1.4	.1	**16.8**
2020–21	Ohio	20	20	34.6	.514	.390	.596	**7.3**	7.3	**1.5**	**.3**	15.7
Career		82	73	34.1	.498	.357	.703	5.6	5.9	1.2	.1	12.6

== Personal life ==
Preston is a Christian. Preston's mother, Judith Sewell, died of lung cancer when Preston was a junior in high school. His father was absent from his life. After his mother's death, Preston's aunt and uncle, who were living in Jamaica, became his legal guardians, though he remained in the United States and lived with the son of his mother's friend. He grew up watching the Detroit Pistons and has written about the team for online publications.

In April 2023, he was featured as the subject of an AT&T commercial that chronicled some unfortunate events in his early life. He had produced a highlight video that helped earn him a Division I scholarship with Ohio and an eventual pro career.

Preston married college sweetheart Micaylah Nash (now Micaylah Preston) in July 2024 at an intimate destination wedding at Round Hill Hotel and Villas in Montego Bay, Jamaica, attended by 60 guests and covered by The Knot. In lieu of wedding gifts, the couple requested donations to the American Lung Association to honor Preston’s late mother. Preston’s family still resides in Jamaica, as his late mother was born and raised there.

Beyond his on-court career, Preston has established a presence as a basketball educator and content creator. He regularly posts tutorial videos on YouTube and social media platforms, breaking down game film, dribbling techniques, and point-guard decision-making from an NBA-player perspective. His content is designed to give free access to training and insight, particularly to young athletes who may lack resources. In 2025, Preston appeared on the game show Family Feud. He appeared with his wife's family, which included his brother in-law Braylen who played basketball at Ohio State. The family won prize money on the show in the Fast Money round. The team, the Nash family, won the $20,000 on the 2nd day they appeared. The tam also won another $20,000 on their 3rd appearance day. The Nash family hailed from New Albany, Ohio.

== Philanthropy ==
After losing his mother to lung cancer from second-hand smoke, Preston has made it his mission to raise awareness about lung cancer and early detection. He serves as an ambassador for the American Lung Association.

Since 2022, Preston has partnered with his alma mater, Ohio University, annually for Lung Cancer Awareness Month. He has provided white shoes for the basketball team, the color representing lung cancer awareness, shared custom T-shirts featuring his mother’s name, and helped produce public service announcements (PSAs) to educate about lung cancer prevention and early detection.

In 2022, while with the Los Angeles Clippers, he honored his late mother by wearing specially designed “KD Aunt Pearl” shoes in all games and practices.

In 2023, he joined the American Lung Association’s Ambassador Council to further advocate for lung health and honor his mother’s memory.

Preston and his wife also requested donations to the American Lung Association in lieu of wedding gifts, aligning his personal milestone with his philanthropic mission.
