= Rob Murphy (basketball) =

American basketball coach (born 1973)

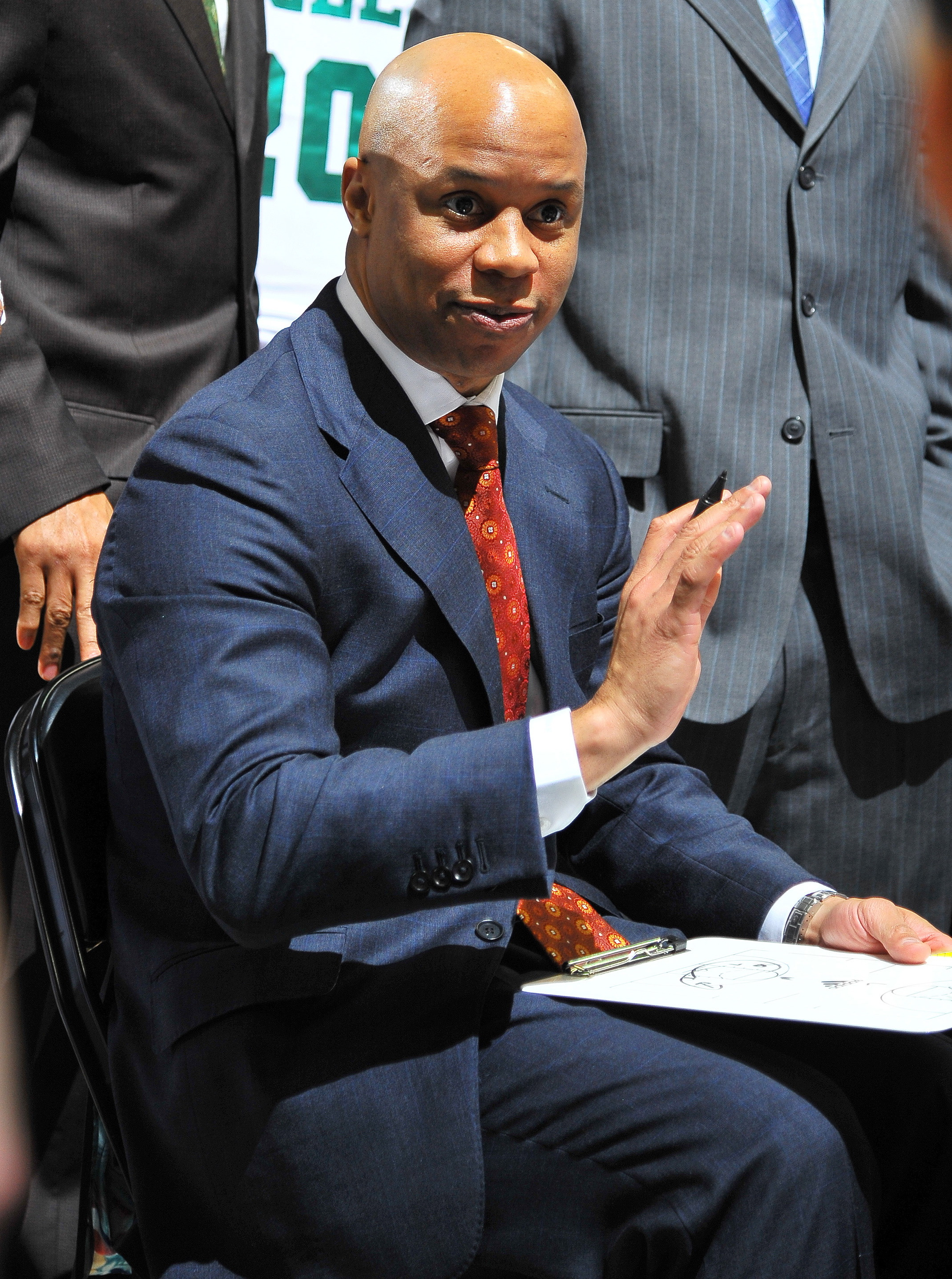
- Murphy coaching at a game in 2012

Biographical details
- Born: September 19, 1973 (age 53); Detroit, Michigan, U.S.

Playing career
- 1992–1996: Central State

Coaching career (HC unless noted)
- 1996–1998: Detroit Central HS (associate)
- 1998–2002: Crockett Technical HS
- 2002–2004: Kent State (assistant)
- 2004–2011: Syracuse (assistant)
- 2011–2021: Eastern Michigan

Head coaching record
- Overall: 166–155 (college); 64–20 (high school)
- Tournaments: 2–1 (CIT); 0–1 (CBI)

Accomplishments and honors

Championships
- MAC West Division (2012)

Awards
- MAC Coach of the Year (2012)

Robert Lewis Murphy Sr. (born September 19, 1973) is an American former basketball executive, coach and player. He was most recently employed as the assistant general manager of the Detroit Pistons of the National Basketball Association (NBA) and the president and general manager of the Motor City Cruise of the NBA G League, the affiliate of the Pistons. He previously served as the head men's basketball coach for the Eastern Michigan Eagles from 2011 to 2021.

== College ==
Rob Murphy attended and played for Central State University basketball program in Wilberforce, Ohio, from 1992 to 1996. Murphy was a two-time team captain during his junior and senior campaigns. Murphy was also named the Marauders' Defensive Player of the Year as a senior while playing for former NBA point guard, Kevin Porter. Murphy was inducted into the CSU Hall of Fame March 1, 2022.

== High school coaching career ==
After graduating from Central State, Murphy was hired as an associate head coach at Central High School in Detroit from 1996 to 1998. After the team reached the state finals in his first year, Detroit Central won a Class A state title in 1998.

Murphy was then hired as head coach at Crockett Technical High School in Detroit. Among his players was Maurice Ager, who was the first-round draft choice of the Dallas Mavericks. Murphy had an overall record of 64–20 at Crockett Technical and was named Detroit Free Press All-Metro Coach of the Year after his club won the Class B state championship in 2001.

== College coaching career ==
=== Kent State ===
Murphy joined Kent State in 2002 as an assistant coach. The Golden Flashes were 21–10 overall and 12–6 in the Mid-American Conference in 2002–03. Kent State reached the final of the MAC Tournament Championship and earned an invitation to the National Invitation Tournament. During this time, Murphy served as a mentor of Antonio Gates, whom he previously coached at Detroit Central High School.

=== Syracuse ===
Following the 2004 season, when Syracuse Orange assistant coach Troy Weaver left for a coaching position with the Utah Jazz, Murphy was hired by the Orange. Murphy was known for developing versatile forward position players with the Orange. Some of the players he tutored include Hakim Warrick, Terrence Roberts, Donte Greene, Wesley Johnson, Kris Joseph, Fab Melo, Arinze Onuaku, CJ Fair, Dion Waiters, Michael Carter-Williams, Rakeem Christmas and James Southerland.

=== Eastern Michigan ===
In his debut season (2011) with Eastern Michigan, Rob Murphy guided the Eagles to a first ever MAC-West championship along with being named 2012 MAC coach of the year. During the 2013–14 season, Murphy guided Eastern to its first 20-win season since 1997–98 (18 years), while also sending the Eagles to their first postseason tournament (the CollegeInsider.com Tournament) since '97–98. Rob Murphy was named a Ben Jobe Award Finalist for the 2013/14 season. Murphy guided his EMU Eagles to a win over Big 10 foe Michigan on December 9, 2014, and holds a victory over Purdue the previous season.

== Motor City Cruise ==
On March 17, 2021, the Motor City Cruise announced the hiring of Murphy as president and general manager.

== Detroit Pistons ==
In 2021, the Detroit Pistons hired Murphy as senior director of player personnel.

On June 1, 2022, the Pistons announced the promotion of Murphy becoming assistant general manager.

On October 20, 2022, it was reported that Murphy was placed on leave after the Pistons organization began investigating an allegation of workplace misconduct involving a former female employee. On May 3, 2023, Murphy was fired by the Pistons for "violation of company policy and the terms of his employment agreement" after DeJanai Raska, Murphy's former executive assistant, announced that she was suing the Pistons and Murphy for sexual harassment and discrimination. Raska accused Murphy of grabbing her buttocks and trying to force her to have sex. Murphy denied the allegations through his attorney. On January 26, 2024, it was reported that the Pistons and Murphy were formally sued by Raska. On April 30, 2024, it was reported that the Pistons and Murphy reached a confidential settlement with Raska.

== Head coaching record ==
=== College ===
Record table
Season	Team	Overall	Conference	Standing	Postseason
Eastern Michigan Eagles (Mid-American Conference) (2011–2021)
2011–12	Eastern Michigan	14–18	9–7	1st (West)	
2012–13	Eastern Michigan	16–18	7–9	4th (West)	
2013–14	Eastern Michigan	22–15	10–8	3rd (West)	CIT Second Round
2014–15	Eastern Michigan	21–14	8–10	T–4th (West)	CBI First Round
2015–16	Eastern Michigan	18–15	9–9	T–3rd (West)	
2016–17	Eastern Michigan	16–17	7–11	4th (West)	
2017–18	Eastern Michigan	22–13	11–7	2nd (West)	CIT Second Round
2018–19	Eastern Michigan	15–17	9–9	3rd (West)	
2019–20	Eastern Michigan	16–16	6-12	5th (West)	
2020–21	Eastern Michigan	6–12	3–11	9th	
Eastern Michigan:		166–155 (.517)	79–93 (.459)		
Total:		166–155 (.517)			
National champion Postseason invitational champion Conference regular season champion Conference regular season and conference tournament champion Division regular season champion Division regular season and conference tournament champion Conference tournament champion
