= 2020–21 Northern Illinois Huskies men's basketball team =

American college basketball season

2020–21 Northern Illinois Huskies men's basketball
- Conference: Mid-American Conference
- Record: 3–16 (2–12 MAC)
- Head coach: Mark Montgomery (10th season) (interim, 1st season); Lamar Chapman
- Assistant coaches: Anthony Beane Sr.; Chris MacMartin
- Home arena: Convocation Center

2020–21 Mid-American Conference men's basketball standings
| | Conf. | | | | Overall |
| Team | W | | L | PCT | W | | L | PCT |
|---|---|---|---|---|---|---|---|---|
| Toledo | 15 | – | 4 | .789 | 21 | – | 9 | .700 |
| Buffalo | 12 | – | 5 | .706 | 16 | – | 9 | .640 |
| Akron | 12 | – | 6 | .667 | 15 | – | 8 | .652 |
| Kent State | 12 | – | 6 | .667 | 15 | – | 8 | .652 |
| Ohio † | 9 | – | 5 | .643 | 17 | – | 8 | .680 |
| Bowling Green | 10 | – | 8 | .556 | 14 | – | 12 | .538 |
| Miami (OH) | 9 | – | 8 | .529 | 12 | – | 11 | .522 |
| Ball State | 8 | – | 9 | .471 | 10 | – | 13 | .435 |
| Western Michigan | 4 | – | 12 | .250 | 5 | – | 16 | .238 |
| Eastern Michigan | 3 | – | 11 | .214 | 6 | – | 12 | .333 |
| Central Michigan | 3 | – | 13 | .188 | 7 | – | 16 | .304 |
| Northern Illinois | 2 | – | 12 | .143 | 3 | – | 16 | .158 |
† 2021 MAC tournament winner

The 2020–21 Northern Illinois Huskies men's basketball team represented Northern Illinois University in the 2020–21 NCAA Division I men's basketball season. The Huskies, led by interim head coach Lamar Chapman, played their home games at the Convocation Center in DeKalb, Illinois as members of the Mid-American Conference. In a season limited due to the ongoing COVID-19 pandemic, the Huskies finished the season 3–16, 2–12 in MAC play to finish in last place. They failed to qualify for the MAC tournament which had been limited to provide that the bottom four finishers would not be eligible. The MAC also announced the removal of divisions in cost-cutting measure partly attributed to COVID-19.

On January 3, 2021, it was announced that head coach Mark Montgomery had been relieved of his duties after the team's 1–7 start to the season. Associate head coach Lamar Chapman was named interim head coach for the remainder of the season.

== Previous season ==
The Huskies finished the 2019–20 season 18–13, 11–7, to finish in a tie for first place in the MAC West division. They were scheduled to play Miami (OH) in the quarterfinals of the MAC tournament, but the remainder of the tournament was cancelled amid the COVID-19 pandemic.

== Roster ==
2020–21 Northern Illinois Huskies men's basketball team
Players
Coaches

| Pos. | # | Name | Height | Weight | Year | Previous school | Hometown |
|---|---|---|---|---|---|---|---|
| F | 0 | Chris Johnson | 6 ft 7 in (2.01 m) | 215 lb (98 kg) | Sr | South Suburban College | Chicago, IL |
| G | 1 | Trendon Hankerson | 6 ft 2 in (1.88 m) | 185 lb (84 kg) | Jr | Novi HS | Novi, MI |
| G | 2 | Kaleb Thornton | 6 ft 0 in (1.83 m) | 170 lb (77 kg) | So | Iowa Western CC | Bolingbrook, IL |
| G/F | 3 | Justin Lee | 6 ft 8 in (2.03 m) | 210 lb (95 kg) | Jr | Collins Hill HS | Lawrenceville, GA |
| G | 4 | Tavon Jones | 6 ft 3 in (1.91 m) | 180 lb (82 kg) | Jr | Odessa College | Linden, NJ |
| G | 5 | Zaire Mateen | 6 ft 0 in (1.83 m) | 170 lb (77 kg) | Sr | Laramie County CC | Queens, NY |
| F | 11 | Chinedu Kingsley Okanu | 6 ft 7 in (2.01 m) | 225 lb (102 kg) | Jr | Vincennes | Gary, IN |
| F | 12 | Zool Kueth | 6 ft 7 in (2.01 m) | 200 lb (91 kg) | Jr | Pratt CC | Gallatin, TN |
| C | 13 | Adong Makuoi | 6 ft 9 in (2.06 m) | 220 lb (100 kg) | Jr | Daytona State College | Edmonton, Alberta, Canada |
| G | 20 | Daniel Filippone | 6 ft 1 in (1.85 m) | 175 lb (79 kg) | So | Antioch Community HS | Antioch, IL |
| G | 23 | Tyler Cochran | 6 ft 2 in (1.88 m) | 220 lb (100 kg) | So | Bolingbrook HS | Bolingbrook, IL |
| G | 24 | Darius Beane | 6 ft 3 in (1.91 m) | 175 lb (79 kg) | Jr | Southern Illinois | Carbondale, IL |
| F | 25 | Nathan Scott | 6 ft 8 in (2.03 m) | 195 lb (88 kg) | Sr | Olney Central College | Naperville, IL |
| F | 32 | Keenon Cole | 6 ft 7 in (2.01 m) | 200 lb (91 kg) | So | Streamwood HS | Streamwood, IL |
| G | 50 | Anthony Crump | 6 ft 8 in (2.03 m) | 200 lb (91 kg) | Jr | Middle Tennessee | Inkster, MI |

Head coach

- Lamar Chapman (Lane College)

Assistant coach(es)

- Anthony Beane Sr. (Kansas State)
- Chris MacMartin (Northern Illinois)

Legend

- (C) Team captain
- (S) Suspended
- (I) Ineligible
- (W) Walk-on
- Injured
- Current redshirt

Roster
Last update: January 16, 2021

== Schedule and results ==
| Date time, TV | Rank^{#} | Opponent^{#} | Result | Record | Site (attendance) city, state |
Regular season
| November 25, 2020*; 6:00 pm | | UIC | L 61–65 | 0–1 | Convocation Center; DeKalb, IL |
| December 2, 2020*; 6:00 pm, ESPN3 | | SIU Edwardsville | L 53–73 | 0–2 | Convocation Center; DeKalb, IL |
| December 5, 2020*; 6:00 pm, ACCNX | | at Pittsburgh | L 59–89 | 0–3 | Petersen Events Center (500); Pittsburgh, PA |
| December 8, 2020; 6:00 pm, ESPN3 | | Ball State | L 70–79 ^{OT} | 0–4 (0–1) | Convocation Center; DeKalb, IL |
| December 13, 2020*; 1:00 pm, FS1 | | at No. 3 Iowa | L 53–106 | 0–5 | Carver–Hawkeye Arena (546); Iowa City, IA |
| December 18, 2020*; 6:00 pm, ESPN3 | | Chicago State | W 64–54 | 1–5 | Convocation Center; DeKalb, IL |
| December 22, 2020; 1:00 pm, ESPN3 | | at Toledo | L 55–78 | 1–6 (0–2) | Savage Arena; Toledo, OH |
| January 2, 2021; 5:00 pm, ESPN3 | | Bowling Green | L 42–68 | 1–7 (0–3) | Convocation Center; DeKalb, IL |
| January 5, 2021; 5:00 pm, ESPN+ | | at Ohio | L 73–76 | 1–8 (0–4) | Convocation Center; Athens, OH |
| January 9, 2021; 12:00 pm, ESPN+ | | at Miami (OH) | L 58–70 | 1–9 (0–5) | Millett Hall; Oxford, OH |
| January 12, 2021; 2:00 pm, ESPN+ | | Akron | W 67–65 | 2–9 (1–5) | Convocation Center; DeKalb, IL |
| January 16, 2021; 12:00 pm, ESPN+ | | at Ball State | L 58–78 | 2–10 (1–6) | Worthen Arena (132); Muncie, IN |
| January 19, 2021; 6:00 pm, ESPN+ | | Ohio | Postponed | | Convocation Center; DeKalb, IL |
| January 23, 2021; 5:00 pm, ESPN3 | | Buffalo | Postponed | | Convocation Center; DeKalb, IL |
| January 26, 2021; 6:00 pm, ESPN+ | | at Bowling Green | Postponed | | Stroh Center; Bowling Green, OH |
| January 30, 2021; 5:00 pm, ESPN3 | | Eastern Michigan | Postponed | | Convocation Center; DeKalb, IL |
| February 2, 2021; 6:00 pm, ESPN3 | | at Western Michigan | Postponed | | University Arena; Kalamazoo, MI |
| February 6, 2021; 1:30 pm, ESPN3 | | Central Michigan | Postponed | | Convocation Center; DeKalb, IL |
| February 9, 2021; 2:00 pm, ESPN+ | | Toledo | Postponed | | Convocation Center; DeKalb, IL |
| February 13, 2021; 1:00 pm, ESPN3 | | at Kent State | L 58–80 | 2–11 (1–7) | MAC Center; Kent, OH |
| February 16, 2021; 1:00 pm, ESPN3 | | at Akron | L 76–81 | 2–12 (1–8) | James A. Rhodes Arena (52); Akron, OH |
| February 20, 2021; 5:00 pm, ESPN3 | | Miami (OH) | L 64–69 | 2–13 (1–9) | Convocation Center (23); DeKalb, IL |
| February 23, 2021; 5:00 pm, ESPN3 | | Buffalo | L 74–102 | 2–14 (1–10) | Convocation Center (27); DeKalb, IL |
| February 27, 2021; 12:00 pm, ESPN3 | | at Eastern Michigan | L 57–91 | 2–15 (1–11) | Convocation Center (75); Ypsilanti, MI |
| March 2, 2021; 6:00 pm, ESPN+ | | Western Michigan | L 63–73 | 2–16 (1–12) | Convocation Center (24); DeKalb, IL |
| March 5, 2021; 4:00 pm, ESPN3 | | at Central Michigan | W 79–74 | 3–16 (2–12) | McGuirk Arena; Mount Pleasant, MI |
*Non-conference game. ^{#}Rankings from AP Poll. (#) Tournament seedings in parentheses. All times are in Eastern.
