= 2020–21 Ball State Cardinals men's basketball team =

American college basketball season

2020–21 Ball State Cardinals men's basketball
- Conference: Mid-American Conference
- Record: 10–13 (8–9 MAC)
- Head coach: James Whitford (8th season)
- Associate head coach: Jason Grunkemeyer
- Assistant coaches: Ben Botts; Matt Crenshaw
- Home arena: Worthen Arena

2020–21 Mid-American Conference men's basketball standings
| | Conf. | | | | Overall |
| Team | W | | L | PCT | W | | L | PCT |
|---|---|---|---|---|---|---|---|---|
| Toledo | 15 | – | 4 | .789 | 21 | – | 9 | .700 |
| Buffalo | 12 | – | 5 | .706 | 16 | – | 9 | .640 |
| Akron | 12 | – | 6 | .667 | 15 | – | 8 | .652 |
| Kent State | 12 | – | 6 | .667 | 15 | – | 8 | .652 |
| Ohio † | 9 | – | 5 | .643 | 17 | – | 8 | .680 |
| Bowling Green | 10 | – | 8 | .556 | 14 | – | 12 | .538 |
| Miami (OH) | 9 | – | 8 | .529 | 12 | – | 11 | .522 |
| Ball State | 8 | – | 9 | .471 | 10 | – | 13 | .435 |
| Western Michigan | 4 | – | 12 | .250 | 5 | – | 16 | .238 |
| Eastern Michigan | 3 | – | 11 | .214 | 6 | – | 12 | .333 |
| Central Michigan | 3 | – | 13 | .188 | 7 | – | 16 | .304 |
| Northern Illinois | 2 | – | 12 | .143 | 3 | – | 16 | .158 |
† 2021 MAC tournament winner

The 2020–21 Ball State Cardinals men's basketball team represented Ball State University in the 2020–21 NCAA Division I men's basketball season. The Cardinals, led by eighth-year head coach James Whitford, played their home games at Worthen Arena as members of the Mid-American Conference. Starting this season, the MAC announced the removal of divisions.

== Previous season ==
The Cardinals finished the 2019–20 season 18–13, 11–7, to finish in a tie for first place in the MAC West division. They were scheduled to play Kent State in the quarterfinals of the MAC tournament, but the remainder of the tournament was cancelled amid the COVID-19 pandemic.

== Roster ==
2020–21 Ball State Cardinals men's basketball team
Players
Coaches

| Pos. | # | Name | Height | Weight | Year | Previous school | Hometown |
|---|---|---|---|---|---|---|---|
| F | 0 | Miryne Thomas | 6 ft 8 in (2.03 m) | 200 lb (91 kg) | RS Jr | Maryland Eastern Shore | Cleveland, Ohio |
| G | 1 | K.J. Walton | 6 ft 3 in (1.91 m) | 200 lb (91 kg) | RS Sr | Missouri | Indianapolis, Indiana |
| G | 2 | Luke Bumbalough | 6 ft 1 in (1.85 m) | 180 lb (82 kg) | So | New Castle High School | New Castle, Indiana |
| G | 3 | Teemu Suokas | 6 ft 2 in (1.88 m) | 185 lb (84 kg) | Fr | Helsinki Basketball Academy | Helsinki, Finland |
| G | 4 | Josh Bryan | 6 ft 5 in (1.96 m) | 185 lb (84 kg) | Fr | UIndy | Muncie, Indiana |
| G | 5 | Ishmael El-Amin | 6 ft 3 in (1.91 m) | 180 lb (82 kg) | Sr | Hopkins High School | Minneapolis, Minnesota |
| G | 11 | Jarron Coleman | 6 ft 5 in (1.96 m) | 205 lb (93 kg) | RS So | Cathedral High School | Indianapolis, Indiana |
| F | 12 | Brachen Hazen | 6 ft 8 in (2.03 m) | 210 lb (95 kg) | RS Sr | Arkansas | Columbia City, Indiana |
| G | 13 | Kani Acree | 6 ft 6 in (1.98 m) | 185 lb (84 kg) | RS So | Carbondale Community High School | Carbondale, Illinois |
| F | 15 | Zach Gunn | 6 ft 6 in (1.98 m) | 210 lb (95 kg) | RS Jr | Hamilton Southeastern High School | Fishers, Indiana |
| G/F | 23 | Reggie Jones | 6 ft 7 in (2.01 m) | 210 lb (95 kg) | RS Sr | Tulsa | Marion, Indiana |
| G | 24 | Jalen Windham | 6 ft 5 in (1.96 m) | 180 lb (82 kg) | So | Creighton | Indianapolis, Indiana |
| G | 25 | Chris Robinson | 6 ft 2 in (1.88 m) | 185 lb (84 kg) | So | IU–Northwest | Indianapolis, Indiana |
| C | 34 | Ben Hendriks | 6 ft 10 in (2.08 m) | 215 lb (98 kg) | So | Orangeville Prep | Mississauga, Ontario |
| C | 44 | Blake Huggins | 6 ft 10 in (2.08 m) | 245 lb (111 kg) | RS Jr | Obion County Central High School | Union City, Tennessee |

Head coach

- James Whitford (Wisconsin)

Assistant coach(es)

- Jason Grunkemeyer (Miami (OH))
- Ben Botts (Purdue Fort Wayne)
- Matt Crenshaw (IUPUI)

Legend

- (C) Team captain
- (S) Suspended
- (I) Ineligible
- (W) Walk-on
- Injured
- Current redshirt

Roster
Last update: December 29, 2020

== Schedule and results ==
| Date time, TV | Rank^{#} | Opponent^{#} | Result | Record | Site (attendance) city, state |
Regular season
| November 25, 2020*; 6:00 pm, ESPN3 | | at Northern Kentucky | L 73–74 | 0–1 | BB&T Arena; Highland Heights, KY |
| December 2, 2020*; 7:00 pm, BTN | | at Michigan | L 65–84 | 0–2 | Crisler Center; Ann Arbor, MI |
| December 5, 2020*; 2:00 pm, ESPN3 | | UIC | W 68–66 | 1–2 | Worthen Arena (96); Muncie, IN |
| December 12, 2020; 7:00 pm, ESPN3 | | at Northern Illinois | W 79–70 ^{OT} | 2–2 (1–0) | Convocation Center; DeKalb, IL |
| December 12, 2020*; 7:00 pm, ESPN3 | | Illinois State | W 82–66 | 3–2 | Worthen Arena (107); Muncie, IN |
| December 19, 2020*; 1:00 pm, ESPN3 | | at Indiana State | L 57–67 | 3–3 | Hulman Center (100); Terre Haute, IN |
| December 22, 2020; 2:00 pm, ESPN3 | | at Western Michigan | W 76–68 | 4–3 (2–0) | University Arena; Kalamazoo, MI |
| January 2, 2021; 3:00 pm, CBSSN | | Ohio | L 68–78 | 4–4 (2–1) | Worthen Arena (75); Muncie, IN |
| January 5, 2021 | | Western Michigan | Postponed | | Worthen Arena; Muncie, IN |
| January 9, 2021; 5:00 pm | | at Buffalo | L 69–86 | 4–5 (2–2) | Alumni Arena; Amherst, NY |
| January 12, 2020; 7:00 pm, ESPN+ | | at Bowling Green | W 88–64 | 5–5 (3–2) | Stroh Center; Bowling Green, OH |
| January 16, 2021; 1:00 pm, ESPN+ | | Northern Illinois | W 78–58 | 6–5 (4–2) | Worthen Arena (132); Muncie, IN |
| January 19, 2021; 7:00 pm | | at Miami (OH) | L 71–81 | 6–6 (4–3) | Millett Hall; Oxford, OH |
| January 23, 2021; 1:30 pm | | at Ohio | L 77–85 | 6–7 (4–4) | Convocation Center; Athens, OH |
| January 26, 2021; 7:00 pm | | Kent State | Postponed | | Worthen Arena; Muncie, IN |
| January 30, 2021; 2:00 pm, ESPN3 | | at Akron | L 42–74 | 6–8 (4–5) | James A. Rhodes Arena (25); Akron, OH |
| February 2, 2021; 6:00 pm, ESPN+ | | Buffalo | L 58–78 | 6–9 (4–6) | Worthen Arena (235); Muncie, IN |
| February 6, 2021; 12:00 pm, CBSSN | | Toledo | W 81–67 | 7–9 (5–6) | Worthen Arena (195); Muncie, IN |
| February 9, 2021; 5:00 pm, ESPN3 | | at Central Michigan | Postponed | | McGuirk Arena; Mount Pleasant, MI |
| February 13, 2021; 1:00 pm | | at Eastern Michigan | Postponed | | Convocation Center; Ypsilanti, MI |
| February 16, 2021; 7:00 pm | | Bowling Green | L 62–75 | 7–10 (5–7) | Worthen Arena; Muncie, IN |
| February 19, 2021; 7:00 pm, CBSSN | | Akron | L 79–88 | 7–11 (5–8) | Worthen Arena (90); Muncie, IN |
| February 21, 2021; 7:00 pm, ESPN+ | | Western Michigan | Postponed | | Worthen Arena; Muncie, IN |
| February 24, 2021; 2:00 pm | | Kent State | W 90–71 | 8–11 (6–8) | Worthen Arena (109); Muncie, IN |
| February 27, 2021; 1:00 pm | | Central Michigan | W 97–91 | 9–11 (7–8) | Worthen Arena (150); Muncie, IN |
| March 2, 2021; 7:00 pm | | at Eastern Michigan | W 100–65 | 10–11 (8–8) | Convocation Center (92); Ypsilanti, MI |
| March 5, 2021; 7:00 pm, CBSSN | | at Toledo | L 70–89 | 10–12 (8–9) | Savage Arena; Toledo, OH |
MAC tournament
| March 11, 2021; 11:00 am, ESPN+ | (8) | vs. (1) Toledo; Quarterfinals | L 89–91 ^{OT} | 10–13 | Rocket Mortgage FieldHouse; Cleveland, OH |
*Non-conference game. ^{#}Rankings from AP Poll. (#) Tournament seedings in parentheses. All times are in Eastern.
