= 2019–20 Toledo Rockets men's basketball team =

American college basketball season

2019–20 Toledo Rockets men's basketball
- Conference: Mid-American Conference
- West Division
- Record: 17–15 (8–10 MAC)
- Head coach: Tod Kowalczyk (10th season)
- Assistant coaches: Jeff Massey; Walter Offutt; Justin Ingram
- Home arena: Savage Arena

2019–20 Mid-American Conference men's basketball standings
	Conf.				Overall
Team	W		L	PCT	W		L	PCT
East
Akron	14	–	4	.778	24	–	7	.774
Bowling Green	12	–	6	.667	21	–	10	.677
Buffalo	11	–	7	.611	20	–	12	.625
Kent State	9	–	9	.500	20	–	12	.625
Ohio	8	–	10	.444	17	–	15	.531
Miami (OH)	5	–	13	.278	13	–	19	.406
West
Ball State	11	–	7	.611	18	–	13	.581
Northern Illinois	11	–	7	.611	18	–	13	.581
Toledo	8	–	10	.444	17	–	15	.531
Central Michigan	7	–	11	.389	14	–	18	.438
Western Michigan	6	–	12	.333	13	–	19	.406
Eastern Michigan	6	–	12	.333	16	–	16	.500
Note: The 2020 MAC tournament was canceled prior to the quarterfinals due to the COVID-19 pandemic.

The 2019–20 Toledo Rockets men's basketball team represented the University of Toledo during the 2019–20 NCAA Division I men's basketball season. The Rockets, led by tenth-year head coach Tod Kowalczyk, played their home games at Savage Arena, as members of the West Division of the Mid-American Conference.

== Previous season ==
The Rockets finished the 2018–19 season 25–8, 13–5 in MAC play to win the MAC West division championship. As the No. 2 seed in the MAC tournament, they lost to Northern Illinois in the quarterfinals round. They received an invitation to the National Invitation Tournament, where they lost in the first round to Xavier.

== Offseason ==
=== Departures ===
Name	Number	Pos.	Height	Weight	Year	Hometown	Reason for departure
James Gordon IV	0	F	6'5"	225	Sophomore	Shelbyville, KY	Graduate transferred to Wayne State University
Jaelan Sanford	13	G	6'4"	200	Senior	Evansville, IN	Graduated
Matt Schaffer	4	G	6'1"	185	Junior	Sylvania, OH	
Nate Navigato	35	F	6'8"	170	Senior	Lawrence, KS	Graduated
Chris Darington	32	G	6'1"	185	Senior	Toledo, OH	Graduated
Logan Hill	41	F	6'7"	215	Redshirt freshman	Massillion, OH	Transferred to the University of Mount Union

=== Incoming transfers ===
Name	Number	Pos.	Height	Weight	Year	Hometown	Previous school
Gavin Bizeau	14	F	6’11”	210	Freshman	Plainfield, IN	Transferred from Duquesne University

=== Recruiting class of 2019 ===
College recruiting (2019)
Name	Hometown	School	Height	Weight	Commit date
Luke Maranka; PF	Ada, MI	Grand Rapids Angels Homeschool	6 ft 11 in (2.11 m)	215 lb (98 kg)	Sep 19, 2018
Luke Maranka; PF	Recruit ratings: Scout: Rivals: (NR)				
Donavan Moore; SG	West Bloomfield, MI	West Bloomfield High School	6 ft 3 in (1.91 m)	N/A	Jul 17, 2017
Donavan Moore; SG	Recruit ratings: Scout: Rivals: (NR)				
Aaron Etherington; SF	Fishers, IN	Hamilton Southeastern High School	6 ft 5 in (1.96 m)	190 lb (86 kg)	Jul 2, 2018
Aaron Etherington; SF	Recruit ratings: Scout: Rivals: 247Sports: (NR)				
Mattia Acunzo; SF	Sardinia, Italy	Kennedy Catholic High School	6 ft 8 in (2.03 m)	200 lb (91 kg)	Oct 13, 2018
Mattia Acunzo; SF	Recruit ratings: Scout: Rivals: 247Sports: (NR)				
Overall recruit ranking:
Note: In many cases, Scout, Rivals, 247Sports, On3, and ESPN may conflict in their listings of height and weight.; In these cases, the average was taken. ESPN grades are on a 100-point scale.; Sources: "2019 Team Ranking". Rivals.

== Roster ==
2019–20 Toledo Rockets men's basketball team
Players
Coaches

Pos.	#	Name	Height	Weight	Year	Previous school	Hometown
F	0	Gavin Bizeau	6 ft 11 in (2.11 m)	210 lb (95 kg)	So	Plainfield; Duquesne	Plainfield, IN
F	1	T. J. Smith	6 ft 8 in (2.03 m)	195 lb (88 kg)	RS Fr	Aspire Academy	Matteson, IL
F	2	Aaron Etherington	6 ft 6 in (1.98 m)	215 lb (98 kg)	Fr	Hamilton Southeastern	Fishers, IN
G	3	Marreon Jackson	6 ft 0 in (1.83 m)	175 lb (79 kg)	Jr	Garfield Heights	Cleveland, OH
G	4	Mattia Acunzo	6 ft 7 in (2.01 m)	235 lb (107 kg)	Fr	Kennedy Catholic	Sardinia, Italy
G	5	Donavan Moore	6 ft 3 in (1.91 m)	175 lb (79 kg)	Fr	West Bloomfield	Hillsboro, IL
G	11	Spencer Littleson	6 ft 4 in (1.93 m)	200 lb (91 kg)	Jr	Rochester Adams; Duquesne	Rochester Hills, MI
F	12	Luke Maranka	6 ft 10 in (2.08 m)	205 lb (93 kg)	Fr	Grand Rapids Angels Homeschool	Ada, MI
F	15	A. J. Edu	6 ft 10 in (2.08 m)	215 lb (98 kg)	So	South Gloucestershire and Stroud College	Colchester, England
G	21	Dylan Alderson	6 ft 5 in (1.96 m)	205 lb (93 kg)	Jr	Clarkston	Clarkston, MI
G	22	Blake Williams (W)	6 ft 0 in (1.83 m)	185 lb (84 kg)	Jr	St. John's Jesuit	Holland, OH
F	23	Willie Jackson	6 ft 6 in (1.98 m)	215 lb (98 kg)	Sr	Garfield Heights; Missouri	Cleveland, OH
G	24	Keshaun Saunders	6 ft 5 in (1.96 m)	190 lb (86 kg)	RS Fr	Orangeville Prep	Brampton, ON
C	30	Luke Knapke	6 ft 11 in (2.11 m)	245 lb (111 kg)	Sr	Marion Local	Maria Stein, OH

Head coach

- Tod Kowalczyk (Minnesota Duluth)

Assistant coach(es)

- Jeff Massey (Xavier)
- Walter Offutt (Ohio)
- Justin Ingram (Toledo)

Legend

- (C) Team captain
- (S) Suspended
- (I) Ineligible
- (W) Walk-on
- Injured
- Current redshirt

Roster

== Schedule and results ==
Date time, TV	Rank^{#}	Opponent^{#}	Result	Record	Site (attendance) city, state
Exhibition
Oct 19, 2019*; 7:00 pm		Hillsdale	W 79–63		Savage Arena; Toledo, OH
Oct 27, 2019*; 2:00 pm		Findlay	W 75–68		Croy Gymnasium (767); Findlay, OH
Non-conference regular season
Nov 5, 2019*; 8:00 pm, ESPN3		at Valparaiso	L 77–79	0–1	Athletics–Recreation Center (2,412); Valparaiso, IN
Nov 10, 2019*; 2:00 pm, ESPN3		at Marshall; MABC Invitational	W 96–70	1–1	Cam Henderson Center (5,645); Huntington, WV
Nov 16, 2018*; 2:00 pm, ESPN3		Robert Morris; MABC Invitational	W 70–56	2–1	Savage Arena (4,231); Toledo, OH
Nov 17, 2018*; 2:00 pm, ESPN3		Howard; MABC Invitational	W 112–68	3–1	Savage Arena (4,220); Toledo, OH
Nov 21, 2018*; 8:30 pm, ACCN		at Notre Dame; MABC Invitational	L 62–64 ^{OT}	3–2	Edmund P. Joyce Center (6,555); Notre Dame, IN
Nov 23, 2019*; 2:00 pm, ESPN+		Northwestern Ohio	W 100–41	4–2	Savage Arena (3,717); Toledo, OH
Nov 30, 2019*; 7:00 pm, ESPN+		Oakland	W 65–63	5–2	Savage Arena (3,931); Toledo, OH
Dec 4, 2019*; 7:00 pm, ESPN+		at Cleveland State	W 80–59	6–2	Wolstein Center (1,683); Cleveland, OH
Dec 8, 2019*; 2:00 pm, ESPN+		Marshall	W 82–72	7–2	Savage Arena (3,887); Toledo, OH
Dec 14, 2019*; 3:00 pm, ESPN+		at Detroit Mercy	W 80–72	8–2	Calihan Hall (1,654); Detroit, MI
Dec 17, 2019*; 8:00 pm		at Kansas City	L 57–72	8–3	Swinney Recreation Center (773); Kansas City, MO
Dec 21, 2019*; 2:00 pm, ESPN+		Wright State	L 72–79	8–4	Savage Arena (4,038); Toledo, OH
Dec 28, 2019*; 2:00 pm, ESPN+		at Bradley	L 66–78	8–5	Peoria Civic Center (5,293); Peoria, IL
MAC regular season
Jan 3, 2020; 7:00 pm, CBSSN		at Ball State	L 57–61	0–1	Worthen Arena (8–6); Muncie, IN
Jan 7, 2020; 7:00 pm, ESPN+		at Kent State	L 77–84	8–7 (0–2)	Memorial Athletic and Convocation Center (2,234); Kent, OH
Jan 11, 2020; 7:00 pm, ESPN3		Western Michigan	W 67–59	9–7 (1–2)	Savage Arena (4,371); Toledo, OH
Jan 14, 2020; 7:00 pm, ESPN+		Central Michigan	L 67–74	9–8 (1–3)	Savage Arena (3,341); Toledo, OH
Jan 18, 2019; 2:00 pm, ESPN3		at Akron	W 99–89	10–8 (2–3)	James A. Rhodes Arena (4,386); Akron, OH
Jan 21, 2020; 7:00 pm, ESPN3		at Ohio	W 83–74	11–8 (3–3)	Convocation Center; Athens, OH
Jan 25, 2020; 7:00 pm, ESPN3		Bowling Green	L 79–85	11–9 (3–4)	Savage Arena (7,268); Toledo, OH
Jan 28, 2020; 7:00 pm, ESPN+		Kent State	L 70–83	11–10 (3–5)	Savage Arena (4,033); Toledo, OH
Feb 1, 2020; 2:00 pm, ESPN3		at Eastern Michigan	L 57–61	11–11 (3–6)	Convocation Center (2,382); Ypsilanti, MI
Feb 4, 2019; 7:00 pm, ESPN+		Northern Illinois	L 61–66	11–12 (3–7)	Savage Arena (3,877); Toledo, OH
Feb 8, 2020; 4:30 pm, ESPN3		at Bowling Green	L 83–85	11–13 (3–8)	Stroh Center (5,000); Bowling Green, OH
Feb 11, 2020; 7:00 pm, ESPN+		Miami (OH)	W 65–57	12–13 (4–8)	Savage Arena (3,817); Toledo, OH
Feb 14, 2020; 6:30 pm, CBSSN		Buffalo	L 67–83	12–14 (4–9)	Savage Arena (4,276); Toledo, OH
Feb 22, 2020; 6:00 pm, ESPN3		at Western Michigan	W 68–59	13–14 (5–9)	University Arena (2,264); Kalamazoo, MI
Feb 25, 2020; 7:00 pm, ESPN+		at Central Michigan	W 93–81	14–14 (6–9)	McGuirk Arena (1,840); Mount Pleasant, MI
Feb 29, 2020; 7:00 pm, ESPN3		Ball State	W 69–63	15–14 (7–9)	Savage Arena (5,842); Toledo, OH
Mar 3, 2020; 8:00 pm, ESPN+		at Northern Illinois	L 50–71	15–15 (7–10)	Convocation Center (1,019); Dekalb, IL
Mar 6, 2020; 7:00 pm, ESPN3		Eastern Michigan	W 79–57	16–15 (8–10)	Savage Arena (4,823); Toledo, OH
MAC tournament
Mar 9, 2020; 7:00 pm, ESPN+	(7)	(10) Western Michigan; First round	W 76–73	17–15	Savage Arena (3,286); Toledo, OH
March 12, 2020; 7:00 pm, ESPN+	(7)	vs. (2) Bowling Green; Quarterfinals	MAC Tournament cancelled due to the COVID-19 pandemic		Rocket Mortgage FieldHouse; Cleveland, OH
*Non-conference game. ^{#}Rankings from AP Poll. (#) Tournament seedings in parentheses. All times are in Eastern Time.
