= 2019–20 Mid-American Conference men's basketball season =

- League: NCAA Division I
- Sport: Basketball
- Teams: 12

Regular season
- League champions: Akron
- Runners-up: Bowling Green
- Season MVP: Loren Cristian Jackson

Tournament

Mid-American men's basketball seasons
- ← 2018–19 2020–21 →

2019–20 Mid-American Conference men's basketball standings
	Conf.				Overall
Team	W		L	PCT	W		L	PCT
East
Akron	14	–	4	.778	24	–	7	.774
Bowling Green	12	–	6	.667	21	–	10	.677
Buffalo	11	–	7	.611	20	–	12	.625
Kent State	9	–	9	.500	20	–	12	.625
Ohio	8	–	10	.444	17	–	15	.531
Miami (OH)	5	–	13	.278	13	–	19	.406
West
Ball State	11	–	7	.611	18	–	13	.581
Northern Illinois	11	–	7	.611	18	–	13	.581
Toledo	8	–	10	.444	17	–	15	.531
Central Michigan	7	–	11	.389	14	–	18	.438
Western Michigan	6	–	12	.333	13	–	19	.406
Eastern Michigan	6	–	12	.333	16	–	16	.500
Note: The 2020 MAC tournament was canceled prior to the quarterfinals due to the COVID-19 pandemic.

The 2019–20 Mid-American Conference men's basketball season began with practices in October 2019, followed by the start of the 2019–20 NCAA Division I men's basketball season in November. Conference play began in January 2020 and concluded in March 2020. Akron won the regular season championship with a record of 14–4. Akron's Loren Cristian Jackson was named player of the year. The MAC tournament was cancelled due to the start of the COVID-19 pandemic. The NCAA tournament and all of the national postseason tournaments were cancelled.

== Preseason awards ==
The preseason coaches' poll and league awards were announced by the league office on October 31, 2019.

=== Preseason men's basketball coaches poll ===
(First place votes in parentheses)

==== East Division ====
1. Bowling Green 69 (9)
2. Buffalo 58 (3)
3. Kent State 43
4. Miami 37
5. Akron 33
6. Ohio 12

==== West Division ====
1. Toledo 69 (11)
2. Northern Illinois 52
3. Ball State 51 (1)
4. Central Michigan 41
5. Western Michigan 23
6. Eastern Michigan 16

==== Tournament champs ====
1. Bowling Green (6)
2. Toledo (2)
3. Buffalo (1)
4. Kent State (1)
5. Miami (1)
6. NIU (1)

=== Honors ===
Honor	Recipient
Preseason All-MAC East	Justin Turner, Bowling Green
Preseason All-MAC East	Dylan Frye, Bowling Green
Preseason All-MAC East	Phillip Whittington, Kent State
Preseason All-MAC East	Nike Sibande, Miami
Preseason All-MAC East	Jayvon Graves, Buffalo, Akron
Preseason All-MAC West	Eugene German, Northern Illinois
Preseason All-MAC West	Tahjai Teague, Ball State
Preseason All-MAC West	Marreon Jackson, Toledo
Preseason All-MAC West	Luke Knapke, Toledo
Preseason All-MAC West	Michael Flowers, Western Michigan
Preseason All-MAC West	Dave DiLeo, Central Michigan

== Postseason ==
=== Postseason awards ===
1. Coach of the Year: John Groce, Akron
2. Player of the Year: Loren Cristian Jackson, R-Jr., G, Akron
3. Freshman of the Year: Jarron Coleman, G, Ball State
4. Defensive Player of the Year: Davonta Jordan, Sr., G, Buffalo
5. Sixth Man of the Year: Ronaldo Segu, So., G, Buffalo

=== Honors ===
Honor	Recipient
All-MAC First Team	Loren Cristian Jackson, R-Jr., G, Akron
All-MAC First Team	Eugene German, Sr., G, Northern Illinois
All-MAC First Team	Jayvon Graves, Jr., G, Buffalo
All-MAC First Team	Tahjai Teague, R-Sr., F, Ball State
All-MAC First Team	Justin Turner, R-Jr., G, Bowling Green
All-MAC Second Team	Tyler Cheese, Sr., G, Akron
All-MAC Second Team	Marreon Jackson, Jr., G, Toledo
All-MAC Second Team	Daeqwon Plowden, Jr., F, Bowling Green
All-MAC Second Team	Jason Preston, So., G, Ohio
All-MAC Second Team	Antonio Williams, Sr., G, Kent State
All-MAC Third Team	Ishmael El-Amin, Jr., G, Ball State
All-MAC Third Team	Brandon Johnson, R-Jr., F, Western Michigan
All-MAC Third Team	Luke Knapke, Sr., C, Toledo
All-MAC Third Team	Ben Vander Plas, R-So., F, Ohio
All-MAC Third Team	Xeyrius Williams, Sr., F, Akron
All-MAC Honorable Mention	David DiLeo, Sr., F, Central Michigan
All-MAC Honorable Mention	Michael Flowers, Jr. G, Western Michigan
All-MAC Honorable Mention	Willie Jackson, Sr., F, Toledo
All-MAC Honorable Mention	Danny Pippen, Jr., F, Kent State
All-MAC Honorable Mention	Boubacar Toure, R-Sr., C, Eastern Michigan
All-MAC Freshman Team	Jarron Coleman, G, Ball State
All-MAC Freshman Team	Dae Dae Grant, G, Miami
All-MAC Freshman Team	Lunden McDay, G, Ohio
All-MAC Freshman Team	Keshaun Saunders, G, Toledo
All-MAC Freshman Team	Titus Wright, C/F, Western Michigan
All-MAC Defensive Team	Channel Banks, Sr., G, Akron
All-MAC Defensive Team	Davonta Jordan, Sr., G, Buffalo
All-MAC Defensive Team	Tahjai Teague, R-Sr., F, Ball State
All-MAC Defensive Team	Boubacar Toure, R-Sr., C, Eastern Michigan
All-MAC Defensive Team	Antonio “Boo” Williams, Sr., G, Kent State

== See also ==
2019–20 Mid-American Conference women's basketball season
