= 2019–20 Western Michigan Broncos men's basketball team =

American college basketball season

2019–20 Western Michigan Broncos men's basketball
- Conference: Mid-American Conference
- West Division
- Record: 13–19 (6–12 MAC)
- Head coach: Steve Hawkins (17th season)
- Assistant coaches: Clayton Bates; Thomas Kelley; Glen Heffernan
- Home arena: University Arena

2019–20 Mid-American Conference men's basketball standings
	Conf.				Overall
Team	W		L	PCT	W		L	PCT
East
Akron	14	–	4	.778	24	–	7	.774
Bowling Green	12	–	6	.667	21	–	10	.677
Buffalo	11	–	7	.611	20	–	12	.625
Kent State	9	–	9	.500	20	–	12	.625
Ohio	8	–	10	.444	17	–	15	.531
Miami (OH)	5	–	13	.278	13	–	19	.406
West
Ball State	11	–	7	.611	18	–	13	.581
Northern Illinois	11	–	7	.611	18	–	13	.581
Toledo	8	–	10	.444	17	–	15	.531
Central Michigan	7	–	11	.389	14	–	18	.438
Western Michigan	6	–	12	.333	13	–	19	.406
Eastern Michigan	6	–	12	.333	16	–	16	.500
Note: The 2020 MAC tournament was canceled prior to the quarterfinals due to the COVID-19 pandemic.

The 2019–20 Western Michigan Broncos men's basketball team represented Western Michigan University during the 2019–20 NCAA Division I men's basketball season. The Broncos were led by 17th-year head coach Steve Hawkins, and played their home games at University Arena in Kalamazoo, MI as members of the West Division of the Mid-American Conference. They finished the season 13–19, 6–12 in MAC play to finish in a tie for fifth place in the West Division. They lost in the first round of the MAC tournament to Toledo.

== Previous season ==
The Broncos finished the 2018–19 season 8–24 overall, 2–16 in MAC play to finish in last place in the West Division. As the No. 12 seed in the MAC tournament, they lost in the first round to Central Michigan.

== Roster ==
2019–20 Western Michigan Broncos men's basketball team
Players
Coaches
}

Pos.	#	Name	Height	Weight	Year	Hometown
F	0	Kawanise Wilkins	6 ft 5 in (1.96 m)	230 lb (104 kg)	Jr	Chicago, IL
F	1	Chase Barrs	6 ft 9 in (2.06 m)	185 lb (84 kg)	Fr	Tampa, FL
G	2	Adrian Martin	6 ft 3 in (1.91 m)	175 lb (79 kg)	So	Sugar Hill, GA
G	3	B. Artis White	5 ft 9 in (1.75 m)	150 lb (68 kg)	Fr	Canton, MI
G	4	Jared Printy	6 ft 4 in (1.93 m)	185 lb (84 kg)	Sr	Cedar Rapids, IA
G	10	Luke Toliver	6 ft 3 in (1.91 m)	190 lb (86 kg)	So	Paw Paw, MI
G	11	Rafael Cruz Jr.	6 ft 1 in (1.85 m)	185 lb (84 kg)	Jr	Chicago, IL
G	12	Michael Flowers	6 ft 4 in (1.93 m)	190 lb (86 kg)	Jr	Southfield, MI
F	15	Patrick Emilien	6 ft 6 in (1.98 m)	205 lb (93 kg)	So	Toronto, ON
G	20	William Boyer-Richard	6 ft 1 in (1.85 m)	190 lb (86 kg)	So	Drummondville, QC
C	22	Titus Wright	6 ft 8 in (2.03 m)	250 lb (113 kg)	Fr	Thomasville, GA
F	24	Adida Congshul	6 ft 6 in (1.98 m)	200 lb (91 kg)	Sr	Madison, IN
G	30	Jason Whitens	6 ft 4 in (1.93 m)	185 lb (84 kg)	RS So	Powers, MI
F	35	Brandon Johnson	6 ft 8 in (2.03 m)	220 lb (100 kg)	RS Jr	Chicago, IL

Head coach

- Steve Hawkins (South Alabama)

Assistant coach(es)

- Clayton Bates (Florida)
- Thomas Kelley (Michigan State)
- Glen Heffernan (Cardinal Stritch)

Legend

- (C) Team captain
- (S) Suspended
- (I) Ineligible
- (W) Walk-on
- Injured
- Current redshirt

Roster

== Schedule and results ==
Date time, TV	Rank^{#}	Opponent^{#}	Result	Record	Site (attendance) city, state
Exhibition
November 2, 2019*		Kalamazoo	W 76–56		University Arena; Kalamazoo, MI
Non-conference regular season
November 6, 2019*; 7:00 pm, ESPN+		McNeese State	W 75–65	1–0	University Arena (1,690); Kalamazoo, MI
November 9, 2019*; 7:00 pm, ESPN3		at Milwaukee	W 115–110 ^{3OT}	2–0	UW–Milwaukee Panther Arena (2,038); Milwaukee, WI
November 12, 2019*; 7:00 pm, ESPN+		Mississippi Valley State	W 91–81	3–0	University Arena (1,591); Kalamazoo, MI
November 15, 2019*; 7:00 pm, SECN+		at Ole Miss; NIT Season Tip-Off campus site game	L 58–85	3–1	The Pavilion at Ole Miss (7,310); Oxford, MS
November 19, 2019*; 7:00 pm, ESPN3		Alma	W 102–56	4–1	University Arena (1,804); Kalamazoo, MI
November 22, 2019*; 8:00 pm, ESPN+		at Oklahoma State; NIT Season Tip-Off campus site game	L 63–70	4–2	Gallagher-Iba Arena (6,097); Stillwater, OK
November 25, 2019*; 12:00 pm, ESPNU		vs. Yale; NIT Season Tip-Off Orlando Bracket	L 51–73	4–3	HP Field House (250); Orlando, FL
November 26, 2019*; 12:00 pm, ESPNU		vs. Seattle; NIT Season Tip-Off Orlando Bracket	L 55–59	4–4	HP Field House (250); Orlando, FL
December 3, 2019*; 7:00 pm, ESPN+		Oakland	L 62–72	4–5	University Arena (2,114); Kalamazoo, MI
December 7, 2019*; 2:00 pm, ESPN+		Youngstown State	W 66–64	5–5	University Arena (1,658); Kalamazoo, MI
December 14, 2019*; 7:00 pm, ESPN+		at Manhattan	W 59–58	6–5	Draddy Gymnasium (1,002); Bronx, NY
December 18, 2019*; 7:00 pm, ESPN3		Aquinas (MI)	W 84–61	7–5	University Arena (1,409); Kalamazoo, MI
December 29, 2019*; 8:00 pm, BTN		at No. 14 Michigan State	L 62–95	7–6	Breslin Student Events Center (14,797); East Lansing, MI
MAC regular season
January 4, 2020; 4:00 pm, ESPN3		Ohio	W 77–65	8–6 (1–0)	University Arena (2,683); Kalamazoo, MI
January 7, 2020; 7:00 pm, ESPN+		at Akron	L 69–84	8–7 (1–1)	James A. Rhodes Arena (2,522); Akron, OH
January 11, 2020; 7:00 pm, ESPN3		at Toledo	L 59–67	8–8 (1–2)	Savage Arena (4,371); Toledo, OH
January 14, 2020; 7:00 pm, ESPN+		Bowling Green	L 82–85	8–9 (1–3)	University Arena (1,863); Kalamazoo, MI
January 18, 2020; 4:30 pm, ESPN3		Kent State	W 67–63	9–9 (2–3)	University Arena (2,110); Kalamazoo, MI
January 21, 2020; 7:00 pm, ESPN+		at Buffalo	L 79–90	9–10 (2–4)	Alumni Arena (2,748); Amherst, NY
January 25, 2020; 4:00 pm, ESPN3		at Northern Illinois	L 52–58	9–11 (2–5)	Convocation Center (1,030); DeKalb, IL
February 1, 2020; 2:00 pm, ESPN3		Central Michigan	L 78–85	9–12 (2–6)	University Arena (3,416); Kalamazoo, MI
February 4, 2020; 7:00 pm, ESPN+		at Miami (OH)	W 64–60	10–12 (3–6)	Millett Hall (1,245); Oxford, OH
February 8, 2020; 4:30 pm, ESPN3		Ball State	W 68–64	11–12 (4–6)	University Arena (2,387); Kalamazoo, MI
February 11, 2020; 7:00 pm, ESPN+		at Ohio	L 61–73	11–13 (4–7)	Convocation Center (4,372); Athens, OH
February 15, 2020; 2:00 pm, ESPN3		at Eastern Michigan	L 51–69	11–14 (4–8)	Convocation Center (4,324); Ypsilanti, MI
February 18, 2020; 7:00 pm, ESPN+		Akron	L 67–71	11–15 (4–9)	University Arena (1,652); Kalamazoo, MI
February 22, 2020; 2:00 pm, ESPN3		Toledo	L 59–68	11–16 (4–10)	University Arena (2,264); Kalamazoo, MI
February 25, 2020; 7:00 pm, ESPN+		at Ball State	L 61–71	11–17 (4–11)	Worthen Arena (4,390); Muncie, IN
February 29, 2020; 4:30 pm, ESPN+		Northern Illinois	W 72–69	12–17 (5–11)	University Arena (2,488); Kalamazoo, MI
March 3, 2020; 7:00 pm, ESPN+		Eastern Michigan	W 70–54	13–17 (6–11)	University Arena (1,821); Kalamazoo, MI
March 6, 2020; 7:00 pm, ESPN3		at Central Michigan; Michigan MAC Trophy	L 68–85	13–18 (6–12)	McGuirk Arena (2,264); Mount Pleasant, MI
MAC tournament
March 9, 2020; 7:00 pm, ESPN+	(10)	at (7) Toledo; First round	L 73–76	13–19	Savage Arena (3,286); Toledo, OH
*Non-conference game. ^{#}Rankings from AP Poll. (#) Tournament seedings in parentheses. All times are in Eastern Time Zone.
