= 2019–20 Eastern Michigan Eagles men's basketball team =

American college basketball season

2019–20 Eastern Michigan Eagles men's basketball

Jamaica Classic Rose Hall Division champions
- Conference: Mid-American Conference
- West Division
- Record: 16–16 (6–12 MAC)
- Head coach: Rob Murphy (9th season)
- Assistant coaches: Kevin Mondro; Matt Cline; Jimmy Wooten
- Home arena: Convocation Center

2019–20 Mid-American Conference men's basketball standings
	Conf.				Overall
Team	W		L	PCT	W		L	PCT
East
Akron	14	–	4	.778	24	–	7	.774
Bowling Green	12	–	6	.667	21	–	10	.677
Buffalo	11	–	7	.611	20	–	12	.625
Kent State	9	–	9	.500	20	–	12	.625
Ohio	8	–	10	.444	17	–	15	.531
Miami (OH)	5	–	13	.278	13	–	19	.406
West
Ball State	11	–	7	.611	18	–	13	.581
Northern Illinois	11	–	7	.611	18	–	13	.581
Toledo	8	–	10	.444	17	–	15	.531
Central Michigan	7	–	11	.389	14	–	18	.438
Western Michigan	6	–	12	.333	13	–	19	.406
Eastern Michigan	6	–	12	.333	16	–	16	.500
Note: The 2020 MAC tournament was canceled prior to the quarterfinals due to the COVID-19 pandemic.

The 2019–20 Eastern Michigan Eagles men's basketball team represented Eastern Michigan University during the 2019–20 NCAA Division I men's basketball season. The Eagles, led by ninth-year head coach Rob Murphy, played their home games at the Convocation Center in Ypsilanti, Michigan as members of the West Division of the Mid-American Conference. They finished the season 16–16, 6–12 in MAC play to finish in a tie for last place in the West Division. They lost in the first round of the MAC tournament to Kent State.

== Previous season ==
The Eagles finished the 2018–19 NCAA Division I men's basketball season 15–17, 9–9 in MAC play to finish in third place in the West Division. They lost in the quarterfinals of the MAC tournament to Ball State.

== Offseason ==
=== Departures ===
Name	Number	Pos.	Height	Weight	Year	Hometown	Notes
Daivon Stephens	1	F	6'6"	206	Freshman	Pittsburgh, PA	Transferred to Tallahassee Community College
James Thompson IV	2	F/C	6'10"	241	Senior	Baton Rouge, LA	Graduated
Paul Jackson	3	G	6'2"	178	RS Senior	Stone Mountain, GA	Graduated
Elijah Minnie	5	F	6'9"	212	RS Senior	Pittsburgh, PA	Graduated
Malik Ellison	10	G	5'8"	170	Sophomore	Flint, MI	Transferred to Saginaw Valley State
Bud Jones	20	F	6'8"	265	Sophomore	Anderson, SC	
Kevin McAdoo	21	G	6'2"	167	Sophomore	Pontiac, MI	Transferred to Bradley
Tariq Silver	22	G	6'5"	202	RS Freshman	Clarksville, TN	Transferred to Tallahassee Community College
Andre Rafus Jr.	25	G/F	6'9"	178	Freshman	Baltimore, MD	
Isaiah Green	32	F	6'7"	204	Senior	Southfield, MI	Graduated

=== Incoming ===
Name	Number	Pos.	Height	Weight	Year	Hometown	Previous School
Yeikson Montero	0	G	6'5"	195	Junior	Santo Domingo, Dominican Republic	Redemption Christian/Pensacola State
Chris Barnes	1	G	6'4"	205	RS Junior	Compton, CA	Compton/Tulsa
Marcus Gibbs	3	G	6'0"	147	Freshman	Detroit, MI	SPIRE Institute
Noah Morgan	5	G/F	6'5"	182	Junior	Mount Vernon, NY	Mount Vernon/Northwest Florida State
Shamar Dillard	12	G	6'6"	185	Freshman	South Bend, ID	SPIRE Institute
Chris James	13	G	6'2"	170	Freshman	Long Beach, CA	St. John Bosco
Luis Pacheco	22	F	6'8"	245	Freshman	Jamesburg, NJ	Crestwood Prep
Thomas Binelli	23	F	6'10"	225	Junior	Bologna, Italy	Bergen Catholic/Monroe College
Miles Gibson	32	G/F	6'6"	198	Junior	Richmond, VA	Millwood School/Northwest Kansas Tech

== Roster ==
2019–20 Eastern Michigan Eagles men's basketball team
Players
Coaches

Pos.	#	Name	Height	Weight	Year	Previous school	Hometown
G	0	Yeikson Montero	6 ft 5 in (1.96 m)	195 lb (88 kg)	Jr	Redemption Christian/Pensacola State	Santo Domingo, DR
G	1	Chris Barnes	6 ft 4 in (1.93 m)	205 lb (93 kg)	RS Jr	Compton/Tulsa	Compton, CA
G	3	Marcus Gibbs	6 ft 0 in (1.83 m)	147 lb (67 kg)	Fr	SPIRE Institute	Detroit, MI
G	4	Damari Parris	6 ft 1 in (1.85 m)	157 lb (71 kg)	Sr	Evelyn Mack Academy/ Trinity Valley CC	Bowie, MD
G/F	5	Noah Morgan	6 ft 5 in (1.96 m)	182 lb (83 kg)	Jr	Mount Vernon/Northwest Florida State	Mount Vernon, NY
G	10	Darion Spottsville	6 ft 3 in (1.91 m)	195 lb (88 kg)	Jr	Shadow Mountain/South Mountain CC	Phoenix, AZ
G	12	Shamar Dillard	6 ft 6 in (1.98 m)	185 lb (84 kg)	Fr	SPIRE Institute	South Bend, ID
G	13	Chris James	6 ft 2 in (1.88 m)	170 lb (77 kg)	Fr	St. John Bosco High School	Long Beach, CA
G	20	Jorden Peterson	6 ft 4 in (1.93 m)	175 lb (79 kg)	RS So	CMA	Detroit, MI
C	21	Boubacar Toure	6 ft 11 in (2.11 m)	241 lb (109 kg)	RS Sr	Phase One Academy/Grand Canyon	Dakar, Senegal
F	22	Luis Pacheco	6 ft 8 in (2.03 m)	245 lb (111 kg)	Fr	Crestwood Prep	Jamesburg, NJ
F	23	Thomas Binelli	6 ft 10 in (2.08 m)	225 lb (102 kg)	Jr	Bergen Catholic/Monroe College	Bologna, Italy
F	31	Ty Groce	6 ft 7 in (2.01 m)	207 lb (94 kg)	RS Jr	Lincoln	Ypsilanti, MI
G/F	32	Miles Gibson	6 ft 6 in (1.98 m)	198 lb (90 kg)	Jr	Millwood School/Northwest Kansas Tech	Richmond, VA
F	33	Derek Ballard Jr.	6 ft 8 in (2.03 m)	229 lb (104 kg)	RS So	Southfield-Lathrup	Southfield, MI
F	45	Jalen King	6 ft 9 in (2.06 m)	215 lb (98 kg)	Jr	Kings Academy	Pasco, WA

Head coach

- Rob Murphy (Central State)

Assistant coach(es)

- Kevin Mondro (Detroit Mercy)
- Matt Kline (South Alabama)
- Jimmy Wooten (Arkansas State)

Legend

- (C) Team captain
- (S) Suspended
- (I) Ineligible
- (W) Walk-on
- Injured
- Current redshirt

Roster
Last update: Dec. 19, 2019

== Schedule and results ==
Date time, TV	Rank^{#}	Opponent^{#}	Result	Record	High points	High rebounds	High assists	Site (attendance) city, state
Non-conference regular season
November 8, 2019*; 9:45 am, ESPN3		Siena Heights	W 93–51	1–0	15 – Groce	10 – Toure	5 – Morgan	Convocation Center (3,088); Ypsilanti, MI
November 12, 2019*; 7:00 pm, ESPN+		Goshen	W 101–49	2–0	19 – Groce	8 – Toure	5 – Morgan	Convocation Center (499); Ypsilanti, MI
November 14, 2019*; 7:00 pm, ESPN+		Michigan–Dearborn; Jamaica Classic	W 72–59	3–0	15 – Tied	14 – Toure	4 – Montero	Convocation Center (997); Ypsilanti, MI
November 16, 2019*; 4:00 pm		at North Texas; Jamaica Classic	W 56–51	4–0	15 – Groce	8 – Toure	4 – Montero	UNT Coliseum (2,380); Denton, TX
November 22, 2019*; 2:00 pm, CBSSN		vs. UMBC; Jamaica Classic Rose Hall Division semifinals	W 62–45	5–0	11 – Morgan	11 – Groce	3 – Morgan	Montego Bay Convention Center; Montego Bay, Jamaica
November 24, 2019*; 12:00 pm, CBSSN		vs. North Carolina A&T; Jamaica Classic Rose Hall Division finals	W 58–54	6–0	12 – Tied	5 – Morgan	3 – Morgan	Montego Bay Convention Center; Montego Bay, Jamaica
November 30, 2019*; 10:00 pm		at UC Irvine	L 56–77	6–1	14 – Toure	12 – Toure	1 – Tied	Bren Events Center (2,813); Irvine, CA
December 3, 2019*; 7:00 pm, ESPN+		Valparaiso	W 85–79	7–1	21 – Morgan	7 – Toure	3 – Barnes	Convocation Center (1,237); Ypsilanti, MI
December 7, 2019*; 1:00 pm		at Detroit	W 55–51	8–1	16 – Tied	10 – Toure	7 – Spottsville	Calihan Hall (1,925); Detroit, MI
December 17, 2019*; 7:00 pm, ESPN+		Northeastern	W 60–55	9–1	19 – Morgan	6 – Tied	2 – Tied	Convocation Center (1,077); Ypsilanti, MI
December 21, 2019*; 7:00 pm, BTN		at No. 15 Michigan State	L 48–101	9–2	9 – Groce	10 – King	2 – Tied	Breslin Center (14,797); East Lansing, MI
December 28, 2019*; 3:00 pm		at UNLV	L 49–64	9–3	12 – Groce	11 – Toure	4 – Groce	Thomas & Mack Center (7,463); Las Vegas, NV
December 30, 2019*; 2:00 pm, ESPN3		Concordia (MI)	W 88–53	10–3	14 – Toure	9 – Groce	5 – Groce	Convocation Center (1,171); Ypsilanti, MI
MAC regular season
January 4, 2020; 12:00 pm, ESPN+		Akron	L 45–69	10–4 (0–1)	13 – Groce	17 – Toure	3 – Montero	Convocation Center (1,411); Ypsilanti, MI
January 7, 2020; 7:00 pm, ESPN+		at Ohio	L 68–74	10–5 (0–2)	18 – Montero	10 – Toure	4 – Groce	Convocation Center (OH) (3,109); Athens, OH
January 11, 2020; 4:30 pm, ESPN3		at Northern Illinois	L 68–71	10–6 (0–3)	16 – Morgan	11 – Toure	3 – 3 tied	NIU Convocation Center (1,074); Dekalb, IL
January 14, 2020; 7:00 pm, ESPN+		Ball State	L 52–69	10–7 (0–4)	14 – Morgan	9 – Toure	3 – Binelli	Convocation Center (1,313); Ypsilanti, MI
January 18, 2020; 2:00 pm, ESPN3		Ohio	L 58–60	10–8 (0–5)	23 – Morgan	10 – King	2 – Morgan	Convocation Center (1,322); Ypsilanti, MI
January 21, 2020; 7:00 pm, ESPN+		at Bowling Green	L 59–62	10–9 (0–6)	17 – Toure	13 – Toure	2 – Barnes	Stroh Center (2,022); Bowling Green, OH
January 25, 2020; 2:00 pm, ESPN+		at Miami (OH)	L 68–73	10–10 (0–7)	17 – Binelli	12 – Toure	4 – Spottsville	Millett Hall (1,144); Oxford, OH
February 1, 2020; 2:00 pm, ESPN3		Toledo	W 61–57	11–10 (1–7)	26 – Montero	16 – Toure	4 – Spottsville	Convocation Center (2,382); Ypsilanti, MI
February 4, 2020; 7:00 pm, ESPN+		Buffalo	W 66–62	12–10 (2–7)	14 – Groce	5 – Tied	3 – Tied	Convocation Center (1,364); Ypsilanti, MI
February 8, 2020; 7:00 pm, ESPN3		at Akron	L 58–59	12–11 (2–8)	15 – Groce	10 – Toure	2 – Tied	James A. Rhodes Arena (3,290); Akron, OH
February 11, 2020; 7:00 pm, ESPN+		at Central Michigan; Michigan MAC Trophy	W 73–70	13–11 (3–8)	22 – Groce	13 – Toure	3 – 3 tied	McGuirk Arena (1,929); Mount Pleasant, MI
February 15, 2020; 12:00 pm, ESPN3		Western Michigan; Michigan MAC Trophy	W 69–51	14–11 (4–8)	17 – Toure	6 – Toure	6 – Groce	Convocation Center (4,324); Ypsilanti, MI
February 18, 2020; 7:00 pm, ESPN+		Kent State	W 70–49	15–11 (5–8)	15 – Groce	9 – Groce	3 – Spottsville	Convocation Center (1,196); Ypsilanti, MI
February 22, 2020; 1:00 pm, ESPN3		at Ball State	L 55–64	15–12 (5–9)	16 – Toure	8 – Toure	4 – Groce	Worthen Arena (5,921); Muncie, IN
February 25, 2020; 7:00 pm, ESPN+		Northern Illinois	L 71–73	15–13 (5–10)	26 – Binelli	10 – Toure	4 – Tied	Convocation Center (1,378); Ypsilanti, MI
February 29, 2020; 12:00 pm, ESPN+		Central Michigan; Michigan MAC Trophy	W 67–63	16–13 (6–10)	17 – Montero	14 – Toure	3 – Groce	Convocation Center (1,640); Ypsilanti, MI
March 3, 2020; 7:00 pm, ESPN+		at Western Michigan	L 54–70	16–14 (6–11)	11 – Groce	12 – Toure	2 – Spottsville	University Arena (1,821); Kalamazoo, MI
March 6, 2020; 7:00 pm, ESPN3		at Toledo	L 57–79	16–15 (6–12)	12 – Tied	5 – Toure	5 – Spottsville	Savage Arena (4,823); Toledo, OH
MAC Tournament
March 9, 2020; 7:00 pm, ESPN+	(11)	at (6) Kent State; First round	L 76–86	16–16	14 – Tied	13 – Toure	5 – Groce	MAC Center (2,008); Kent, OH
*Non-conference game. ^{#}Rankings from AP Poll. (#) Tournament seedings in parentheses. All times are in Eastern Time Source.
