= 2020 MAC men's basketball tournament =

- Classification: Division I
- Season: 2019–20
- Teams: 12
- Site: Rocket Mortgage FieldHouse; Cleveland, Ohio
- First round site: Campus sites
- Television: CBSSN, ESPN2, ESPN+
- MAC men's basketball tournaments

2019–20 Mid-American Conference men's basketball standings
	Conf.				Overall
Team	W		L	PCT	W		L	PCT
East
Akron	14	–	4	.778	24	–	7	.774
Bowling Green	12	–	6	.667	21	–	10	.677
Buffalo	11	–	7	.611	20	–	12	.625
Kent State	9	–	9	.500	20	–	12	.625
Ohio	8	–	10	.444	17	–	15	.531
Miami (OH)	5	–	13	.278	13	–	19	.406
West
Ball State	11	–	7	.611	18	–	13	.581
Northern Illinois	11	–	7	.611	18	–	13	.581
Toledo	8	–	10	.444	17	–	15	.531
Central Michigan	7	–	11	.389	14	–	18	.438
Western Michigan	6	–	12	.333	13	–	19	.406
Eastern Michigan	6	–	12	.333	16	–	16	.500
Note: The 2020 MAC tournament was canceled prior to the quarterfinals due to the COVID-19 pandemic.

The 2020 Mid-American Conference men's basketball tournament was the post-season men's basketball tournament for the Mid-American Conference (MAC). The tournament's first-round games were held on campus sites at the higher seed on March 9. The remaining rounds were to be held at Rocket Mortgage FieldHouse in Cleveland on March 12, 13, and 14, 2020 and the champion was to receive the MAC's automatic bid to the NCAA tournament. Just prior to the scheduled game on March 12 between top-seeded Akron and eighth-seeded Ohio, the conference announced that the remainder of the tournament, and the remainder of the women's tournament, were canceled in response to concerns over the coronavirus pandemic.

== Seeds ==
All 12 MAC teams participated in the tournament. Teams were seeded by record within the conference, with a tiebreaker system to seed teams with identical conference records. The top four teams received a bye to quarterfinals.

Seed	School	Conference record	Division	Tiebreaker(s)
1	Akron	14–4	East	
2	Bowling Green	12–6	East	
3	Ball State	11–7	West	3–1 vs. tied teams (2–0 vs. NIU, 1–1 vs. UB)
4	Northern Illinois	11–7	West	No. 1: 1–2 vs. tied teams (1–0 vs. UB, 0–2 vs. BSU); No. 2: 1–0 vs. UB
5	Buffalo	11–7	East	No. 1: 1–2 vs. tied teams (1–1 vs. BSU, 0–1 vs. NIU); No. 2: 0–1 vs. NIU
6	Kent State	9–9	East	
7	Toledo	8–10	West	1–0 vs. Ohio
8	Ohio	8–10	East	0–1 vs. Toledo
9	Central Michigan	7–11	West	
10	Western Michigan	6–12	West	No. 1: 1–1 vs. EMU; No. 2: 0–2 (.000) vs. No. 1 Akron; No. 3: 0–1 (.000) vs. No. 2 BGSU; No. 4: 1–1 (.500) vs. No. 3 BSU
11	Eastern Michigan	6–12	West	No. 1: 1–1 vs. WMU; No. 2: 0–2 (.000) vs. No. 1 Akron; No. 3: 0–1 (.000) vs. No. 2 BGSU; No. 4: 0–2 (.000) vs. No. 3 BSU
12	Miami (OH)	5–13	East	

== Schedule ==
Game	Time	Matchup	Score	Television
First round – Monday, March 9 – Campus sites
1	7:00 p.m.	No. 9 Central Michigan at No. 8 Ohio	65–85	ESPN+
2	7:30 p.m.	No. 12 Miami (OH) at No. 5 Buffalo	85–79	ESPN+
3	7:00 p.m.	No. 10 Western Michigan at No. 7 Toledo	73–76	ESPN+
4	7:00 p.m.	No. 11 Eastern Michigan at No. 6 Kent State	76–86	ESPN+
Quarterfinals – Thursday, March 12 – Rocket Mortgage FieldHouse, Cleveland, OH
5	12:00 pm	No. 8 Ohio vs. No. 1 Akron	cancelled	ESPN+
6	2:30 pm	No. 12 Miami (OH) vs. No. 4 Northern Illinois	cancelled	ESPN+
7	6:30 pm	No. 7 Toledo vs. No. 2 Bowling Green	cancelled	ESPN+
8	9:00 pm	No. 6 Kent State vs. No. 3 Ball State	cancelled	ESPN+
Semifinals – Friday, March 13 – Rocket Mortgage FieldHouse, Cleveland, OH
9	7:00 pm	Game 5 Winner vs. Game 6 Winner	cancelled	CBSSN
10	9:30 pm	Game 7 Winner vs. Game 8 Winner	cancelled	CBSSN
Championship – Saturday, March 14 – Rocket Mortgage FieldHouse, Cleveland, OH
11	7:30 pm	Game 9 Winner vs. Game 10 Winner	cancelled	ESPN2
Game times in ET. Rankings denote tournament seed

== Bracket ==
First round Monday, March 9
8	Ohio	85
9	Central Michigan	65
5	Buffalo	79
12	Miami (OH)	85
7	Toledo	76
10	Western Michigan	73
6	Kent State	86
11	Eastern Michigan	76

Quarterfinals; Thursday, March 12
1	Akron
8	Ohio
4	Northern Illinois
12	Miami (OH)
2	Bowling Green
7	Toledo
3	Ball State
6	Kent State

Semifinals; Friday, March 13

Championship; Saturday, March 14

* denotes overtime period

== See also ==
- 2020 MAC women's basketball tournament
