= 2019–20 Akron Zips men's basketball team =

American college basketball season

2019–20 Akron Zips men's basketball

MAC Regular Season Champions MAC East Division Champions
- Conference: Mid-American Conference
- East Division
- Record: 24–7 (14–4 MAC)
- Head coach: John Groce (3rd season)
- Associate head coach: Dustin Ford
- Assistant coaches: Rob Fulford; Robby Pridgen
- Home arena: James A. Rhodes Arena

2019–20 Mid-American Conference men's basketball standings
	Conf.				Overall
Team	W		L	PCT	W		L	PCT
East
Akron	14	–	4	.778	24	–	7	.774
Bowling Green	12	–	6	.667	21	–	10	.677
Buffalo	11	–	7	.611	20	–	12	.625
Kent State	9	–	9	.500	20	–	12	.625
Ohio	8	–	10	.444	17	–	15	.531
Miami (OH)	5	–	13	.278	13	–	19	.406
West
Ball State	11	–	7	.611	18	–	13	.581
Northern Illinois	11	–	7	.611	18	–	13	.581
Toledo	8	–	10	.444	17	–	15	.531
Central Michigan	7	–	11	.389	14	–	18	.438
Western Michigan	6	–	12	.333	13	–	19	.406
Eastern Michigan	6	–	12	.333	16	–	16	.500
Note: The 2020 MAC tournament was canceled prior to the quarterfinals due to the COVID-19 pandemic.

The 2019–20 Akron Zips men's basketball team represented the University of Akron during the 2019–20 NCAA Division I men's basketball season. The Zips, led by third-year head coach John Groce, play their home games at the James A. Rhodes Arena as members of the East Division of the Mid-American Conference.

== Previous season ==
The Zips finished the 2018–19 season 17–16, 8–10 in MAC play to finish in fourth place in the East Division. In the MAC tournament, they defeated Miami (OH) in the first round before losing to Buffalo in the quarterfinals.

== Offseason ==
=== Departures ===
Name	Number	Pos.	Height	Weight	Year	Hometown	Reason for departure
Jimond Ivey	0	G	6’5”	200	RS Senior	Cleveland, OH	Graduated
Daniel Utomi	3	F	6’6”	215	RS Junior	Houston, TX	Transferred to USC
Jeremy Roscoe	13	G	6’2”	190	Sophomore	Chicago, IL	Transferred from program
Emmanuel Olojakpoke	22	F	6’8”	190	Senior	Houston, TX	Transferred to Utah Valley
Jake Fischer	24	G	6'4"	180	Sophomore	Columbus, OH	Walk-on; left the team for personal reasons
Mark Kostelac	44	C	6’11”	250	Sophomore	Cleveland, OH	Left mid-season
Khadim Gueye	50	C	7’0”	245	Junior	Dakar, Senegal	Suspended mid-season; transferred to University of Tampa

=== Incoming transfers ===
Name	Number	Pos.	Height	Weight	Year	Hometown	Previous School
Maishe Dailey	3	F	6’7”	195	Senior	Beachwood, OH	Transferred from Iowa. Under NCAA transfer rules, Williams will have to sit out for the 2019–20 season. Will have one year of remaining eligibility.
Cameron Reece	5	F	6’7”		Junior	Oakland, CA	Junior college transferred from Sheridan College
Bryan Trimble Jr.	15	G	6’2”	216	Junior	Kansas City, MO	Transferred from St. John's. Under NCAA transfer rules, Trimble will have to sit out for the 2019–20 season. Will have two years of remaining eligibility.

=== 2019 recruiting class ===
College recruiting information
Name	Hometown	School	Height	Weight	Commit date
Greg Tribble; SG	Cincinnati, OH	Winton Woods	6 ft 3 in (1.91 m)	175 lb (79 kg)	Apr 28, 2019
Greg Tribble; SG	Recruit ratings: Scout: Rivals: 247Sports: (NR)				
Ali Ali; SF	Kendallville, IN	East Noble High School	6 ft 7 in (2.01 m)	185 lb (84 kg)	Aug 29, 2018
Ali Ali; SF	Recruit ratings: Scout: Rivals: 247Sports: (NR)				
Mikal Dawson; SG	Huntington, WV	Huntington Prep School	6 ft 4 in (1.93 m)	200 lb (91 kg)	Aug 26, 2018
Mikal Dawson; SG	Recruit ratings: Scout: Rivals: 247Sports: (NR)				
Camron Reece; PF	Oakland, CA	Sheridan College	6 ft 6 in (1.98 m)	220 lb (100 kg)	Sep 30, 2018
Camron Reece; PF	Recruit ratings: Scout: Rivals: 247Sports: (NR)				
Overall recruit ranking:
Note: In many cases, Scout, Rivals, 247Sports, On3, and ESPN may conflict in their listings of height and weight.; In these cases, the average was taken. ESPN grades are on a 100-point scale.; Sources: "2019 Team Ranking". Rivals.

== Roster ==
2019–20 Akron Zips men's basketball team
Players
Coaches

Pos.	#	Name	Height	Weight	Year	Previous school	Hometown
G	0	Tre Edwards	6 ft 6 in (1.98 m)	188 lb (85 kg)	Fr	Hamilton Heights Christian Academy/Link Year Prep	Hamilton, ON
G	1	Loren Cristian Jackson	5 ft 8 in (1.73 m)	160 lb (73 kg)	RS Jr	Victory Rock Prep; Long Beach State	Chicago, IL
G	2	Greg Tribble Jr.	6 ft 1 in (1.85 m)	192 lb (87 kg)	Fr	Huntington Prep	Cincinnati, OH
F	3	Maishe Dailey (redshirt)	6 ft 7 in (2.01 m)	195 lb (88 kg)	Sr	Beachwood; Iowa	Beachwood, OH
G	4	Tyler Cheese	6 ft 5 in (1.96 m)	195 lb (88 kg)	Sr	Albany; Florida Southwestern State	Albany, GA
F	5	Camron Reece	6 ft 7 in (2.01 m)	228 lb (103 kg)	Jr	Oakland Tech; Sheridan College	Oakland, CA
C	10	Deng Riak	6 ft 10 in (2.08 m)	225 lb (102 kg)	Sr	Victory Rock Prep; East Carolina	Melbourne, Australia
G	11	Channel Banks	6 ft 4 in (1.93 m)	186 lb (84 kg)	Sr	Hillcrest Prep; Sheridan College	Las Vegas, NV
G	12	Marquelle Mcintyre (W)	5 ft 10 in (1.78 m)	175 lb (79 kg)	Sr	Greensboro Day School	Greensboro, NC
G	14	Scott Walter (W)	5 ft 10 in (1.78 m)	170 lb (77 kg)	So	St. Vincent-St. Mary	Akron, OH
G	15	Bryan Trimble Jr. (redshirt)	6 ft 2 in (1.88 m)	216 lb (98 kg)	Jr	Sunrise Christian Academy; St. John’s	Beachwood, OH
F	20	Xeyrius Williams	6 ft 9 in (2.06 m)	205 lb (93 kg)	Sr	Wayne; Dayton	Huber Heights, OH
F	21	Enrique Freeman	6 ft 7 in (2.01 m)	205 lb (93 kg)	RS Fr	St. Martin De Porres High School	Cleveland, OH
F	23	Jaden Sayles	6 ft 9 in (2.06 m)	235 lb (107 kg)	Jr	Sycamore	Cincinnati, OH
F	24	Ali Ali	6 ft 8 in (2.03 m)	206 lb (93 kg)	Fr	East Noble High School	Kendallville, IN
G	25	LePear Toles	6 ft 6 in (1.98 m)	195 lb (88 kg)	RS So	Canton McKinley; State Fair CC	Canton, OH

Head coach

- John Groce (Taylor)

Assistant coach(es)

- Dustin Ford (Ohio)
- Rob Fulford (Marshall)
- Robby Pridgen (Roanoke)

Legend

- (C) Team captain
- (S) Suspended
- (I) Ineligible
- (W) Walk-on
- Injured
- Current redshirt

Roster

== Schedule and results ==
Date time, TV	Rank^{#}	Opponent^{#}	Result	Record	Site (attendance) city, state
Non-conference regular season
Nov 5, 2019*; 7:00 pm		Malone	W 81–64	1–0	James A. Rhodes Arena; Akron, OH
Nov 8, 2019*; 7:00 pm, ATTSNPT		at West Virginia	L 84–94	1–1	WVU Coliseum (12,513); Morgantown, WV
Nov 15, 2019*; 7:00 pm, ESPN3		North Carolina Central; Global Sports Shootout	W 57–47	2–1	James A. Rhodes Arena (2,103); Akron, OH
Nov 18, 2019*; 7:00 pm, ESPN+		USC Upstate; Global Sports Shootout	W 76–45	3–1	James A. Rhodes Arena; Akron, OH
Nov 21, 2019*; 7:00 pm, ESPN+		vs. Youngstown State; Global Sports Shootout	W 82–60	4–1	James A. Rhodes Arena (2,214); Akron, OH
Nov 24, 2019*; 6:00 pm, ACCN		at No. 2 Louisville; Global Sports Shootout	L 76–82	4–2	KFC Yum! Center (14,889); Louisville, KY
Nov 29, 2019*; 7:00 pm		Merrimack	W 64–47	5–2	James A. Rhodes Arena (2,028); Akron, OH
Dec 4, 2019*; 7:00 pm		at Marshall	W 85–73	6–2	Cam Henderson Center (5,350); Huntington, WV
Dec 8, 2019*; 2:00 pm		Southern	W 72–57	7–2	James A. Rhodes Arena (2,036); Akron, OH
Dec 15, 2019*; 2:00 pm		Concord	W 100–50	8–2	James A. Rhodes Arena (1,964); Akron, OH
Dec 20, 2019*; 2:30 pm, FloHoops		vs. Tulane; DC Holiday Hoops Fest	W 62–61	9–2	Entertainment and Sports Arena (707); Washington, D.C.
Dec 21, 2019*; 3:30 pm, FloHoops		vs. Liberty; DC Holiday Hoops Fest	L 67–80	9–3	Entertainment and Sports Arena (942); Washington, D.C.
Dec 30, 2019*; 7:00 pm, ESPN3		Massachusetts	W 85–79	10–3	James A. Rhodes Arena (2,375); Akron, OH
MAC Regular Season
Jan 4, 2020; 12:00 pm, ESPN+		at Eastern Michigan	W 69–45	11–3 (1–0)	Convocation Center (1,411); Ypsilanti, MI
Jan 7, 2020; 7:00 pm, ESPN+		Western Michigan	W 84–69	12–3 (2–0)	James A. Rhodes Arena (2,522); Akron, OH
Jan 10, 2020; 9:00 pm, CBSSN		Ball State	W 75–60	13–3 (3–0)	James A. Rhodes Arena (2,706); Akron, OH
Jan 14, 2020; 7:00 pm, ESPN+		at Northern Illinois	W 72–49	14–3 (4–0)	Convocation Center (884); DeKalb, IL
Jan 18, 2020; 2:00 pm, ESPN3		Toledo	L 89–99	14–4 (4–1)	Savage Arena (4,386); Toledo, OH
Jan 21, 2020; 7:00 pm, ESPN+		at Miami (OH)	W 81–60	15–4 (5–1)	Millett Hall (988); Oxford, OH
Jan 25, 2020; 3:30 pm, ESPN3		at Ohio	W 88–86	16–4 (6–1)	Convocation Center (5,012); Athens, OH
Jan 28, 2020; 7:00 pm, ESPN+		Buffalo	L 74–77	16–5 (6–2)	James A. Rhodes Arena (3,473); Akron, OH
Jan 31, 2020; 6:30 pm, CBSSN		at Kent State	L 67–68	16–6 (6–3)	MAC Center (6,339); Kent, OH
Feb 8, 2020; 7:00 pm, ESPN3		Eastern Michigan	W 59–58	17–6 (7–3)	James A. Rhodes Arena (3,290); Akron, OH
Feb 11, 2020; 7:00 pm, ESPN+		Bowling Green	W 74–59	18–6 (8–3)	James A. Rhodes Arena (3,128); Akron, OH
Feb 15, 2020; 4:30 pm, ESPN3		at Central Michigan	W 80–67	19–6 (9–3)	McGuirk Arena (1,906); Mount Pleasant, MI
Feb 18, 2020; 7:00 pm, ESPN+		at Western Michigan	W 71–67	20–6 (10–3)	University Arena (1,652); Kalamazoo, MI
Feb 22, 2020; 7:00 pm, ESPN3		Miami (OH)	W 75–65	21–6 (11–3)	James A. Rhodes Arena (4,405); Akron, OH
Feb 25, 2020; 7:00 pm, ESPN+		at Bowling Green	L 60–78	21–7 (11–4)	Stroh Center (2,925); Bowling Green, OH
Feb 29, 2020; 2:00 pm, ESPN3		at Buffalo	W 86–73	22–7 (12–4)	Alumni Arena (5,870); Buffalo, NY
Mar 3, 2020; 7:30 pm, CBSSN		Ohio	W 74–67	23–7 (13–4)	James A. Rhodes Arena (3,825); Akron, OH
Mar 6, 2020; 6:30 pm, CBSSN		Kent State	W 79–76	24–7 (14–4)	James A. Rhodes Arena (5,500); Akron, OH
MAC tournament
March 12, 2020; 12:00 pm, ESPN+	(1)	vs. (8) Ohio; Quarterfinals	MAC Tournament cancelled due to the COVID-19 pandemic		Rocket Mortgage FieldHouse; Cleveland, OH
*Non-conference game. ^{#}Rankings from AP Poll. (#) Tournament seedings in parentheses. All times are in Eastern.
