= 2019–20 Ohio Bobcats men's basketball team =

American college basketball season

2019–20 Ohio Bobcats men's basketball
- Conference: Mid-American Conference
- East Division
- Record: 17–15 (8–10 MAC)
- Head coach: Jeff Boals (1st season)
- Assistant coaches: Steve Snell; Lamar Thornton; Kyle Barlow
- Home arena: Convocation Center

2019–20 Mid-American Conference men's basketball standings
	Conf.				Overall
Team	W		L	PCT	W		L	PCT
East
Akron	14	–	4	.778	24	–	7	.774
Bowling Green	12	–	6	.667	21	–	10	.677
Buffalo	11	–	7	.611	20	–	12	.625
Kent State	9	–	9	.500	20	–	12	.625
Ohio	8	–	10	.444	17	–	15	.531
Miami (OH)	5	–	13	.278	13	–	19	.406
West
Ball State	11	–	7	.611	18	–	13	.581
Northern Illinois	11	–	7	.611	18	–	13	.581
Toledo	8	–	10	.444	17	–	15	.531
Central Michigan	7	–	11	.389	14	–	18	.438
Western Michigan	6	–	12	.333	13	–	19	.406
Eastern Michigan	6	–	12	.333	16	–	16	.500
Note: The 2020 MAC tournament was canceled prior to the quarterfinals due to the COVID-19 pandemic.

The 2019–20 Ohio University Bobcats men's basketball team represented Ohio University for the 2019–20 NCAA Division I men's basketball season. The Bobcats were led by first-year head coach Jeff Boals, who was a 1995 graduate of Ohio University. The team played their home games at the Convocation Center in Athens, Ohio as a member of the East Division of the Mid-American Conference. They finished the season 17–15, 8–10 in MAC play to finish in last place in the East division. As the No. 8 seed in the MAC tournament, they defeated Central Michigan in the first round before the tournament was canceled due to the COVID-19 pandemic.

== Previous season ==
The Bobcats finished the 2018–19 season 14–17, 6–12 in MAC play to finish in last place in the East Division. As the No. 10 seed in the MAC tournament, they were defeated in the first round by Northern Illinois.

On March 13, 2019, head coach Saul Phillips was fired. He finished his five-year tenure at Ohio with an 81–77 overall record. Five days later, the school named Ohio alum Jeff Boals, head coach at Stony Brook, as their new head coach.

== Offseason ==
=== Coaching Staff Changes ===
==== Coaching Departures ====
Coaching Departures
Name	Alma Mater	Previous position	New position
Saul Phillips	University of Wisconsin–Platteville	Head coach	Head coach (Northern State)
Will Ryan	University of Wisconsin–Milwaukee	Assistant coach	Head coach (Wheeling Jesuit)
Jason Kemp	University of Wisconsin–La Crosse	Assistant coach	Assistant coach (William & Mary)
Jared Swanson	Concordia College (Moorhead, Minnesota)	Assistant coach	Assistant coach (Northern State)

==== Coaching Additions ====
Coaching Additions
Name	Alma Mater	Previous position	New position
Jeff Boals	Ohio University	Head coach (Stony Brook)	Head coach
Steve Snell		Assistant coach (Denver)	Assistant coach
Lamar Thornton	Ohio Dominican University	Assistant coach (Stony Brook)	Assistant coach
Kyle Barlow	Concordia University Ann Arbor	Assistant coach (Toledo)	Assistant coach

=== Departures ===
Departures
Name	Number	Pos.	Height	Weight	Year	Hometown	Reason
Jason Carter	1	F	6'8"	220	Junior	Johnstown, OH	Transferred to Xavier
James Gollon	3	G	6'5"	200	Senior	Stevens Point, WI	Medical
Teyvion Kirk	4	G	6'4"	185	Junior	Joliet, IL	Transferred to Colorado State
Torey James	11	G	6'5"	190	Soph.	Hickory, NC	Transferred to Cape Fear CC
Chris McGraw	14	G	5'11"	175	Soph.	Columbus, OH	Transferred to Otterbien
Jarrell Reeves	21	F	6'5"	200	Junior	Murfreesboro, TN	Left Team
Gavin Block	22	G/F	6'7"	212	Senior	Lincoln, IL	Graduated
Antonio Cowart	23	G	6'2"	175	Senior	McComb, MS	Transferred to Mississippi College
Doug Taylor	45	F	6'9"	248	Senior	Columbus, OH	Graduated

=== Incoming transfers ===
Incoming transfers
Name	Number	Pos.	Height	Weight	Year	Hometown	Reason
Sylvester Ogbonda	11	F	6'10"	237	Senior	Port Harcourt, Nigeria	Transferred from Georgia Tech. Will have one year of eligibility remaining.

=== Recruiting class ===
College recruiting
Name	Hometown	School	Height	Weight	Commit date
Ben Roderick; SF	Powell, OH	Olentangy Liberty	6 ft 5 in (1.96 m)	185 lb (84 kg)	Apr 15, 2019
Ben Roderick; SF	Recruit ratings: Scout: Rivals: 247Sports:				
Lunden McDay; PG	Akron, OH	St. Vincent–St. Mary	6 ft 3 in (1.91 m)	185 lb (84 kg)	Oct 1, 2018
Lunden McDay; PG	Recruit ratings: Scout: Rivals: 247Sports:				
Nolan Foster; C	Mattawan, MI	Mattawan	6 ft 10 in (2.08 m)	225 lb (102 kg)	Apr 27, 2019
Nolan Foster; C	Recruit ratings: Scout: Rivals: 247Sports:				
Miles Brown; PG	Rochester, NY	Northstar Christian	6 ft 0 in (1.83 m)	165 lb (75 kg)	Apr 24, 2019
Miles Brown; PG	Recruit ratings: Scout: Rivals: 247Sports:				
Michael Brown, Jr.* PG	Rochester, NY	Northstar Christian	5 ft 10 in (1.78 m)	156 lb (71 kg)	Apr 24, 2019
Michael Brown, Jr.* PG	Recruit ratings: Scout: Rivals: 247Sports:				
Marvin Price; SF	Baltimore, MD	Patterson	6 ft 5 in (1.96 m)	210 lb (95 kg)	Apr 13, 2019
Marvin Price; SF	Recruit ratings: Scout: Rivals: 247Sports: (75)				
Overall recruit ranking:
Note: In many cases, Scout, Rivals, 247Sports, On3, and ESPN may conflict in their listings of height and weight.; In these cases, the average was taken. ESPN grades are on a 100-point scale.; Sources: "2019 Team Ranking". Rivals.

* Walk-on in 2019–20

== Roster ==
2019–20 Ohio Bobcats men's basketball team
Players
Coaches

Pos.	#	Name	Height	Weight	Year	Previous school	Hometown
G	0	Jason Preston	6 ft 4 in (1.93 m)	187 lb (85 kg)	So	Believe Sports Academy	Orlando, FL
G	1	Michael Brown, Jr. (W)	5 ft 10 in (1.78 m)	156 lb (71 kg)	Fr	Northstar Christian	Rochester, NY
F	2	Nate Springs	6 ft 10 in (2.08 m)	205 lb (93 kg)	RS Fr	United Faith Christian	Charlotte, NC
F	3	Ben Roderick	6 ft 5 in (1.96 m)	205 lb (93 kg)	Fr	Olentangy Liberty	Powell, OH
F	5	Ben Vander Plas	6 ft 8 in (2.03 m)	232 lb (105 kg)	RS So	Ripon	Ripon, WI
G	10	Connor Murrell	6 ft 7 in (2.01 m)	215 lb (98 kg)	RS Jr	Sioux City East	Sioux City, IA
F	11	Sylvester Ogbonda	6 ft 10 in (2.08 m)	237 lb (108 kg)	Sr	National Christian	Port Harcourt, Nigeria
G	12	John Tenerowicz (W)	6 ft 1 in (1.85 m)	185 lb (84 kg)	So	St. Ignatius	Cleveland, OH
G	15	Lunden McDay	6 ft 3 in (1.91 m)	185 lb (84 kg)	Fr	St. Vincent–St. Mary	Akron, OH
C	22	Nolan Foster	6 ft 10 in (2.08 m)	222 lb (101 kg)	Fr	Mattawan	Mattawan, MI
G	23	Miles Brown	6 ft 1 in (1.85 m)	180 lb (82 kg)	Fr	Northstar Christian	Rochester, NY
F	24	Mason McMurray	6 ft 7 in (2.01 m)	220 lb (100 kg)	RS Fr	Stow-Munroe Falls	Stow, OH
G	35	Jordan Dartis	6 ft 3 in (1.91 m)	185 lb (84 kg)	RS Sr	Newark	Newark, OH
F	44	Mavin Price	6 ft 5 in (1.96 m)	228 lb (103 kg)	Fr	Patterson	Baltimore, MD

Head coach

- Jeff Boals (Ohio)

Assistant coach(es)

- Lamar Thornton (Ohio Dominican)
- Steve Snell
- Kyle Barlow (Concordia–Ann Arbor)

Legend

- (C) Team captain
- (S) Suspended
- (I) Ineligible
- (W) Walk-on
- Injured
- Current redshirt

Roster

== Preseason ==
The preseason coaches' poll and league awards were announced by the league office on October 31, 2019. Ohio was picked last in the MAC East.

=== Preseason rankings ===
==== East Division ====
MAC East preseason poll
Predicted finish	Team	Votes (1st place)
1	Bowling Green	(9) 69
2	Buffalo	(3) 58
3	Kent State	43
4	Miami	37
5	Akron	33
6	Ohio	12

==== West Division ====
MAC West preseason poll
Predicted finish	Team	Votes (1st place)
1	Toledo	(11) 69
2	Northern Illinois	52
3	Ball State	(1) 51
4	Central Michigan	41
5	Western Michigan	23
6	Eastern Michigan	16

MAC Tournament Champions: Bowling Green (6), Toledo (2), Buffalo (1), Kent State (1), Miami (1), NIU (1)

== Schedule and results ==
Date time, TV	Rank^{#}	Opponent^{#}	Result	Record	Site (attendance) city, state
Exhibition
November 2, 2019; 1:00 pm		Capital	W 73–49		Convocation Center (6,104); Athens, OH
Non-conference regular season
November 5, 2019*; 7:30 pm, ESPN+		at St. Bonaventure	W 65–53	1–0	Reilly Center (4,305); St. Bonaventure, NY
November 9, 2019*; 1:00 pm		Heidelberg	W 80–50	2–0	Convocation Center (4,043); Athens, OH
November 13, 2019*; 7:00 pm		at Iona	W 81–72	3–0	Hynes Athletic Center (2,013); New Rochelle, NY
November 16, 2019*; 12:00 pm, FS2		at No. 10 Villanova; Myrtle Beach Invitational campus game	L 54–78	3–1	Wells Fargo Center (13,678); Philadelphia, PA
November 21, 2019*; 4:30 pm, ESPN2		vs. No. 24 Baylor; Myrtle Beach Invitational quarterfinal	L 53–76	3–2	HTC Center (2,269); Conway, SC
November 22, 2019*; 7:30 pm, ESPNews		vs. Utah; Myrtle Beach Invitational consolation 2nd round	L 66–80	3–3	HTC Center (1,921); Conway, SC
November 24, 2019*; 7:30 pm, ESPNews		vs. Middle Tennessee; Myrtle Beach Invitational 7th place game	W 75–63	4–3	HTC Center (1,977); Conway, SC
November 30, 2019*; 1:00 pm		Detroit Mercy	W 91–81	5–3	Convocation Center (3,030); Athens, OH
December 4, 2019*; 7:00 pm		Rio Grande	W 90–51	6–3	Convocation Center (3,333); Athens, OH
December 8, 2019*; 2:00 pm		Tennessee Tech	W 81–54	7–3	Convocation Center (3,402); Athens, OH
December 17, 2019*; 9:00 pm, ESPN2		Purdue	L 51–69	7–4	Convocation Center (5,663); Athens, OH
December 21, 2019*; 1:00 pm		Morehead State	W 82–76	8–4	Convocation Center (3,021); Athens, OH
December 29, 2019*; 2:00 pm		Campbell	L 55–63	8–5	Convocation Center (3,305); Athens, OH
MAC regular season
January 4, 2020; 4:00 pm, ESPN3		at Western Michigan	L 65–77	8–6 (0–1)	University Arena (2,683); Kalamazoo, MI
January 7, 2020; 7:00 pm, ESPN+		Eastern Michigan	W 74–68	9–6 (1–1)	Convocation Center (3,109); Athens, OH
January 11, 2020; 1:00 pm, ESPN+		Bowling Green	L 74–83	9–7 (1–2)	Convocation Center (4,811); Athens, OH
January 14, 2020; 7:00 pm, ESPN+		at Buffalo	L 73–76	9–8 (1–3)	Alumni Arena (2,404); Amherst, NY
January 18, 2020; 2:00 pm, ESPN3		at Eastern Michigan	W 60–58	10–8 (2–3)	EMU Convocation Center (1,322); Ypsilanti, MI
January 21, 2020; 7:00 pm, ESPN3		Toledo	L 74–83	10–9 (2–4)	Convocation Center; Athens, OH
January 25, 2020; 3:30 pm, ESPN3		Akron	L 86–88	10–10 (2–5)	Convocation Center (5,012); Athens, OH
January 28, 2020; 7:00 pm, ESPN+		at Northern Illinois	L 59–61	10–11 (2–6)	NIU Convocation Center (783); DeKalb, IL
February 1, 2020; 1:00 pm, ESPN3		at Ball State	L 54–65	10–12 (2–7)	Worthen Arena (5,238); Muncie, IN
February 8, 2020; 3:30 pm, ESPN3		Miami (OH)	W 77–46	11–12 (3–7)	Convocation Center (6,534); Athens, OH
February 11, 2020; 7:00 pm, ESPN+		Western Michigan	W 73–61	12–12 (4–7)	Convocation Center (4,372); Athens, OH
February 15, 2020; 1:00 pm, ESPN3		at Kent State	L 72–87	12–13 (4–8)	Memorial Athletic and Convocation Center (5,218); Kent, OH
February 18, 2020; 7:00 pm, ESPN3		Central Michigan	W 77–69	13–13 (5–8)	Convocation Center (4,547); Athens, OH
February 22, 2020; 4:30 pm, ESPN+		at Bowling Green	L 61–62	13–14 (5–9)	Stroh Center (3,795); Bowling Green, OH
February 25, 2020; 7:00 pm, ESPN+		Buffalo	W 80–69	14–14 (6–9)	Convocation Center (4,837); Athens, OH
February 28, 2020; 3:30 pm, ESPN+		Kent State	W 76-69	15–14 (7–9)	Convocation Center (5,490); Athens, OH
March 3, 2020; 7:30 pm, CBSSN		at Akron	L 67–74	15–15 (7–10)	James A. Rhodes Arena (3,825); Akron, OH
March 6, 2020; 7:00 pm, ESPN3		at Miami (OH)	W 67–65	16–15 (8–10)	Millett Hall (2,289); Oxford, OH
MAC tournament
March 9, 2020; 7:00 pm, ESPN+	(8)	(9) Central Michigan; First round	W 85–65	17–15	Convocation Center (3,312); Athens, OH
March 12, 2020; 12:00 pm, ESPN+	(8)	vs. (1) Akron; Quarterfinals	MAC Tournament cancelled due to the COVID-19 pandemic		Rocket Mortgage FieldHouse; Cleveland, OH
*Non-conference game. ^{#}Rankings from AP Poll. (#) Tournament seedings in parentheses. All times are in Eastern Time.

All games from ohiobobcats.com.

== Statistics ==
=== Team statistics ===
Final 2019–20 statistics

Record	Ohio	OPP
Scoring	2286	2192
Scoring Average	71.44	68.50
Field goals – Att	822–1837	754–1802
3-pt. Field goals – Att	272–781	239–727
Free throws – Att	370–537	445–570
Rebounds	1134	1076
Assists	471	354
Turnovers	406	405
Steals	205	199
Blocked Shots	73	76

=== Player statistics ===
			Minutes		Scoring		Total FGs			3-point FGs			Free-Throws			Rebounds								
Player	GP	GS	Tot	Avg	Pts	Avg	FG	FGA	Pct	3FG	3FA	Pct	FT	FTA	Pct	Off	Def	Tot	Avg	A	PF	TO	Stl	Blk
Jason Preston	32	32	1218	38.1	538	16.8	203	394	0.515	37	91	0.407	95	131	0.725	23	183	206	6.4	238	37	118	46	3
Ben Vander Plas	31	31	1022	33	487	15.7	183	372	0.492	41	137	0.299	80	135	0.593	39	175	214	6.9	86	84	89	32	21
Jordan Dartis	29	29	909	31.3	375	12.9	118	300	0.393	83	218	0.381	56	67	0.836	11	56	67	2.3	36	45	26	32	3
Lunden McDay	31	29	884	28.5	253	8.2	90	193	0.466	27	70	0.386	46	64	0.719	50	39	89	2.9	28	67	30	25	6
Sylvester Ogbonda	32	32	799	25	213	6.7	76	159	0.478	10	32	0.313	51	70	0.729	67	142	209	6.5	26	115	48	25	24
Ben Roderick	23	5	443	19.3	137	6	48	133	0.361	36	98	0.367	5	8	0.625	15	38	53	2.3	6	42	14	11	2
Nolan Foster	29	0	257	8.9	71	2.4	28	59	0.475	2	5	0.4	13	26	0.5	13	32	45	1.6	4	41	16	1	7
Nate Springs	21	0	179	8.5	64	3	23	48	0.479	16	40	0.4	2	2	1	6	22	28	1.3	3	20	16	5	3
Mason McMurray	18	1	219	12.2	51	2.8	20	57	0.351	11	39	0.282	0	0	0	11	30	41	2.3	10	24	4	3	3
Connor Murrell	14	0	144	10.3	31	2.2	11	42	0.262	0	15	0	9	14	0.643	11	20	31	2.2	11	21	10	3	1
Miles Brown	13	1	138	10.6	23	1.8	7	28	0.25	2	11	0.182	7	11	0.636	2	11	13	1	8	14	11	8	0
Marvin Price	7	0	54	7.7	20	2.9	6	18	0.333	4	10	0.4	4	6	0.667	2	4	6	0.9	2	6	2	5	0
Michael Brown	13	0	114	8.8	18	1.4	7	25	0.28	2	11	0.182	2	3	0.667	1	11	12	0.9	12	15	10	9	0
John Tenerowicz	4	0	20	5	5	1.3	2	9	0.222	1	4	0.25	0	0	0	0	1	1	0.3	1	1	0	0	0
Total	32	-	6400	-	2286	71.4	822	1837	0.447	272	781	0.348	370	537	0.689	299	835	1134	35.4	471	532	406	205	73
Opponents	32	-	6400	-	2192	68.5	754	1802	0.418	239	727	0.329	445	570	0.781	273	803	1076	33.6	354	572	405	199	76

Legend
GP	Games played	GS	Games started	Avg	Average per game
FG	Field-goals made	FGA	Field-goal attempts	Off	Offensive rebounds
Def	Defensive rebounds	A	Assists	TO	Turnovers
Blk	Blocks	Stl	Steals	High	Team high

== Awards and honors ==
=== Weekly Awards ===
Weekly Award Honors
Honors	Player	Position	Date Awarded	Source
MAC East player of the week	Jason Preston	G	November 18	
MAC East player of the week	Jordan Dartis	G	December 2	
MAC East player of the week	Jason Preston	G	December 9	
MAC East player of the week	Jason Preston	G	December 30	
MAC East player of the week	Jason Preston	G	February 10	

=== All-MAC Awards ===
Postseason All-MAC teams
Team	Player	Position	Year
All-MAC Second Team	Jason Preston	G	So.
All-MAC Third Team	Ben Vander Plas	F	RS-So.
All-MAC Freshman Team	Lunden McDay	G	Fr.

== See also ==
- 2019–20 Ohio Bobcats women's basketball team
