= 2019–20 Bowling Green Falcons men's basketball team =

American college basketball season

2019–20 Bowling Green Falcons men's basketball
- Conference: Mid-American Conference
- East Division
- Record: 21–10 (12–6 MAC)
- Head coach: Michael Huger (5th season)
- Assistant coaches: Anthony Stacey; Mike Summey; Kevin Noon
- Home arena: Stroh Center

2019–20 Mid-American Conference men's basketball standings
	Conf.				Overall
Team	W		L	PCT	W		L	PCT
East
Akron	14	–	4	.778	24	–	7	.774
Bowling Green	12	–	6	.667	21	–	10	.677
Buffalo	11	–	7	.611	20	–	12	.625
Kent State	9	–	9	.500	20	–	12	.625
Ohio	8	–	10	.444	17	–	15	.531
Miami (OH)	5	–	13	.278	13	–	19	.406
West
Ball State	11	–	7	.611	18	–	13	.581
Northern Illinois	11	–	7	.611	18	–	13	.581
Toledo	8	–	10	.444	17	–	15	.531
Central Michigan	7	–	11	.389	14	–	18	.438
Western Michigan	6	–	12	.333	13	–	19	.406
Eastern Michigan	6	–	12	.333	16	–	16	.500
Note: The 2020 MAC tournament was canceled prior to the quarterfinals due to the COVID-19 pandemic.

The 2019–20 Bowling Green Falcons men's basketball team represent Bowling Green State University in the 2019–20 NCAA Division I men's basketball season. The Falcons, led by 5th-year head coach Michael Huger, play their home games at the Stroh Center in Bowling Green, Ohio as members of the East Division of the Mid-American Conference.

== Previous season ==
The Falcons finished the 2018–19 season 22–12 overall, 12–6 in MAC play to finish second place in the East Division. As the No. 3 seed in the MAC tournament, they defeated Ball State in the quarterfinals, Northern Illinois in the semifinals, advancing to the championship game, where they were defeated by Buffalo. Despite their successful season, they declined any offer to play in a postseason tournament.

== Roster ==
2019–20 Bowling Green Falcons men's basketball team
Players
Coaches

Pos.	#	Name	Height	Weight	Year	Hometown
G	0	Michael Laster	6 ft 1 in (1.85 m)	175 lb (79 kg)	Sr	Manhattan, New York
G	1	Justin Turner	6 ft 4 in (1.93 m)	205 lb (93 kg)	RS Jr	Detroit, Michigan
C	2	Tayler Mattos	6 ft 11 in (2.11 m)	250 lb (113 kg)	So	New London, New Hampshire
G	3	Caleb Fields	6 ft 1 in (1.85 m)	185 lb (84 kg)	So	Cape May Court House, New Jersey
G	4	Davin Zeigler	6 ft 3 in (1.91 m)	175 lb (79 kg)	Fr	Cleveland, Ohio
G	5	Dylan Frye	6 ft 2 in (1.88 m)	185 lb (84 kg)	Sr	Miami, Florida
G/F	11	Trey Diggs	6 ft 6 in (1.98 m)	210 lb (95 kg)	Jr	Niceville, Florida
G	12	Isaac Elsasser (W)	6 ft 4 in (1.93 m)	185 lb (84 kg)	Fr	Bowling Green, Ohio
G/F	13	Chandler Turner	6 ft 7 in (2.01 m)	195 lb (88 kg)	Fr	Detroit, Michigan
G	15	Ethan Good (W)	6 ft 1 in (1.85 m)	180 lb (82 kg)	Sr	Wapakoneta, Ohio
F	21	Matiss Kulackovskis	6 ft 9 in (2.06 m)	215 lb (98 kg)	RS So	Saldus, Latvia
F	22	Marlon Sierra	6 ft 7 in (2.01 m)	225 lb (102 kg)	Sr	Miami, Florida
G/F	25	Daeqwon Plowden	6 ft 6 in (1.98 m)	215 lb (98 kg)	Jr	Philadelphia, Pennsylvania
C	35	Dylan Swingle	6 ft 10 in (2.08 m)	295 lb (134 kg)	RS Fr	Chillicothe, Ohio
C	52	Joniya Gadson	6 ft 10 in (2.08 m)	245 lb (111 kg)	Jr	Miami Gardens, Florida

Head coach

- Michael Huger (Bowling Green)

Assistant coach(es)

- Anthony Stacey (Bowling Green)
- Mike Summey (NC State)
- Kevin Noon (Rider/Bowling Green)

Legend

- (C) Team captain
- (S) Suspended
- (I) Ineligible
- (W) Walk-on
- Injured
- Current redshirt

Roster
Last update: November 23, 2019

== Schedule and results ==
Date time, TV	Rank^{#}	Opponent^{#}	Result	Record	Site (attendance) city, state
Exhibition
October 30, 2019*; 7:00 pm, WBGU		Findlay	W 88–80 ^{OT}		Stroh Center (1,421); Bowling Green, OH
Non-conference regular season
November 5, 2019*; 7:00 pm, WBGU		Tiffin	W 94–73	1–0	Stroh Center (1,519); Bowling Green, OH
November 8, 2019*; 8:00 pm, SECN+		at No. 22 LSU	L 79–88	1–1	Pete Maravich Assembly Center (9,622); Baton Rouge, LA
November 11, 2019*; 7:00 pm		vs. Jacksonville	W 75–59	2–1	Watsco Center (316); Coral Gables, FL
November 15, 2019*; 11:00 am, WBGU		Fairmont State; Paradise Jam campus-site game	W 88–66	3–1	Stroh Center (3,312); Bowling Green, OH
November 22, 2019*; 8:00 pm, FloHoops		vs. Western Kentucky; Paradise Jam quarterfinal	W 77–75	4–1	Sports and Fitness Center (1,924); St. Thomas, USVI
November 24, 2019*; 7:30 pm, FloHoops		vs. Cincinnati; Paradise Jam semifinal	W 91–84 ^{OT}	5–1	Sports and Fitness Center (1,525); St. Thomas, USVI
November 25, 2019*; 8:00 pm, FloHoops		vs. Nevada; Paradise Jam championship game	L 62–77	5–2	Sports and Fitness Center (1,924); St. Thomas, USVI
November 30, 2019*; 4:00 pm, WBGU		Dartmouth	W 76-69	6–2	Stroh Center (1,192); Bowling Green, OH
December 7, 2019*; 4:00 pm, ESPN+		Oakland	W 68–65	7–2	Stroh Center (2,124); Bowling Green, OH
December 15, 2019*; 4:00 pm, ESPN+		Cleveland State	W 72–58	8–2	Stroh Center (1,725); Bowling Green, OH
December 20, 2019*; 7:00 pm		vs. Norfolk State; Boardwalk Battle	L 67–72 ^{OT}	8–3	Boardwalk Hall (500); Atlantic City, NJ
December 21, 2019*; 2:00 pm		vs. Quinnipiac; Boardwalk Battle	L 64–69	8–4	Boardwalk Hall (500); Atlantic City, NJ
December 31, 2019*; 12:00 pm, ESPN3		Hartford	W 81–68	9–4	Stroh Center (1,632); Bowling Green, OH
MAC regular season
January 3, 2020; 9:00 pm, CBSSN		Kent State	L 61–79	9–5 (0–1)	Stroh Center (2,022); Bowling Green, OH
January 7, 2020; 7:00 pm, ESPN+		Miami (OH)	W 78–76	10–5 (1–1)	Stroh Center (1,923); Bowling Green, OH
January 11, 2020; 1:00 pm, ESPN+		at Ohio	W 83–74	11–5 (2–1)	Convocation Center (4,811); Athens, OH
January 14, 2020; 7:00 pm, ESPN+		at Western Michigan	W 85–82	12–5 (3–1)	University Arena (1,863); Kalamazoo, MI
January 18, 2020; 4:00 pm, ESPN+		Northern Illinois	W 66–64	13–5 (4–1)	Stroh Center (1,925); Bowling Green, OH
January 21, 2020; 7:00 pm, ESPN+		Eastern Michigan	W 62–59	14–5 (5–1)	Stroh Center (2,022); Bowling Green, OH
January 25, 2020; 7:00 pm, ESPN3		at Toledo	W 85–79	15–5 (6–1)	Savage Arena (7,268); Toledo, OH
January 28, 2020; 7:00 pm, ESPN+		Ball State	W 67–61	16–5 (7–1)	Stroh Center (2,125); Bowling Green, OH
January 31, 2020; 7:00 pm, ESPNU		at Buffalo	W 78–77	17–5 (8–1)	Alumni Arena (5,322); Amherst, NY
February 4, 2020; 7:00 pm, ESPN+		at Central Michigan	L 82–92	17–6 (8–2)	McGuirk Arena (1,805); Mount Pleasant, MI
February 8, 2020; 4:30 pm, ESPN3		Toledo	W 85–83	18–6 (9–2)	Stroh Center (5,000); Bowling Green, OH
February 11, 2020; 7:00 pm, ESPN+		at Akron	L 59–74	18–7 (9–3)	James A. Rhodes Arena (3,128); Akron, OH
February 15, 2020; 1:00 pm, ESPN3		at Ball State	W 77–71	19–7 (10–3)	Worthen Arena (5,492); Muncie, IN
February 22, 2020; 4:30 pm, ESPN3		Ohio	W 62–61	20–7 (11–3)	Stroh Center (3,795); Bowling Green, OH
February 25, 2020; 7:00 pm, ESPN+		Akron	W 78–60	21–7 (12–3)	Stroh Center (2,925); Bowling Green, OH
February 29, 2020; 3:30 pm, ESPN+		at Miami (OH)	L 55–73	21–8 (12–4)	Millett Hall (1,926); Oxford, OH
March 3, 2020; 7:00 pm, ESPN+		at Kent State	L 69–83	21–9 (12–5)	MAC Center (2,875); Kent, OH
March 6, 2020; 7:00 pm, ESPN3		Buffalo	L 84–88	21–10 (12–6)	Stroh Center (3,550); Bowling Green, OH
MAC tournament
March 12, 2020; 6:30 pm, ESPN+	(2)	vs. (7) Toledo; Quarterfinals	MAC Tournament cancelled due to the COVID-19 pandemic		Rocket Mortgage FieldHouse; Cleveland, OH
*Non-conference game. ^{#}Rankings from AP Poll. (#) Tournament seedings in parentheses. All times are in Eastern.
