= Ben Vander Plas =

American basketball player (born 1998)

No. 0 – Twarde Pierniki Toruń
- Position: Power forward
- League: PLK

Personal information
- Born: September 19, 1998 (age 28)
- Listed height: 6 ft 8 in (2.03 m)
- Listed weight: 232 lb (105 kg)

Career information
- High school: Ripon (Ripon, Wisconsin)
- College: Ohio (2018–2022); Virginia (2022–2023)
- NBA draft: 2023: undrafted
- Playing career: 2023–present

Career history
- 2023: MHP Riesen Ludwigsburg
- 2023–2024: Šiauliai
- 2024–2025: Jämtland Basket
- 2025–2026: Dziki Warsaw
- 2026–present: Twarde Pierniki Toruń

Career highlights
- ENBL champion (2026); First-team All-MAC (2022); 2× Third-team All-MAC (2020, 2021); MAC Freshman of the Year (2019); MAC All-Freshman Team (2019); 2× Academic All-American of the Year (2022, 2023); 3× Academic All-American (2021–2023)

Bennett Vander Plas (born September 19, 1998) is an American professional basketball player for Twarde Pierniki Toruń of the Polish Basketball League (PLK). He played college basketball for the Ohio Bobcats and Virginia Cavaliers.

Vander Plas was the Division I Academic All-American of the Year in 2022 and 2023.

== High school career ==
Vander Plas graduated from Ripon High School in Ripon, Wisconsin. Over his playing career he averaged 16 points, 10 rebounds, 3.6 assists, 1.8 blocks and 1.8 steals while playing for his father Dean Vander Plas. He was a three-year team captain and earned First Team All-East Central Conference three times. After both his junior and senior year he earned conference player of the year and first team all-state. As a senior he led Ripon to an undefeated regular season and a state tournament appearance. He played AAU basketball with the Wisconsin Playmakers. He was rated a 2-star recruit by Rivals and committed to Ohio University.

== College career ==
=== Ohio ===
Vander Plas redshirted during the 2017–18 season with a leg injury. He averaged 8.6 points, 6.8 rebounds, and 1.5 assists per game during his freshman season In spite of only starting one game he earned MAC Freshman of the Year honors. He started all 31 games his sophomore year while averaging 15.7 points and 6.9 rebounds a game. He was named All-MAC Third Team for the first time.

He averaged 12.8 points, 5.8 rebounds, and 3.8 assists his junior season and earned All-MAC Third Team for the second straight season. He was named an Academic All-American after the season. He scored 26 points in the MAC tournament semi-final against Toledo and 9 points in the MAC Championship against Buffalo. Ohio upset defending national champion Virginia in the first round of the NCAA tournament. Vander Plas led Ohio with 17 points including 10 straight for the Bobcats near the end of the second half which saw the Bobcats go from down one to ahead by seven.

Vander Plas averaged 14.2 points, 6.8 rebounds, and 3.1 assists for his senior season and notched only the fourth triple double in program history against Central Michigan. He scored a career high 30 points in a home win against Miami. He earned All-MAC First Team honors and was named Division I Academic All-American of the Year by the College Sports Information Directors of America, now known as College Sports Communicators (CSC). After five years at Ohio, Vander Plas had earned a bachelor's degree in communications, a master's degree in sport administration, and a master's degree in management. After the season he entered the transfer portal

=== Virginia ===
On April 23, 2022, Vander Plas announced that he had committed to Virginia. Vander Plas averaged 24.8 minutes, 7.4 points, and 4.6 rebounds starting most regular season games for the ACC co-champion Cavaliers. During a practice prior to Virginia's quarterfinal game of the ACC tournament vs. North Carolina he broke his hand and he missed the entirety of the post season. He repeated as Division I Academic All-American of the Year.

== Professional career ==
=== Riesen Ludwigsburg (2023) ===
On August 4, 2023, he signed with MHP Riesen Ludwigsburg of the Basketball Bundesliga.

=== BC Šiauliai (2023–2024) ===
On November 30, 2023, Vander Plas signed with BC Šiauliai of the Lithuanian Basketball League.

=== Jämtland Basket (2024–2025) ===
On August 14, 2024, Vander Plas signed with Jämtland Basket of the Svenska Basketligan

=== Dziki Warsaw (2025–2026) ===
On July 16, 2025, he signed with Dziki Warsaw of the Polish Basketball League (PLK).

=== Twarde Pierniki Toruń (2026–present) ===
On July 27, 2026, he signed with Twarde Pierniki Toruń of the Polish Basketball League (PLK).

== Personal life ==
He is the son of Ripon High School basketball coach Dean Vander Plas who played with current Virginia head coach Tony Bennett at Wisconsin-Green Bay under Tony's father and then head coach Dick Bennett. Vander Plas is named after the Bennett family.

== Career statistics ==
Legend
GP	Games played	GS	Games started	MPG	Minutes per game
FG%	Field goal percentage	3P%	3-point field goal percentage	FT%	Free throw percentage
RPG	Rebounds per game	APG	Assists per game	SPG	Steals per game
BPG	Blocks per game	PPG	Points per game	**Bold**	Career high

=== College ===
Year	Team	GP	GS	MPG	FG%	3P%	FT%	RPG	APG	SPG	BPG	PPG
2017–18	Ohio	Redshirt										
2018–19	Ohio	31	1	23.2	.407	.309	.707	5.2	1.5	0.9	0.5	8.6
2019–20	Ohio	31	31	33.0	**.492**	.299	.593	**6.9**	2.8	1.0	**0.7**	**15.7**
2020–21	Ohio	25	25	33.8	.432	**.347**	**.764**	5.8	**3.8**	1.4	0.6	12.8
2021–22	Ohio	**35**	**35**	**35.3**	.457	.338	.725	6.8	3.1	**1.8**	0.5	14.3
2022–23	Virginia	29	15	24.8	.412	.303	.509	4.6	1.4	0.8	0.4	7.4
Career		151	107	30.1	.447	.321	.658	5.9	2.5	1.2	0.5	11.8
