= 2019–20 Miami RedHawks men's basketball team =

American college basketball season

2019–20 Miami RedHawks men's basketball
- Conference: Mid-American Conference
- East Division
- Record: 13–19 (5–13 MAC)
- Head coach: Jack Owens (3rd season)
- Assistant coaches: Jeff Rutter; J.R. Reynolds; Kenneth Lowe
- Home arena: Millett Hall

2019–20 Mid-American Conference men's basketball standings
	Conf.				Overall
Team	W		L	PCT	W		L	PCT
East
Akron	14	–	4	.778	24	–	7	.774
Bowling Green	12	–	6	.667	21	–	10	.677
Buffalo	11	–	7	.611	20	–	12	.625
Kent State	9	–	9	.500	20	–	12	.625
Ohio	8	–	10	.444	17	–	15	.531
Miami (OH)	5	–	13	.278	13	–	19	.406
West
Ball State	11	–	7	.611	18	–	13	.581
Northern Illinois	11	–	7	.611	18	–	13	.581
Toledo	8	–	10	.444	17	–	15	.531
Central Michigan	7	–	11	.389	14	–	18	.438
Western Michigan	6	–	12	.333	13	–	19	.406
Eastern Michigan	6	–	12	.333	16	–	16	.500
Note: The 2020 MAC tournament was canceled prior to the quarterfinals due to the COVID-19 pandemic.

The 2019–20 Miami RedHawks men's basketball team represent Miami University in the 2019–20 NCAA Division I men's basketball season. The RedHawks, led by 3rd-year head coach Jack Owens, play their home games at Millett Hall in Oxford, Ohio as members of the East Division of the Mid-American Conference.

== Previous season ==
The RedHawks finished the 2018–19 season 15–17 overall, 7–11 in MAC play to finish in fifth place in the East Division. As the No. 9 seed in the MAC tournament, they were defeated in the first round by Akron.

== Roster ==
2019–20 Miami RedHawks men's basketball team
Players
Coaches

Pos.	#	Name	Height	Weight	Year	Hometown
F	0	Javin Etzler	6 ft 8 in (2.03 m)	189 lb (86 kg)	Fr	Convoy, Ohio
G	1	Nike Sibande	6 ft 4 in (1.93 m)	183 lb (83 kg)	Jr	Indianapolis, Indiana
G	2	Mekhi Lairy	5 ft 8 in (1.73 m)	140 lb (64 kg)	So	Evansville, Indiana
G	3	Dae Dae Grant	6 ft 2 in (1.88 m)	180 lb (82 kg)	Fr	Lorain, Ohio
G	4	Isaiah Coleman-Lands	6 ft 0 in (1.83 m)	168 lb (76 kg)	RS So	Indianapolis, Indiana
F	5	Precious Ayah	6 ft 6 in (1.98 m)	225 lb (102 kg)	RS Jr	Bayelsa State, Nigeria
G	11	Myja White	6 ft 1 in (1.85 m)	188 lb (85 kg)	RS Fr	Terre Haute, Indiana
F	13	Dalonte Brown	6 ft 7 in (2.01 m)	200 lb (91 kg)	Jr	Toledo, Ohio
F	14	Bam Bowman	6 ft 8 in (2.03 m)	273 lb (124 kg)	Sr	Bowling Green, Kentucky
G	15	Milos Jovic	6 ft 4 in (1.93 m)	198 lb (90 kg)	RS Jr	Leskovac, Serbia
G	20	Benjamin Litteken	6 ft 1 in (1.85 m)	190 lb (86 kg)	Jr	St. Louis, Missouri
F	22	Elijah McNamara	6 ft 9 in (2.06 m)	207 lb (94 kg)	So	Pickerington, Ohio
F	24	Michael Ritchie	6 ft 5 in (1.96 m)	193 lb (88 kg)	Jr	Mount Prospect, Illinois
F	33	James Beck	6 ft 8 in (2.03 m)	210 lb (95 kg)	Jr	Grand Rapids, Michigan
F	35	Josh Brewer	6 ft 5 in (1.96 m)	185 lb (84 kg)	So	Indianapolis, Indiana

Head coach

- Jack Owens (Eastern Illinois)

Assistant coach(es)

- Jeff Rutter (Winona State)
- J.R. Reynolds (Eastern Illinois)
- Kenneth Lowe (Purdue)

Legend

- (C) Team captain
- (S) Suspended
- (I) Ineligible
- (W) Walk-on
- Injured
- Current redshirt

Roster
Last update: November 24, 2019

== Schedule and results ==
Date time, TV	Rank^{#}	Opponent^{#}	Result	Record	Site (attendance) city, state
Exhibition
November 4, 2019*; 7:00 pm		Shawnee State	W 82–68		Millett Hall; Oxford, OH
Non-conference regular season
November 9, 2019*; 2:00 pm, ESPN3		Wright State	L 81–88	0–1	Millett Hall (2,034); Oxford, OH
November 13, 2019*; 7:00 pm, YouTube		at Purdue Fort Wayne	W 84–80	1–1	Gates Sports Center (1,355); Fort Wayne, IN
November 16, 2019*; 12:00 pm, ESPN3		Alabama A&M	W 79–63	2–1	Millett Hall (1,480); Oxford, OH
November 20, 2019*; 12:00 pm, ESPN+		Central State	W 80–45	3–1	Millett Hall (1,013); Oxford, OH
November 25, 2019*; 1:30 pm, FloHoops		vs. Drake; Gulf Coast Showcase	W 67-59	4–1	Hertz Arena (563); Estero, FL
November 26, 2019*; 5:00 pm, FloHoops		vs. South Alabama; Gulf Coast Showcase Semifinals	L 71-82	4–2	Hertz Arena (578); Estero, FL
November 27, 2019*; 5:00 pm, FloHoops		vs. Wright State; Gulf Coast Showcase 3rd Place Game	L 66–71	4–3	Hertz Arena (712); Estero, FL
December 3, 2019*; 7:00 pm, ESPN+		Northern Kentucky	L 54–76	4–4	Millett Hall (1,588); Oxford, OH
December 7, 2019*; 2:00 pm, ESPN+		at Evansville	L 87–101	4–5	Ford Center (5,264); Evansville, IN
December 15, 2019*; 4:00 pm, ESPN3		Mississippi Valley State	W 79–67	5–5	Millett Hall (981); Oxford, OH
December 18, 2019*; 8:30 pm, ACCN		at No. 3 Louisville	L 46–70	5–6	KFC Yum! Center (15,444); Louisville, KY
December 21, 2019*; 2:00 pm, ESPN+		Bradley	W 71–55	6–6	Millett Hall (1,011); Oxford, OH
December 30, 2019*; 2:00 pm, ESPN+		Wilberforce	W 119–52	7–6	Millett Hall (1,912); Oxford, OH
MAC regular season
January 4, 2020; 2:00 pm, ESPN+		at Central Michigan	L 82–93	7–7 (0–1)	McGuirk Arena (1,732); Mount Pleasant, MI
January 7, 2020; 7:00 pm, ESPN+		at Bowling Green	L 76–78	7–8 (0–2)	Stroh Center (1,923); Bowling Green, OH
January 10, 2020; 7:00 pm, CBSSN		Buffalo	L 78–83	7–9 (0–3)	Millett Hall (1,056); Oxford, OH
January 14, 2020; 7:00 pm, ESPN+		Kent State	W 77–74	8–9 (1–3)	Millett Hall (784); Oxford, OH
January 18, 2020; 1:00 pm, ESPN+		at Ball State	L 62–71	8–10 (1–4)	Worthen Arena (62–71); Muncie, IN
January 21, 2020; 7:00 pm, ESPN+		Akron	L 60–81	8–11 (1–5)	Millett Hall (988); Oxford, OH
January 25, 2020; 2:00 pm, ESPN+		Eastern Michigan	W 73–68	9–11 (2–5)	Millett Hall (1,144); Oxford, OH
January 28, 2020; 7:00 pm, ESPN+		Central Michigan	Postponed, rescheduled for February 27		Millett Hall; Oxford, OH
February 1, 2020; 4:00 pm, CBSSN		at Northern Illinois	L 55–70	9–12 (2–6)	Convocation Center (1,492); DeKalb, IL
February 4, 2020; 7:00 pm, ESPN+		Western Michigan	L 60–64	9–13 (2–7)	Millett Hall (1,245); Oxford, OH
February 8, 2020; 3:30 pm, ESPN3		at Ohio	L 46–77	9–14 (2–8)	Convocation Center (6,534); Athens, OH
February 11, 2020; 7:00 pm, ESPN+		at Toledo	L 57–65	9–15 (2–9)	Savage Arena (3,817); Toledo, OH
February 15, 2020; 3:30 pm, ESPN3		Northern Illinois	W 65–60	10–15 (3–9)	Millett Hall (3,831); Oxford, OH
February 22, 2020; 7:00 pm, ESPN3		at Akron	L 65–75	10–16 (3–10)	James A. Rhodes Arena (4,405); Akron, OH
February 25, 2020; 7:00 pm, ESPN+		at Kent State	L 51–64	10–17 (3–11)	MAC Center (2,180); Kent, OH
February 27, 2020; 7:00 pm, ESPN+		Central Michigan	W 76–57	11–17 (4–11)	Millett Hall (836); Oxford, OH
February 29, 2020; 3:30 pm, ESPN+		Bowling Green	W 73–55	12–17 (5–11)	Millett Hall (1,926); Oxford, OH
March 3, 2020; 7:00 pm, ESPN+		at Buffalo	L 69–75	12–18 (5–12)	Alumni Arena (3,252); Amherst, NY
March 6, 2020; 7:00 pm, ESPN3		Ohio	L 65–67	12–19 (5–13)	Millett Hall (2,289); Oxford, OH
MAC tournament
March 9, 2020; 7:30 pm, ESPN+	(12)	at (5) Buffalo; First round	W 85–79	13–19	Alumni Arena (3,741); Amherst, NY
March 12, 2020; 7:00 pm, ESPN+	(12)	vs. (4) Northern Illinois; Quarterfinals	MAC Tournament cancelled due to the COVID-19 pandemic		Rocket Mortgage FieldHouse; Cleveland, OH
*Non-conference game. ^{#}Rankings from AP Poll. (#) Tournament seedings in parentheses. All times are in Eastern.
