= 2019–20 Kent State Golden Flashes men's basketball team =

American college basketball season

2019–20 Kent State Golden Flashes men's basketball
- Conference: Mid-American Conference
- East Division
- Record: 20–12 (9–9 MAC)
- Head coach: Rob Senderoff (9th season)
- Assistant coaches: Aaron Fuss; Matt Sligh; Julian Sullinger
- Home arena: MAC Center

2019–20 Mid-American Conference men's basketball standings
	Conf.				Overall
Team	W		L	PCT	W		L	PCT
East
Akron	14	–	4	.778	24	–	7	.774
Bowling Green	12	–	6	.667	21	–	10	.677
Buffalo	11	–	7	.611	20	–	12	.625
Kent State	9	–	9	.500	20	–	12	.625
Ohio	8	–	10	.444	17	–	15	.531
Miami (OH)	5	–	13	.278	13	–	19	.406
West
Ball State	11	–	7	.611	18	–	13	.581
Northern Illinois	11	–	7	.611	18	–	13	.581
Toledo	8	–	10	.444	17	–	15	.531
Central Michigan	7	–	11	.389	14	–	18	.438
Western Michigan	6	–	12	.333	13	–	19	.406
Eastern Michigan	6	–	12	.333	16	–	16	.500
Note: The 2020 MAC tournament was canceled prior to the quarterfinals due to the COVID-19 pandemic.

The 2019–20 Kent State Golden Flashes men's basketball team represented Kent State University in the 2019–20 NCAA Division I men's basketball season. The Golden Flashes, led by 9th-year head coach Rob Senderoff, played their home games at the Memorial Athletic and Convocation Center, also known as the MAC Center, in Kent, Ohio as members of the East Division of the Mid-American Conference (MAC).

The Golden Flashes finished the season 20–12 overall, 9–9 in MAC play, to finish fourth place in the East Division. They defeated Eastern Michigan in the first round of the MAC tournament before the rest of the tournament was cancelled due to the COVID-19 pandemic.

== Previous season ==
The Golden Flashes finished the 2018–19 season 22–11 overall, 11–7 in MAC play, to finish third place in the East Division. As the No. 4 seed in the MAC tournament, they were defeated by Central Michigan in the quarterfinals. They were invited to the CIT, where they were defeated by Louisiana–Monroe in the first round.

== Roster ==
2019–20 Kent State Golden Flashes men's basketball team
Players
Coaches

Pos.	#	Name	Height	Weight	Year	Hometown
F	0	Jon King	6 ft 5 in (1.96 m)	195 lb (88 kg)	Fr	Akron, OH
G	1	CJ Williamson	6 ft 6 in (1.98 m)	200 lb (91 kg)	Sr	Orlando, FL
G	2	Mike Nuga (redshirt)	6 ft 2 in (1.88 m)	180 lb (82 kg)	Sr	Toronto, ON
G	3	Troy Simons	6 ft 3 in (1.91 m)	195 lb (88 kg)	Sr	Pittsburgh, PA
G	4	Antonio Williams	6 ft 0 in (1.83 m)	185 lb (84 kg)	Sr	Chicago, IL
F	5	Danny Pippen	6 ft 9 in (2.06 m)	222 lb (101 kg)	RS Jr	Detroit, MI
G	11	Giovanni Santiago	6 ft 1 in (1.85 m)	155 lb (70 kg)	Fr	Bayamón, Puerto Rico
G	13	Mitch Peterson	6 ft 5 in (1.96 m)	199 lb (90 kg)	Sr	Richfield, OH
F	14	Tervell Beck	6 ft 7 in (2.01 m)	230 lb (104 kg)	Jr	Cleveland, OH
G	15	Anthony Roberts	6 ft 4 in (1.93 m)	190 lb (86 kg)	So	Detroit, MI
G	21	Sentwali Nalls	6 ft 1 in (1.85 m)	165 lb (75 kg)	Fr	Chicago, IL
F	22	Anyeuri Castillo	6 ft 7 in (2.01 m)	195 lb (88 kg)	Jr	Santo Domingo, Dominican Republic
F	23	Evan Bainbridge	6 ft 9 in (2.06 m)	205 lb (93 kg)	Fr	Stow, OH
F	25	Philip Whittington	6 ft 8 in (2.03 m)	227 lb (103 kg)	Sr	Los Angeles, CA
G	33	Jeremiah Hernandez (redshirt)	6 ft 4 in (1.93 m)	175 lb (79 kg)	Fr	Chicago, IL
C	50	Kalin Bennett	6 ft 11 in (2.11 m)	300 lb (136 kg)	Fr	Little Rock, AR

Head coach

- Rob Senderoff (Albany/Miami (FL))

Assistant coach(es)

- Aaron Fuss (Ohio State)
- Matt Sligh (Northwest Missouri State)
- Julian Sullinger (Kent State)

Legend

- (C) Team captain
- (S) Suspended
- (I) Ineligible
- (W) Walk-on
- Injured
- Current redshirt

Roster
Last update: November 23, 2019

== Schedule and results ==
Date time, TV	Rank^{#}	Opponent^{#}	Result	Record	Site (attendance) city, state
Non-conference regular season
November 6, 2019*; 7:00 p.m., ESPN3		Hiram	W 97–58	1–0	MAC Center; Kent, OH
November 11, 2019*; 7:00 p.m.		at Towson	W 84–80	2–0	SECU Arena (1,823); Towson, MD
November 16, 2019*; 7:00 p.m., ESPN3		at Wright State	W 72–71	3–0	Nutter Center (4,216); Fairborn, OH
November 19, 2019*; 7:00 p.m., ESPN+		Purdue Fort Wayne	W 75–68	4–0	MAC Center (2,125); Kent, OH
November 21, 2019*; 5:00 p.m.		Concord	W 89–59	5–0	MAC Center (2,245); Kent, OH
November 25, 2019*; 6:30 p.m., Big Ten Network		at No. 10 Ohio State	L 52–71	5–1	St. John Arena (8,850); Columbus, OH
November 30, 2019*; 4:00 p.m., ESPN+		Stetson	W 77–53	6–1	MAC Center (1,454); Kent, OH
December 3, 2019*; 7:00 p.m., ESPN+		Detroit Mercy	W 92–57	7–1	MAC Center (2,030); Kent, OH
December 7, 2019*; 7:00 p.m., ESPN+		Cleveland State	W 81–59	8–1	MAC Center (2,176); Kent, OH
December 16, 2019*; 4:00 p.m.		vs. UC Irvine; Sun Bowl Invitational semifinals	L 68–74	8–2	Don Haskins Center (5,969); El Paso, TX
December 17, 2019*; 7:00 p.m.		vs. North Carolina A&T; Sun Bowl Invitational 3rd-place game	W 85–71 ^{OT}	9–2	Don Haskins Center (6,934); El Paso, TX
December 21, 2019*; 7:00 p.m., ESPN3		Hampton	W 103–64	10–2	MAC Center (1,937); Kent, OH
December 30, 2019*; 7:00 p.m., SECN+		at Mississippi State	L 68–96	10–3	Humphrey Coliseum (6,515); Starkville, MS
MAC regular season
January 3, 2020; 9:00 p.m., CBSSN		at Bowling Green	W 79–61	11–3 (1–0)	Stroh Center (2,022); Bowling Green, OH
January 7, 2020; 7:00 p.m., ESPN+		Toledo	W 84–77	12–3 (2–0)	MAC Center (2,234); Kent, OH
January 11, 2020; 3:30 p.m., ESPN3		Central Michigan	W 79–73	13–3 (3–0)	MAC Center (3,164); Kent, OH
January 14, 2020; 7:00 p.m., ESPN+		at Miami (OH)	L 74–77	13–4 (3–1)	Millett Hall (784); Oxford, OH
January 18, 2020; 4:00 p.m., ESPN3		at Western Michigan	L 63–67	13–5 (3–2)	University Arena (2,110); Kalamazoo, MI
January 21, 2020; 7:00 p.m., ESPN+		Northern Illinois	L 69–76	13–6 (3–3)	MAC Center (2,211); Kent, OH
January 24, 2020; 6:30 p.m., CBSSN		at Buffalo	W 70–66	14–6 (4–3)	Alumni Arena (3,554); Amherst, NY
January 28, 2020; 7:00 p.m., ESPN+		at Toledo	W 83–70	15–6 (5–3)	Savage Arena (4,033); Toledo, OH
January 31, 2020; 6:30 p.m., CBSSN		Akron	W 68–67	16–6 (6–3)	MAC Center (6,339); Kent, OH
February 4, 2020; 7:00 p.m., ESPN+		Ball State	L 54–62	16–7 (6–4)	MAC Center (2,025); Kent, OH
February 7, 2020; 7:00 p.m., CBSSN		at Northern Illinois	L 54–57	16–8 (6–5)	Convocation Center (1,385); DeKalb, IL
February 15, 2020; 1:00 p.m., ESPN3		Ohio	W 87–72	17–8 (7–5)	MAC Center (5,218); Kent, OH
February 18, 2020; 7:00 p.m., ESPN+		at Eastern Michigan	L 49–70	17–9 (7–6)	Convocation Center (1,196); Ypsilanti, MI
February 22, 2020; 3:30 p.m., ESPN3		Buffalo	L 98–104 ^{2OT}	17–10 (7–7)	MAC Center (3,005); Kent, OH
February 25, 2020; 7:00 p.m., ESPN+		Miami (OH)	W 74–61	18–10 (8–7)	MAC Center (2,180); Kent, OH
February 28, 2020; 6:30 p.m., CBSSN		at Ohio	L 69–76	18–11 (8–8)	Convocation Center (5,490); Athens, OH
March 3, 2020; 7:00 p.m., ESPN+		Bowling Green	W 83–69	19–11 (9–8)	MAC Center (2,875); Kent, OH
March 6, 2020; 7:00 p.m., CBSSN		at Akron	L 76–79	19–12 (9–9)	James A. Rhodes Arena (5,500); Akron, OH
MAC tournament
March 9, 2020; 7:00 p.m., ESPN+	(6)	(11) Eastern Michigan; First round	W 86–76	20–12	MAC Center (2,005); Kent, OH
March 12, 2020; 9:00 p.m., ESPN+	(6)	vs. (3) Ball State; Quarterfinals	MAC tournament cancelled due to the COVID-19 pandemic		Rocket Mortgage FieldHouse; Cleveland, OH
*Non-conference game. ^{#}Rankings from AP poll. (#) Tournament seedings in parentheses. All times are in Eastern.
