= 2019–20 Northern Illinois Huskies men's basketball team =

American college basketball season

2019–20 Northern Illinois Huskies men's basketball

MAC West Division co-champions
- Conference: Mid-American Conference
- West Division
- Record: 18–13 (11–7 MAC)
- Head coach: Mark Montgomery (9th season)
- Associate head coach: Lamar Chapman
- Assistant coaches: Brandon Watkins; Anthony Beane Sr.
- Home arena: Convocation Center

2019–20 Mid-American Conference men's basketball standings
	Conf.				Overall
Team	W		L	PCT	W		L	PCT
East
Akron	14	–	4	.778	24	–	7	.774
Bowling Green	12	–	6	.667	21	–	10	.677
Buffalo	11	–	7	.611	20	–	12	.625
Kent State	9	–	9	.500	20	–	12	.625
Ohio	8	–	10	.444	17	–	15	.531
Miami (OH)	5	–	13	.278	13	–	19	.406
West
Ball State	11	–	7	.611	18	–	13	.581
Northern Illinois	11	–	7	.611	18	–	13	.581
Toledo	8	–	10	.444	17	–	15	.531
Central Michigan	7	–	11	.389	14	–	18	.438
Western Michigan	6	–	12	.333	13	–	19	.406
Eastern Michigan	6	–	12	.333	16	–	16	.500
Note: The 2020 MAC tournament was canceled prior to the quarterfinals due to the COVID-19 pandemic.

The 2019–20 Northern Illinois Huskies men's basketball team represent Northern Illinois University in the 2019–20 NCAA Division I men's basketball season. The Huskies, led by 9th-year head coach Mark Montgomery, play their home games at the Convocation Center in DeKalb, Illinois as members of the West Division of the Mid-American Conference.

== Previous season ==
The Huskies finished the 2018–19 season 17–17 overall, 8–10 in MAC play to finish in fourth place in the West Division. As the No. 7 seed in the MAC tournament, they defeated Ohio in the first round, upset Toledo in the quarterfinals, before falling to Bowling Green in the semifinals.

== Roster ==
2019–20 Northern Illinois Huskies men's basketball team
Players
Coaches

Pos.	#	Name	Height	Weight	Year	Previous school	Hometown
F	0	Chris Johnson	6 ft 7 in (2.01 m)	215 lb (98 kg)	Jr	Thornton Fractional North; South Suburban College	Chicago, Illinois
G	1	Trendon Hankerson	6 ft 2 in (1.88 m)	185 lb (84 kg)	So	Novi	Novi, Michigan
G	2	Gairges Daow	6 ft 4 in (1.93 m)	190 lb (86 kg)	Jr	Victory Rock Academy	Melbourne, Australia
G/F	3	Justin Lee	6 ft 8 in (2.03 m)	210 lb (95 kg)	So	Collins Hill	Lawrenceville, Georgia
F	4	Lacey James	6 ft 9 in (2.06 m)	240 lb (109 kg)	RS Sr	Wayland Union; Rider	Grand Rapids, Michigan
G	5	Zaire Mateen	6 ft 0 in (1.83 m)	170 lb (77 kg)	Jr	South Shore; Laramie County CC	Queens, New York
G	10	Eugene German	6 ft 0 in (1.83 m)	185 lb (84 kg)	Sr	21st Century Charter	Gary, Indiana
F	11	Noah McCarty	6 ft 8 in (2.03 m)	240 lb (109 kg)	Sr	Sterling Newman	Rock Falls, Illinois
G	21	Alize Travis	6 ft 0 in (1.83 m)	170 lb (77 kg)	Sr	Eastvale Roosevelt; Pima CC	Victorville, California
G	22	Rod Henry-Hayes	6 ft 4 in (1.93 m)	185 lb (84 kg)	Jr	Zion-Benton Township	Zion, Illinois
G	23	Tyler Cochran	6 ft 2 in (1.88 m)	220 lb (100 kg)	Fr	Bolingbrook	Bolingbrook, Illinois
G	24	Darius Beane	6 ft 3 in (1.91 m)	175 lb (79 kg)	So	Carbondale; Southern Illinois	Carbondale, Illinois
F	25	Nathan Scott	6 ft 8 in (2.03 m)	195 lb (88 kg)	Jr	Neuqua Valley; Olney Central College	Naperville, Illinois
F	32	Keenon Cole	6 ft 7 in (2.01 m)	200 lb (91 kg)	Fr	Streamwood	Streamwood, Illinois
G	55	Daniel Filippone	6 ft 1 in (1.85 m)	175 lb (79 kg)	Fr	Antioch Community	Antioch, Illinois

Head coach

- Mark Montgomery (Michigan State)

Assistant coach(es)

- Lamar Chapman (Lane College)
- Brandon Watkins (Penn State)
- Anthony Beane Sr. (Kansas State)

Legend

- (C) Team captain
- (S) Suspended
- (I) Ineligible
- (W) Walk-on
- Injured
- Current redshirt

Roster
Last update: January 19, 2020

== Schedule and results ==
Date time, TV	Rank^{#}	Opponent^{#}	Result	Record	Site (attendance) city, state
Exhibition
November 5, 2019*; 7:00 pm		Roosevelt	W 85–50		Convocation Center (422); DeKalb, IL
Non-conference regular season
November 9, 2019*; 3:00 pm, ESPN3		Northern Iowa	L 54–64	0–1	Convocation Center (1,003); DeKalb, IL
November 12, 2019*; 7:00 pm, Cyclones.TV		at Iowa State	L 52–70	0–2	Hilton Coliseum (13,762); Ames, IA
November 15, 2019*; 6:00 pm, ESPN3		Coppin State; Collegiate Hoops Roadshow	W 81–69	1–2	Convocation Center (695); DeKalb, IL
November 16, 2019*; 3:00 pm		Rockford; Collegiate Hoops Roadshow	W 96–48	2–2	Convocation Center (729); DeKalb, IL
November 18, 2019*; 7:00 pm, ESPN+		Longwood; Collegiate Hoops Roadshow	W 65–48	3–2	Convocation Center (601); DeKalb, IL
November 20, 2019*; 7:30 pm		at Western Illinois	W 86–81	4–2	Western Hall (684); Macomb, IL
November 23, 2019*; 2:00 pm, ESPN+		at SIU Edwardsville; Collegiate Hoops Roadshow	W 68–64	5–2	Vadalabene Center (627); Edwardsville, IL
November 25, 2019*; 7:00 pm, ESPN+		Oakland	W 74–50	6–2	Convocation Center (730); DeKalb, IL
December 5, 2019*; 9:00 pm, WCC Network		at Saint Mary's	L 49–61	6–3	University Credit Union Pavilion (2,816); Moraga, CA
December 7, 2019*; 7:00 pm, BigWest.TV		at UC Davis	L 57–66	6–4	The Pavilion (949); Davis, CA
December 16, 2019*; 6:00 pm, ACCN		at Pittsburgh	L 50–59	6–5	Petersen Events Center (7,015); Pittsburgh, PA
December 19, 2019*; 7:30 pm, WAC DN		at Chicago State	W 75–60	7–5	Jones Convocation Center (255); Chicago, IL
December 21, 2019*; 1:00 pm, ESPN+		Green Bay	L 84–85	7–6	Convocation Center (1,123); DeKalb, IL
MAC regular season
January 4, 2020; 1:00 pm, ESPN+		at Buffalo	W 73–72	8–6 (1–0)	Alumni Arena (3,069); Buffalo, NY
January 7, 2020; 6:00 pm, ESPN+		at Central Michigan	L 67–68	8–7 (1–1)	McGuirk Arena (1,519); Mount Pleasant, MI
January 11, 2020; 3:30 pm, ESPN3		Eastern Michigan	W 71–68	9–7 (2–1)	Convocation Center (1,074); DeKalb, IL
January 14, 2020; 7:00 pm, ESPN+		Akron	L 49–72	9–8 (2–2)	Convocation Center (884); DeKalb, IL
January 18, 2020; 3:00 pm, ESPN+		at Bowling Green	L 64–66	9–9 (2–3)	Stroh Center (1,925); Bowling Green, OH
January 21, 2020; 6:00 pm, ESPN+		at Kent State	W 76–69	10–9 (3–3)	MAC Center (2,211); Kent, OH
January 25, 2020; 3:00 pm, ESPN3		Western Michigan	W 58–52	11–9 (4–3)	Convocation Center (1,030); DeKalb, IL
January 28, 2020; 7:00 pm, ESPN+		Ohio	W 61–59	12–9 (5–3)	Convocation Center (783); DeKalb, IL
February 1, 2020; 3:00 pm, CBSSN		Miami (OH)	W 70–55	13–9 (6–3)	Convocation Center (1,492); DeKalb, IL
February 4, 2020; 6:00 pm, ESPN+		at Toledo	W 66–61	14–9 (7–3)	Savage Arena (3,877); Toledo, OH
February 7, 2020; 6:00 pm, CBSSN		Kent State	W 57–54	15–9 (8–3)	Convocation Center (1,385); DeKalb, IL
February 11, 2020; 6:00 pm, ESPN+		at Ball State	L 59–63	15–10 (8–4)	Worthen Arena (4,288); Muncie, IN
February 15, 2020; 2:30 pm, ESPN3		at Miami (OH)	L 60–65	15–11 (8–5)	Millett Hall (3,831); Oxford, OH
February 22, 2020; 3:30 pm, ESPN+		Central Michigan	W 82–81 ^{OT}	16–11 (9–5)	Convocation Center (3,016); DeKalb, IL
February 25, 2020; 6:00 pm, ESPN+		at Eastern Michigan	W 73–71	17–11 (10–5)	Convocation Center (1,378); Ypsilanti, MI
February 29, 2020; 3:00 pm, ESPN+		at Western Michigan	L 69–72	17–12 (10–6)	University Arena (2,488); Kalamazoo, MI
March 3, 2020; 7:00 pm, ESPN+		Toledo	W 71–50	18–12 (11–6)	Convocation Center (1,019); DeKalb, IL
March 6, 2020; 7:00 pm, ESPN3		Ball State	L 54–75	18–13 (11–7)	Convocation Center (1,749); DeKalb, IL
MAC tournament
March 12, 2020; 1:30 pm, ESPN+	(4)	vs. (12) Miami (OH); Quarterfinals	MAC Tournament cancelled due to the COVID-19 pandemic		Rocket Mortgage FieldHouse; Cleveland, OH
*Non-conference game. ^{#}Rankings from AP Poll. (#) Tournament seedings in parentheses. All times are in Central.
