= 2019–20 Buffalo Bulls men's basketball team =

American college basketball season

2019–20 Buffalo Bulls men's basketball
- Conference: Mid-American Conference
- East Division
- Record: 20–12 (11–7 MAC)
- Head coach: Jim Whitesell (1st season)
- Assistant coaches: Jamie Quarles (3rd season); Angres Thorpe (1st season); Hunter Jenkins (1st season)
- Home arena: Alumni Arena

2019–20 Mid-American Conference men's basketball standings
	Conf.				Overall
Team	W		L	PCT	W		L	PCT
East
Akron	14	–	4	.778	24	–	7	.774
Bowling Green	12	–	6	.667	21	–	10	.677
Buffalo	11	–	7	.611	20	–	12	.625
Kent State	9	–	9	.500	20	–	12	.625
Ohio	8	–	10	.444	17	–	15	.531
Miami (OH)	5	–	13	.278	13	–	19	.406
West
Ball State	11	–	7	.611	18	–	13	.581
Northern Illinois	11	–	7	.611	18	–	13	.581
Toledo	8	–	10	.444	17	–	15	.531
Central Michigan	7	–	11	.389	14	–	18	.438
Western Michigan	6	–	12	.333	13	–	19	.406
Eastern Michigan	6	–	12	.333	16	–	16	.500
Note: The 2020 MAC tournament was canceled prior to the quarterfinals due to the COVID-19 pandemic.

The 2019–20 Buffalo Bulls men's basketball team represented the University at Buffalo during the 2019–20 NCAA Division I men's basketball season. The Bulls, led by first-year head coach Jim Whitesell, played their home games at Alumni Arena in Amherst, New York as members of the East Division of the Mid-American Conference.

== Previous season ==
During the 2018–19 season, The Bulls posted a school-record 32 wins, including an NCAA tournament victory over former head coach Bobby Hurley and Arizona State. Their season, which to that point was punctuated by a 13-game winning streak and MAC conference titles (regular and post-season), ended in a 78–58 loss to Texas Tech in the second round. At season's end, Oats departed to become head coach at Alabama despite signing an extension with Buffalo a week earlier.

=== 2019 recruiting class ===
College recruiting information
Name	Hometown	School	Height	Weight	Commit date
David Skogman; C	Waukesha, WI	Waukesha West	6 ft 10 in (2.08 m)	210 lb (95 kg)	May 2, 2019
David Skogman; C	Recruit ratings: Scout: Rivals: 247Sports: ESPN:				
Savion Gallion; SG	Washington, DC	Mt. Zion Preparatory School	6 ft 4 in (1.93 m)	186 lb (84 kg)	May 8, 2019
Savion Gallion; SG	Recruit ratings: No ratings found				
Overall recruit ranking:
Note: In many cases, Scout, Rivals, 247Sports, On3, and ESPN may conflict in their listings of height and weight.; In these cases, the average was taken. ESPN grades are on a 100-point scale.; Sources: "2019 Buffalo Bulls commits". Rivals.; "2019 Team Ranking". Rivals.

== Roster ==
2019–20 Buffalo Bulls men's basketball team
Players
Coaches

Pos.	#	Name	Height	Weight	Year	Previous school	Hometown
G/F	0	David Nickelberry	6 ft 7 in (2.01 m)	210 lb (95 kg)	Jr	Windermere Prep; Trinity Valley Community College	Orlando, FL
F	1	Gabe Grant	6 ft 6 in (1.98 m)	226 lb (103 kg)	Sr	Mount Carmel HS; Houston Cougars	Chicago, IL
G	2	Antwain Johnson	6 ft 2 in (1.88 m)	202 lb (92 kg)	Sr	Malone High School	Greenwood, FL
G	3	Jayvon Graves	6 ft 3 in (1.91 m)	200 lb (91 kg)	Jr	St. Vincent-St. Mary High School	Malvern, Ohio
G	4	Davonta Jordan	6 ft 2 in (1.88 m)	190 lb (86 kg)	Sr	Montverde Academy	Cocoa, FL
G	5	Savion Gallion	6 ft 4 in (1.93 m)	185 lb (84 kg)	Fr	Mount Zion Preparatory	Washington, DC
G	10	Ronaldo Segu	6 ft 0 in (1.83 m)	160 lb (73 kg)	So	Orlando Christian Prep	Orlando, FL
F	11	Jeenathan Williams	6 ft 5 in (1.96 m)	200 lb (91 kg)	So	Prolific Prep	Rochester, NY
G	20	Patrick Moore	6 ft 3 in (1.91 m)	210 lb (95 kg)	Sr	Fredonia High School; Cortland Red Dragons	Fredonia, NY
F	21	Dominic Johnson	6 ft 5 in (1.96 m)	230 lb (104 kg)	Jr	Catholic Central	Windsor, ON
G	22	Laquill Hardnett	6 ft 8 in (2.03 m)	200 lb (91 kg)	RS Fr	Perry Hall High School; Cincinnati Bearcats	Philadelphia, PA
G	23	Jamon Bivens	6 ft 3 in (1.91 m)	190 lb (86 kg)	Jr	Fayette County HS	Atlanta, GA
F	24	Tra'von Fagan	6 ft 8 in (2.03 m)	197 lb (89 kg)	Jr	Cedar Falls; Florida SouthWestern State	Waterloo, IA
F	31	Giambattista Davis	6 ft 3 in (1.91 m)	216 lb (98 kg)	Sr	The Park School of Buffalo; Daemen Wildcats	Buffalo, NY
F	34	Josh Mballa	6 ft 7 in (2.01 m)	217 lb (98 kg)	So	Putnam Science Academy; Texas Tech Red Raiders	Paris, France
C	41	Brock Bertram	6 ft 11 in (2.11 m)	247 lb (112 kg)	Jr	Apple Valley	Apple Valley, MN
C	42	David Skogman	6 ft 10 in (2.08 m)	221 lb (100 kg)	Fr	Waukesha West High School	Waukesha, Wisconsin

Head coach

- Jim Whitesell (Luther)

Assistant coach(es)

- Jamie Quarles (Augusta University)
- Angres Thorpe (St. Leo University)
- Hunter Jenkins (Louisiana Tech University)

Legend

- (C) Team captain
- (S) Suspended
- (I) Ineligible
- (W) Walk-on
- Injured
- Current redshirt

Roster
Last update: 15 November 2019

== Schedule and results ==
Date time, TV	Rank^{#}	Opponent^{#}	Result	Record	High points	High rebounds	High assists	Site (attendance) city, state
Exhibition
October 24, 2019*; 7:00 pm		Daemen	W 111–73		19 – Grant	6 – Grant	14 – Segu	Alumni Arena (2,562); Amherst, NY
Non-conference regular season
November 8, 2019*; 7:00 pm, ESPN+		Dartmouth	L 63–68	0–1	17 – Jordan	9 – Mballa	3 – Tied	Alumni Arena (3,376); Amherst, NY
November 11, 2019*; 7:00 pm, ESPN3		Nazareth	W 109–72	1–1	17 – Tied	9 – Mballa	6 – Segu	Alumni Arena (1,913); Amherst, NY
November 16, 2019*; 2:30 pm, ESPN+		vs. Harvard; James Naismith Memorial Classic	W 88–76	2–1	21 – Segu	8 – Williams	7 – Jordan	Scotiabank Arena; Toronto, ON
November 21, 2019*; 9:00 pm, ESPNU		vs. UConn; Charleston Classic quarterfinals	L 68–79	2–2	15 – Tied	8 – Tied	5 – Jordan	TD Arena (4,003); Charleston, SC
November 22, 2019*; 7:00 pm, ESPNU		vs. Towson; Charleston Classic consolation 2nd round	W 76–73	3–2	25 – Graves	11 – Mballa	11 – Jordan	TD Arena (4,416); Charleston, SC
November 24, 2019*; 3:30 pm, ESPNU		vs. Missouri State; Charleston Classic 5th place game	W 75–74	4–2	23 – Jordan	5 – Tied	5 – Jordan	TD Arena (3,122); Charleston, SC
November 30, 2019*; 2:00 pm, ESPN3		William & Mary	W 88–77	5–2	24 – Graves	8 – Mballa	5 – Graves	Alumni Arena (3,420); Amherst, NY
December 3, 2019*; 8:00 pm, SECN+		at Vanderbilt	L 76–90	5–3	16 – Johnson	7 – Tied	3 – Graves	Memorial Gymnasium (8,489); Nashville, TN
December 8, 2019*; 5:00 pm, FS1		at DePaul	W 74–69	6–3	21 – Graves	14 – Mballa	8 – Jordan	Wintrust Arena (4,419); Chicago, IL
December 14, 2019*; 2:00 pm, ESPN+		Army	L 76–89	6–4	18 – Johnson	8 – Jordan	8 – Jordan	Alumni Arena (3,693); Amherst, NY
December 18, 2019*; 7:00 pm, ESPN+		Canisius	W 82–73	7–4	26 – Jordan	11 – Hardnett	5 – Graves	Alumni Arena (3,269); Amherst, NY
December 21, 2019*; 2:00 pm, ESPN3		Niagara	W 92–72	8–4	22 – Graves	10 – Williams	8 – Jordan	Alumni Arena (2,644); Amherst, NY
December 30, 2019*; 7:00 pm, ESPN+		St. Bonaventure	W 84–79	9–4	28 – Graves	15 – Mballa	5 – Jordan	Alumni Arena (6,003); Amherst, NY
MAC regular season
January 4, 2020; 2:00 pm, ESPN+		Northern Illinois	L 72–73	9–5 (0–1)	17 – Williams	11 – Mballa	5 – Jordan	Alumni Arena (3,069); Amherst, NY
January 7, 2020; 7:00 pm, ESPN+		at Ball State	L 66–88	9–6 (0–2)	16 – Johnson	6 – Mballa	4 – Jordan	Worthen Arena (4,811); Muncie, IN
January 10, 2020; 7:00 pm, CBSSN		at Miami (OH)	W 83–78	10–6 (1–2)	25 – Graves	13 – Mballa	6 – Segu	Millett Hall (1,056); Oxford, OH
January 14, 2020; 7:00 pm, ESPN+		Ohio	W 76–73	11–6 (2–2)	26 – Williams	9 – Mballa	8 – Jordan	Alumni Arena (2,404); Amherst, NY
January 17, 2020; 2:00 pm, ESPN+		at Central Michigan	W 86–67	12–6 (3–2)	18 – Williams	9 – Johnson	4 – Jordan	McGuirk Arena (2,121); Mount Pleasant, MI
January 21, 2020; 7:00 pm, ESPN+		Western Michigan	W 90–79	13–6 (4–2)	23 – Graves	8 – Mballa	5 – Jordan	Alumni Arena (2,748); Amherst, NY
January 24, 2020; 6:30 pm, CBSSN		Kent State	L 66–70	13–7 (4–3)	13 – Jordan	8 – Mballa	6 – Jordan	Alumni Arena (3,554); Amherst, NY
January 28, 2020; 7:00 pm, ESPN+		at Akron	W 77–74	14–7 (5–3)	18 – Johnson	17 – Mballa	4 – Tied	James A. Rhodes Arena (3,473); Akron, OH
January 31, 2020; 7:00 pm, ESPNU		Bowling Green	L 77–78	14–8 (5–4)	24 – Graves	15 – Mballa	3 – Jordan	Alumni Arena (5,322); Amherst, NY
February 4, 2020; 7:00 pm, ESPN+		at Eastern Michigan	L 62–66	14–9 (5–5)	16 – Mballa	11 – Mballa	4 – Segu	Convocation Center (1,364); Ypsilanti, MI
February 7, 2020; 9:00 pm, ESPNU		Central Michigan	W 65–60	15–9 (6–5)	20 – Williams	12 – Graves	7 – Jordan	Alumni Arena (3,095); Amherst, NY
February 15, 2020; 3:00 pm, ESPN3		at Toledo	W 83–67	16–9 (7–5)	27 – Graves	7 – Johnson	5 – Graves	Savage Arena (4,276); Toledo, OH
February 18, 2020; 7:00 pm, ESPN+		Ball State	W 72–59	17–9 (8–5)	16 – Tied	15 – Mballa	5 – Jordan	Alumni Arena (4,044); Amherst, NY
February 22, 2020; 3:30 pm, ESPN2		at Kent State	W 104–98 ^{2OT}	18–9 (9–5)	33 – Graves	14 – Mballa	7 – Jordan	MAC Center (3,005); Kent, OH
February 25, 2020; 7:00 pm, ESPN+		at Ohio	L 69–80	18–10 (9–6)	16 – Graves	7 – Tied	6 – Jordan	Convocation Center (4,837); Athens, OH
February 29, 2020; 2:00 pm, ESPN3		Akron	L 73–86	18–11 (9–7)	18 – Williams	9 – Williams	8 – Jordan	Alumni Arena (5,870); Amherst, NY
March 3, 2020; 7:00 pm, ESPN+		Miami (OH)	W 75–69	19–11 (10–7)	15 – Graves	14 – Mballa	6 – Jordan	Alumni Arena (3,252); Amherst, NY
March 6, 2020; TBA, ESPN+		at Bowling Green	W 88–84	20–11 (11–7)	25 – Graves	12 – Mballa	8 – Jordan	Stroh Center (3,550); Bowling Green, OH
MAC Tournament
Mar 9, 2020; 7:30 pm, ESPN+	(5)	(12) Miami (OH); First round	L 79–85	20–12	20 – Segu	10 – Williams	6 – Jordan	Alumni Arena (3,741); Amherst, NY
*Non-conference game. ^{#}Rankings from AP Poll. (#) Tournament seedings in parentheses. All times are in Eastern Time.
