= 2019–20 Ball State Cardinals men's basketball team =

American college basketball season

2019–20 Ball State Cardinals men's basketball

MAC West Division co-champions
- Conference: Mid-American Conference
- West Division
- Record: 18–13 (11–7 MAC)
- Head coach: James Whitford (7th season)
- Assistant coaches: Jason Grunkemeyer; Ben Botts (2nd season); Matt Crenshaw
- Home arena: Worthen Arena

2019–20 Mid-American Conference men's basketball standings
	Conf.				Overall
Team	W		L	PCT	W		L	PCT
East
Akron	14	–	4	.778	24	–	7	.774
Bowling Green	12	–	6	.667	21	–	10	.677
Buffalo	11	–	7	.611	20	–	12	.625
Kent State	9	–	9	.500	20	–	12	.625
Ohio	8	–	10	.444	17	–	15	.531
Miami (OH)	5	–	13	.278	13	–	19	.406
West
Ball State	11	–	7	.611	18	–	13	.581
Northern Illinois	11	–	7	.611	18	–	13	.581
Toledo	8	–	10	.444	17	–	15	.531
Central Michigan	7	–	11	.389	14	–	18	.438
Western Michigan	6	–	12	.333	13	–	19	.406
Eastern Michigan	6	–	12	.333	16	–	16	.500
Note: The 2020 MAC tournament was canceled prior to the quarterfinals due to the COVID-19 pandemic.

The 2019–20 Ball State Cardinals men's basketball team represent Ball State University during the 2019–20 NCAA Division I men's basketball season. The Cardinals, led by seventh-year head coach James Whitford, play their home games at Worthen Arena as members of the West Division of the Mid-American Conference.

== Previous season ==
The Cardinals finished the 2018–19 season 16–17, 6–12 to finish in fifth place in the MAC West division. They lost in the quarterfinals of the MAC tournament to Bowling Green.

== Roster ==
2019–20 Ball State Cardinals men's basketball team
Players
Coaches

Pos.	#	Name	Height	Weight	Year	Hometown
F	0	Miryne Thomas	6 ft 8 in (2.03 m)	200 lb (91 kg)	RS So	Cleveland, Ohio
G	1	K.J. Walton	6 ft 3 in (1.91 m)	200 lb (91 kg)	RS Sr	Indianapolis, Indiana
G	2	Luke Bumbalough	6 ft 1 in (1.85 m)	180 lb (82 kg)	Fr	New Castle, Indiana
G	3	Josh Thompson	6 ft 0 in (1.83 m)	195 lb (88 kg)	RS Sr	Indianapolis, Indiana
G	4	Lucas Kroft	6 ft 5 in (1.96 m)	200 lb (91 kg)	Fr	Fort Wayne, Indiana
G	5	Ishmael El-Amin	6 ft 1 in (1.85 m)	180 lb (82 kg)	Jr	Minneapolis, Minnesota
G	11	Jarron Coleman	6 ft 5 in (1.96 m)	205 lb (93 kg)	RS Fr	Indianapolis, Indiana
F	12	Brachen Hazen	6 ft 8 in (2.03 m)	210 lb (95 kg)	RS Jr	Columbia City, Indiana
G	13	Kani Acree	6 ft 6 in (1.98 m)	185 lb (84 kg)	RS Fr	Carbondale, Illinois
F	14	Kyle Mallers	6 ft 7 in (2.01 m)	220 lb (100 kg)	Sr	Fort Wayne, Indiana
F	15	Zach Gunn	6 ft 6 in (1.98 m)	210 lb (95 kg)	Jr	Fishers, Indiana
F	25	Tahjai Teague	6 ft 8 in (2.03 m)	215 lb (98 kg)	RS Sr	Indianapolis, Indiana
C	34	Ben Hendriks	6 ft 10 in (2.08 m)	215 lb (98 kg)	Fr	Mississauga, Ontario
C	44	Blake Huggins	6 ft 10 in (2.08 m)	245 lb (111 kg)	RS So	Union City, Tennessee

Head coach

- James Whitford (Wisconsin)

Assistant coach(es)

- Jason Grunkemeyer (Miami (OH))
- Ben Botts (Purdue Fort Wayne)
- Matt Crenshaw (IUPUI)

Legend

- (C) Team captain
- (S) Suspended
- (I) Ineligible
- (W) Walk-on
- Injured
- Current redshirt

Roster
Last update: November 24, 2019

== Schedule and results ==
Date time, TV	Rank^{#}	Opponent^{#}	Result	Record	Site (attendance) city, state
Non-conference regular season
November 5, 2019*; 7:00 pm, ESPN3		Defiance	W 87–43	1–0	John E. Worthen Arena (3,429); Muncie, IN
November 9, 2019*; 7:00 pm, ESPN3		at Evansville	L 75–79	1–1	Ford Center (5,372); Evansville, IN
November 13, 2019*; 8:00 pm, ESPN+		at UIC	W 67–48	2–1	Credit Union 1 Arena (1,906); Chicago, IL
November 17, 2019*; 4:30 pm, ESPN3		vs. Indiana State	W 69–55	3–1	Bankers Life Fieldhouse (2,425); Indianapolis, IN
November 20, 2019*; 7:00 pm, ESPN+		Northern Kentucky	L 57–59	3–2	John E. Worthen Arena (3,722); Muncie, IN
November 23, 2019*; 3:30 pm, ESPN+		Howard	W 100–69	4–2	John E. Worthen Arena (4,192); Muncie, IN
November 26, 2019*; 6:00 pm, ESPN3		Western Illinois	L 62–69	4–3	John E. Worthen Arena (3,088); Muncie, IN
December 3, 2019*; 7:00 pm, ESPN+		Loyola–Chicago	L 58-70	4–4	John E. Worthen Arena (4,128); Muncie, IN
December 7, 2019*; 1:00 pm, ESPN+		IUPUI	W 102–54	5–4	John E. Worthen Arena (4,733); Muncie, IN
December 18, 2019*; 7:00 pm, ACCNX		at Georgia Tech; Diamond Head Classic	W 65–47	6–4	McCamish Pavilion (4,203); Atlanta, GA
December 22, 2019*; 9:30 pm, ESPN2		vs. No. 22 Washington; Diamond Head Classic quarterfinal	L 64–85	6–5	Stan Sheriff Center (6,179); Honolulu, HI
December 24, 2019*; 1:30 am, ESPNU		vs. UTEP; Diamond Head Classic consolation 2nd round	L 70–71	6–6	Stan Sheriff Center (5,757); Honolulu, HI
December 25, 2019*; 1:30 pm, ESPNU		vs. Portland; Diamond Head Classic 7th place game	W 61–46	7–6	Stan Sheriff Center; Honolulu, HI
MAC regular season
January 3, 2020; 7:00 pm, CBSSN		Toledo	W 61–57	8–6 (1–0)	John E. Worthen Arena (4,707); Muncie, IN
January 7, 2020; 7:00 pm, ESPN+		Buffalo	W 88–68	9–6 (2–0)	John E. Worthen Arena (4,811); Muncie, IN
January 10, 2020; 9:00 pm, CBSSN		at Akron	L 60–75	9–7 (2–1)	James A. Rhodes Arena (2,706); Akron, OH
January 14, 2020; 7:00 pm, ESPN+		at Eastern Michigan	W 69–52	10–7 (3–1)	Convocation Center (1,313); Ypsilanti, MI
January 18, 2020; 1:00 pm, ESPN+		Miami (OH)	W 71–62	11–7 (4–1)	John E. Worthen Arena (4,624); Muncie, IN
January 25, 2020; 4:30 pm, ESPN3		at Central Michigan	L 66–71	11–8 (4–2)	McGuirk Arena (2,371); Mount Pleasant, MI
January 28, 2020; 7:00 pm, ESPN+		at Bowling Green	L 61–67	11–9 (4–3)	Stroh Center (2,125); Bowling Green, OH
February 1, 2020; 1:00 pm, ESPN3		Ohio	W 65–54	12–9 (5–3)	John E. Worthen Arena (5,238); Muncie, IN
February 4, 2020; 7:00 pm, ESPN+		at Kent State	W 62–54	13–9 (6–3)	MAC Center (2,025); Kent, OH
February 8, 2020; 4:00 pm, ESPN3		at Western Michigan	L 64–68	13–10 (6–4)	University Arena (2,387); Kalamazoo, MI
February 11, 2020; 7:00 pm, ESPN+		Northern Illinois	W 63–59	14–10 (7–4)	John E. Worthen Arena (4,288); Muncie, IN
February 15, 2020; 1:00 pm, ESPN3		Bowling Green	L 71–77	14–11 (7–5)	John E. Worthen Arena (5,492); Muncie, IN
February 18, 2020; 7:00 pm, ESPN+		at Buffalo	L 59–72	14–12 (7–6)	Alumni Arena (4,044); Amherst, NY
February 22, 2020; 1:00 pm, ESPN3		Eastern Michigan	W 64–55	15–12 (8–6)	John E. Worthen Arena (5,921); Muncie, IN
February 25, 2020; 7:00 pm, ESPN+		Western Michigan	W 71–61	16–12 (9–6)	John E. Worthen Arena (4,390); Muncie, IN
February 29, 2020; 7:00 pm, ESPN3		at Toledo	L 63–69	16–13 (9–7)	Savage Arena (5,842); Toledo, OH
March 3, 2020; 7:00 pm, ESPN+		Central Michigan	W 85–68	17–13 (10–7)	John E. Worthen Arena (4,008); Muncie, IN
March 6, 2020; 8:00 pm, ESPN3		at Northern Illinois	W 75–54	18–13 (11–7)	Convocation Center (1,749); DeKalb, IL
MAC tournament
March 12, 2020; 9:00 pm, ESPN+	(3)	vs. (6) Kent State; Quarterfinals	MAC Tournament cancelled due to the COVID-19 pandemic		Rocket Mortgage FieldHouse; Cleveland, OH
*Non-conference game. ^{#}Rankings from AP Poll. (#) Tournament seedings in parentheses. All times are in Eastern Time Source.

== See also ==
- 2019–20 Ball State Cardinals women's basketball team
