= 2007 Florida Gators baseball team =

American college baseball season

2007 Florida Gators baseball
- Conference: Southeastern Conference
- Record: 29–30 (15–15 SEC)
- Head coach: Pat McMahon (6th year)
- Assistant coach: Ross Jones (6th year); Tim Parenton (4th year)
- Home stadium: Alfred A. McKethan Stadium

2007 Southeastern Conference baseball standings
	Conf.				Overall
Team	W		L	PCT	W		L	PCT
Eastern
No. 9 Vanderbilt ^{x}‍†‍‡‍^{y}	22	–	8	.733	54	–	13	.806
No. 10 South Carolina ‍‍‍^{y}	17	–	13	.567	46	–	20	.697
Florida ‍‍‍	15	–	15	.500	29	–	30	.492
Tennessee ‍‍‍	13	–	15	.464	34	–	25	.576
Kentucky ‍‍‍	13	–	16	.448	34	–	19	.642
Georgia ‍‍‍	11	–	19	.367	23	–	33	.411
Western
No. 21 Arkansas ^{x}‍‍‍^{y}	18	–	12	.600	43	–	21	.672
No. 8 Mississippi State ‍‍‍^{y}	15	–	13	.536	38	–	22	.633
No. 17 Ole Miss ‍‍‍^{y}	16	–	14	.533	40	–	25	.615
Alabama ‍‍‍	15	–	15	.500	31	–	26	.544
LSU ‍‍‍	12	–	17	.414	29	–	26	.527
Auburn ‍‍‍	10	–	20	.333	31	–	25	.554
x – Division champion † – Conference champion ‡ – Tournament champion y – Invited to the NCAA tournament As of June 30, 2007; Rankings from Coaches' Poll

The 2007 Florida Gators baseball team represented the University of Florida in the sport of baseball during the 2007 college baseball season. The Gators competed in Division I of the National Collegiate Athletic Association (NCAA) and the Eastern Division of the Southeastern Conference (SEC). They played their home games at Alfred A. McKethan Stadium, on the university's Gainesville, Florida campus. The team was coached by Pat McMahon, who was in his sixth and final season at Florida. McMahon was dismissed after the conclusion of the season, following two consecutive years without a winning record.

== Roster ==
2007 Florida Gators baseball team
Players
Coaches

#	Pos.	Name	B/T	Height	Weight	Year	Home town
21	RHP	Bryan Augenstein	R/R	6 ft 5 in (1.96 m)	225 lb (102 kg)	Jr	Sebastian, FL
32	C	Dustin Bamberg	R/R	6 ft 1 in (1.85 m)	200 lb (91 kg)	Jr	Winter Haven, FL
11	INF	Bryson Barber	L/R	6 ft 1 in (1.85 m)	225 lb (102 kg)	Jr	Pensacola, FL
1	INF	Avery Barnes	L/R	5 ft 11 in (1.8 m)	165 lb (75 kg)	So	High Springs, FL
47	C	Brett Bentley	R/R	6 ft 3 in (1.91 m)	210 lb (95 kg)	So	Tampa, FL
39	RHP	Michael Branham	R/R	6 ft 3 in (1.91 m)	215 lb (98 kg)	So	Tampa, FL
44	RHP	Billy Bullock	R/R	6 ft 6 in (1.98 m)	225 lb (102 kg)	Fr	Balm, FL
35	LHP	Kevin Chapman	L/L	6 ft 3 in (1.91 m)	185 lb (84 kg)	Fr	Coral Springs, FL
4	OF	Riley Cooper	R/R	6 ft 3 in (1.91 m)	206 lb (93 kg)	Fr	Clearwater, FL
20	LHP	Tony Davis	S/L	5 ft 11 in (1.8 m)	180 lb (82 kg)	Fr	Cooper City, FL
17	OF	Matt den Dekker	L/L	6 ft 0 in (1.83 m)	205 lb (93 kg)	Fr	Fort Lauderdale, FL
25	RHP	Josh Edmondson	R/R	6 ft 1 in (1.85 m)	195 lb (88 kg)	Jr	LaGrange, GA
10	INF	Cole Figueroa	L/R	5 ft 10 in (1.78 m)	180 lb (82 kg)	Fr	Tallahassee, FL
50	C	Teddy Foster	R/R	6 ft 3 in (1.91 m)	230 lb (104 kg)	So	Jacksonville, FL
49	RHP	Clint Franklin	R/R	6 ft 3 in (1.91 m)	185 lb (84 kg)	Fr	Orlando, FL
54	RHP	Andy Gale	R/R	6 ft 6 in (1.98 m)	235 lb (107 kg)	So	Durham, NH
28	RHP	Kris Gawriluk	R/R	6 ft 0 in (1.83 m)	205 lb (93 kg)	Sr	Deltona, FL
40	OF	Jake Hicks	R/R	6 ft 3 in (1.91 m)	215 lb (98 kg)	Fr	Molino, FL
38	LHP	David Hurst	L/L	6 ft 1 in (1.85 m)	205 lb (93 kg)	Sr	Jacksonville, FL
27	RHP	Patrick Keating	R/R	6 ft 0 in (1.83 m)	205 lb (93 kg)	So	Harrisburg, IL
5	OF	Jared Kubin	R/R	6 ft 2 in (1.88 m)	225 lb (102 kg)	So	Oakton, VA
33	LHP	J.K. LaCoste	R/L	6 ft 4 in (1.93 m)	205 lb (93 kg)	So	Jacksonville, FL
48	RHP	Jarrod Langlois	R/R	6 ft 2 in (1.88 m)	205 lb (93 kg)	Fr	Jacksonville, FL
13	INF	Matt LaPorta	R/R	6 ft 1 in (1.85 m)	215 lb (98 kg)	Sr	Port Charlotte, FL
2	OF	Brian Leclerc	L/R	5 ft 10 in (1.78 m)	185 lb (84 kg)	Sr	Clearwater, FL
14	LHP	Stephen Locke	R/L	6 ft 1 in (1.85 m)	185 lb (84 kg)	So	Tampa, FL
6	OF	Ryan Lockwood	L/R	5 ft 11 in (1.8 m)	175 lb (79 kg)	Fr	Lutz, FL
3	INF	Brandon McArthur	R/R	6 ft 1 in (1.85 m)	205 lb (93 kg)	Jr	Seffner, FL
30	RHP	Kyle Mullaney	R/R	6 ft 1 in (1.85 m)	190 lb (86 kg)	Fr	Jacksonville, FL
18	C	Cody Neer	S/R	6 ft 3 in (1.91 m)	215 lb (98 kg)	So	Orlando, FL
29	OF	Chris Petrie	L/L	5 ft 9 in (1.75 m)	205 lb (93 kg)	Sr	Jacksonville, FL
9	OF	Jonathan Pigott	R/R	6 ft 2 in (1.88 m)	205 lb (93 kg)	Fr	Ormond Beach, FL
7	INF	Clayton Pisani	R/R	6 ft 0 in (1.83 m)	185 lb (84 kg)	Fr	Naples, FL
15	LHP	Steven Porter	L/L	6 ft 3 in (1.91 m)	215 lb (98 kg)	Sr	Ocoee, FL
43	OF	Austin Pride	R/R	6 ft 3 in (1.91 m)	220 lb (100 kg)	Sr	Longwood, FL
31	C	Chris Schaeffer	R/R	5 ft 11 in (1.8 m)	190 lb (86 kg)	Fr	Port St. Lucie, FL
24	OF	Bo Smith	L/L	6 ft 2 in (1.88 m)	205 lb (93 kg)	So	Gainesville, FL
41	C	Brett Smith	R/R	6 ft 0 in (1.83 m)	205 lb (93 kg)	So	Longwood, FL
23	RHP	Chas Spottswood	R/R	6 ft 4 in (1.93 m)	195 lb (88 kg)	So	Key West, FL
45	LHP	Patrick Thompson	L/L	6 ft 2 in (1.88 m)	195 lb (88 kg)	Sr	Gainesville, FL
22	C	Hampton Tignor	R/R	6 ft 0 in (1.83 m)	205 lb (93 kg)	Fr	Sarasota, FL
8	INF	Jon Townsend	R/R	6 ft 0 in (1.83 m)	195 lb (88 kg)	Jr	London, KY
34	OF	Cody Wheeler	R/R	6 ft 1 in (1.85 m)	220 lb (100 kg)	So	Coral Springs, FL
16	RHP	Tommy Wynn	R/R	6 ft 3 in (1.91 m)	200 lb (91 kg)	Jr	Fort Lauderdale, FL

Head coach

Pat McMahon

Assistant coach(es)

Ross Jones
Tim Parenton

Legend

- (C) Team captain
- (S) Suspended
- (I) Ineligible
- Injured
- Current redshirt

Roster

== Schedule ==
2007 Florida Gators baseball game log
Regular season
February

Date	Opponent	Rank	Stadium Site	Score	Win	Loss	Save	Attendance	Overall Record	SEC Record
February 9	VMI		McKethan Stadium	3–5	Barham (1–0)	Augenstein (0–1)	Crum (1)	3,856	0–1	–
February 10	VMI		McKethan Stadium	4–7	Bowman (1–0)	Locke (0–1)	Crum (2)	3,225	0–2	–
February 11	VMI		McKethan Stadium	7–0	Bullock (1–0)	Smink (0–1)	None	2,841	1–2	–
February 13	Florida A&M		McKethan Stadium	15–1	Chapman (1–0)	Smith (0–3)	None	1,262	2–2	–
February 16	No. 13 Miami (FL); Rivalry		McKethan Stadium	7–2	Augenstein (1–1)	Maine (1–1)	None	3,789	3–2	–
February 17	No. 13 Miami (FL); Rivalry		McKethan Stadium	7–5	Keating (1–0)	Erickson (0–1)	Hurst (1)	4,427	4–2	–
February 18	No. 13 Miami (FL); Rivalry		McKethan Stadium	7–10	Santana (1–0)	Bullock (1–1)	Garcia (1)	3,867	4–3	–
February 20	No. 2 Florida State; Rivalry		McKethan Stadium	6–14	Burge (1–0)	Chapman (1–1)	None	5,140	4–4	–
February 23	Kent State		McKethan Stadium	4–10	Pacella (1–0)	Augenstein (1–2)	Lamport (1)	3,060	4–5	–
February 24	Kent State		McKethan Stadium	7–0	Locke (1–1)	Rodgers (0–2)	None	3,113	5–5	–
February 25	Kent State		McKethan Stadium	0–1	Smith (1–0)	Bullock (1–2)	Davis (1)	2,761	5–6	–
February 27	at South Florida		Red McEwen Field; Tampa, FL	10–5	Mullaney (1–0)	Otero (3–1)	None	2,426	6–6	–

March

Date	Opponent	Rank	Stadium Site	Score	Win	Loss	Save	Attendance	Overall Record	SEC Record
March 3 (1)	George Washington		McKethan Stadium	7–1	Augenstein (2–2)	Frazier (0–3)	None	–	7–6	–
March 3 (2)	George Washington		McKethan Stadium	24–4	Locke (2–1)	Haese (0–3)	None	2,636	8–6	–
March 4	George Washington		McKethan Stadium	20–3	Bullock (2–2)	Lucas (0–1)	None	3,168	9–6	–
March 6	Jacksonville		McKethan Stadium	5–6	Gardner (2–2)	Edmondson (0–1)	None	3,730	9–7	–
March 9	at No. 9 Texas A&M		Olsen Field; College Station, TX	1–7	Newmann (3–0)	Augenstein (2–3)	None	3,165	9–8	–
March 10	at No. 9 Texas A&M		Olsen Field	5–13	Thebeau (2–0)	Locke (2–2)	None	4,154	9–9	–
March 11	at No. 9 Texas A&M		Olsen Field	1–6	Nicholson (4–1)	Bullock (2–3)	None	3,577	9–10	–
March 14	Army		McKethan Stadium	5–3	Edmondson (1–1)	Mayhew (0–4)	Keating (1)	3,130	10–10	–
March 16	Mississippi State		McKethan Stadium	9–12	Weatherford (3–0)	Porter (0–1)	Lalor (1)	3,281	10–11	0–1
March 17	Mississippi State		McKethan Stadium	10–8	Locke (3–2)	Pigott (2–2)	Porter (1)	3,151	11–11	1–1
March 18	Mississippi State		McKethan Stadium	13–14	Crosswhite (2–1)	Keating (1–1)	Moreland (1)	3,316	11–12	1–2
March 20	at Stetson		Melching Field; DeLand, FL	3–4	Donovan (1–1)	Franklin (0–1)	Elsemiller (9)	2,975	11–13	–
March 23	at Auburn		Plainsman Park; Auburn, AL	8–7^{10}	Keating (2–1)	Dennis (1–2)	None	3,187	12–13	2–2
March 24	at Auburn		Plainsman Park	12–9	Edmondson (2–1)	Bristow (1–2)	Hurst (2)	2,917	13–13	3–2
March 25	at Auburn		Plainsman Park	10–3	Hurst (1–0)	Crawford (3–2)	None	2,387	14–13	4–2
March 27	Bethune–Cookman		McKethan Stadium	5–3	Davis (1–0)	Burgos (1–4)	Keating (2)	2,779	15–13	–
March 30	at Georgia		Foley Field; Athens, GA	7–5	Augenstein (3–3)	Moreau (2–1)	Porter (2)	2,929	16–13	5–2
March 31	at Georgia		Foley Field	9–1	Davis (2–0)	Dodson (1–4)	Hurst (3)	2,959	17–13	6–2

April

Date	Opponent	Rank	Stadium Site	Score	Win	Loss	Save	Attendance	Overall Record	SEC Record
April 1	at Georgia		Foley Field	3–2^{11}	Mullaney (2–0)	Fields (1–4)	None	1,545	18–13	7–2
April 3	vs. No. 1 Florida State; Rivalry	No. 22	Baseball Grounds; Jacksonville, FL	16–7	Chapman (2–1)	Graham (1–2)	None	12,280	19–13	–
April 6	No. 5 South Carolina	No. 22	McKethan Stadium	2–12	Honeycutt (7–0)	Augenstein (3–4)	None	4,090	19–14	7–3
April 7	No. 5 South Carolina	No. 22	McKethan Stadium	9–8	Hurst (2–0)	Pelzer (1–2)	None	3,651	20–14	8–3
April 8	No. 5 South Carolina	No. 22	McKethan Stadium	6–8^{11}	Jeffords (3–0)	Porter (0–2)	None	3,122	20–15	8–4
April 10	UCF	No. 17	McKethan Stadium	2–6	Sweat (3–2)	Locke (3–3)	Weiss (5)	2,874	20–16	–
April 14 (1)	at No. 5 Arkansas	No. 17	Baum Stadium; Fayetteville, AR	3–14	Schmidt (8–0)	Davis (2–1)	None	–	20–17	8–5
April 14 (2)	at No. 5 Arkansas	No. 17	Baum Stadium	1–7	Welker (5–2)	Bullock (2–4)	None	8,184	20–18	8–6
April 15	at No. 5 Arkansas	No. 17	Baum Stadium	7–10	Hill (2–1)	Porter (0–3)	None	8,326	20–19	8–7
April 18	at No. 1 Florida State; Rivalry		Dick Howser Stadium; Tallahassee, FL	5–4	Gawriluk (1–0)	O'Dell (3–1)	Hurst (4)	6,574	21–19	–
April 20	Kentucky		McKethan Stadium	2–9	Rusin (4–2)	Davis (2–2)	None	3,095	21–20	8–8
April 21	Kentucky		McKethan Stadium	10–7	Augenstein (4–4)	Albers (5–2)	Hurst (5)	3,342	22–20	9–8
April 22	Kentucky		McKethan Stadium	5–4	Keating (3–1)	Oxford (3–1)	None	3,004	23–20	10–8
April 27	at No. 2 Vanderbilt		Hawkins Field; Nashville, TN	1–10	Price (8–0)	Mullaney (2–1)	None	2,524	23–21	10–9
April 28	at No. 2 Vanderbilt		Hawkins Field	6–17	Davis (1–0)	Augenstein (4–5)	None	2,625	23–22	10–10
April 29	at No. 2 Vanderbilt		Hawkins Field	5–13	Crowell (2–1)	Bullock (2–5)	None	2,477	23–23	10–11

May

Date	Opponent	Rank	Stadium Site	Score	Win	Loss	Save	Attendance	Overall Record	SEC Record
May 4	Alabama		McKethan Stadium	6–2	Mullaney (3–1)	Hunter (5–4)	Hurst (6)	3,327	24–23	11–11
May 5	Alabama		McKethan Stadium	9–3	Augenstein (5–5)	Quigley (4–5)	None	3,159	25–23	12–11
May 6	Alabama		McKethan Stadium	5–7^{10}	Hyatt (5–1)	Hurst (2–1)	None	3,056	25–24	12–12
May 8	North Florida		McKethan Stadium	8–15	Stilley (1–2)	Franklin (0–2)	Sheppard (1)	2,845	25–25	–
May 11	at LSU		Alex Box Stadium; Baton Rouge, LA	19–3	Mullaney (4–1)	Bradford (10–3)	None	7,582	26–25	13–12
May 12	at LSU		Alex Box Stadium	8–4	Augenstein (6–5)	Furbush (3–8)	None	7,674	27–25	14–12
May 13	at LSU		Alex Box Stadium	4–9	Byrd (6–1)	Bullock (2–6)	Forrest (1)	7,092	27–26	14–13
May 17	Tennessee		McKethan Stadium	5–6	Adkins (6–7)	Mullaney (4–2)	Lockwood (7)	2,681	27–27	14–14
May 18	Tennessee		McKethan Stadium	20–2	Augenstein (7–5)	Hernandez (4–3)	None	3,340	28–27	15–14
May 19	Tennessee		McKethan Stadium	7–11	Cobb (8–5)	Bullock (2–7)	Lockwood (8)	2,829	28–28	15–15

Postseason
SEC Tournament

Date	Opponent	Rank	Stadium Site	Score	Win	Loss	Save	Attendance	Overall Record	SECT Record
May 23	vs. No. 10 South Carolina		Regions Park; Hoover, AL	3–4^{12}	Jeffords (6–1)	Hurst (2–2)	None	5,746	28–29	0–1
May 24	vs. Alabama		Regions Park	3–2	Augenstein (8–5)	Stroup (3–1)	None	5,782	29–29	1–1
May 25	vs. No. 10 South Carolina		Regions Park	3–5	Cisco (6–2)	Keating (3–2)	Jeffords (4)	6,137	29–30	1–2

Rankings from Collegiate Baseball. All times Eastern. Retrieved from FloridaGators.com

== See also ==
- Florida Gators
- List of Florida Gators baseball players
