= 2019–20 Central Michigan Chippewas men's basketball team =

American college basketball season

2019–20 Central Michigan Chippewas men's basketball
- Conference: Mid-American Conference
- West Division
- Record: 14–18 (7–11 MAC)
- Head coach: Keno Davis (8th season)
- Assistant coaches: Chris Davis; Chris Tifft; DJ Mocini
- Home arena: McGuirk Arena

2019–20 Mid-American Conference men's basketball standings
| | Conf. | | | | Overall |
| Team | W | | L | PCT | W | | L | PCT |
|---|---|---|---|---|---|---|---|---|
East
| Akron | 14 | – | 4 | .778 | 24 | – | 7 | .774 |
| Bowling Green | 12 | – | 6 | .667 | 21 | – | 10 | .677 |
| Buffalo | 11 | – | 7 | .611 | 20 | – | 12 | .625 |
| Kent State | 9 | – | 9 | .500 | 20 | – | 12 | .625 |
| Ohio | 8 | – | 10 | .444 | 17 | – | 15 | .531 |
| Miami (OH) | 5 | – | 13 | .278 | 13 | – | 19 | .406 |
West
| Ball State | 11 | – | 7 | .611 | 18 | – | 13 | .581 |
| Northern Illinois | 11 | – | 7 | .611 | 18 | – | 13 | .581 |
| Toledo | 8 | – | 10 | .444 | 17 | – | 15 | .531 |
| Central Michigan | 7 | – | 11 | .389 | 14 | – | 18 | .438 |
| Western Michigan | 6 | – | 12 | .333 | 13 | – | 19 | .406 |
| Eastern Michigan | 6 | – | 12 | .333 | 16 | – | 16 | .500 |
Note: The 2020 MAC tournament was canceled prior to the quarterfinals due to the COVID-19 pandemic.

The 2019–20 Central Michigan Chippewas men's basketball team represented Central Michigan University during the 2019–20 NCAA Division I men's basketball season. The Chippewas, led by eighth-year head coach Keno Davis, played their home games at McGuirk Arena as members of the West Division of the Mid-American Conference. They finished the season 14–18, 7–11 in MAC play to finish in fourth place in the West Division. They lost in the first round of the MAC tournament to Ohio.

== Previous season ==
The Chippewas finished the 2018–19 season 23–12, 10–8 in MAC play to finish in second place in the West Division. They defeated Western Michigan in the first round of the MAC tournament and Kent State to advance to the quarterfinals where they lost to 18th ranked Buffalo. They were invited to the College Basketball Invitational where were defeated by DePaul.

== Offseason ==
=== Departures ===
| Name | Number | Pos. | Height | Weight | Year | Hometown | Reason for departure |
|---|---|---|---|---|---|---|---|
| Larry Austin Jr. | 0 | G | 6'2" | 182 | RS Senior | Springfield, IL | Graduated |
| Shawn Roundtree | 2 | G | 6'0" | 185 | RS Senior | Edwardsville, IL | Graduated |
| Mikhail Myles | 4 | G | 6'3" | 195 | RS Junior | Corunna, MI | |
| Colten Webber-Mitchell | 10 | G | 6'1" | 180 | Freshman | Lake Odessa, MI | |
| Innocent Nwoko | 11 | C | 6'11" | 232 | RS Sophomore | New Haven, MI | Transferred to Saginaw Valley State |
| Austin Ervin | 25 | F | 6'5" | 247 | RS Junior | St. Johns, MI | Graduated; Became Assistant coach at Indiana University South Bend |

=== Incoming transfers ===
| Name | Number | Pos. | Height | Weight | Year | Hometown | Previous School |
|---|---|---|---|---|---|---|---|
| Travon Broadway Jr. | 0 | G | 6'5" | 182 | Junior | Miami, FL | Junior college Transferred from Iowa Western Community College. |
| Devontae Lane | 2 | G | 6'2" | 215 | Junior | Iowa City, IA | Junior college Transferred from Indian Hills Community College. |
| Deschon Winston | 11 | G | 6'4" | 175 | Junior | Woodland Hills, CA | Junior college transferred from City College of San Francisco |

=== Recruiting class of 2019 ===
College recruiting information
| Name | Hometown | School | Height | Weight | Commit date |
|---|---|---|---|---|---|
| Caleb Hodgson #49 C | Dansville, MI | Dansville High School | 6 ft 10 in (2.08 m) | 227 lb (103 kg) | Oct 10, 2018 |
| Caleb Hodgson #49 C | Recruit ratings: Scout: Rivals: (75) | | | | |
Overall recruit ranking:
Note: In many cases, Scout, Rivals, 247Sports, On3, and ESPN may conflict in their listings of height and weight.; In these cases, the average was taken. ESPN grades are on a 100-point scale.; Sources: "2019 Team Ranking". Rivals.

== Roster ==
2019–20 Central Michigan Chippewas men's basketball team
Players
Coaches

| Pos. | # | Name | Height | Weight | Year | Previous school | Hometown |
|---|---|---|---|---|---|---|---|
| G | 0 | Travon Broadway Jr. | 6 ft 5 in (1.96 m) | 182 lb (83 kg) | Jr | Coral Springs Christian Academy; Iowa Western Community College | Miami, FL |
| G | 1 | Corey Redman | 6 ft 6 in (1.98 m) | 192 lb (87 kg) | Sr | Boyne City | Boyne City, MI |
| G | 2 | Devontae Lane | 6 ft 2 in (1.88 m) | 215 lb (98 kg) | Jr | Iowa City West; Indian Hills Community College | Iowa City, IA |
| G | 3 | P. J. Mitchell | 6 ft 1 in (1.85 m) | 183 lb (83 kg) | RS Fr | Detroit Edison | Detroit, MI |
| F | 5 | Rob Montgomery | 6 ft 7 in (2.01 m) | 230 lb (104 kg) | Sr | Mount Zion Baptist Christian School; Indian Hills CC | Montgomery Village, MD |
| G | 11 | Deschon Winston | 6 ft 4 in (1.93 m) | 175 lb (79 kg) | Jr | Birmingham; City College of San Francisco | Woodland Hills, CA |
| F | 12 | Kevin Hamlet | 6 ft 7 in (2.01 m) | 220 lb (100 kg) | RS Jr | First Love Christian Academy; Mineral Area College | Scarborough, ON |
| F | 14 | David DiLeo | 6 ft 8 in (2.03 m) | 224 lb (102 kg) | Sr | New Hampton School | Iowa City, IA |
| G | 15 | Matty Smith | 5 ft 11 in (1.8 m) | 180 lb (82 kg) | Sr | South Elgin | Elgin, IL |
| G | 20 | Kevin McKay | 6 ft 5 in (1.96 m) | 228 lb (103 kg) | Sr | Warren De La Salle | Warren, MI |
| G | 22 | Matt Beachler | 6 ft 4 in (1.93 m) | 197 lb (89 kg) | Jr | Lowell | Lowell, MI |
| G | 23 | Dallas Morgan | 6 ft 2 in (1.88 m) | 202 lb (92 kg) | Sr | Metamora; Moberly Area Community College | Peoria, IL |
| F | 24 | Romelo Burrell | 6 ft 7 in (2.01 m) | 181 lb (82 kg) | Jr | Morgan Park; John A. Logan College | Chicago, IL |
| G | 30 | Dylan Jergens | 6 ft 0 in (1.83 m) | 160 lb (73 kg) | Fr | Howardsville Christian | St. Johns, MI |
| F | 31 | Michael Kemp (W) | 6 ft 3 in (1.91 m) | 195 lb (88 kg) | Jr | Unionville-Sebewaing | Mendon, MI |
| G | 31 | Preston Enloe | 6 ft 3 in (1.91 m) | 185 lb (84 kg) | RS So | Hebron; Tarleton State | Plano, TX |
| F/C | 34 | Caleb Hodgson | 6 ft 10 in (2.08 m) | 227 lb (103 kg) | Fr | Dansville | Dansville, MI |

Head coach

- Keno Davis (Iowa)

Assistant coach(es)

- Chris Davis (Michigan)
- Chris Tifft (Nevada)
- DJ Mocini (Dayton)

Legend

- (C) Team captain
- (S) Suspended
- (I) Ineligible
- (W) Walk-on
- Injured
- Current redshirt

Roster

== Schedule and results ==
| Date time, TV | Rank^{#} | Opponent^{#} | Result | Record | High points | High rebounds | High assists | Site (attendance) city, state |
Non-conference regular season
| November 5, 2019*; 7:00 pm, CSN Digital | | Michigan–Dearborn | W 102–62 | 1–0 | 23 – Morgan | 9 – Montgomery | 6 – Lane | McGuirk Arena (2,110); Mount Pleasant, MI |
| November 10, 2019*; 2:00 pm, ESPN+ | | Mississippi Valley State | W 134–78 | 2–0 | 30 – DiLeo | 11 – Burrell | 6 – Winston | McGuirk Arena (1,896); Mount Pleasant, MI |
| November 16, 2019*; 2:00 pm, ESPN3 | | Sam Houston State | W 84–77 | 3–0 | 17 – Tied | 8 – Burrell | 3 – Tied | McGuirk Arena (1,683); Mount Pleasant, MI |
| November 18, 2019*; 7:00 pm, CSN Digital | | Siena Heights | W 115–58 | 4–0 | 27 – Morgan | 6 – Tied | 7 – Broadway Jr. | McGuirk Arena (1,840); Mount Pleasant, MI |
| November 21, 2019*; 8:00 pm, BTN+ | | at Minnesota | L 57–82 | 4–1 | 16 – McKay | 8 – McKay | 4 – McKay | Williams Arena (8,566); Minneapolis, MN |
| November 23, 2019*; 2:00 pm, CSN Digital | | Trinity (IL) | W 106–60 | 5–1 | 18 – McKay | 9 – Lane | 7 – Lane | McGuirk Arena (1,726); Mount Pleasant, MI |
| November 26, 2019*; 8:00 pm, FS1 | | at DePaul | L 75–88 | 5–2 | 20 – Morgan | 9 – Montgomery | 3 – Tied | Wintrust Arena (4,097); Chicago, IL |
| November 30, 2019*; 4:30 pm, ESPN+ | | Youngstown State | W 88–72 | 6–2 | 24 – McKay | 11 – McKay | 7 – Lane | McGuirk Arena (1,521); Mount Pleasant, MI |
| December 6, 2019*; 7:00 pm, ESPN3 | | UT Martin | W 84–75 | 7–2 | 17 – Lane | 7 – DiLeo | 5 – DiLeo | McGuirk Arena (1,803); Mount Pleasant, MI |
| December 8, 2019*; 2:00 pm, ESPN+ | | at Valparaiso | L 55–77 | 7–3 | 16 – McKay | 10 – McKay | 3 – Tied | Athletics-Recreation Center (2,880); Valparaiso, IN |
| December 14, 2019*; 2:00 pm, LHN | | at Texas | L 76–87 | 7–4 | 21 – McKay | 6 – McKay | 5 – Lane | Frank Erwin Center (8,587); Austin, TX |
| December 17, 2019*; 7:00 pm, NEC Front Row | | at Robert Morris | L 79–83 | 7–5 | 23 – DiLeo | 8 – DiLeo | 6 – Lane | UPMC Events Center (689); Moon Township, PA |
| December 28, 2019*; 12:00 pm, BTN | | at Purdue | L 62–97 | 7–6 | 12 – DiLeo | 6 – McKay | 4 – Winston | Mackey Arena (14,804); West Lafayette, IN |
MAC regular season
| January 4, 2020; 2:00 pm, ESPN+ | | Miami (OH) | W 93–82 | 8–6 (1–0) | 23 – Morgan | 10 – Montgomery | 5 – Lane | McGuirk Arena (1,732); Mount Pleasant, MI |
| January 7, 2020; 7:00 pm, ESPN+ | | Northern Illinois | W 68–67 | 9–6 (2–0) | 21 – McKay | 8 – McKay | 5 – Lane | McGuirk Arena (1,519); Mount Pleasant, MI |
| January 11, 2020; 7:00 pm, ESPN3 | | at Kent State | L 73–79 | 9–7 (2–1) | 16 – Montgomery | 7 – Montgomery | 4 – 3 tied | MAC Center (3,164); Kent, OH |
| January 14, 2020; 7:00 pm, ESPN+ | | at Toledo | W 74–67 | 10–7 (3–1) | 22 – Morgan | 11 – Montgomery | 2 – Tied | Savage Arena (3,341); Toledo, OH |
| January 18, 2020; 2:00 pm, ESPN+ | | Buffalo | L 67–86 | 10–8 (3–2) | 17 – DiLeo | 9 – DiLeo | 4 – Winston | McGuirk Arena (2,121); Mount Pleasant, MI |
| January 28, 2020; 4:30 pm, ESPN3 | | Ball State | W 71–66 | 11–8 (4–2) | 21 – Morgan | 9 – McKay | 3 – Lane | McGuirk Arena (2,371); Mount Pleasant, MI |
| January 28, 2020; 7:00 pm, ESPN+ | | at Miami (OH) | | | | | | Millett Hall; Oxford, OH |
| February 1, 2020; 2:00 pm, ESPN3 | | at Western Michigan; Michigan MAC Trophy | W 85–78 | 12–8 (5–2) | 19 – McKay | 12 – McKay | 4 – Winston | University Arena (3,416); Kalamazoo, MI |
| February 4, 2020; 7:00 pm, ESPN+ | | Bowling Green | W 92–82 | 13–8 (6–2) | 29 – Morgan | 6 – Tied | 2 – Tied | McGuirk Arena (1,805); Mount Pleasant, MI |
| February 7, 2020; 9:00 pm, ESPNU | | at Buffalo | L 60–65 | 13–9 (6–3) | 16 – DiLeo | 8 – McKay | 4 – Morgan | Alumni Arena (3,095); Buffalo, NY |
| February 11, 2020; 7:00 pm, ESPN+ | | Eastern Michigan; Michigan MAC Trophy | L 70–73 | 13–10 (6–4) | 24 – DiLeo | 7 – Tied | 4 – Tied | McGuirk Arena (1,929); Mount Pleasant, MI |
| February 15, 2020; 4:30 pm, ESPN3 | | Akron | L 67–80 | 13–11 (6–5) | 17 – Broadway Jr. | 8 – DiLeo | 5 – Lane | McGuirk Arena (1,906); Mount Pleasant, MI |
| February 18, 2020; 7:00 pm, ESPN3 | | at Ohio | L 69–77 | 13–12 (6–6) | 23 – McKay | 12 – McKay | 4 – McKay | Convocation Center (4,547); Athens, OH |
| February 22, 2020; 4:30 pm, ESPN3 | | at Northern Illinois | L 81–82 ^{OT} | 13–13 (6–7) | 25 – DiLeo | 10 – Montgomery | 3 – Tied | Convocation Center (3,016); Dekalb, IL |
| February 25, 2020; 7:00 pm, ESPN+ | | Toledo | L 81–93 | 13–14 (6–8) | 19 – Tied | 7 – McKay | 5 – Lane | McGuirk Arena (1,840); Mount Pleasant, MI |
| February 27, 2020; 7:00 pm, ESPN+ | | at Miami (OH) | L 56–76 | 13–15 (6–9) | 11 – Montgomery | 7 – Montgomery | 2 – Morgan | Millett Hall (836); Oxford, OH |
| February 29, 2020; 4:30 pm, ESPN3 | | at Eastern Michigan; Michigan MAC Trophy | L 63–67 | 13–16 (6–10) | 16 – Morgan | 16 – Montgomery | 3 – Morgan | Convocation Center (1,840); Ypsilanti, MI |
| March 3, 2020; 7:00 pm, ESPN+ | | at Ball State | L 68–85 | 13–17 (6–11) | 19 – Tied | 7 – DiLeo | 5 – Lane | Worthen Arena (4,008); Muncie, IN |
| March 6, 2020; 7:00 pm, ESPN3 | | Western Michigan; Michigan MAC Trophy | W 85–68 | 14–17 (7–11) | 20 – Morgan | 8 – DiLeo | 6 – Winston | McGuirk Arena (2,264); Mount Pleasant, MI |
MAC tournament
| March 9, 2020; 7:00 pm, ESPN+ | (9) | at (8) Ohio; First round | L 65–85 | 14–18 | 18 – McKay | 6 – Montgomery | 3 – Tied | Convocation Center (3,312); Athens, OH |
*Non-conference game. ^{#}Rankings from AP Poll. (#) Tournament seedings in parentheses. All times are in Eastern Time.

== See also ==
- 2019–20 Central Michigan Chippewas women's basketball team
