= 2007 Mississippi State Bulldogs baseball team =

American college baseball season

2007 Southeastern Conference baseball standings
	Conf.				Overall
Team	W		L	PCT	W		L	PCT
Eastern
No. 9 Vanderbilt ^{x}‍†‍‡‍^{y}	22	–	8	.733	54	–	13	.806
No. 10 South Carolina ‍‍‍^{y}	17	–	13	.567	46	–	20	.697
Florida ‍‍‍	15	–	15	.500	29	–	30	.492
Tennessee ‍‍‍	13	–	15	.464	34	–	25	.576
Kentucky ‍‍‍	13	–	16	.448	34	–	19	.642
Georgia ‍‍‍	11	–	19	.367	23	–	33	.411
Western
No. 21 Arkansas ^{x}‍‍‍^{y}	18	–	12	.600	43	–	21	.672
No. 8 Mississippi State ‍‍‍^{y}	15	–	13	.536	38	–	22	.633
No. 17 Ole Miss ‍‍‍^{y}	16	–	14	.533	40	–	25	.615
Alabama ‍‍‍	15	–	15	.500	31	–	26	.544
LSU ‍‍‍	12	–	17	.414	29	–	26	.527
Auburn ‍‍‍	10	–	20	.333	31	–	25	.554
x – Division champion † – Conference champion ‡ – Tournament champion y – Invited to the NCAA tournament As of June 30, 2007; Rankings from Coaches' Poll

The 2007 Mississippi State Bulldogs baseball team placed 2nd in the SEC WEST and reached the 2007 College World Series.

Ron Polk was the coach of the Bulldogs, in his 28th year.

== Regular season ==
The Bulldogs finished the regular season with a 33-18 record, and 15-13 SEC record. The team started strong, but finished weakly thanks to injuries to starting SS Brandon Turner and OF Jeff Flagg.

== SEC Tournament ==
The Bulldogs went 0-2 in the tournament, while facing aces Will Kline and David Price, of Ole Miss and Vanderbilt, respectively. It was the only time in 24 total appearances that a Ron Polk coached team went winless in the SEC Baseball Tournament.

== NCAA tournament ==
The Bulldogs were the 2 seed in the Tallahassee Regional, hosted by Florida State, and after defeating Stetson, upset Florida State twice. When Clemson, also a 2 seed, won the corresponding Myrtle Beach Regional, hosted by Coastal Carolina University, Mississippi State was selected to host the Super Regional. The Bulldogs defeated the Tigers in two games by scores of 8-6 and 8-5, with each game setting NCAA records for Super Regional attendance, and qualified for the College World Series.

== College World Series ==
The Bulldogs lost twice in the College World Series, to North Carolina and Louisville.

== Roster and Stats ==
=== Players ===
#	Name	Pos	B	T	YR	Hometown	G	AB	H	AVG	HR	SB
2	Brandon Turner	SS/2B	L	R	FR	Cleveland, TN	55	208	83	.399	3	4
3	Michael Rutledge	3B	R	R	JR	Cullman, AL	19	12	3	.250	0	0
5	Russ Sneed	3B/SS	R	R	FR	Senatobia, MS	24	54	17	.315	1	1
7	Jeffrey Rea	2B/OF	L	R	SR	Nettleton, MS	59	245	84	.343	1	13
8	Edward Easley	C	R	R	JR	Olive Branch, MS	60	243	87	.358	12	1
11	Brian LaNinfa	DH/1B	L	R	SR	Venice, FL	57	216	65	.301	5	1
13	Jet Butler	SS	S	R	FR	Pensacola, FL	35	102	25	.245	2	3
14	Ryan Duffy	C/OF	L	R	FR	West Melbourne, FL	5	4	1	.250	0	0
15	Mark Goforth	OF	L	R	SO	Covington, TN	52	170	48	.282	0	12
18	Mitch Moreland	1B/P/OF	L	L	JR	Amory, MS	60	239	82	.343	10	1
19	Andy Rice	OF	L	L	JR	Amory, MS	50	110	23	.209	2	1
20	Nick Hardy	OF	R	R	SO	Flora, MS.	44	37	8	.216	1	4
23	Cade Hoggard	OF	R	R	FR	Oxford, MS	17	29	8	.276	0	1
24	Matt Richardson	OF	R	R	SR	Lawrenceburg, KY	6	10	0	.000	0	0
25	Connor Powers	3B	R	R	FR	Naperville, IL	57	209	64	.306	8	0
27	Jeff Flagg	OF	R	R	SO	Jacksonville, FL	35	93	29	.312	5	0
29	Joseph McCaskill	OF	R	R	SR	Jackson, MS	56	189	59	.312	1	0
39	Wyn Diggs	C/OF	L	R	SR	Lexington, MS	17	19	6	.316	0	0
48	Brooks Lewis	C	R	R	SO	Heidelberg, MS	5	2	0	.000	0	0

=== Pitchers ===
#	Name	T	Year	Hometown	G	GS	IP	W	L	S	ERA
4	Jared Koon	R	SO	Lakeland, TN	5	3	13.0	0	0	0	9.69
6	Justin Pigott	L	JR	Jasper, AL	17	16	113.2	7	7	0	4.51
12	Josh Johnson	R	SR	Germantown, TN	14	13	64.1	3	3	0	6.02
16	Tyler Whitney	L	FR	Hoover, AL	10	9	45.2	5	1	0	5.72
17	Chad Crosswhite	R	SO	Picayune, MS	22	11	78.2	8	5	2	4.69
18	Mitch Moreland	L	JR	Starkville, MS	16	0	19.2	3	0	2	3.20
30	John Lalor	R	JR	Amory, MS	21	0	49.2	3	1	3	4.17
31	Ricky Bowen	R	FR	Midlothian, VA	27	0	36.0	5	2	5	3.00
32	Aaron Weatherford	R	SO	Tupelo, MS	20	6	66.1	3	2	5	3.53
34	Jesse Carver	L	JR	Starkville, MS	10	2	22.1	0	0	0	8.87
49	Mike Valentine	R	SR	Crystal Springs, MS	4	0	4.2	0	0	0	7.71
51	Greg Houston	R	FR	Caledonia, MS	16	0	25.1	1	1	1	5.33

These players were on the roster, but did not appear in any games and redshirted.

#	Name	POS	B	T	YR	Hometown
10	Andy Wilson	P	L	L	JR	Columbus, GA
26	Jason Nappi	3B/OF	R	R	FR	Birmingham, AL
28	Matt Lea	P	R	R	SO	Collierville, TN
33	Ryan Powers	SS/3B	R	R	FR	Beacon, NY
35	Jared Wesson	P	L	L	SO	Tupelo, MS
36	Leon Farmer	OF	R	R	JR	Saucier, MS
37	Jarred Holloway	P	R	L	FR	Russellville, AR
40	Grant Hogue	OF	S	R	JR	Hattiesburg, MS
41	Donny Stephens	C	R	R	FR	Mobile, AL
42	Will Coggin	2B	R	R	JR	Booneville, MS
44	Drew Hollinghead	P	R	R	FR	Leakesville, MS
50	Scott DeLoach	C	R	R	JR	Madison, MS
52	Kevin Hatch	P	R	R	JR	Carthage, MS

== Schedule and results ==
2007 Game Log
Regular season

#	Date	Opponent	Score	Site/stadium	Win	Loss	Save	Attendance	Record	SEC
1 Archived 2011-07-20 at the Wayback Machine	February 23	Murray State	10-5	Dudy Noble Field	Weatherford (1-0)	Donze	Crosswhite (1)	6063	1-0	
2Archived July 20, 2011, at the Wayback Machine	February 24	Murray State	13-1	Dudy Noble Field	Pigott (1-0)	Rowland	---	6045	2-0	
3Archived July 20, 2011, at the Wayback Machine	February 25	Murray State	17-9	Dudy Noble Field	Bowen (1-0)	McGaha	---	6263	3-0	
4Archived July 20, 2011, at the Wayback Machine	February 27	Mississippi Valley St.	13-2	Dudy Noble Field	Whitney (1-0)	Casias	---	6322	4-0	
5Archived July 20, 2011, at the Wayback Machine	March 2	Troy	2-1	Dudy Noble Field	Weatherford (2-0)	Snipes	Crosswhite (2)	6451	5-0	
6 Archived 2011-07-20 at the Wayback Machine	March 3	Michigan	3-4	Dudy Noble Field	Putnam	Pigott (0-1)	Jenzen	7272	5-1	
7 Archived 2011-07-20 at the Wayback Machine	March 4	Troy	12-4	Dudy Noble Field	Johnson (1-0)	Green	---	6363	6-1	
8 Archived 2011-07-20 at the Wayback Machine	March 6	UAB	12-10	Dudy Noble Field	Crosswhite (1-0)	Jones	---	5989	7-1	
9 Archived 2011-07-20 at the Wayback Machine	March 7	Jacksonville State	11-9	Dudy Noble Field	Lalor (1-0)	Clements	Bowen (1)	6123	8-1	
10 Archived 2011-07-20 at the Wayback Machine	March 9	vs. Winthrop	6-7	Baylor Ballpark	Mullins	Crosswhite (1-1)	Franzblau	2781	8-2	
11 Deprecated link archived 2013-01-29 at archive.today	March 10	at Baylor	8-6	Baylor Ballpark	Pigott (2-1)	Matthews	Houston (1)	3290	9-2	
12 Deprecated link archived 2013-01-29 at archive.today	March 11	vs. San Francisco	2-1	Baylor Ballpark	Johnson (2-0)	Dufloth	Bowen (2)	3060	10-2	
	March 13	at Texas-Arlington	Rained out							
13	March 14	at Dallas Baptist	8-11	Patriot Field	Goins	Whitney (1-1)	---	500	10-3	
14 Deprecated link archived 2013-01-29 at archive.today	March 16	at Florida	12-9	McKethan Stadium	Weatherford (3-0)	Porter	Lalor (1)	3281	11-3	1-0
15 Deprecated link archived 2013-01-29 at archive.today	March 17	at Florida	8-10	McKethan Stadium	Locke	Pigott (2-2)	Porter	3151	11-4	1-1
16 Deprecated link archived 2013-01-29 at archive.today	March 18	at Florida	14-13	McKethan Stadium	Crosswhite (2-1)	Keating	Moreland (1)	3316	12-4	2-1
17	March 21	Samford	7-6	Dudy Noble Field	Moreland (1-0)	Edens	---	1837	13-4	
18	March 23	South Carolina	3-20	Dudy Noble Field	Honeycutt	Weatherford (3-1)	---	6529	13-5	2-2
19 Deprecated link archived 2013-02-08 at archive.today	March 24	South Carolina	6-5	Dudy Noble Field	Bowen (2-0)	Johnson	---	6340	14-5	3-2
20 Deprecated link archived 2013-02-08 at archive.today	March 25	South Carolina	3-8	Dudy Noble Field	Jeffords	Johnson (2-1)	---	6145	14-6	3-3
21 Deprecated link archived 2013-01-29 at archive.today	March 27	Memphis	9-8	Dudy Noble Field	Bowen (3-0)	Davis	---	5662	15-6	
22 Deprecated link archived 2013-01-29 at archive.today	March 28	Memphis	11-9	Dudy Noble Field	Lalor (2-0)	Cupples	Bowen (3)	6075	16-6	
23	March 30	Kentucky	10-7	Dudy Noble Field	Houston (1-0)	Henry	Bowen (4)	8383	17-6	4-3
24	March 31	Kentucky	6-10	Dudy Noble Field	Albers	Pigott (2-3)	Lovett	10324	17-7	4-4
25 Deprecated link archived 2013-01-29 at archive.today	April 1	Kentucky	5-4	Dudy Noble Field	Moreland (2-0)	Ragle	---	6307	18-7	5-4
26	April 3	Louisiana-Monroe	17-7	Dudy Noble Field	Whitney (2-1)	Soignier	---	5951	19-7	
27 Deprecated link archived 2013-01-29 at archive.today	April 6	at Arkansas	11-9	Baum Stadium	Crosswhite (3-1)	Keuchel	---	7394	20-7	6-4
28 Deprecated link archived 2013-01-29 at archive.today	April 7	at Arkansas	2-1	Baum Stadium	Pigott (3-3)	Welker	---	7712	21-7	7-4
29 Deprecated link archived 2013-01-29 at archive.today	April 8	at Arkansas	3-9	Baum Stadium	Schmidt	Johnson (2-0)	---	7004	21-8	7-5
	April 10	at South Alabama	Rained out							
30	April 11	South Alabama	5-1	Trustmark Park	Whitney (3-1)	Turner	---	3370	22-8	
31	April 13	at Tennessee	4-3	Lindsey Nelson Stadium	Crosswhite (2-1)	Adkins	Weatherford (1)	2169	23-8	8-5
	April 14	at Tennessee	Rained out							
	April 15	at Tennessee	Rained out							
32 Deprecated link archived 2013-01-29 at archive.today	April 17	Ole Miss	14-9	Trustmark Park	Whitney (4-1)	Simpson	---	8012	24-8	
33	April 20	LSU	12-3	Dudy Noble Field	Crosswhite (5-1)	Furbush	---	7283	25-8	9-5
34 Deprecated link archived 2013-01-29 at archive.today	April 21	LSU	5-6	Dudy Noble Field	Forrest	Bowen (3-1)	Bradford	8006	25-9	9-6
35	April 22	LSU	1-3	Dudy Noble Field	Bradford	Weatherford (3-2)	Bertuccini	6736	25-10	9-7
36 Deprecated link archived 2013-01-29 at archive.today	April 24	Southern Miss	11-2	Dudy Noble Field	Whitney (5-1)	Cavenaugh	Lalor (2)	6361	26-10	
37 Deprecated link archived 2013-01-29 at archive.today	April 25	Southern Miss	7-4	Dudy Noble Field	Bowen (4-1)	Cashion	Weatherford (2)	5802	27-10	
38	April 27	at Ole Miss	7-17	Swayze Field	Bukvich	Crosswhite (5-2)	---	7638	27-11	9-8
39 Deprecated link archived 2013-01-29 at archive.today	April 28	at Ole Miss	1-5	Swayze Field	Lynn	Pigott (3-4)	---	7312	27-12	9-9
40	April 29	at Ole Miss	4-1	Swayze Field	Moreland (3-0)	Bittle	---	7087	28-12	10-9
41	May 4	Auburn	4-1	Dudy Noble Field	Crosswhite (6-2)	Crawford	Weatherford (3)	6534	29-12	11-9
42 Deprecated link archived 2013-01-29 at archive.today	May 5	Auburn	11-6	Dudy Noble Field	Pigott (4-4)	Thompson	---	6980	30-12	12-9
43	May 6	Auburn	9-5	Dudy Noble Field	Bowen (5-1)	Butts	---	6371	31-12	13-9
44	May 8	at Austin Peay	2-3	Raymond C. Hand Park	Kole	Lalor (2-1)	---	601	31-13	
45 Deprecated link archived 2013-01-29 at archive.today	May 9	at Austin Peay	5-7	Raymond C. Hand Park	Lykins	Houston (1-1)	Kole	662	31-14	
46 Deprecated link archived 2013-01-29 at archive.today	May 11	at Georgia	4-2	Foley Field	Crosswhite (7-2)	Dodson	Lalor (3)	1412	32-14	14-9
47 Deprecated link archived 2013-01-29 at archive.today	May 13	at Georgia	1-2	Foley Field	Moreau	Pigott (4-5)	Fields	1325	32-15	14-10
48 Deprecated link archived 2013-01-29 at archive.today	May 13	at Georgia	3-5	Foley Field	Holder	Bowen (5-2)	Fields	1325	32-16	14-11
	May 15	Arkansas-Little Rock	Rained out							
49	May 17	Alabama	3-4	Dudy Noble Field	Hunter	Crosswhite (7-3)	---	6267	32-17	14-12
50 Deprecated link archived 2013-01-29 at archive.today	May 18	Alabama	9-3	Dudy Noble Field	Pigott (5-5)	Quigley	---	6972	33-17	15-12
51 Deprecated link archived 2013-01-29 at archive.today	May 19	Alabama	7-9	Dudy Noble Field	Stroup	Johnson (2-3)	Hyatt	7181	33-18	15-13

SEC tournament - Hoover, Alabama

#	Date	Opponent	Score	Site/stadium	Win	Loss	Save	Attendance	Record
52	May 23	Ole Miss	1-3	Regions Park	Kline	Pigott (5-6)	---	6192	33-19
53 Deprecated link archived 2013-01-29 at archive.today	May 24	Vanderbilt	2-3	Regions Park	Price	Crosswhite (7-4)	---	5782	33-20

NCAA Regionals -Tallahassee, Florida

#	Date	Opponent	Score	Site/stadium	Win	Loss	Save	Attendance	Record
54 Deprecated link archived 2013-01-29 at archive.today	June 1	Stetson	6-3	Dick Howser Stadium	Crosswhite (8-4)	Ingoglia	Bowen (5)	2701	34-20
55	June 2	Florida State	3-0	Dick Howser Stadium	Pigott (6-6)	Henry	Weatherford (4)	4088	35-20
56	June 3	Florida State	9-4	Dick Howser Stadium	Johnson (3-3)	Rosen	---	3714	36-20

NCAA Super Regionals - Starkville, Mississippi

#	Date	Opponent	Score	Site/stadium	Win	Loss	Save	Attendance	Record
57	June 8	Clemson	8-6	Dudy Noble Field	Lalor (3-1)	Moskos	Weatherford (5)	12620	37-20
58 Deprecated link archived 2013-01-29 at archive.today	June 9	Clemson	8-5	Dudy Noble Field	Pigott (7-6)	Kopp	Moreland (2)	13715	38-20

College World Series - Omaha, Nebraska

#	Date	Opponent	Score	Site/stadium	Win	Loss	Save	Attendance	Record
59 Deprecated link archived 2013-01-29 at archive.today	June 15	North Carolina	5-8	Rosenblatt Stadium	Warren	Pigott (7-7)	Carignan	23568	38-21
60 Deprecated link archived 2013-01-29 at archive.today	June 17	Louisville	4-12	Rosenblatt Stadium	Marks	Crosswhite (8-5)	---	18187	38-22

== See also ==
- Mississippi State Bulldogs
- Mississippi State Bulldogs baseball
