= Trayon =

Trayon is a male given name. Notable people with the name include:

== Notable people ==
- Trayon Bobb (born 1993), Guyanese politician
- Trayon White (born 1984), American politician

== See also ==
- Travon, a page for people with the given name "Travon"
