= Leftfield (disambiguation) =

Leftfield are a British electronic music group.

Leftfield or Left Field may also refer to:

- Left field, a position in baseball
- The Left Field, an event at a number of British music festivals
- Left Field Lounge, the area beyond the stadium fence at Mississippi State University
- Leftfield Magazine, the magazine of Scottish Socialist Youth
- Left Field Productions, a former American video game development studio

== See also ==
- Out of left field, American slang for "out of nowhere", "unexpectedly", "strange"
