= Left Field Lounge =

Area at Polk-DeMent Stadium, Mississippi, US

Coordinates: 33.463758°N 88.794054°W

The Left Field Lounge is the area beyond the outfield fence in Dudy Noble Field, Polk-DeMent Stadium at Mississippi State University. It has been named the "#1 place to watch college baseball", and among the "100 things you gotta do before you graduate" by Sports Illustrated.

The author John Grisham, alumnus of Mississippi State and fan of MSU college baseball wrote an introduction about his time at MSU and in the Left Field Lounge in his book Inside Dudy Noble: A Celebration of Mississippi State Baseball.

The Left Field Lounge started in the 1960s with fans driving cars and trucks into the area to watch a game. Russ Rogers, a Starkville native, was the first to drive a pickup in to the left field and set up shop. In the late 1960s, fans started bringing grills, tables, and ice chests full of drinks for a full tailgate party experience. At that time, fans would drive in before the game to set up their tailgates, and then take it all down after the game and drive back out. As the area became more popular, a line would form to get in before the game, the area would fill up, and some would be turned away.

A 2003 article by a Mississippi State alumnus describes the evolving tradition: "In the early 1970s one truck driven to the Left Field Lounge would not start and was unable to leave after the game was over, so the owners just left the truck there. For the next game, the truck was still there, creating what was essentially a reserved spot. Other fans picked up on this idea and brought in trucks and grills with the intention of leaving them there. Some trucks that were no longer functional were towed into a spot. To allow more fans to share a space, home-built seats and bleachers were built in the beds of some of the trucks. Later, motorhomes and flatbed trailers were brought in with more elaborate and sturdy bleachers. Eventually, the university established rules for the spots in Left Field Lounge. Spaces were rented for the season, and after all of the spaces were filled, those not receiving a space were placed on a waiting list. The trucks/trailers/motorhomes had been on wheels, brought in by a certain day before the season started, and removed after the season ended."

== NCAA Record Attendance ==
SEC weekend games typically draw the largest crowds, giving rise to large weekend gatherings. Mississippi State holds the NCAA record for the largest single-game on-campus baseball attendance at 15,586 and the largest SEC crowd for a 3-game weekend series at 29,915. In 2007 versus the Clemson Tigers, MSU had the NCAA's top two all-time highest attended Super Regional games with 12,620 and 13,715 fans.

Mississippi State has all of the top 11 on-campus crowds in the history of college baseball. Overall, DNF-PDS has held 15 crowds over 12,000 and 31 crowds over 10,000.

=== Top Baseball Crowds at DNF-PDS ===
Rank	Attendance	Opponent	Date	Record Broken
1	16,423	Ole Miss	April 15, 2023	NCAA On-Campus Record
2	15,586	Ole Miss	April 12, 2014	
3	15,078	Texas A&M	April 16, 2016	
4	14,991	Florida	April 22, 1989	
5	14,739	Ole Miss	April 14, 2023	
6	14,562	Auburn	April 20, 2013	
7	14,556	LSU	April 16, 1988	
8	14,385	Notre Dame	June 12, 2021	NCAA Super Regional Single-Game Record
9	14,320	Arizona State	February 25, 2023	
10	14,228	LSU	April 9, 2022	
11	14,077	Alabama	March 26, 2022	
12	13,971	Notre Dame	June 13, 2021	#2 NCAA Super Regional Single-Game Record
13	13,761	Arkansas	April 25, 1992	
14	13,715	Clemson	June 9, 2007	
15	13,617	Georgia	April 8, 2006	
16	13,351	Long Beach State	February 19, 2022	
17	13,338	Ole Miss	April 17, 2021	First home series after lifting of COVID-19 restrictions
18	13,324	Ole Miss	April 11, 2014	
19	13,123	Ole Miss	April 15, 2000	
20	12,927	Vanderbilt	March 25, 2023	
21	12,824	Ole Miss	April 16, 2023	
22	12,708	Auburn	April 24, 1993	
23	12,620	Clemson	June 8, 2007	
24	12,360	Georgia	April 6, 2002	
25	12,357	South Carolina	April 1, 2023	
26	12,346	Auburn	April 15, 2022	
27	12,297	Florida	May 7, 2022	
28	12,213	VMI	February 18, 2023	
