= Trevon =

Trevon is a given name. Notable people with the given name include:

- Trevon Allen (born 1998), American basketball player
- Trevon Bluiett (born 1994), American basketball player
- Trevon Coley (born 1994), American football player
- Trevon Diggs (born 1998), American football player
- Trevon Duval (born 1998), American basketball player
- Trevon Garraway (born 1984), Guyanese cricketer
- Trevon Griffith (born 1991), Guyanese cricketer
- Trevon Grimes (born 1998), American football player
- Trevon Hartfield (born 1991), American football player
- Trévon Hughes (born 1987), American basketball player
- Trevon Jenifer (born 1988), American Paralympic basketball player
- Trevon Logan, American economist
- Trevon Moehrig (born 1999), American football player
- Trevon Scott (born 1996), American basketball player
- Trevon Tate (born 1996), American football player
- Trevon Wesco (born 1996), American football player
- Trevon Young (born 1995), American football player

== See also ==
- Tre'Von Johnson (born 1995), American football player
- Treveon, a page for people with the given name "Treveon"
- Travon, a page for people with the given name "Travon"
- Trayvon, a page for people with the given name "Trayvon"
