= 2007 Southeastern Conference baseball tournament =

- Teams: 8
- Format: Two pools of four-team double elimination
- Finals site: Regions Park; Hoover, Alabama
- Champions: Vanderbilt (2nd title)
- Winning coach: Tim Corbin (1st title)
- MVP: Pedro Alvarez (Vanderbilt)
- Attendance: 87,893

2007 Southeastern Conference baseball standings
	Conf.				Overall
Team	W		L	PCT	W		L	PCT
Eastern
No. 9 Vanderbilt ^{x}‍†‍‡‍^{y}	22	–	8	.733	54	–	13	.806
No. 10 South Carolina ‍‍‍^{y}	17	–	13	.567	46	–	20	.697
Florida ‍‍‍	15	–	15	.500	29	–	30	.492
Tennessee ‍‍‍	13	–	15	.464	34	–	25	.576
Kentucky ‍‍‍	13	–	16	.448	34	–	19	.642
Georgia ‍‍‍	11	–	19	.367	23	–	33	.411
Western
No. 21 Arkansas ^{x}‍‍‍^{y}	18	–	12	.600	43	–	21	.672
No. 8 Mississippi State ‍‍‍^{y}	15	–	13	.536	38	–	22	.633
No. 17 Ole Miss ‍‍‍^{y}	16	–	14	.533	40	–	25	.615
Alabama ‍‍‍	15	–	15	.500	31	–	26	.544
LSU ‍‍‍	12	–	17	.414	29	–	26	.527
Auburn ‍‍‍	10	–	20	.333	31	–	25	.554
x – Division champion † – Conference champion ‡ – Tournament champion y – Invited to the NCAA tournament As of June 30, 2007; Rankings from Coaches' Poll

The 2007 Southeastern Conference baseball tournament was held at Hoover Metropolitan Stadium in Hoover, AL from May 23 through 27. After being ranked #1 nationally for most of the season and taking the regular-season SEC crown, Vanderbilt won the tournament and earned the Southeastern Conference's automatic bid to the 2007 NCAA Division I baseball tournament.

This year marked the first time since 1984 LSU did not qualify for the tournament. The Bayou Bengals struggled to a 12–17–1 SEC record under first-year coach Paul Mainieri and finished 29–26–1 overall, LSU's lowest win total since 1983, the year before Skip Bertman came to Baton Rouge.

== Regular season results ==
Eastern Division
Team	W	L	T	Pct	GB	Seed
Vanderbilt	22	8		.733	–	1
South Carolina	17	13		.567	5	3
Florida	15	15		.500	7	6
Tennessee	13	15		.464	8	8
Kentucky	13	16	1	.450	8.5	–
Georgia	11	19		.367	11	–

Western Division
Team	W	L	T	Pct	GB	Seed
Arkansas	18	12		.600	–	2
Mississippi State	15	13		.536	2	4
Ole Miss	16	14		.533	2	5
Alabama	15	15		.500	3	7
LSU	12	17	1	.417	5.5	–
Auburn	10	20		.333	8	–

== Tournament ==
First round
7	Alabama	0
2	Arkansas	6
6	Florida	3*
3	South Carolina	4*
7	Alabama	2
6	Florida	3
8	Tennessee	6
1	Vanderbilt	4
5	Ole Miss	3
4	Mississippi State	1
1	Vanderbilt	3
4	Mississippi State	2

Second round
2	Arkansas	6
3	South Carolina	0
6	Florida	3
3	South Carolina	5
8	Tennessee	3
5	Ole Miss	6
1	Vanderbilt	15
8	Tennessee	2

Semifinals
2	Arkansas	3	-
3	South Carolina	2	-
5	Ole Miss	1~	6*
1	Vanderbilt	13~	7*

Finals
2	Arkansas	4
1	Vanderbilt	7

- ~ Game was shortened by 10-run rule.
- * Game went into extra innings.
- LSU, Kentucky, Auburn and Georgia did not make the tournament.

== All-Tournament Team ==
Position	Player	School
1B	Danny Hamblin	Arkansas
2B	Tony Delmonico	Tennessee
3B	Pedro Alvarez	Vanderbilt
SS	Ryan Flaherty	Vanderbilt
C	Shea Robin	Vanderbilt
OF	Dominic de la Osa	Vanderbilt
OF	Casey Coon	Arkansas
OF	Justin Henry	Ole Miss
DH	Jeff Lockwood	Tennessee
P	Jess Todd	Arkansas
P	Nick Schmidt	Arkansas
MVP	Pedro Alvarez	Vanderbilt

== See also ==
- College World Series
- NCAA Division I Baseball Championship
- Southeastern Conference baseball tournament
