= Travon =

Travon is a given name. Notable people with the name include:

- Travon Bellamy (born 1988), American football player
- Travon Broadway Jr. (born 1997), American basketball player
- Travon Bryant (born 1983), American basketball coach and former player
- Travon Free (born 1984/1985), American comedian and basketball player
- Travon McMillian (born 1996), American football player
- Travon Potts (born 1970), American songwriter and producer
- Travon Smart (1997–2018), American rapper
- Travon Van (born 1991), American football player
- Travon Walker (born 2000), American football player

== See also ==
- Trayvon
- Trevon
