= Travon Broadway Jr. =

American basketball player

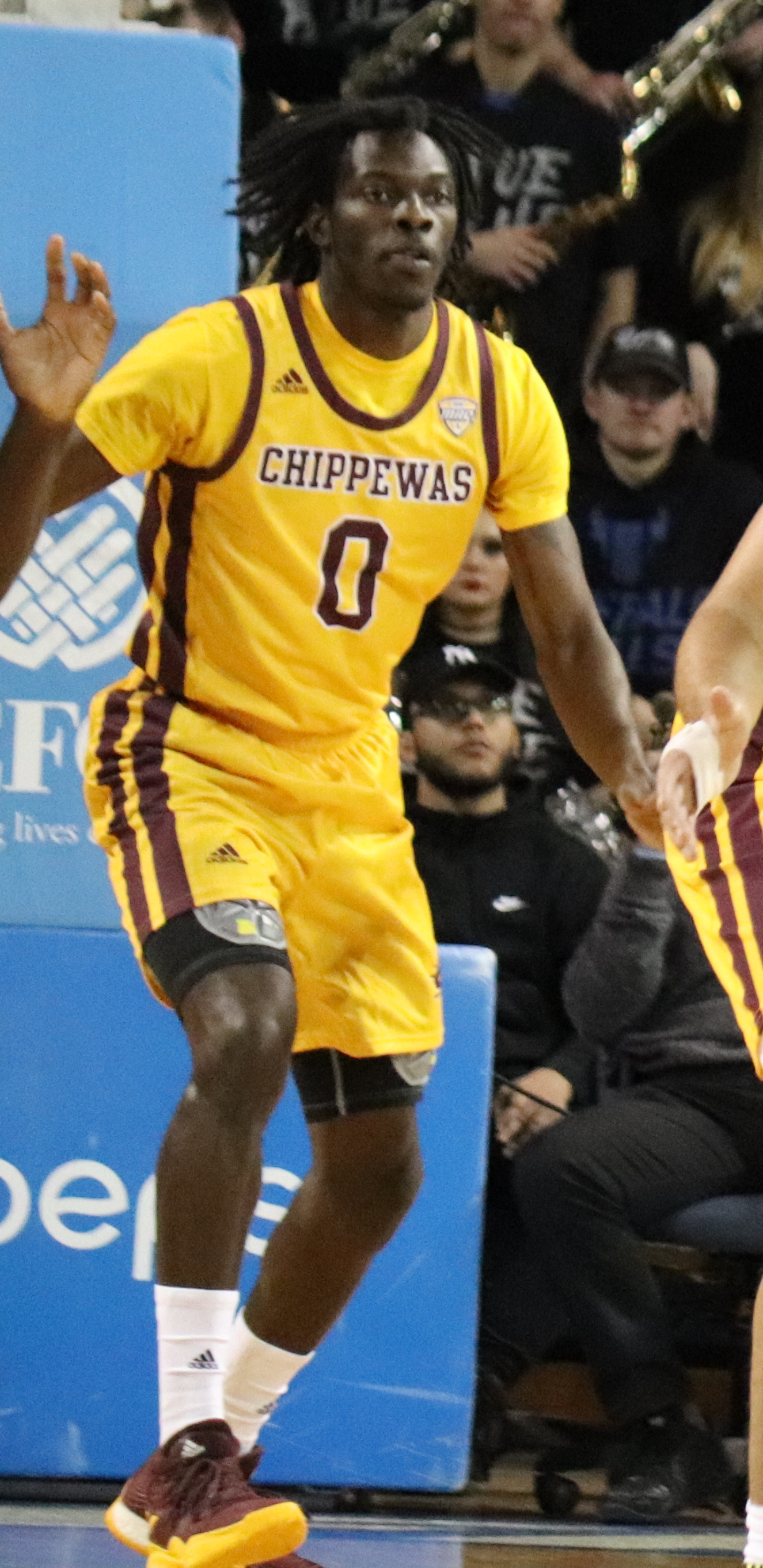
- Broadway playing for Central Michigan in 2020

Kozuv
- Position: Shooting guard
- League: Macedonian First League

Personal information
- Born: December 2, 1997 (age 28) Miami, Florida, U.S.
- Listed height: 6 ft 5 in (1.96 m)
- Listed weight: 182 lb (83 kg)

Career information
- High school: Coral Springs Christian Academy (Coral Springs, Florida); Washington Academy (Greenville, North Carolina)
- College: St. Petersburg (2017–2018); Iowa Western CC (2018–2019); Central Michigan (2019–2021)
- NBA draft: 2021: undrafted
- Playing career: 2021–present

Career history
- 2021: KK MZT Skopje
- 2022–present: KK Kožuv

Travon Marcel Broadway Jr. (born December 2, 1997) is an American professional basketball player for Newcastle Eagles of the British Basketball League. He played college basketball for the St. Petersburg Titans, the Iowa Western CC Reivers, and the Central Michigan Chippewas.

== High school career ==
Broadway attended Coral Springs Christian Academy, playing under coach Gavin Felix. He averaged 20.8 points, 3.1 assists and 7.2 rebounds per game as a senior and was named to the 2016 All-Broward County second team. Broadway did a postgraduate season at Washington Academy in Greenville, North Carolina.

== College career ==
Broadway played for St. Petersburg College during his freshman season and averaged 14.2 points and 6.1 rebounds per game. He subsequently played his sophomore season for Iowa Western Community College. As a sophomore, he averaged 16.6 points and 4.3 rebounds per game. Following the season, Broadway transferred to Central Michigan. He averaged 7.1 points and 2.8 rebounds per game as a junior. As a senior, Broadway averaged 17.9 points, 5.4 rebounds, and 1.8 assists per game. His season was cut short by injuries and he chose not to take advantage of the additional year of eligibility granted by the NCAA due to the COVID-19 pandemic.

== Professional career ==
On July 22, 2021, Broadway signed his first professional contract with KK TFT of the Macedonian First League. He averaged 9.8 points, 3.5 rebounds, and 1.4 steals per game. On January 3, 2022, Broadway signed with KK Kožuv.

== Career statistics ==
Legend
GP	Games played	GS	Games started	MPG	Minutes per game
FG%	Field goal percentage	3P%	3-point field goal percentage	FT%	Free throw percentage
RPG	Rebounds per game	APG	Assists per game	SPG	Steals per game
BPG	Blocks per game	PPG	Points per game	**Bold**	Career high

=== College ===
==== NCAA Division I ====
Year	Team	GP	GS	MPG	FG%	3P%	FT%	RPG	APG	SPG	BPG	PPG
2019–20	Central Michigan	**32**	14	20.7	.388	.312	.658	2.8	1.1	1.1	**.1**	7.1
2020–21	Central Michigan	18	**18**	**29.9**	**.465**	**.370**	**.720**	**5.4**	**1.8**	**1.7**	**.1**	**17.9**
Career		50	32	24.0	.429	.340	.695	3.8	1.3	1.3	.1	11.0

==== JUCO ====
Year	Team	GP	GS	MPG	FG%	3P%	FT%	RPG	APG	SPG	BPG	PPG
2017–18	St. Petersburg	28	10	**23.8**	**.467**	.279	**.761**	**6.1**	1.7	**2.1**	.1	14.2
2018–19	Iowa Western CC	**30**	**28**	19.5	.450	**.311**	.733	4.3	**2.7**	1.7	**.2**	**16.6**
Career		58	38	21.6	.458	.299	.745	5.2	2.2	1.9	.1	15.4
