= Matt den Dekker =

American baseball player and coach (born 1987)

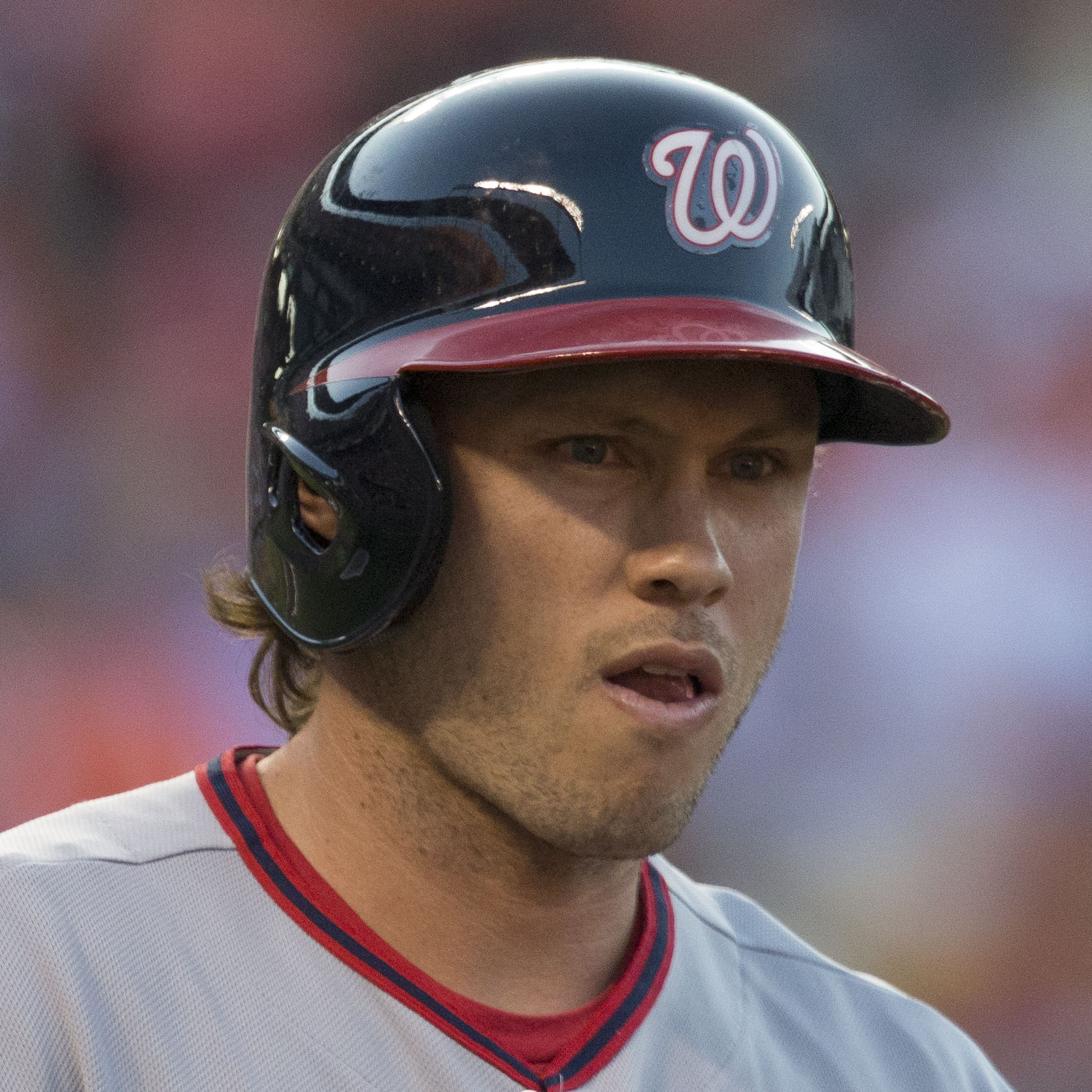
- den Dekker with the Washington Nationals in 2015
- Outfielder
- Born: August 10, 1987 (age 39); Fort Lauderdale, Florida, U.S.
- Batted: Left Threw: Left

MLB debut
- August 29, 2013, for the New York Mets

Last MLB appearance
- July 26, 2018, for the New York Mets

MLB statistics
- Batting average: .223
- Home runs: 7
- Runs batted in: 30
- Stats at Baseball Reference

Teams
- New York Mets (2013–2014); Washington Nationals (2015–2016); Detroit Tigers (2017); New York Mets (2018)

Matthew Gerrit den Dekker (born August 10, 1987) is an American professional baseball coach and former outfielder, who is the minor league baserunning and outfielding coach for the New York Mets. He played college baseball at Florida for coach Kevin O'Sullivan from 2007 to 2010 and played in Major League Baseball (MLB) for 6 seasons from 2013 to 2018 for the Washington Nationals, Detroit Tigers and New York Mets.

Den Dekker was born in Fort Lauderdale, Florida. He attended Coral Springs Christian Academy and Westminster Academy Christian School. After graduation from high school in 2006, den Dekker enrolled at the University of Florida and played outfield for the Gators, starting for four seasons. As a senior in 2010, den Dekker helped lead the Gators to the 2010 College World Series.

The Pittsburgh Pirates selected den Dekker in the sixteenth round of the 2009 Major League Baseball draft, but he elected to return to Florida for his senior season. He was then drafted in the fifth round of the 2010 Major League Baseball draft by the New York Mets. He played 6 years as an outfielder in the MLB, with the Mets from 2013 to 2014, the Washington Nationals from 2015 to 2016, the Detroit Tigers in 2017 before returning to the Mets in 2018.

Den Dekker returned to Florida in 2019 to resume his schooling, while also becoming a student assistant coach for the Gators. In 2020, den Dekker was named the hitting and outfielding coach for the Charleston Southern Buccaneers.

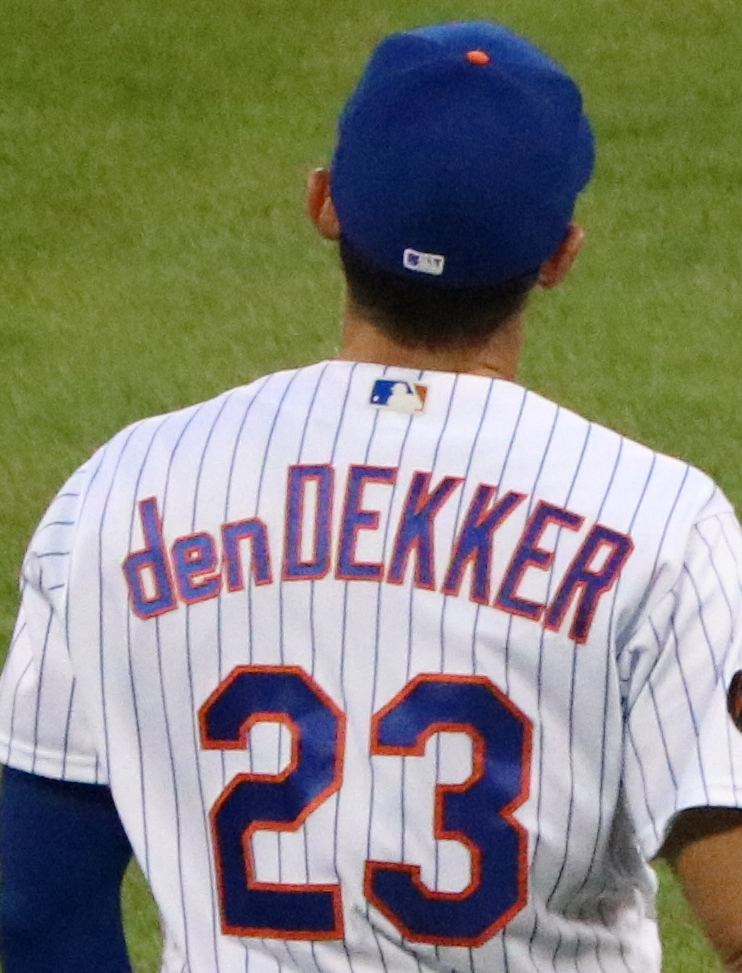
Along with former teammates Jacob deGrom and Travis d'Arnaud, den Dekker was one of few MLB players to have lowercase letters on his jersey.

== Early life ==
Matt den Dekker was born in Fort Lauderdale, Florida. He has an older brother and a younger sister.

== Amateur career ==
Matt den Dekker
Medal record

Men's baseball

Representing United States

World University Championship
Gold medal – first place	2008 Brno	National team

After his freshman year of high school, den Dekker transferred from Coral Springs Christian Academy to Westminster Academy Christian School in Fort Lauderdale, in order to play outfield and pitch alongside his cousin, Westminster's ace pitcher, Kevin Chapman. den Dekker also played with future Washington Nationals teammate Michael A. Taylor at Westminster when the former was a senior and the latter was a freshman. As a junior, den Dekker finished with a .350 batting average and was named to the Miami Herald's All-Broward County First Team. However, the few college recruiters who showed interest were mostly small schools that wanted him to pitch. Den Dekker's only Division I scholarship offer came from a University of Florida recruiter who had attended Westminster's practices and games only to scout Chapman.

When Chapman signed on to play college baseball for the Florida Gators, den Dekker quickly followed suit. As a freshman, he batted .234/.324/.418. As a sophomore, den Dekker hit .333/.413/.507 with 20 steals in 20 tries and 55 runs in 55 games. The center fielder was a first-team All-Southeastern Conference selection as an outfielder. Den Dekker was then chosen for Team USA's college edition. He batted .176/.375/.176 in the 2008 Haarlem Baseball Week; noted for his defense, he made one error and noted for his speed, he was thrown out in his lone attempt (gunned down by Cuban defensive legend Ariel Pestano in the gold medal game). Den Dekker batted .227/.292/.409 in the 2008 World University Baseball Championship, and did not attempt a steal.

Den Dekker hit .296/.409/.412 as a junior with 17 steals in 18 tries. He was still rated 92nd overall by Baseball America among prospects entering the 2009 Major League Baseball draft – then was not selected until the 475th overall pick, when the Pittsburgh Pirates selected him in the 16th round. He returned to Florida for his senior year, hitting .358 with a team-leading 64 runs scored and a career-best 49 runs batted in as the Gators reached the 2010 College World Series.

== Professional career ==
=== New York Mets ===
After college, den Dekker was selected by the New York Mets in the fifth round of the 2010 Major League Baseball draft. He made his pro debut that summer with the Gulf Coast League Mets, hitting .278 with five RBIs in five games before being promoted to the Savannah Sand Gnats. In 2011, den Dekker played for the St. Lucie Mets and Binghamton Mets. He was invited to spring training in 2012.

In 2013, den Dekker received his third invitation to the Mets Spring training camp. He played in a career-high 19 games and posted a .205 batting average as he went 9-for-44 with one home run and seven runs batted in while striking out 16 times. On March 24, den Dekker broke his right wrist attempting to make a play on a fly ball hit by Detroit Tigers outfielder Austin Jackson.

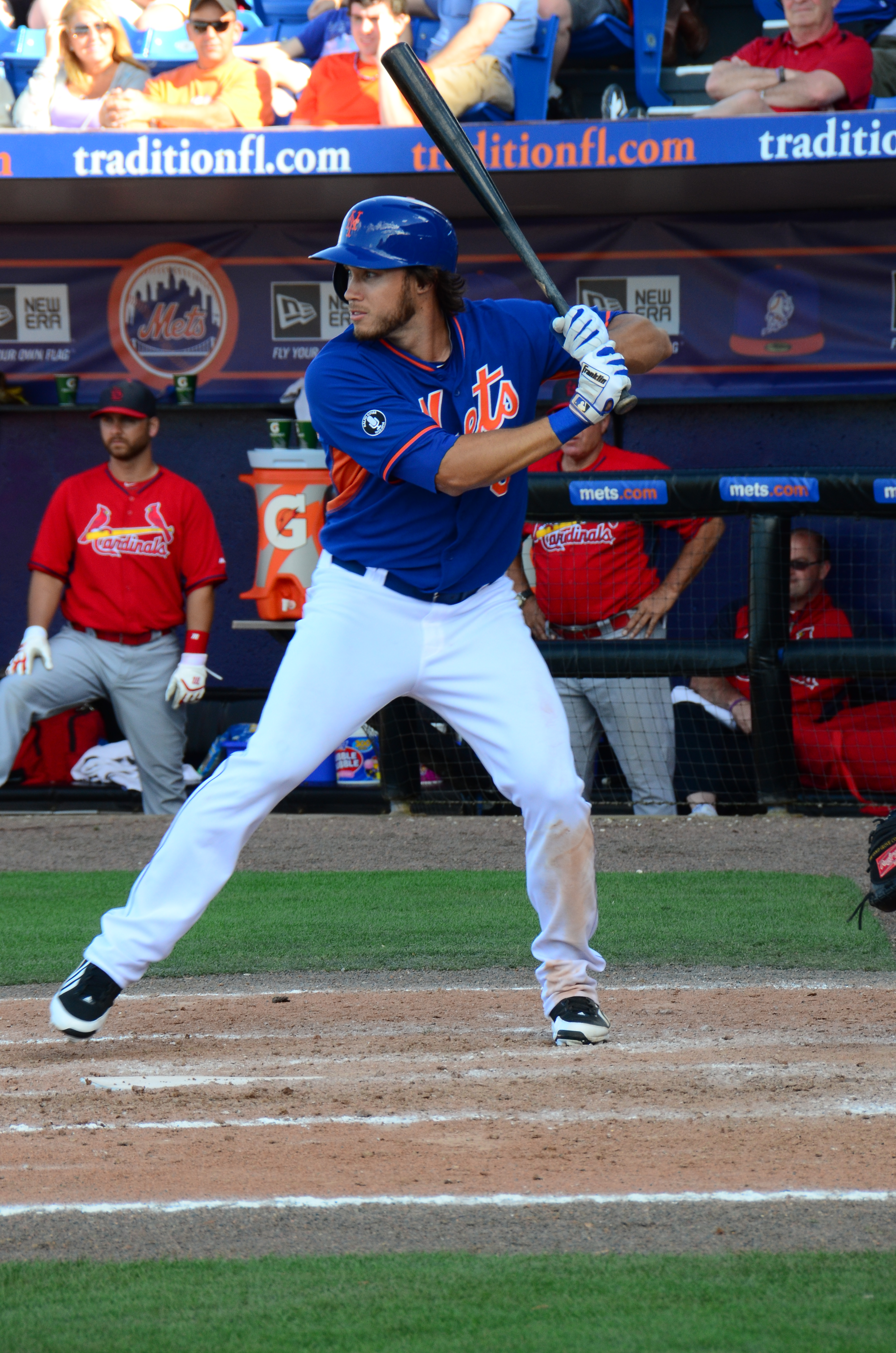
den Dekker with the Mets in 2014

On August 27, the Mets promoted den Dekker to the major leagues. He made his major league debut on August 29. He hit his first MLB home run on September 1, off Ross Ohlendorf of the Washington Nationals. For the season, he batted .207/.270/.276.

=== Washington Nationals ===
On March 30, 2015, the Mets traded den Dekker to the Washington Nationals for pitcher Jerry Blevins.

Den Dekker was optioned to the Syracuse Chiefs at the end of Spring Training on April 1, 2016. He was recalled on April 6 when Ben Revere was placed on the disabled list. After the Nationals optioned him back to Syracuse later in the season, den Dekker hit just .208 before being taken off the 40-man roster and outrighted to the minors on September 3. For the season, he batted .176/.282/.294. He elected free agency following the season on November 7.

=== Miami Marlins ===
On November 30, 2016, den Dekker signed a minor league contract with the Miami Marlins organization. On May 2, 2017, he opted out of his contract, becoming a free agent.

=== Detroit Tigers ===
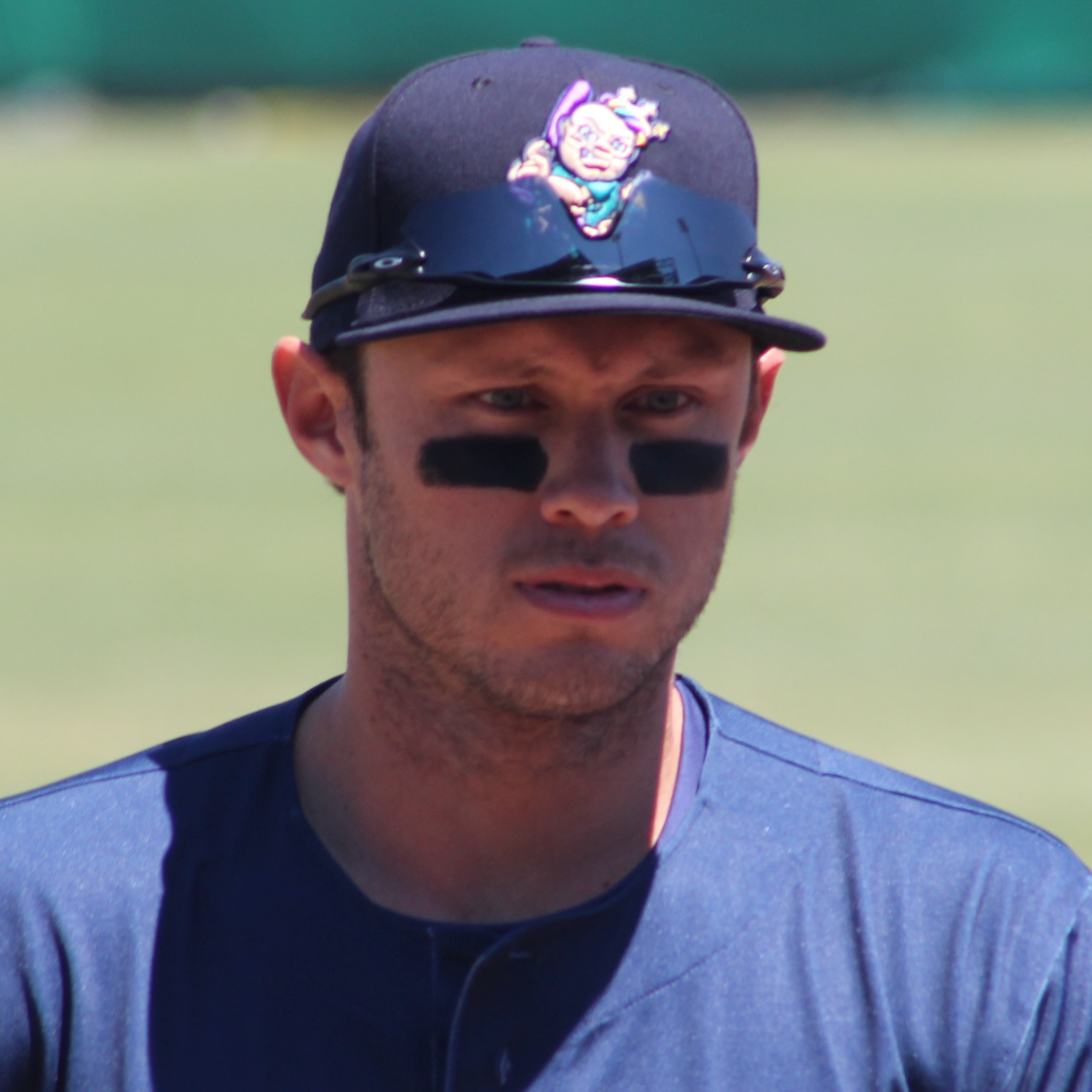
Den Dekker with the New Orleans Baby Cakes in 2017

On May 16, 2017, den Dekker signed a minor league deal with the Detroit Tigers. He was called up by the Tigers on June 23. On July 5, 2017, he was designated for assignment and sent outright to the Toledo Mud Hens four days later. For the season, he batted 1-for-7. After the 2017 season, den Dekker elected free agency.

=== Return to the New York Mets ===
On February 15, 2018, den Dekker returned to the New York Mets, signing a minor league contract with an invitation to Spring Training. Den Dekker had his contract selected on July 11, 2018. He was designated for assignment on July 27, 2018. On October 2, 2018, he elected to become a free agent.

=== Long Island Ducks ===
On March 26, 2019, den Dekker signed with the Long Island Ducks of the independent Atlantic League of Professional Baseball. On June 7, he announced his retirement from professional baseball. In 29 games he hit .268/.336/.446 with 2 home runs, 12 RBIs and 4 stolen bases.

== Coaching career ==
On June 10, 2020, den Dekker was named to the coaching staff at Charleston Southern University.

== Personal life ==
Den Dekker's cousin Kevin Chapman is a former major league pitcher.
