= Trayvon =

Trayvon is a male given name.

== Notable people ==
- Trayvon Bromell (born 1995), American track and field athlete
- Trayvon Henderson (born 1995), American football player
- Trayvon Lathan (born 1984), American basketball player
- Trayvon Martin (1995–2012), American social figure
- Trayvon Mullen (born 1997), American football player
- Trayvon Palmer (born 1994), American basketball player
- Trayvon Reed (born 1995), American basketball player
- Trayvon Robinson (born 1987), American baseball player
- TrayVonn Wright (born 1991), American basketball player

== See also ==
- Travon, a page for people with the given name "Travon"
- Trevon, a page for people with the given name "Trevon"
