= Dudy Noble Field, Polk–DeMent Stadium =

Baseball park at Mississippi State University

Polk-DeMent Stadium
- "The Dude" "Carnegie Hall of College Baseball"
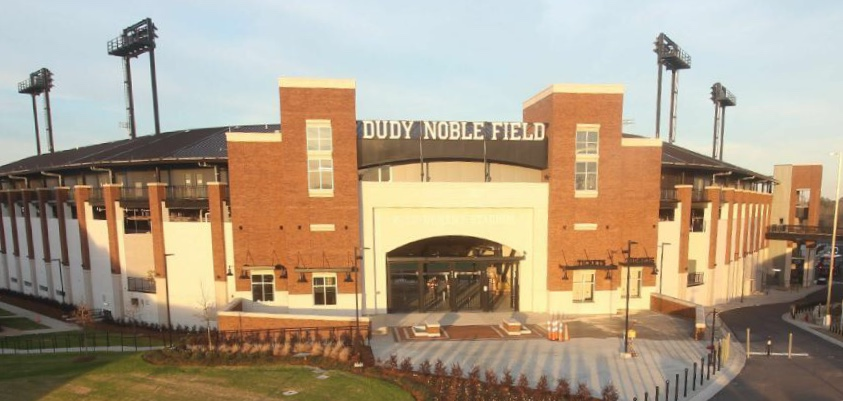

- Location in Mississippi Location in the United States
- Full name: Dudy Noble Field at Polk–Dement Stadium
- Former names: Dudy Noble Field (1967–1998)
- Address: 145 Lakeview Drive
- Location: Mississippi State, MS, United States
- Coordinates: 33.4628°N 88.7944°W
- Capacity: 15,000
- Executive suites: 3
- Type: Stadium
- Event: Baseball
- Surface: Tiflawn & Tifway II Bermuda Grass
- Scoreboard: 43 feet wide by 60 feet high
- Record attendance: 16,423 (current NCAA on-campus record); April 15, 2023, vs Ole Miss
- Field size: LF: 330 ft (100.6 m); LC: 376 ft (114.6 m); CF: 390 ft (118.9 m); RC: 374 ft (114.0 m); RF: 305 ft (93.0 m)
- Acreage: 12

Construction
- Opened: April 3, 1967
- Renovated: 1987, 2018
- Demolished: 2017
- Architects: Wier Boerner Allin; Populous; Janet Marie Smith
- Project manager: ICM
- General contractors: W.G. Yates & Sons (original); JESCO Construction, Inc. (current)

Tenant
- Mississippi State Bulldogs (1967–Present)

Website
- spark.adobe.com/page/TMH93dVe2rYp3/

Dudy Noble Field at Polk-Dement Stadium is a baseball park on the campus of Mississippi State University, just outside the city limits of Starkville, Mississippi, which serves as the home venue of the Mississippi State Bulldogs baseball team. DNF-PDS has been the setting of Southeastern Conference tournaments and NCAA Regional and Super Regional Championships, and it holds the current NCAA baseball on-campus single-game attendance record at 16,423. It is known for the Left Field Lounge.

== History ==
Mississippi State has been playing baseball at the present stadium site for 50 years, dating back to April 3, 1967, and a 5–3 Mississippi State win over Illinois Wesleyan.

What today stands as one of college baseball's top facilities grew in large part from the labors of Tom D'Armi, chief assistant coach to longtime Bulldog skipper Paul Gregory. When the tin-roofed grandstand and bleachers seating more than 2,000 were moved to the stadium's present site in the mid-1960s, it became D'Armi's task to "build" the new field. The task of hauling in and leveling top soil, planting and nurturing the turf, building the bullpens, placing signs on the outfield fence and planting the cedar trees beyond the outfield fence, fell to D'Armi. The hard work didn't go unrecognized. The field was subsequently honored by the U.S. Groundskeeper's Association as the nation's best maintained athletic field.

The facility was constructed on schedule by W.G. Yates & Sons of Philadelphia, Miss.

The Bulldog Club, MSU's athletic fund-raising body, shouldered a $2 million bonding program to account for the biggest portion of the project, with the remainder financed by alumni and friends through the sale of $1,000, $500 and $250 chairback seats, honorary deeds to plots of Dudy Noble Field turf, and other general donations.

For the book Inside Dudy Noble, A Celebration of Mississippi State Baseball, MSU alumnus John Grisham wrote an introduction about his time at MSU and in the Left Field Lounge.

The infield and portions of the adjoining outfield areas have in recent years been resodded, the infield dirt replaced, and the pitcher's mound rebuilt.

The green padding on the facing of the stadium wall was replaced prior to the 2002 season, and a new flooring material has been installed in both dugouts and the tunnels leading to them. The Bulldog locker room has been completely recarpeted, improved lighting added and new lockers installed, one of many projects funded by the four-year-old MSU Dugout Club.

Early in the 2004 season a speaker system was added near the concession stand area, while a new state-of-the-art scoreboard/message center was installed in the middle of the season beyond the existing scoreboard.

Also begun during the final week of the 2004 home season was the installation of wrought iron fencing and gates beneath the grandstand.

Additional stadium improvements are on the drawing board, all part of Mississippi State's commitment to maintain Dudy Noble Field, Polk–DeMent Stadium as the consummate collegiate ballpark for players and spectators alike.

In 2007 Dudy Noble held the largest crowd in super regional history of 13,715 in a victory over the Clemson Tigers that sent the Bulldogs to the College World Series in Omaha, NE.

Following the 2008 Season, a new larger Hi-Def video board replaced the 4-year old smaller screen along with a covering for the back of the scoreboard which displays the current year's baseball schedule. Planned renovations for the summer of 2009 include replacing all the out-dated drainage and pump systems below the field and all grass on the field.

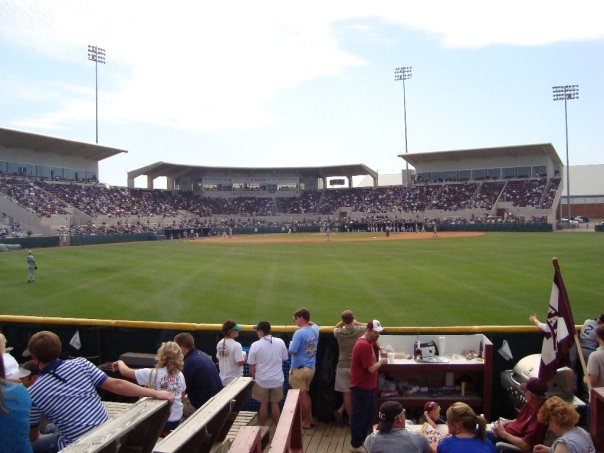
Old Dudy Noble Field from the outfield, 2013

In March 2013, Dudy Noble debuted a new mobile concessions ordering service — dawgsnax.com — with in-seat food delivery for fans in the grandstand seating area.

In 2017, Dudy Noble was mostly leveled to make way for an all-new Dudy Noble Field, which was completed for the 2019 season.

== The Left Field Lounge ==
The Left Field Lounge is the area beyond the outfield fence. It is unique in college baseball, and has enabled the grounds to be named the "#1 place to watch college baseball" and among the "100 things you gotta do before you graduate" by Sports Illustrated. In 2009 the lounge was named "the country's best tailgating experience" (among all sports venues) by ESPN Magazine.

== Championships ==
Dudy Noble Field has hosted four SEC tournaments (1979, 1981, 1983, and 1988), one SEC Western Division Tournament (1995), three NCAA District III tournaments (1973-75), 16 NCAA Regional tournaments (1979, 1984, 1985, 1987, 1988, 1989, 1990, 1992, 1997, 2000, 2003, 2013, 2016, 2019, 2021, and 2026), and 4 Super Regionals (2007, 2016, 2019 and 2021.)

== Attendance ==
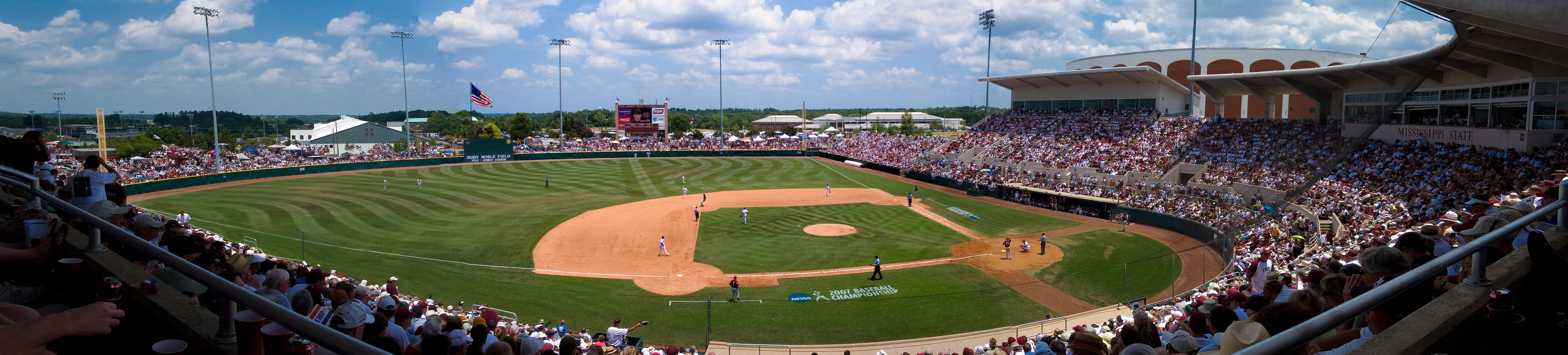
Dudy Noble Field in 2007

SEC and Super Regional weekend games typically draw the largest crowds, giving rise to huge weekend gatherings. Mississippi State currently holds the NCAA record for the largest single game on-campus baseball attendance at 16,423 in a game against SEC rival Ole Miss. In 2021 versus Notre Dame, MSU had the NCAA's top all-time highest attended Super Regional game with 14,385 fans. This 2021 Super Regional also had attendance of 13,971 and 11,754 in the other two games for an NCAA record attendance for a super regional series of 40,140. On April 14–16, 2023, Mississippi State fans set the on-campus record for most-attended 3-game series by packing 43,986 fans into the Dude over the course of three games against arch rival Ole Miss, a series they won 2-1.

Mississippi State has all 25 of the top 25 on-campus crowds in the history of college baseball. Overall, DNF-PDS has held 22 crowds over 12,000 and 58 crowds over 10,000.

In 2012, college baseball writer Eric Sorenson ranked the stadium as the best big game atmosphere in Division I baseball.

=== Top baseball crowds at DNF-PDS ===
Rank	Attendance	Opponent	Date	Record broken
1	16,423	Ole Miss	April 15, 2023	NCAA on-campus record
2	15,586	Ole Miss	April 12, 2014	#2 NCAA on-campus record
3	15,078	Texas A&M	April 16, 2016	#3 NCAA on-campus record
4	14,991	Florida	April 22, 1989	#4 NCAA on-campus record
5	14,739	Ole Miss	April 14, 2023	#5 NCAA on-campus record
6	14,562	Auburn	April 20, 2013	#6 NCAA on-campus record
7	14,468	Ole Miss	May 9, 2025	#7 NCAA on-campus record
8	14,385	Notre Dame	June 12, 2021	#7 NCAA on-campus record NCAA Super Regional single-game record
9	14,378	LSU	April 16, 1988	#9 NCAA on-campus record
10	14,320	Arizona State	February 25, 2023	#10 NCAA on-campus record
11	14,273	Alabama	May 4, 2024	#11 NCAA on-campus record
12	14,077	Alabama	March 26, 2022	#12 NCAA on-campus record
13	13,974	LSU	March 16, 2024	#13 NCAA on-campus record
14	13,971	Notre Dame	June 13, 2021	#14 on-campus record #2 NCAA Super Regional single-game record
15	13,970	Kentucky	May 3, 2025	#15 NCAA on-campus record
16	13,761	Arkansas	April 25, 1992	#16 NCAA on-campus record
17	13,715	Clemson	June 9, 2007	#17 NCAA on-campus record #3 NCAA Super Regional single-game record
18	13,691	Kentucky	April 8, 2017	#18 NCAA on-campus record
19	13,617	Georgia	April 8, 2006	#19 NCAA on-campus record
20	13,477	Georgia	April 6, 2024	#20 NCAA on-campus record
21	13,452	Arizona	June 11, 2016	#21 NCAA on-campus record #4 NCAA Super Regional single-game record
22	13,351	Long Beach State	February 19, 2022	#22 NCAA on-campus record
23	13,338	Ole Miss	April 17, 2021	#22 NCAA on-campus record First home series after lifting of COVID-19 restrictions
24	13,224	Ole Miss	April 11, 2014	#23 NCAA on-campus record
25	13,132	Stanford	June 8, 2019	#24 NCAA on-campus record #5 NCAA Super Regional single-game record
26	13,123	Ole Miss	April 15, 2000	#25 NCAA on-campus record
27	13,004	Florida	April 18, 2005	#27 NCAA on-campus record
29	12,913	Arizona	June 10, 2016	#28 NCAA on-campus record #6 NCAA Super Regional single-game record
30	12,708	Auburn	April 24, 1993	#29 NCAA on-campus record
31	12,620	Clemson	June 8, 2007	#30 NCAA on-campus record #7 NCAA Super Regional single-game record

== See also ==
- List of NCAA Division I baseball venues
