= Kevin Chapman (baseball) =

American baseball player (born 1988)

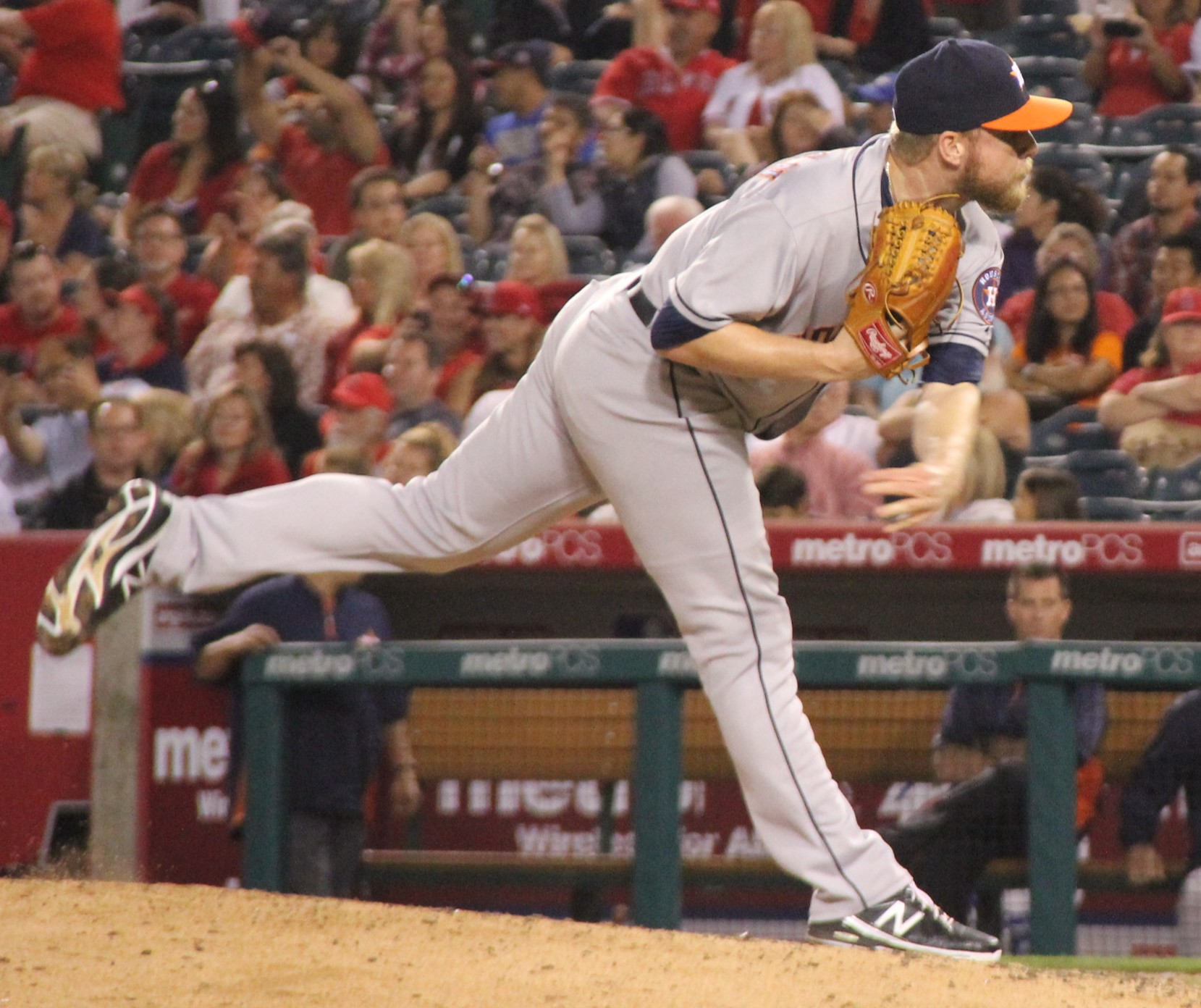
- Chapman with the Houston Astros in 2013
- Pitcher
- Born: February 19, 1988 (age 38); Coral Springs, Florida, U.S.
- Batted: Left Threw: Left

MLB debut
- August 9, 2013, for the Houston Astros

Last MLB appearance
- October 2, 2016, for the Houston Astros

MLB statistics
- Win–loss record: 3–1
- Earned run average: 4.09
- Strikeouts: 48
- Stats at Baseball Reference

Teams
- Houston Astros (2013–2016)

Kevin Allen Chapman (born February 19, 1988) is an American former professional baseball pitcher. He played in Major League Baseball (MLB) for the Houston Astros from 2013 to 2016.

== Career ==
Chapman was drafted by the Detroit Tigers in the 42nd round of the 2006 MLB draft out of Westminster Academy in Fort Lauderdale, Florida, but did not sign and attended the University of Florida. He was then drafted by the Chicago White Sox in the 50th round of the 2009 Major League Baseball draft, but again chose not to sign and returned to Florida.

=== Kansas City Royals ===
The Kansas City Royals drafted Chapman in the fourth round, with the 119th overall selection of the 2010 Major League Baseball draft and he signed. He made his professional debut with the High–A Wilmington Blue Rocks, accumulating a 5.50 ERA with 20 strikeouts across 18 innings of work.

Chapman split the 2011 campaign between Wilmington and the Double–A Northwest Arkansas Naturals, compiling a 4.94 ERA with 90 strikeouts and 10 saves across 40 relief appearances.

=== Houston Astros ===
On March 20, 2012, Chapman and a player to be named later were traded to the Houston Astros in exchange for Humberto Quintero and Jason Bourgeois.

Chapman was invited to spring training in 2013 and received his first callup to MLB later that season on August 8. He was optioned to the Oklahoma City RedHawks on April 17, 2014, and recalled on July 1. He was optioned the next day, and recalled for the second time that season on August 15. Chapman started the 2015 season with the Fresno Grizzlies, after spending spring training at the major league level. He was recalled in May, and returned to the minor leagues later that month. Chapman began the 2016 season in the minor leagues. He was called up to the major leagues on August 11 to fill out the roster for a doubleheader. At the end of the minor league season in September, Chapman was promoted to the major league level.

Chapman was eligible to represent Canada at the 2017 World Baseball Classic because his father was born in Ontario.

=== Atlanta Braves ===
Chapman was claimed off of waivers by the Atlanta Braves on March 13, 2017. He was assigned to the Triple-A Gwinnett Braves on March 31.

=== Minnesota Twins ===
On May 8, 2017, Chapman was traded to the Minnesota Twins in exchange for Danny Santana. He was released on June 13, 2017.

=== New Britain Bees ===
On April 3, 2018, Chapman signed with the New Britain Bees of the independent Atlantic League of Professional Baseball.

=== Detroit Tigers ===
On May 20, 2018, Chapman's contract was purchased by the Detroit Tigers. In 14 games for the Triple–A Toledo Mud Hens, he recorded a 3.45 ERA with 13 strikeouts and two saves across 15 2/3 innings pitched. Chapman elected free agency following the season on November 2.

== Personal ==
Chapman's cousin Matt den Dekker is a former professional baseball player.
