= COVID-19 pandemic in Mississippi =

- Disease: COVID-19
- Pathogen: SARS-CoV-2
- Location: Mississippi, U.S
- First outbreak: Wuhan, Hubei, China
- Index case: Forrest County
- Arrival date: March 12, 2020
- Confirmed cases: 806,838
- Active cases: 9,149
- Hospitalized cases: 531 (current); 5,975 (cumulative)
- Critical cases: 131 (current)
- Ventilator cases: 68 (current)
- Recovered: 89,737
- Deaths: 12,466

Government website
- Mississippi State Department of Health

The COVID-19 pandemic reached the U.S. state of Mississippi in March 2020.

== Timeline ==
The Mississippi State Department of Health (MSDH) confirmed their first case in the state on March 12, 2020, in an individual from Forrest County who had recently traveled to Florida. Three days later, on March 15, the state had a spike in cases (4) in the state bringing the total to 10. On March 16, two new cases in the state, one in Pearl River County and another Monroe County. On March 17, cases in the state jumped from 12 to 21, with 4 in Hinds County, 3 in Leflore County, one in Jackson County, and one in Harrison County. The next day, on March 18, cases spiked up to 34, with DeSoto County seeing their first case, along with Madison County and Perry County. Bolivar County saw their first 2 cases. The following day, on March 19, the state saw 16 cases and its first death. Harris and Pearl River counties saw 3 new cases each, while the counties of DeSoto, Forrest, and Jackson counties saw one additional case, while at least one new case were reported in the counties of Holmes, Jones, Smith, Walthall, Wilkinson, Winston, and Yazoo. On March 20, the state saw 30 new cases, bringing the total up to 80. New cases were reported in Adams, Franklin, Humphreys, Lawrence, Lee, Marshall, Monroe, Pike, Rankin, Tippah, and Webster counties, while additional cases were reported in Coahoma, DeSoto, Hancock, Harrison, Hinds, Holmes, Jackson, and Madison counties. On March 21, the state reported 60 new cases, jumping the total to 140. March 22 saw 67 new cases in the state, with most counties in the state ending up with a new case.

On July 9, the Mississippi statehouse was closed due to an outbreak in the legislature, as 26 lawmakers and 10 Capitol employees tested positive for COVID-19. Lt. Governor Delbert Hosemann and Speaker of the House Philip Gunn were infected. A total of 49 infections were linked to the outbreak. All legislators survived, but there was one death linked to an infection spread by a legislator. The outbreak led to delays in the legislators meeting to discuss important budget issues.

On July 21, 1,635 new cases and 31 new deaths were reported in the state.

By July 31, the state was at 83% ICU capacity, with some hospitals completely full and transferring patients out of state.

In June 2021, as Mississippi was one of five U.S. states with less than 35% of its population vaccinated, Dr. Scott Gottlieb, former commissioner of the U.S. Food and Drug Administration, predicted the state was at risk for outbreaks of the Delta variant.

== Government responses ==
On March 14, two days after the first case was announced in the state, Governor Tate Reeves declared a state of emergency, due to the impact of the coronavirus on the neighboring state of Louisiana. Louisiana at the time was the most infected state per capita. Reeves recently came back from a trip from Spain (a country hit hard by the virus) and stated that he will voluntarily work from home for precautionary purposes.

On March 15, Jackson's city mayor Chokwe Antar Lumumba declared a civil emergency for the city.

On March 21, the mayor of Tupelo, Jason Shelton, imposed a stay-at-home order that went into effect early on March 22. The same day, Columbus put in a curfew from 10 pm to 6 am until further notice.

On March 24, Governor Reeves issued an executive order deeming most businesses as "essential" including restaurants, bars and other establishments, and limiting dine-in services to 10 persons. The order also banned local governments from imposing stricter orders. However, the wording of the executive order lead to some confusion among local governments on the authority of the state overriding that of restrictions put into place by municipalities and counties. In response to criticism and confusion expressed by the public and local officials, Governor Reeves issued a supplemental order on March 26 that clarified that stricter restrictions put into place by local governing bodies were allowed.

On April 1, a state-wide stay-at-home order was issued, requiring all non-essential businesses to close. This overrode previous allowances for dine-in services in restaurants made in the March 24 executive order. State health officer Dr. Thomas Dobbs confirmed that MSDH is tracking the number of available ventilators and the number of healthcare workers infected with COVID-19, but will not release the numbers publicly. Dr. Dobbs cited the potential for fear and confusion from the numbers, despite other states like Louisiana providing them. The April 1 order also included a provision to cease enforcement of eviction orders; however, on May 14, the governor ceased the suspension of evictions as of June 1.

On April 17, Reeves extended the stay-at-home order through April 27, 2020, while allowing Coast beaches and state lakes to reopen for recreation, and businesses to perform curbside pickup and delivery.

On April 27, the Governor reopened retail businesses, and elective dental and medical procedures resumed. However, on May 2, the governor postponed plans to reopen the economy after 397 new cases were confirmed, the largest increase Mississippi had experienced.

Beginning May 12, the wearing of face masks would be required in public when social distancing is not possible, and inside businesses, within seven counties identified as having a high rate of new cases. This included Attala, Leake, Scott, Jasper, Neshoba, Newton and Lauderdale counties. On May 28, the order was extended through June 8 and to Wayne County, while Attala, Leake, Scott and Newton were removed from the order due to a reduced number of cases.

As of June 8, 2020, Mississippi is using a 'presumed recovered' number of cases. The number is estimated based on it being 14 days or more since the case was tested positive, and they were not hospitalized, or 21 days since they tested positive, and they were hospitalized, or it is unknown if they were hospitalized.

On July 11, Reeves announced a new mask order covering Claiborne, De Soto, Grenada, Harrison, Hinds, Jackson, Jefferson, Madison, Quitman, Rankin, Sunflower, Washington, and Wayne counties, which took effect on July 13.

Cases dropped by 54% after a statewide mask mandate was put in place on August 4, but began to rise again after that mandate was lifted on September 30. The statewide mandate was put in place as the county-by-county approach Reeves implemented over the summer failed to prevent a rising tide of new cases that threatened to overwhelm the state's hospitals. Despite calls from state health officials to reinstate the statewide mandate, the county by county approach remained in place as of November 14.

On March 2, 2021, Governor Reeves scaled back on his COVID-19 restriction executive orders. However, local governments were not restricted from issuing their own measures. The orders were replaced with recommendations. Tate claimed that the time for government intervention was over, citing the massive drop in hospitalization cases.

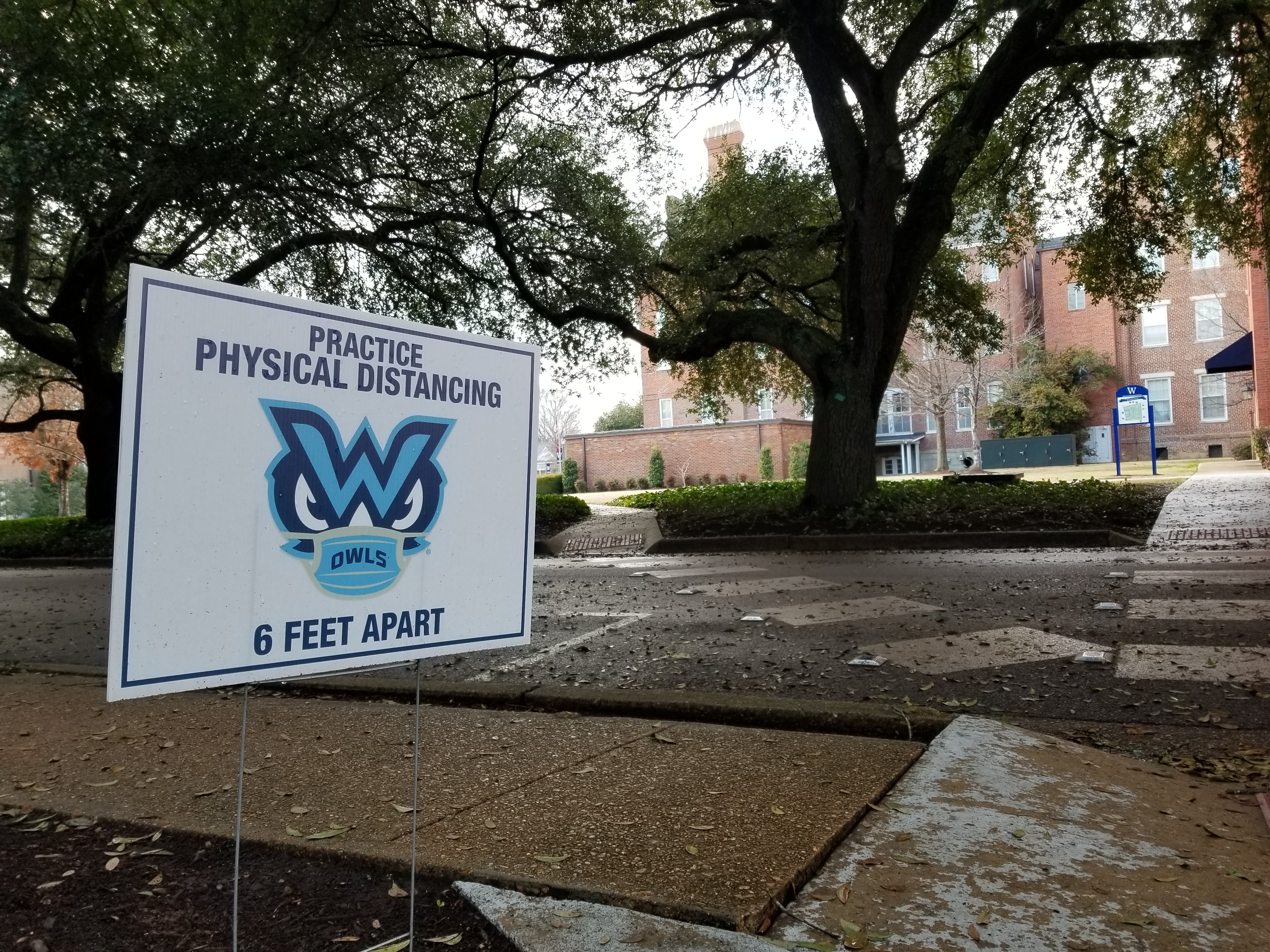
A sign promoting distancing and mask use at the Mississippi University for Women

== Impact on sports ==
On March 12, the National Collegiate Athletic Association cancelled all winter and spring tournaments, most notably the Division I men's and women's basketball tournaments, affecting colleges and universities statewide. On March 16, the National Junior College Athletic Association also canceled the remainder of the winter seasons as well as the spring seasons.

== See also ==
- Timeline of the COVID-19 pandemic in the United States
- COVID-19 pandemic in the United States – for impact on the country
- COVID-19 pandemic – for impact on other countries
