= Coral Springs Christian Academy =

Location
- 2251 Riverside Dr, Coral Springs, FL 33065; Coral Springs, Florida; United States; 26.258137°N 80.236042°W

Information
- School type: Private
- Established: 1971
- Status: Closed
- Grades: K–12
- Enrollment: >500
- Colors: Red, navy blue, and white
- Mascot: Crusaders
- Website: coralspringschristianacademy.com

Coral Springs Christian Academy (CSCA) was a private Christian school in Coral Springs, Florida, serving students in pre-school through 12th grade.

The school was a ministry of First Presbyterian Church of Coral Springs, until the school was sold because of damages caused by Hurricane Irma. Also known as CSCA, the school opened in 1971 as an elementary and middle school called "Coral Springs Christian School."

CSCA was accredited by the Southern Association of Colleges and Schools (SACS), Association of Christian Schools International (ACSI), and the Florida Council of Independent Schools (FCIS).
