= Hula Bowl =

Annual college football all-star game

- Altrua HealthShare Hula Bowl
- Stadium: Spec Martin Stadium (2026)
- Location: DeLand, Florida (2026)
- Previous stadiums: Honolulu Stadium (1960–1975); War Memorial Stadium (1998–2005); Aloha Stadium (1976–1997, 2006–2008, 2020–2021); Acrisure Bounce House (2022–2025)
- Previous locations: Honolulu, Hawaii (1960–1975); Wailuku, Hawaii (1998–2005); Halawa, Hawaii (1976–1997, 2006–2008, 2020–2021); Orlando, Florida (2022–2025)
- Operated: 1946–2008, 2020–present
- Website: hulabowl.com

Sponsors
- Kodak (1989–1994); Hooters (1995–1999); Rivals.com (2000–2002); Credit Union National Association (2005); Cornerstone Bancard (2006–2008); Newsweek (2020); Tunnel to Towers Foundation (2023); Caribe Royale Orlando Resort (2024–2025); Altrua HealthShare (2026)

2026 matchup
- Aina vs. Kai (Kai 38–21)

2027 matchup
- January 9, 2027

The Hula Bowl is a post-season college football all-star game held annually, usually in January. From inception through the 2021 playing, it was held in Hawaii; since the 2022 edition, it has been played in two Florida locations near Orlando.

The game was first staged in 1947, between mainland collegiate players and local Hawaiian players; it has been played exclusively with collegiate players since 1960. The bowl was paused following its 2008 edition, then was revived in January 2020.

The game was originally held at Honolulu Stadium in Honolulu, then moved to Aloha Stadium in Halawa starting with the January 1976 edition. The game remained at Aloha Stadium through the 2021 edition, except for eight editions played at War Memorial Stadium on the island of Maui. The University of Central Florida (UCF) agreed to host the January 2022 playing of the game, due to Aloha Stadium being closed for repairs and upgrades.

== History ==
UCLA quarterback Ernie Case played in the inaugural 1947 game.

In late 1946, the first Hula Bowl was organized by Paul Stupin and Mackay Yanagisawa. When the inaugural game was played on January 5, 1947, the teams were composed of mainland college players (the "Southern California Rose Bowl Stars", led by UCLA quarterback Ernie Case) pitted against a local team of graduates of Leilehua (the "Leialums"), a local high school in Wahiawa, Hawaii—the mainland team won, 34–7. The teams played a two-game series every January until 1951, when the format was changed to allow National Football League (NFL) players to join the Hawaiian all-stars, in an effort to create a more competitive environment. From 1960 onward, the game featured only collegiate players, and game results are listed in NCAA records. Players were historically rostered by college location; North vs. South or East vs. West. Since 2000, team names of Aina and Kai, the Hawaiian words for land and ocean, have been used multiple times.

The game was originally played in Honolulu Stadium in Honolulu through the January 1975 playing, then moved to Aloha Stadium in neighboring Halawa. In 1997, the then-mayor of Maui County, Linda Lingle, obtained authorization to spend $1.2 million to improve War Memorial Stadium in the town of Kahului on the island of Maui, which then hosted the game for the 1998 through 2005 playings. However, due to poor attendance and reduced revenue, the Hula Bowl returned to Oahu for its 2006 game and stayed at Aloha Stadium through the 2008 playing.

The game has predominantly been played in January as one of the final games of the college football postseason, allowing players who competed in bowl games with their collegiate teams to participate. The game has been held in early February twice, in 2002 and 2003.

For many years, the Hula Bowl was distinguished from a similar event, the Senior Bowl, by playing by collegiate rules rather than professional rules, and by remaining amateur (the Senior Bowl paid players through its 1988 edition). This was important for those wishing to remain eligible to compete in other collegiate sports (such as college baseball) or otherwise retain amateur status.

=== Changing direction ===
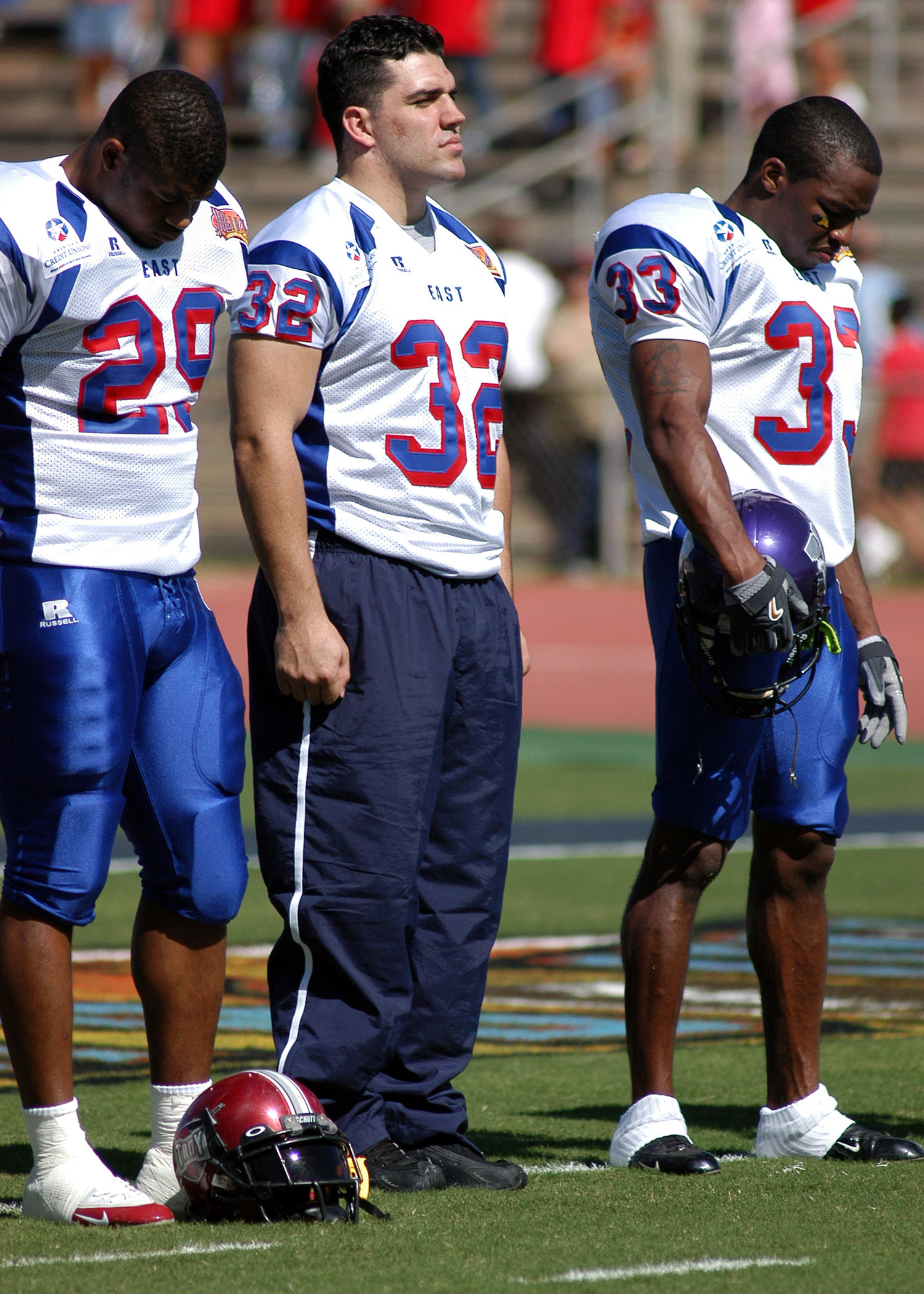
Kyle Eckel of Navy at the 2005 game

On July 1, 2006, it was announced that the American Football Coaches Association (AFCA) would end its ten-year relationship with the Hula Bowl due to "philosophical differences" over the future plans for the game, including proposed changes for the 2007 game — such as reintroducing the "Hawaiian Islands versus Mainland" matchup used from 1947 to 1959. University of Hawaii and former NFL head coach June Jones expressed a willingness to coach a potential Hawaiian Islands team, which would have a mix of Hawaiian and Polynesian players and, bowl organizers hoped, would draw more fans to the game. The Hula Bowl had also discussed the idea of allowing junior status players to participate in the game and bringing over college football players from Japan, something the game had done in the recent past. Game officials also discussed awarding a national "Hula Bowl Player of the Week" to college players during the regular season; the winning players would have been invited to play in the Hula Bowl and been able to direct a $1,000 donation to a charity in their state.

=== Dormancy ===
After the January 2008 playing, the bowl remained dormant. Organizers searched "for opportunities to reintroduce and reimagine the historic bowl game", and in November 2016, announced their intent to restart the game in North Carolina in January 2018. However, in March 2017, additional news reports indicated that a revival of the game was unlikely, as a key supporter of the proposal, North Carolina governor Pat McCrory, left office at the start of that year.

=== Revival ===
On October 29, 2019, it was announced that the Hula Bowl would be revived; the 2020 edition was played at Aloha Stadium on January 26, 2020. It featured "NCAA college football players from all divisions, along with international players". Aloha Stadium also hosted the 2021 edition, played on January 31, 2021, held without spectators after the facility was "deemed unsafe to hold crowds" in December 2020. In August 2021, with Aloha Stadium closed for repairs and upgrades, the University of Central Florida (UCF) agreed to host the 2022 playing—scheduled for January 15—at its home stadium, then known as FBC Mortgage Stadium and now as Acrisure Bounce House, near Orlando, Florida.

== Game results ==
Key
East win	West win
North win	South win
Aina win	Kai win
Tie

The Hula Bowl has used four different pairs of team designations. Before 2000, teams were rostered as either North vs. South or East vs. West, with the exception of the 1994 game, which was College Stars vs. Hawaii Ponoʻi ("Hawaii's own"). Since 2000, the matchup has been Aina vs. Kai, except for 2005 and 2006, which reverted to East vs. West. Past NCAA records have substituted North or West in place of Kai ("ocean"), and South or East in place of Aina ("land").

Date	Winner		Loser		Attendance
January 10, 1960	East	34	West	8	23,000
January 8, 1961	East	14	West	7	17,017
January 7, 1962	East 7, West 7				20,598
January 6, 1963	North	20	South	13	20,000
January 4, 1964	North	20	South	13	18,177
January 9, 1965	South	16	North	14	22,100
January 8, 1966	North	27	South	26	25,000
January 7, 1967	North	28	South	27	23,500
January 6, 1968	North	50	South	6	21,000
January 4, 1969	North	13	South	7	23,000
January 10, 1970	South	35	North	13	25,000
January 9, 1971	North	42	South	32	23,500
January 8, 1972	North	24	South	7	23,000
January 6, 1973	South	17	North	3	23,000
January 5, 1974	East	24	West	14	23,000
January 4, 1975	East	34	West	25	22,000
January 10, 1976	East	16	West	0	45,458
January 8, 1977	West	20	East	17	45,579
January 7, 1978	West	42	East	22	48,197
January 6, 1979	East	29	West	24	49,132
January 5, 1980	East	17	West	10	47,096
January 10, 1981	West	24	East	17	39,010
January 9, 1982	West	26	East	23	43,002
January 15, 1983	East	30	West	14	39,456
January 7, 1984	West	21	East	16	34,216
January 5, 1985	East	34	West	14	30,767
January 11, 1986	West	23	East	10	29,564
January 10, 1987	West	16	East	14	17,775

Venues
Honolulu Stadium (1960–1975)
Aloha Stadium (1976–1997, 2006–2008, 2020–2021)
War Memorial Stadium (Maui; 1998–2005)
FBC Mortgage Stadium (Orlando; 2022–2025)
Spec Martin Stadium (DeLand, Florida; 2026)

Date	Winner		Loser		Attendance	Ref.
January 16, 1988	West	20	East	18	26,737	
January 7, 1989	East	21	West	10	25,000	
January 13, 1990	West	21	East	13	28,742	
January 19, 1991	East	23	West	10	21,926	
January 11, 1992	West	27	East	20	23,112	
January 16, 1993	West	13	East	10	25,479	
January 22, 1994	College Stars	28	Hawaii Ponoʻi	15	33,947	
January 22, 1995	East	20	West	9	19,074	
January 21, 1996	East	17	West	10	25,112	
January 19, 1997	South	26	North	13	24,725	
January 18, 1998	South	20	North	19	20,079	
January 24, 1999	South	34	North	14	23,719	
January 22, 2000	Aina 28, Kai 28				23,719	
January 20, 2001	Kai	31	Aina	23	23,719	
February 2, 2002	Aina	45	Kai	28	24,000	
February 1, 2003	Aina	27	Kai	24		
January 17, 2004	Aina	26	Kai	7		
January 22, 2005	East	20	West	13		
January 21, 2006	East	10	West	7		
January 14, 2007	Aina	18	Kai	10	8,000	
January 12, 2008	Aina	38	Kai	7		
January 26, 2020	Kai	23	Aina	7	5,500	
January 31, 2021	Kai	15	Aina	13	0	
January 15, 2022	Kai	21	Aina	20		
January 14, 2023	Kai	16	Aina	13	8,314	
January 13, 2024	Kai	24	Aina	17		
January 11, 2025	Aina	10	Kai	3		
January 10, 2026	Kai	38	Aina	21		

All-time series (updated through January 2026 game)
East leads West, 15–11–1
North leads South, 8–6
Kai leads Aina 7–6–1
College Stars lead Hawaii Ponoʻi, 1–0

== MVPs ==
=== 1947–2008 ===
Table

Year	Name	College
1947	John Johnson	UCLA
1948	Dick Hagen	Washington
1949	Jerry Williams	Washington State
1950	Dick Kempthorn	Michigan
1951	Sonny Grandelius	Michigan State
1952	Vic Janowicz; Don Coleman	Ohio State; Michigan State
1953	Tom Stolhandske	Texas
1954	Bobby Garrett	Stanford
1955	Carroll Hardy	Colorado
1956	Bob Davenport	UCLA
1957	Paul Hornung	Notre Dame
1958	John David Crow; Lou Michaels	Texas A&M; Kentucky
1959	Bob Ptacek; Sam Williams	Michigan; Michigan State
1960	Richie Lucas; Larry Grantham	Penn State; Ole Miss
1961	Fran Tarkenton; Mike Ditka	Georgia; Pittsburgh
1962	Lance Alworth; Merlin Olsen	Arkansas; Utah State
1963	Kermit Alexander; Dave Watson	UCLA; Georgia Tech
1964	Peter Liske; Dave Wilcox	Penn State; Oregon
1965	Larry Elkins; Jeff Jordan	Baylor; Tulsa
1966	Steve Juday; Carl McAdams	Michigan State; Oklahoma
1967	Charlie Brown; Dave Williams	Missouri; Washington
1968	Larry Csonka; Harry Gunner	Syracuse; Oregon State
1969	Bill Enyart; Tim Buchanan	Oregon State; Hawaii
1970	Bobby Anderson; Floyd Reese	Colorado; UCLA
1971	Jim Plunkett; Jack Ham	Stanford; Penn State
1972	Jerry Tagge; Walt Patulski	Nebraska; Notre Dame
1973	Greg Pruitt; Jim Merlo	Oklahoma; Stanford
1974	Norris Weese; Lucious Selmon	Ole Miss; Oklahoma
1975	Condredge Holloway; Rubin Carter	Tennessee; Miami (FL)
1976	Cornelius Greene; Lee Roy Selmon	Ohio State; Oklahoma
1977	Tony Dorsett; Ron Crosby	Pittsburgh; Penn State
1978	Dave Turner; Ricky Odom	San Diego State; USC
1979	Rick Leach; Ted Brown	Michigan; NC State
1980	Billy Sims; Steve McMichael	Oklahoma; Texas

Year	Name	College
1981	Samoa Samoa; Kenny Easley; Blane Gaison	Washington State; UCLA; Hawaii
1982	Walter Abercrombie; Leo Wisniewski	Baylor; Penn State
1983	Dan Marino; Paul Soares	Pittsburgh; Navy
1984	Jim Sandusky; Freddie Gilbert	San Diego State; Georgia
1985	Al Toon; Freddie Joe Nunn	Wisconsin; Ole Miss
1986	Doug Gaynor; Rogers Alexander	Long Beach State; Penn State
1987	Chris Miller; Louis Brock	Oregon; USC
1988	Aaron Cox; Dennis Price	Arizona State; UCLA
1989	Anthony Dilweg; Deion Sanders	Duke; Florida State
1990	Cary Conklin; James Francis	Washington; Baylor
1991	John Langeloh; Derrick Brownlow	Michigan State; Illinois
1992	Derrick Moore; Steve Israel	Northeastern State; Pittsburgh
1993	Lamar Thomas; Ron Carpenter	Miami (FL); Miami (OH)
1994	Andre Coleman; Chris Maumalanga	Kansas State; Kansas
1995	Kordell Stewart; Robert Baldwin	Colorado; Duke
1996	Winslow Oliver; Regan Upshaw	New Mexico; California
1997	Archie Amerson; Andy Russ	Northern Arizona; Mississippi State
1998	Chris Howard; Eric Ogbogu	Michigan; Maryland
1999	Kevin Daft; Ricky Williams; Brad Scioli	UC Davis; Texas; Penn State
2000	Bashir Yamini; Todd Husak; Brian Young	Iowa; Stanford; UTEP
2001	Jonathan Beasley; Reggie Germany	Kansas State; Ohio State
2002	Nick Rolovich; Chester Taylor	Hawaii; Toledo
2003	David Kircus; Kassim Osgood	Grand Valley State; San Diego State
2004	Wes Welker; Fred Russell; Colby Bockwoldt	Texas Tech; Iowa; Brigham Young
2005	Ronald Stanley; Derrick Wimbush	Michigan State; Fort Valley State
2006	Brent Hawkins; Brad Smith	Illinois State; Missouri
2007	Will Proctor; Chad Nkang	Clemson; Elon
2008	Bernard Morris; Angelo Craig	Marshall; Cincinnati

=== 2020–present ===
Year	Name	College	Ref.
2020	Reggie Walker; Niko Lalos	Kansas State; Dartmouth	
2021	Mekhi Sargent; Carlo Kemp; C.J. Marable; Nick McCloud	Iowa; Michigan; Coastal Carolina; Notre Dame	
2022	Bryant Koback; Tayler Hawkins; Travell Harris; Luke Masterson	Toledo; San Diego State; Washington State; Wake Forest	
2023	Holton Ahlers; Jordan Ferguson	East Carolina; Middle Tennessee	
2024	Blake Watson; Jason Johnson	Memphis; UCF	
2025	Mario Anderson; Major Williams	Memphis; Carson-Newman	
2026	Myles Montgomery; Jackson Kuwatch	UCF; Miami	

== Coaches ==
Coaches for the first Hula Bowl played exclusively with college players, in January 1960, were Bud Wilkinson of Oklahoma and Paul Dietzel of LSU. Dietzel's East squad defeated Wilkinson's West team, 34–8. Multiple inductees of the College Football Hall of Fame have coached in the Hula Bowl, including: Bobby Bowden, Terry Donahue, Johnny Majors, Ara Parseghian, Bo Schembechler, and Barry Switzer. Larry Price coached in eight Hula Bowls (1969–1976) while Dick Tomey coached in seven Hula Bowls (1978–1979, 1981, 1983, 1985–1986, 1991); both while they were coaching with Hawaii. For coaches from the mainland, Lou Holtz has the most appearances, with five (1979, 1989–1990, 1993, 1997). These totals include both head coach and assistant coaching appearances.

== Hall of fame ==
In 2019, the Hula Bowl announced the creation of a hall of fame. The hall's inductees are:

Hula Bowl Hall of Fame
Year	Name	Role	College	Career highlights
2020	Junior Ah You	Player	Arizona State	CFL (1972–1981), Canadian Football Hall of Fame
2020	Eric Dickerson	Player	SMU	NFL (1983–1993), 6× Pro Bowl, Pro Football Hall of Fame, College Football Hall of Fame
2020	Anthony Miller	Player	Tennessee	NFL (1988–1997), 5× Pro Bowl
2020	Mike White	Coach	Cal (1977); Illinois (1988)	as player: Cal (1955–1957) as head coach: Cal (1972–1977), Illinois (1980–1987), Oakland Raiders (1995–1996)
2020	Rich Miano	Contributor	Hawaii	Hula Bowl executive director; NFL (1985–1989; 1991–1995)
2021	Drew Brees	Player	Purdue	NFL (2001–2020), 13× Pro Bowl
2021	Tim Brown	Player	Notre Dame	NFL (1988–2004), 9× Pro Bowl, Pro Football Hall of Fame, 1987 Heisman Trophy, College Football Hall of Fame
2021	Jesse Sapolu	Player	Hawaii	NFL (1983–1997), 2× Pro Bowl
2021	Steve Spurrier	Coach	Florida (1992)	as player: Florida (1964–1966), 1966 Heisman Trophy, College Football Hall of Fame, NFL (1967–1976) as head coach: Duke (1987–1989), Florida (1990–2001), Washington Redskins (2002–2003), South Carolina (2005–2015)
2021	Pat O'Farrell	Contributor	West Point	Hula Bowl ambassador to the armed forces
2023	Steve Bartkowski	Player	Cal	NFL (1975–1986), 2× Pro Bowl, College Football Hall of Fame
2023	Brandon Marshall	Player	UCF	NFL (2006–2018), 6× Pro Bowl
2023	Willie Roaf	Player	Louisiana Tech	NFL (1993–2005), 11× Pro Bowl, Pro Football Hall of Fame, College Football Hall of Fame
2023	Ron Simmons	Player	Florida State	CFL (1981), USFL (1983–1983), College Football Hall of Fame
2023	Darryl Talley	Player	West Virginia	NFL (1993–1996), 2× Pro Bowl, College Football Hall of Fame
2023	Reggie White	Player	Tennessee	USFL (1984–1985), NFL (1985–1998; 2000), 13× Pro Bowl, Pro Football Hall of Fame, College Football Hall of Fame
2023	Bobby Bowden	Coach	Florida State (1987, 1991, 1997)	as player: Alabama (1948), Howard (1949–1952) as coach: Howard (1959–1962), West Virginia (1970–1975), Florida State (1976–2009)

Head coach appearances in the Hula Bowl are listed in parentheses in the College column.

== In popular culture ==
In 1997, a storyline in the comic strip Funky Winkerbean had Harry Dinkle and the Scapegoats marching band preparing to perform at the Hula Bowl.

== See also ==
- Poi Bowl (1936–1939)
- Pineapple Bowl (1940–1941, 1947–1952)
- Aloha Bowl (1982–2000)
- Oahu Bowl (1998–2000)
- Hawaii Bowl (2002–present)
- List of college bowl games
