= 2020 Hula Bowl =

2020 Newsweek Hula Bowl
- 74th Hula Bowl
Team Aina	Team Kai
7	23
Head coach: Mike Smith	Head coach: Rex Ryan
	1	2	3	4	Total
Team Aina	0	7	0	0	7
Team Kai	0	13	10	0	23
- Date: January 26, 2020
- Season: 2019
- Stadium: Aloha Stadium
- Location: Honolulu, Hawaii
- MVP: Team Kai: Reggie Walker (DE, Kansas State); Team Aina: Niko Lalos (DE, Dartmouth)
- National anthem: Sabrina McKenna
- Referee: Steve Strimling (Pac-12)
- Halftime show: Kamehameha Schools Warrior Marching Band & Color Guard
- Attendance: 5,500

United States TV coverage
- Network: CBS Sports Network
- Announcers: Kanoa Leahey (play-by-play), Jordan Helle (color), Kainoa Carlson (sideline), Ian Scheuring (sideline)

The 2020 Hula Bowl was a post-season college football all-star game played on January 26, 2020, at 5:30 p.m. HST (10:30 p.m. EST), at Aloha Stadium in Honolulu, Hawaii. The game featured "NCAA college football players from all divisions, along with international players". The game was the last of the 2019–20 bowl games and, while not restricted to FBS players, it was the final game of the 2019 FBS football season.

This was the first playing of the Hula Bowl since January 12, 2008. Head coaches were Rex Ryan and Mike Smith, who both previously coached at the college and professional levels. Scouts from the CFL, NFL, and XFL were expected to attend. Television coverage was provided by the CBS Sports Network. With news magazine Newsweek as the title sponsor, the game was officially the Newsweek Hula Bowl.

== Players ==
The game's official website had a page for team rosters, with notable and selected players listed below. The total number of players in the Hula Bowl was capped at 100. There were over two dozen players in the game from Football Championship Subdivision (FCS) programs.

Player	Position	College	Aina / Kai	Ref.
Tsubasa Brennan	WR	Waseda University (Japan)	Aina	
Michael Dean	WR	Idaho State (FCS)	Aina	
Deondre Francois	QB	Hampton (FCS)	Kai	
Bailey Hale	K	Louisiana Tech (FBS)	Kai	
Jaylon Hibbs	WR	UNSW (Australia)	Kai	
Rysen John	WR	Simon Fraser (D-II, Canada)	Kai	
Austin Kafentzis	S	BYU (FBS)	Aina	
Kaito Kawashima	CB	Chuo University (Japan)	Kai	
Niko Lalos	DE	Dartmouth (FCS)	Aina	
Cameron Mayberry	RB	Colorado Mines (D-II)	Kai	
Go Ogura	WR	Nihon University (Japan)	Aina	
Broc Rutter	QB	North Central College (D-III)	Aina	
Gabriel Sewell	LB	Nevada (FBS)	Kai	
Nick Vogel	K	UAB (FBS)	Aina	
Reggie Walker	DE	Kansas State (FBS)	Kai	

== Game summary ==
The game utilized NFL rules, with some modifications, including: all kickoffs and punts fielded by fair catch, and no blitzing allowed. Team Aina wore red uniforms, while Team Kai wore blue uniforms.

2020 Newsweek Hula Bowl

Quarter	1	2	3	4	Total
Aina	0	7	0	0	7
Kai	0	13	10	0	23

at Aloha Stadium • Honolulu, Hawaii

- Date: Sunday, January 26, 2020
- Game time: 10:30 p.m. EST (5:30 p.m. HST)
- Game attendance: 5,500
- TV: CBS Sports Network

Game information

First Quarter

- No scoring

Second Quarter

- (14:45) KAI – Bailey Hale 51-yard field goal (KAI, 3–0)
- (3:31) KAI – Cameron Mayberry 2-yard run, Bailey Hale kick (KAI, 10–0)
- (2:19) KAI – Bailey Hale 39-yard field goal (KAI, 13–0)
- (0:37) AINA – Michael Dean 28-yard reception from Broc Rutter, Nick Vogel kick (KAI, 13–7)

Third Quarter

- (4:56) KAI – Bailey Hale 25-yard field goal (KAI, 16–7)
- (3:34) KAI – Gabriel Sewell 35-yard fumble return, Bailey Hale kick (KAI, 23–7)

Fourth Quarter

- No scoring

== See also ==
- 2020 NFL draft
