= Springfield High School (Holland, Ohio) =

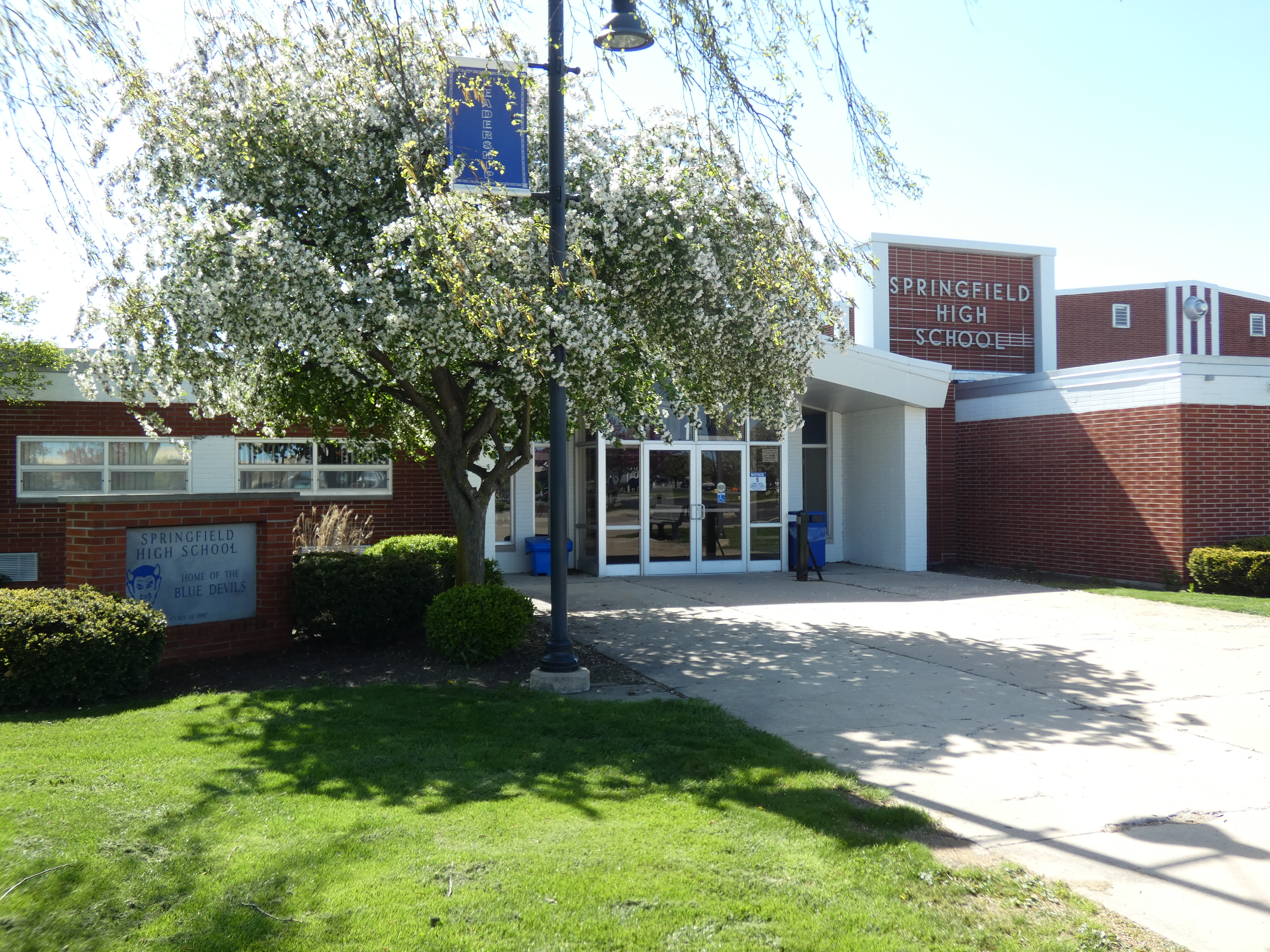

Location
- 1470 South McCord Road; Holland, Ohio 43528; United States; 41°36′59″N 83°42′17″W

Information
- Type: Public, coeducational
- Established: 1898
- School district: Springfield Local School District
- Principal: Robb Brown
- Teaching staff: 58.00 (FTE)
- Grades: 9-12
- Student to teacher ratio: 15.34
- Colors: Blue and White
- Fight song: Stand Up and Cheer
- Athletics conference: Northern Lakes League
- Team name: Blue Devils
- Yearbook: The Trident
- Website: School website

Springfield High School is a public high school located in Holland, Ohio, United States. It has an enrollment of approximately 1200 students in grades 9-12. The students it serves come from Holland, Sylvania Township, Maumee, Spencer Township, Toledo, and most of Springfield Township.

== Early history ==
The first school house in Springfield Township was a log cabin on the south side of Angola Road between McCord and Clark Street. Land for more schools was deeded to the township. The Eight Square School on Garden Road in 1846; the Red School on Holloway Road in 1847; the Green School on Holland-Sylvania in 1847; Starr School at Crissey in 1848 and Clark Street School in 1847. In 1893 a new three winged school house for grades 1-12 was completed. It was located where our current Holland Elementary now stands on Kittle Road and Madison Street. Leo Jacobs was the first principal.

By 1921 Holland had a centralized school system with nine teachers and 300 students. The library consisted of 261 volumes and a school bus fleet of two and the school budget for 1921 was $15000.

In 1925 a grassroots effort took place to fund a gymnasium. With the help of the Manual Training Boys and several generous citizens, the gymnasium was built for entertainment and sport events. Then, seating capacity was 1,350. It was the largest auditorium in Lucas County. It housed the music department in the 1950s-1970s. From the 1970s through 1980 this building housed the district's Administration offices.

On January 21, 1938, the community held a dedication ceremony for the most modern high school in Lucas County. The estimated cost of the project was $150,000. Touted as "the most modern building in Lucas County", the high school was complete with clocks in all classrooms, the latest in visual education and sound equipment, a cafeteria and cafeteria kitchen, a modern stage, the latest improved typewriters, the most modern and up-to-date heating and ventilating system, a separate library room, individual steel lockers, a girls' rest room, and chair storage. The graduating class for that year numbered 26. This remained the high school until 1968. Since 1968 this building has housed Springfield Middle School. Many additions have also been made to this building, which is now connected to the renovated Holland Elementary School.

=== Springfield High School ===
In 1960 Holland Schools became Springfield Schools and changed its high school mascot from the Holland Blue Zippers to the Springfield Blue Devils. When offered the opportunity to select their new mascot, Springfield High School students conducted research, learned of the honor associated with the Chasseurs Alpins regiment from France during World War I (known as "les diables bleus" or "blue devils"), and the Blue Devils from Duke University, and recommended in the early 1950s that the mascot be changed from the Blue Zippers to the Blue Devils. That was also the year that the school colors changed from blue and gold to blue and white. In 1960, students Judy and Mary Frumpkin, along with Connie Sherman, wrote the lyrics to the song "Stand Up And Cheer" song that is still played by the band and sung today. Students started attending the "new" high school in 1968. This building still houses the current high school, but has also enjoyed many renovations and additions since 1968. Springfield High School now has a field house, gymnasium, the Tombaugh Auditorium/theater that seats 800, a media center that holds 13,000 volumes, 68 classrooms and two computer labs.

Voter approval of a "no new tax" bond levy in November 2007 also allowed the district to add classrooms and updated fitness facilities to Springfield High School, an off-street loop for bus transportation at the high school and middle school, and additional parking for Springfield Middle School and Holland Elementary School guests.

== Current building ==
In 1967, SHS moved again to its current location at 1470 S. McCord in Holland. This location sits behind the old building. When the new building first opened it housed only grades 10-12.

In 1974, the building was expanded and welcomed the ninth grade. The building has been expanded two more times, once in 1988 and again in 1993. The 1993 expansion included a new media center, 12 classrooms, a section where the school can be expanded to a second floor, and a new gym called the field house.

In 1984 Springfield High School established Army JROTC. It is the only one in the area and one of only six in the State of Ohio. It is most noted for its outstanding drill team, which has received numerous awards, and attended several national competitions over the past several years.

== Blue Devil Band ==
The Blue Devil Band goes to many different parades and events. The band has marched in several major parades, including the Indianapolis 500 Parade, the Electric Parade in Downtown Disney, and several others. Many students participate in local and national honor bands including the OMEA District I Honor Band, the BGSU Honor Band, and the Ohio State Honor Band. They also participate in the annual Strawberry Parade at Homecoming Park in Holland Ohio

== Athletics ==
Springfield High School competes in the Northern Lakes League, made up of schools in northwest Ohio. SHS joined the league in 1962.

== Choir ==
The Springfield High School concert and chamber choirs have students participate in the OMEA District I Honor Band and OMEA Solo & Ensemble. They get mostly superior ratings every year.

== Blue Devil Drama ==
The Blue Devil Drama produces plays and musicals, typically a play in the fall and a musical in the spring. Recent productions include Cinderella (2022), Pride and Prejudice (2022) The Lightning Thief (2023), Les Misérables (2024), 25th Annual Putnam County Spelling Bee (2025), Hadestown (2026). The advanced theater class has staged one-act student-run productions including Rainbow Fish (2025) and Uranium Girls (2026).

== Notable alumni ==
- Rick Upchurch (1970): played wide receiver for Denver Broncos (1975–1983) In 2000, named one of 300 best NFL players of all time.
- Bryant Koback: played running back for the Minnesota Vikings, Seattle Seahawks and the Philadelphia Eagles
- Eric Page: played wide receiver for the Denver Broncos and Tampa Bay Buccaneers
