= Mary McGowan =

American politician

Member of the Ohio House of Representatives from the 42nd district
- In office 1962–1966

Personal details
- Born: Mary Elizabeth McGowan; April 25, 1885
- Died: March 15, 1980 (aged 94) Akron, Ohio, US
- Party: Democratic
- Occupation: Court reporter

Mary E. McGowan (1885–1980) was an Ohio politician and member of the Ohio House of Representatives from the 42nd district.

She was a member of the Democratic Party, and the first woman from the state of Ohio to be appointed a delegate to the Democratic National Convention.

== Early life ==
McGowan was born Mary Elizabeth McGowan in either her parents' native County Donegal, Ireland, or in Akron, Ohio, on April 25, 1885. A member of the Roman Catholic faith her whole life, she was educated at Akron's St. Vincent's (now St. Vincent–St. Mary High School) and went on to attend the Actual Business College, also in Akron.

== Career ==
McGowan began her career in politics, where she served as Summit County, Ohio probate recorder, a position she held for 20 years. She was also a Democratic District committeewoman from 1938 until her death in 1980, and was an alternate delegate to the Democratic National Convention in 1944 (representing the 14th District), and a delegate to the Convention in 1952, 1956 and 1964. In 1962, she ran successfully for a seat in the Ohio House 42nd District, serving on the Welfare Committee, and was re-elected in 1964. She did not run for reelection in 1966. In 1972, when she was 86, she ran unsuccessfully for a third term in the Ohio House of Representatives (winning the primary election but losing in the general election).

== Later life ==
Although she never married, McGowan came from a large Irish-Catholic family and was very proud of her Irish heritage. Her brother Dan was a Notre Dame graduate and instrumental in starting the boxing team there, as well as a member of the 1924 U.S. boxing team. She was an active member of St. Sebastian Church in Akron, and was a President of the Ancient Order of Hibernians Ladies Auxiliary.

Ms. McGowan was also a part of President John F. Kennedy's campaign and was friends with President Jimmy Carter.

McGowan died on March 15, 1980, after she failed to show up as the grand marshal for a St. Patrick's Day parade celebration in Akron, and was found dead in her home.
