= 2022 Hula Bowl =

American college football all-star game

- 76th Hula Bowl
Team Aina	Team Kai
20	21
Head coach: Mike Smith	Head coach: Brian Billick
	1	2	3	4	Total
Team Aina	3	7	7	3	20
Team Kai	0	14	7	0	21
- Date: January 15, 2022
- Season: 2021
- Stadium: Bounce House
- Location: Orlando, Florida
- MVP: Kai: Bryant Koback (RB, Toledo) & Tayler Hawkins (CB, San Diego State); Aina: Tavell Harris (WR, Washington State) & Luke Masterson (LB, Wake Forest)

United States TV coverage
- Network: CBS Sports Network

The 2022 Hula Bowl was a postseason college football all-star game played on January 15, 2022, with kickoff at 12:00 noon EST, at the Bounce House in Orlando, Florida. It was the first all-star contest of the 2021–22 bowl games and, while not restricted to FBS players, one of the final games of the 2021 FBS football season. Television coverage was provided by CBS Sports Network. This was the first playing of the Hula Bowl outside of Hawaii, due to Aloha Stadium near Honolulu being closed for renovations. The game rostered players into Aina and Kai teams, the words for land and sea in the Hawaiian language.

== Coaches ==
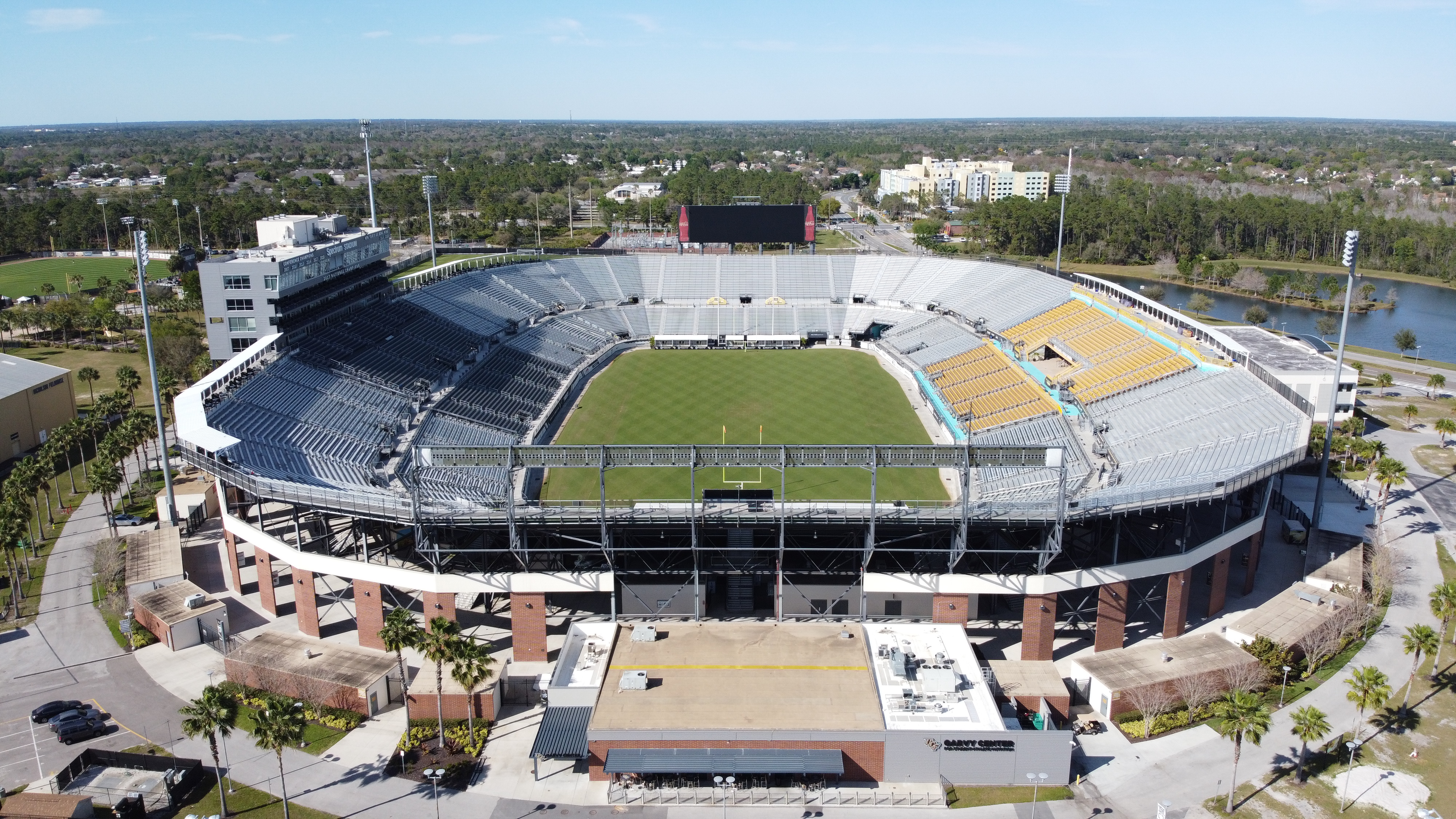
The Bounce House in February 2020

Team Aina was led by Mike Smith, former head coach of the Atlanta Falcons, while Team Kai will be led by Brian Billick, former head coach of the Baltimore Ravens. Complete coaching staffs were announced as follows:

Role	Team Aina	Team Kai
Head coach	Mike Smith	Brian Billick
Offensive coordinator	Ron Turner	Brian Billick
Defensive coordinator	Tim Lewis	Wade Phillips
Offensive line	Tony Wise	Mike Tice
Tight ends	Jonathan Hayes	Taylor Jones
Wide receivers	Jonathan Hayes	Kevin Sumlin
Running backs	Gerald Brown	Scott Phillips Jr
Defensive line	Jay Hayes	Bill Johnson
Linebackers	Bob Sanders	Steve Thompson
Defensive backs	Andrew Weidinger	Carnell Lake

== Game ==
Player invitations were determined by the Hula Bowl Selection Committee led by directors of Scouting, Damond Talbot, Scott Phillips Jr, and Jimmy Williams, primarily based on "potential to make a professional Football team roster". Team Kai wore blue uniforms and Team Aina wore black uniforms.

== Game summary ==
2022 Hula Bowl

Quarter	1	2	3	4	Total
Aina	3	7	7	3	20
Kai	0	14	7	0	21

at Bounce House • Orlando, Florida

- Date: Saturday, January 15, 2022
- Game time: 12:00 p.m. EST
- TV: CBS Sports Network

Game information

First quarter

- 3:47 Aina – Nick Sciba (Wake Forest) 52-yard field goal. Aina 3–0

Second quarter

- 12:32 Aina – Drew Ogletree (Youngstown State) 6-yard pass from Anthony Brown (Oregon), kick good. Aina 10–0
- 1:56 Kai – Bryant Koback (Toledo) 2-yard rush, kick good. Aina 10–7
- 0:03 Kai – Raheem Blackshear (Virginia Tech) 1-yard rush, kick good. Kai 14–10

Third quarter

- 5:48 Kai – Tayler Hawkins (San Diego State) 44-yard interception return, kick good. Kai 21–10
- 4:08 Aina – Travelle Harris (Washington State) 72-yard reception from Brandon Peters (Illinois), kick good. Kai 21–17

Fourth quarter

- 7:57 Aina – Nick Sciba (Wake Forest) 26-yard field goal. Kai 21–20

== See also ==
- 2022 NFL draft
