= Carla Chapman =

American basketball player

Personal information
- Born: November 8, 1962 (age 64) Akron, Ohio, U.S.
- Listed height: 6 ft 2 in (1.88 m)
- Listed weight: 150 lb (68 kg)

Career information
- High school: St. Vincent – St. Mary (Akron, Ohio)
- College: Ohio State (1981–1985)
- Position: Center
- Number: 22

Carla L. Chapman Sibley (born Carla Chapman) is an American former basketball player for Ohio State University, Ohio, United States. She played on the girls' basketball team at St. Vincent-St. Mary's, preceding fellow St. Vincent alumni, like Jerome Lane and LeBron James.

== Career ==
=== High school ===
During her four years at St. Vincent-St. Mary her junior and senior years were the most memorable as she led her team to two Ohio High School Athletic Association (OHSAA), AAA state championships. During her last season she averaged 25 points/game and 20 rebounds, earning her a fourth team spot on Parade Magazine's All-America list. This was a perfect segue to her collegiate basketball career with the Ohio State Lady Buckeyes.

=== College ===
Carla played four years of varsity basketball with the Lady Buckeyes, establishing herself as a dominant player under Coach Tara Van Derveer, while helping the Lady Buckeyes capture four Big 10 Championships from 1982 through '85. During her years in the Buckeyes lineup, OSU compiled seasons of 20-7, 23-5, 22-7 and 28-3, respectively. In 1985 Lady Buckeyes reached the NCAA East Regional final before being eliminated. Her career total of 1,247 points and 633 rebounds in 99 games was outstanding. She earned first team All-Big Ten honors with a scoring average of 15.3 points/game in 1984 and 7.2 rebounds/game in 1983. She was voted one of the Sports Figures of the Century by Akron Beacon Journal sports fans in 1999 and, a year later, she was inducted into the Summit County Sports Hall of Fame and the St. Vincent-St. Mary's Sports Hall of Fame.

=== Coaching ===
After receiving her B.A. from Ohio State in 1985 Carla returned to the Akron area where she has continued to make a name for herself as a community liaison and director of special programs for the Akron Public School District. Upon completing her M.A. at Akron U in 1994 she began working for the school district in a number of capacities, including coach of the Garfield High School Girls Basketball team from 1998-2001. In spite of the fact that she had taken them from losing seasons to winning seasons, she resigned from that position to focus on the health issues of her daughter Raina. Two years later she returned to Garfield as the only female coach of a boys basketball team in the state of Ohio. She held that position from 2003-2004 before retiring from the sports world all together. Although, she is not actively involved in sports at this time, Carla is still remembered as one of the "Best of the Best of Summit County," as evidenced by her inclusion in 2006 on a list of the 50 greatest athletes from Summit County. She graces this list, right alongside sports immortals Fritz Pollard, Larry Csonka, Nate Thurmond and Gus Johnson. Notably missing from this list is LeBron James. Apparently, he's too young to make the list, yet.

=== Akron Public Schools ===
Carla has been just as successful off the court as she was on the court. From 1994 to the present she's been employed by the Akron Public School Board. She began her work in the schools as the Enterprise Community Family Services Liaison for several inner-city schools in low-income neighborhoods coordinating student and family support services, including after-school programs, health services, academic interventions and case management. Not long after taking this position she also began coaching the Garfield Girls Basketball team, which might seem an odd combination to many, but for Carla it was a natural, for as she found every student athlete had a backstory full of all kinds of challenges that had to be dealt with before they ever got on the court and long after they left the court. Carla dealt with these problems as she coached the girls and the boys alike. The only thing that distracted her being the care of her own children Raina and Jeff, Jr.

In 1997 she became a social services specialist for the district and began coordinating several local, state and federal grant projects serving students in grades K-12, bringing many organizations together in creative partnerships with APS. In 2003-2009 she acted as a Special Projects Coordinator for the district, during which time she instituted a new program called Perkins Activities Central, which received high accolades in Northeast Ohio as a best practices program. WKYC-TV featured the program in their 2006 documentary, “Making the Grade: Helping our Kids Achieve.”

Carla continues to reside in Akron, Ohio with her husband Jeff Sibley and their two children Raina and Jeff, Jr.
