= St. Vincent–St. Mary High School =

Catholic school in Akron, Ohio, United States

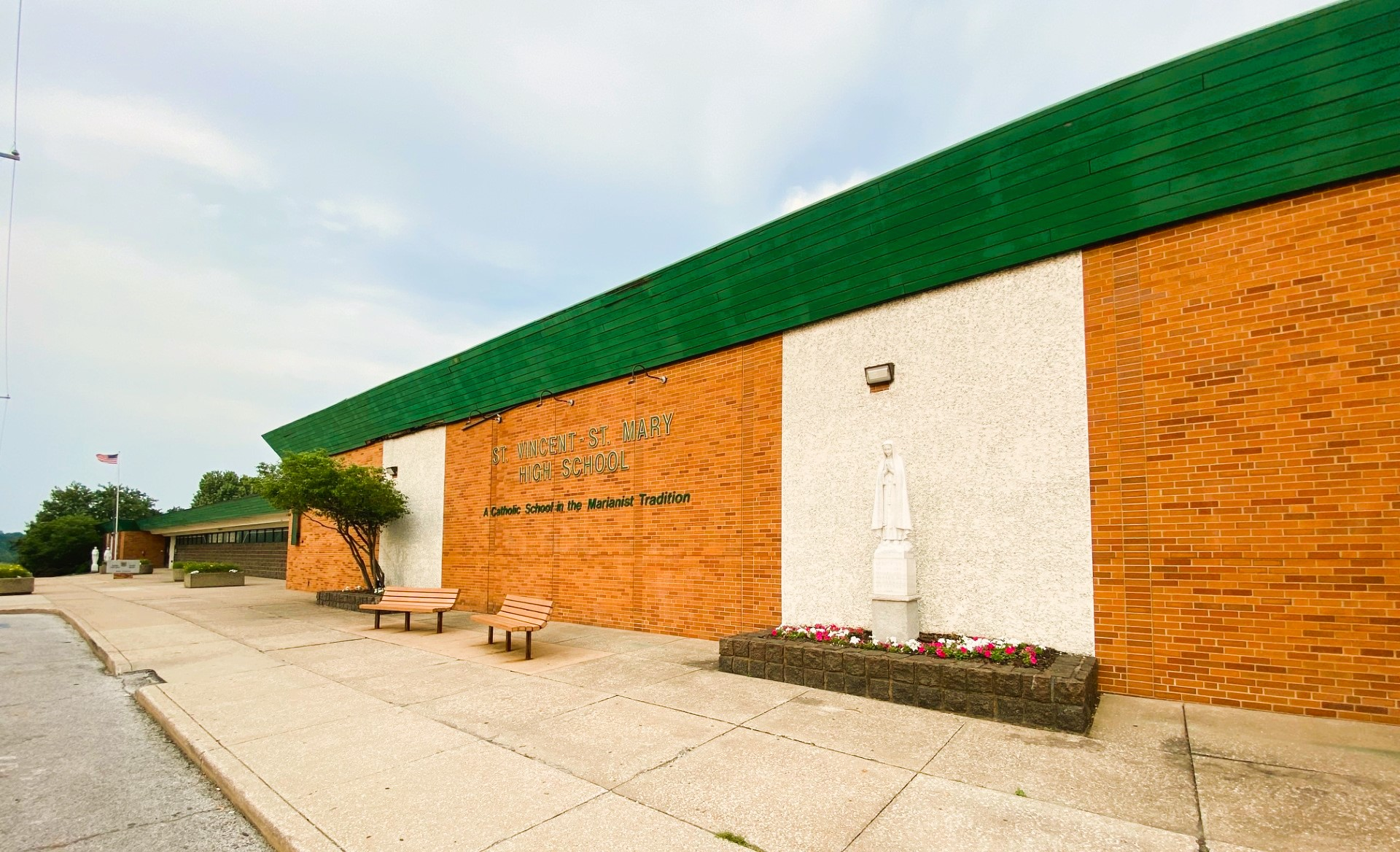

Location
- 15 North Maple Street; Akron, Ohio 44303; United States; 41°5′19″N 81°31′21″W

Information
- Type: Private; College-preparatory; Catholic school
- Motto: Your Foundation, Your Future
- Religious affiliation: Roman Catholic
- Established: 1897 (St. Mary); 1906 (St. Vincent); 1972 (merger)
- Oversight: Society of Mary
- NCES School ID: 01058639
- President: Mark Butterworth
- Dean: Dan Larlham
- Grades: 9–12
- Gender: Co-ed
- Enrollment: 638 (2017–18)
- Average class size: 23
- Colors: Green; Vegas gold
- Athletics: Basketball, bowling, baseball, cross country, football, golf, gymnastics, lacrosse, softball, soccer, swimming, tennis, track and field, wrestling, volleyball
- Team name: Fighting Irish
- Rivals: Archbishop Hoban; Walsh Jesuit
- Accreditations: Ohio Catholic School Accrediting Association; Ohio Department of Education
- Newspaper: The Leprechaun Gold
- Yearbook: The Phoenix
- School fees: Student fee: $425
- Tuition: $14,450 (2024–25)
- Affiliation: Roman Catholic Diocese of Cleveland
- Website: stvm.com

St. Vincent–St. Mary High School is a four-year private college preparatory Catholic high school in Akron, Ohio, United States. It is sponsored by the Society of Mary and is associated with the Diocese of Cleveland. As of the 2017–18 school year, the school had an enrollment of 638 students.

== History ==
The current St. Vincent–St. Mary High School was formed by the merger of St. Vincent and St. Mary High Schools in 1972. The newly merged school took on the athletic nickname of St. Vincent, the Fighting Irish.

=== St. Mary High School ===
In 1887, Richard Gilmour, then Bishop of Cleveland, had commissioned Rev. Dr. Thomas F. Mahar, pastor of St. Vincent Church, the oldest Catholic church in Akron, to establish a mission in south Akron. St. Mary Parish was founded by Rev. Mahar in 1896. The high school was founded a year later. St. Mary's athletic teams were formerly known as the Crusaders.

=== St. Vincent High School ===
A high school was opened in September 1906 to provide parishioners' sons with a classical education beyond grade school. The parish had already opened St. Vincent Grade School, Akron's oldest Catholic school still in operation. At the time of the merger, St. Vincent High School had graduated over 6,000 students.

In May 2013, St. Vincent–St. Mary alumnus LeBron James donated $1 million to the school for the purpose of renovating their basketball arena. The project included the installation of a new basketball floor, scoreboard, locker rooms, and bleachers, and the seating capacity, which was raised from 1,600 to 1,831. The subsequently renamed LeBron James Arena now also serves as home of the American Basketball Association's Akron Aviators.

== Athletics ==
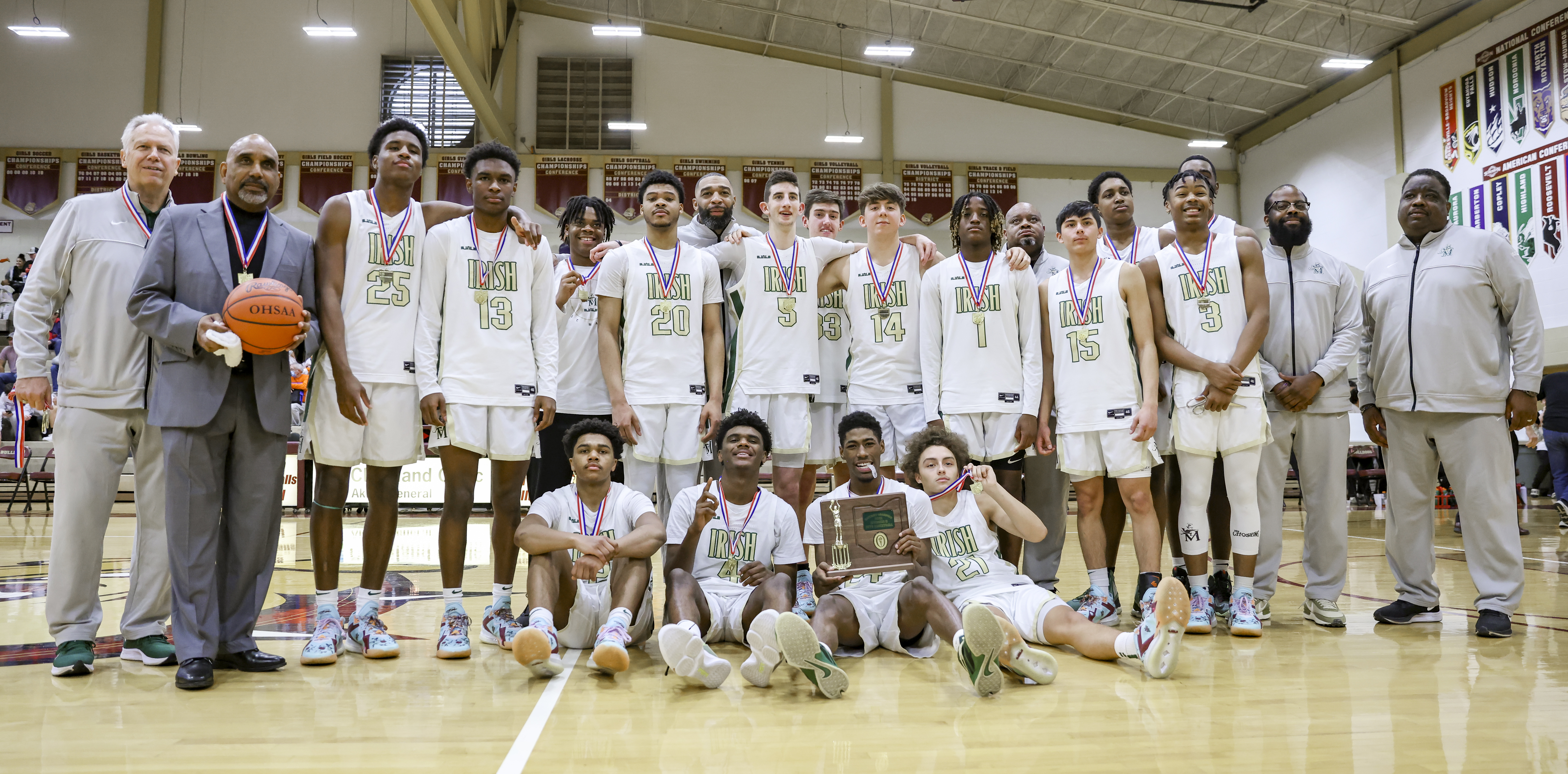
The St. Vincent–St. Mary boys' basketball team celebrating a district championship in 2022

STVM'S biggest rivals include Archbishop Hoban High School and Walsh Jesuit High School.

=== State championships ===
- Football – 1972, 1981, 1982, 1988, 2012, 2013
- Boys basketball – 1984, 2000, 2001, 2003, 2009, 2011, 2017, 2018, 2021, 2022
- Baseball – 1986, 1989
- Wrestling – 2001
- Girls cross country – 2009, 2010, 2011, 2012, 2013
- Girls basketball – 1979, 1980, 1995
- Girls softball – 1979, 1984
- Boys track – 2011, 2013
- Girls track – 2012

=== Won by St. Mary High School ===
- Boys golf – 1927

=== Won by St. Vincent High School ===
- Boys basketball – 1929

== Notable alumni ==
- Jibri Blount (2015), professional football player in the NFL
- Malaki Branham (2021), professional basketball player in the NBA
- Parris Campbell (2014), professional football player in the NFL
- Maverick Carter (2000), sports-marketing businessman
- Carla Chapman (1981), former college basketball player
- Doran Grant (2011), professional football player in the NFL
- Jayvon Graves (2017), professional basketball player who plays overseas
- Jalen Hudson (2014), professional basketball player who played overseas
- LeBron James (2003), professional basketball player in the NBA
- Dru Joyce III (2003), college basketball head basketball coach
- V. J. King (2016 - transferred), professional basketball player who plays overseas
- Niko Lalos (2016), professional football player in the NFL
- Jerome Lane (1985), professional basketball player in the National Basketball Association (NBA)
- Joe Salem (2005), soccer player
- JaKarr Sampson (2011 - transferred), professional basketball player in the NBA
- Frank Stams (1983), professional football player in the National Football League (NFL)
- Romeo Travis (2003), professional basketball player who played overseas
- Savion Washington (2020), professional football player in the NFL
- Brian Windhorst (1996), author and reporter for ESPN
- Donatas Zavackas (1999), basketball executive, played overseas

=== St. Vincent High School ===
- Lou Baldacci (1952), professional football player in the NFL
- Chuck Chuckovits (1930), professional basketball player in the National Basketball League
- Fritz Graf (1940), official in the NFL
- Art Hunter (1951), professional football player in the NFL
- William Jurgens (1946), Catholic priest
- Tony Laterza (1946), college basketball head coach
- Mary McGowan (1903), Ohio politician
- Sandra Pianalto (1972), former president of the United States Federal Reserve
