= Bryant Koback =

American football player (born 1998)

No. 40
- Position: Running back

Personal information
- Born: April 6, 1998 (age 28); Holland, Ohio, U.S.
- Listed height: 6 ft 0 in (1.83 m)
- Listed weight: 210 lb (95 kg)

Career information
- High school: Springfield (Holland, Ohio)
- College: Kentucky (2017); Toledo (2018–2021)
- NFL draft: 2022: undrafted

Career history
- Minnesota Vikings (2022)*; Seattle Seahawks (2023)*; Philadelphia Eagles (2023)*; Seattle Seahawks (2023)*
- * Offseason or practice squad member only

Awards and highlights
- First-team All-MAC (2021)
- Stats at Pro Football Reference

Bryant Nathaniel Koback (born April 6, 1998) is an American former professional football player who was a running back in the National Football League (NFL). He played college football for the Toledo Rockets. He spent two years in the NFL with the Minnesota Vikings, Seattle Seahawks, and Philadelphia Eagles, but never appeared in a game.

== Early life ==
Koback attended Springfield High School in Holland, Ohio. He played in four games his senior year before suffering a season-ending broken leg. During his career he had over 4,400 yards and 57 touchdowns. He committed to play college football at the University of Kentucky.

== College career ==
Koback attended Kentucky in 2017, but did not play in any games. In 2018, he transferred to the University of Toledo. In his first year with the Rockets in 2018, he led the team with 917 rushing yards on 153 carries with 14 touchdowns. In 2019, Koback rushed for 1,187 yards on 195 carries with 12 touchdowns. In 2020, he had 522 yards on 123 carries with four touchdowns and in 2021, he had 1,407 yards on 208 carries with 15 touchdowns. At the end of his college career, he played in the 2022 Hula Bowl, where he was named the offensive MVP of his team.

== Professional career ==
Pre-draft measurables
Height	Weight	Arm length	Hand span	40-yard dash	10-yard split	20-yard split	20-yard shuttle	Three-cone drill	Vertical jump	Broad jump	Bench press
5 ft 10 3/4 in (1.80 m)	209 lb (95 kg)	31 1/8 in (0.79 m)	9 1/8 in (0.23 m)	4.49 s	1.55 s	2.50 s	4.27 s	7.03 s	40.5 in (1.03 m)	10 ft 4 in (3.15 m)	28 reps
All values from Pro Day

=== Minnesota Vikings ===
Koback was signed by the Minnesota Vikings as a undrafted free agent on May 2, 2022. He was waived on August 30, 2022, and re-signed to the practice squad the next day.

=== Seattle Seahawks ===
On May 10, 2023, Koback signed with the Seattle Seahawks. He was waived on August 23, 2023, and later re-signed to the practice squad, but released shortly after.

=== Philadelphia Eagles ===
On September 20, 2023, Koback was signed to the Philadelphia Eagles practice squad. On October 16, 2023, he was released from the practice squad.

=== Seattle Seahawks (second stint) ===
The Seahawks signed Bryant to their practice squad on October 24, 2023. He signed a reserve/future contract on January 8, 2024. However, Koback retired from professional football on April 9.
