= Springfield Local School District (Lucas County) =

School district in Ohio, United States

Address
- 6924 Spring Valley Dr. Holland, Ohio, 43528; United States
- Coordinates: 41°36′45.5″N 83°42′25.6″W

District information
- Type: Public
- Motto: "Exceptional Education for Today's Learners and Tomorrow's Leaders"
- Grades: PreK–12
- Established: 1893; 133 years ago
- NCES District ID: 3904822

Students and staff
- Students: 3,435 (2020–2021)
- Teachers: 198.2 (on an FTE basis)
- Staff: 389.9 (on an FTE basis)
- Student–teacher ratio: 17.33:1

Other information
- Website: www.springfield-schools.org

Springfield Local School District is a school district in Northwest Ohio, United States. The school district serves students who live in the village of Holland and Springfield Township as well as portions of Maumee, Toledo, and Monclova Township in Lucas County. The superintendent is Matt Geha.

== Springfield High School ==
- Springfield High School serves students in grades 9–12. The principal at Springfield High School is Robb Brown.

== Springfield Middle School ==
Adjacent to Holland Elementary School are the 58 classrooms, gymnasium, and "café-nasium" that comprise Springfield Middle School. Once a "junior high school", Springfield Middle School is now configured with teacher teams called "houses" or "teams" that provide students in grade 6–8 with an organizational structure anchored by an interdisciplinary team approach to instruction. Core subject matter in taught within a smaller-sized per group of approximately 100 students per house. The principal at Springfield Middle School is Jeff Pendry, who supervises a staff of 98.

In 1988, SJHS was expanded and connected to Holland Elementary. In the early 1990s with enrollment increasing and nowhere to expand current buildings, it was decided to split Holland Elementary into two schools and make SJHS a middle school. Since Holland was losing half of its enrollment and one whole grade, SJHS took over a portion of the school. The 1994–1995 school year was the first year the junior high included grade 6 and officially became Springfield Middle School.

Like SHS, the middle school's colors are blue and white and the mascot is the Blue Devil. While a junior high, it ran like a high school until 1991. In 1991 the school slowly started to run more like a middle school with teachers teaching in teams.

== Elementary schools ==
SLS currently operates four elementary schools: Crissey, Dorr, Holland and Holloway. Crissey, Dorr and Holland all housed grades K-8 until 1967 and grades K-6 until 1994. They now house grades K-3 as of now. Holloway was built to split Holland (which had an enrollment of 1000+ in 1992, while Crissey and Dorr had about 500) in 1993. Due to levy issues, it did not open until the 1994–1995 school year. It was built to house grades K-5.

In 1942, Crissey Elementary School was a three-classroom schoolhouse. Additions and renovations to Crissey through the years have increased classroom space to accommodate the growing number of students in attendance. Oatis Amick serves as principal and oversees a staff of 44 and 450 students.

In 1900, Dorr Street School was opened and they nicknamed it "rabbit center" because of the rural location and its propensity to wildlife. In 1942, Dorr Street had four teachers and a teaching principal. Through the years Dorr Elementary has also seen many changes. Currently, Dorr Elementary School has 470 students, 31 classrooms and a staff of 44. Dorr Elementary’s mascot are the Dragons. Principal at Dorr Elementary School is Mrs. Jenna Moden as of 2025.

Holland Elementary was originally built in the 1920s. As with all of the other elementary schools, Holland too needed to grow. So through the years, additional classroom space has been added. Following the previously mentioned renovations between 2005 and 2007, Holland has 33 classrooms, 550 students and a staff of 48 as of 2014–15. The Hawk is the school’s mascot. Hilary Steinmiller was named principal in 2014.

In 1992, Springfield Township again supported its school system and voted a bond issue to fund a new elementary school. In 1994, Holloway Elementary School opened for the 1994–95 school year. Holloway is located on Pilliod Road and currently educates 461 students in 28 classrooms. The Hornet is the school’s mascot. Principal for Holloway Elementary is Ryan Machoukas who supervises a staff of 46.
