= Niko Lalos =

American football player (born 1997)

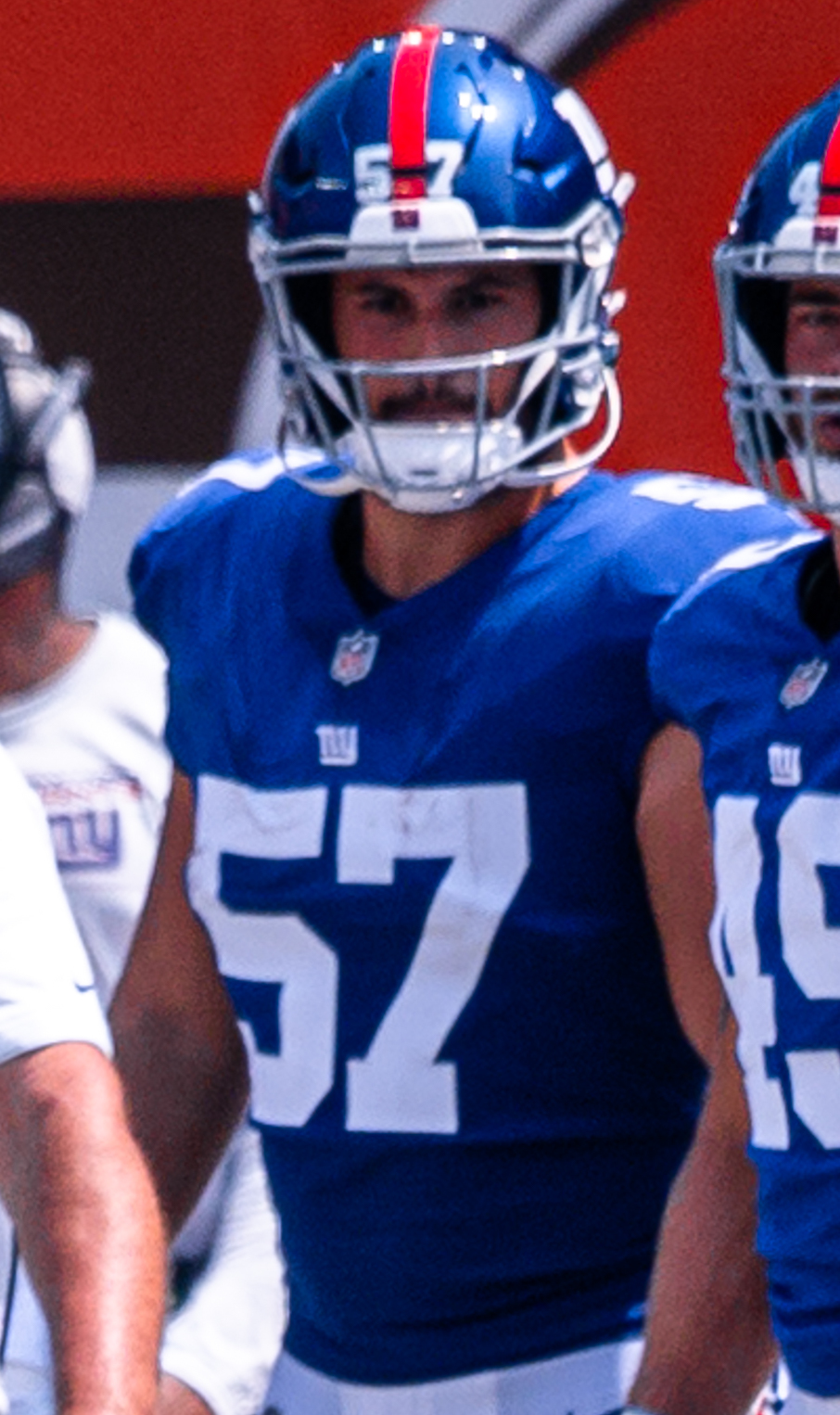
- Lalos with the New York Giants in 2021

Profile
- Position: Long snapper

Personal information
- Born: June 25, 1997 (age 29); Akron, Ohio, U.S.
- Listed height: 6 ft 5 in (1.96 m)
- Listed weight: 269 lb (122 kg)

Career information
- High school: St. Vincent–St. Mary (Akron, Ohio)
- College: Dartmouth (2016–2019)
- NFL draft: 2020: undrafted

Career history
- New York Giants (2020–2021); New Orleans Saints (2022)*; Seattle Sea Dragons (2023); New Orleans Saints (2023–2024)*; New England Patriots (2026)*
- * Offseason or practice squad member only

Awards and highlights
- First-team All-Ivy League (2019)

Career NFL statistics as of 2023
- Total tackles: 6
- Fumble recoveries: 1
- Pass deflections: 1
- Interceptions: 1
- Stats at Pro Football Reference

Nikolas A. Lalos (born June 25, 1997) is an American professional football long snapper. He played college football for the Dartmouth Big Green.

== Early life ==
Lalos grew up in Akron, Ohio, and attended St. Vincent–St. Mary High School, where he played basketball and football.

== College career ==
Lalos was a member of the Dartmouth Big Green for four seasons, playing on the junior varsity team as a freshman before lettering in the final three seasons. As a senior, he was named first-team All-Ivy League after recording 35 tackles with a team-high 10 tackles for loss and 5.5 sacks as well as seven passes broken up and an interception, which he returned 22 yards for a touchdown. Lalos finished his collegiate career with 59 tackles, 17.5 tackles for loss, 11 sacks, an interception and a fumble recovery in 24 games played. After his senior season, Lalos played in the 2020 Hula Bowl and was named the defensive MVP of the game after making six tackles with two sacks and a forced fumble.

== Professional career ==
Pre-draft measurables
Height	Weight	Arm length	Hand span	Wingspan
6 ft 4 5/8 in (1.95 m)	268 lb (122 kg)	33 1/4 in (0.84 m)	9 1/2 in (0.24 m)	6 ft 5 1/8 in (1.96 m)
All values from Pro Day

=== New York Giants ===
Lalos was signed by the New York Giants as an undrafted free agent on April 25, 2020 as a defensive end. He was waived during final roster cuts on September 5, and was re-signed to the team's practice squad the following day. Lalos was elevated to the active roster on November 28, and made his NFL debut the following day against the Cincinnati Bengals in Week 12. He received a Twitter shout-out from fellow St. Vincent–St. Mary High School alum LeBron James on the morning of his first career game. Lalos went on to catch a deflected pass thrown by Bengals quarterback Brandon Allen for a game-altering interception while playing limited defensive snaps in the 19–17 victory. He was elevated to the active roster again the following week against the Seattle Seahawks and recovered a fumble on a mishandled snap by Seattle's Russell Wilson during the 17–12 win. The Giants signed Lalos to their active roster on December 8.

On August 31, 2021, Lalos was waived by the Giants and was re-signed to the practice squad the next day. He signed a reserve/futures contract with the Giants on January 10, 2022. On August 5, Lalos was waived by New York.

=== New Orleans Saints ===
On August 15, 2022, Lalos signed with the New Orleans Saints. He was waived by the Saints on August 30. Lalos was re-signed to New Orleans' practice squad on November 16.

=== Seattle Sea Dragons ===
On November 17, 2022, Lalos was drafted by the Seattle Sea Dragons of the XFL. He finished the season with 35 tackles, seven tackles for loss, and 1.5 sacks with one forced fumble and one interception. Lalos was released from his contract on May 15, 2023.

=== New Orleans Saints (second stint) ===
On May 16, 2023, Lalos signed with the New Orleans Saints, marking his second stint with the team. He was waived by the Saints on August 29, and was re-signed to the team's practice squad. Following the end of the regular season, the Saints signed Lalos to a reserve/future contract on January 8, 2024.

On August 27, 2024, Lalos was waived by the Saints as part of final roster cuts and was re-signed to their practice squad. On November 5, Lalos was waived again by New Orleans.

=== New England Patriots ===
On March 16, 2026, Lalos signed with the New England Patriots as a long snapper. He was released by the Patriots on May 20. On August 10, Lalos re-signed with the Patriots. However, he was waived by New England again on August 15.
