= Luke Masterson =

American football player (born 1998)

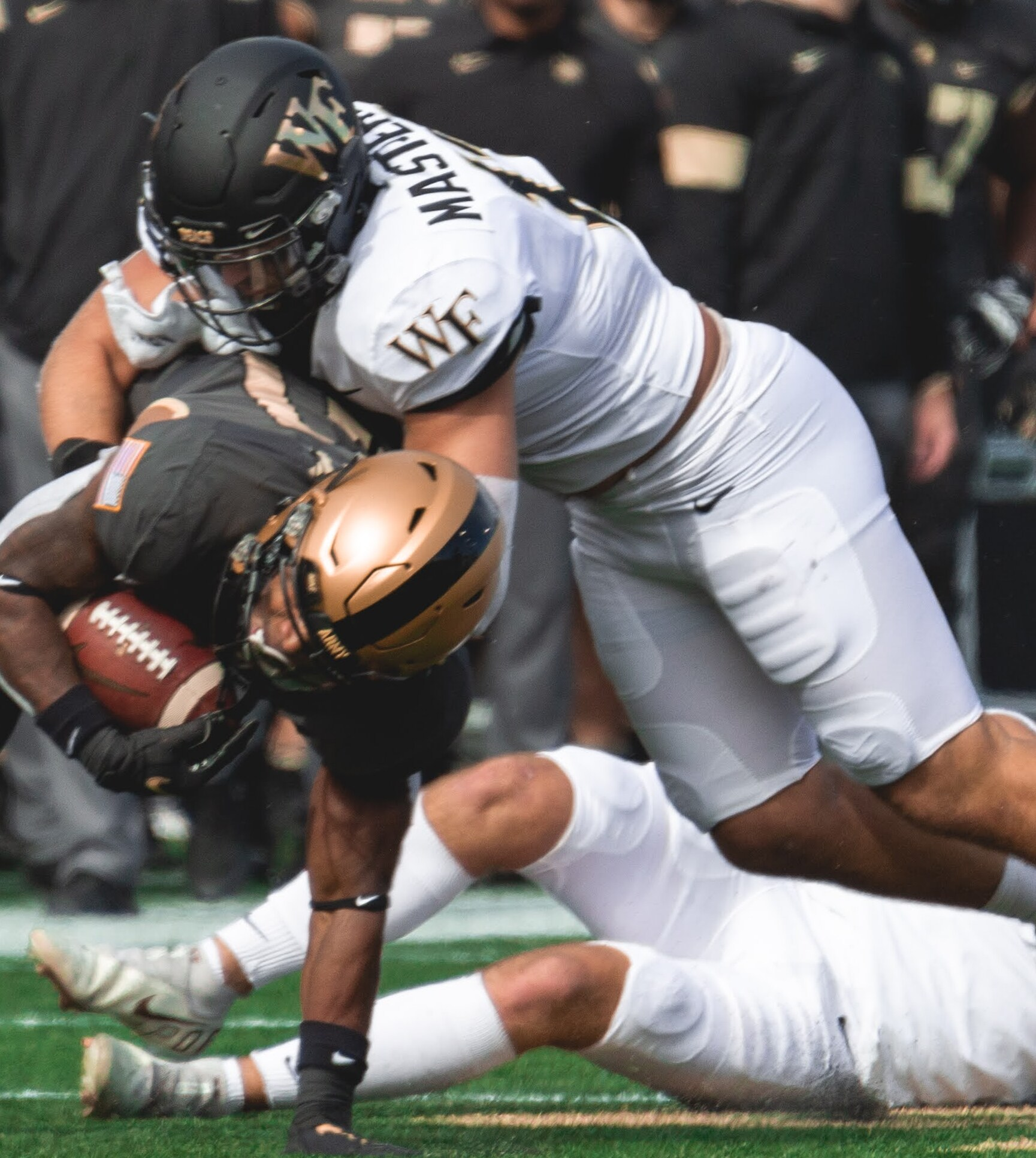
- Masterson making a tackle for Wake Forest in 2021

Profile
- Position: Linebacker

Personal information
- Born: January 7, 1998 (age 28); Naples, Florida, U.S.
- Listed height: 6 ft 1 in (1.85 m)
- Listed weight: 220 lb (100 kg)

Career information
- High school: Gulf Coast (Naples)
- College: Wake Forest (2016–2021)
- NFL draft: 2022: undrafted

Career history
- Las Vegas Raiders (2022–2024); St. Louis Battlehawks (2026)*
- * Offseason or practice squad member only

Career NFL statistics as of 2024
- Total tackles: 103
- Forced fumbles: 2
- Pass deflections: 1
- Stats at Pro Football Reference

Luke Masterson (born January 7, 1998) is an American professional football linebacker who most recently played for the Las Vegas Raiders of the National Football League (NFL). He played college football for the Wake Forest Demon Deacons.

== College career ==
Masterson was a member of the Wake Forest Demon Deacons for six seasons. Masterson made 85 tackles in his final season. At the end of his college career, he played in the 2022 Hula Bowl, and was named defensive MVP of his team.

== Professional career ==
Pre-draft measurables
Height	Weight	Arm length	Hand span	40-yard dash	10-yard split	20-yard split	20-yard shuttle	Three-cone drill	Vertical jump	Broad jump	Bench press
6 ft 2 in (1.88 m)	234 lb (106 kg)	31 5/8 in (0.80 m)	9 1/4 in (0.23 m)	4.65 s	1.62 s	2.69 s	4.29 s	7.00 s	34.5 in (0.88 m)	9 ft 6 in (2.90 m)	17 reps
All values from Pro Day

Masterson signed with the Las Vegas Raiders as an undrafted free agent on May 12, 2022. He made the Raiders' initial 53-man roster out of training camp.
