= Holland, Ohio =

- Village
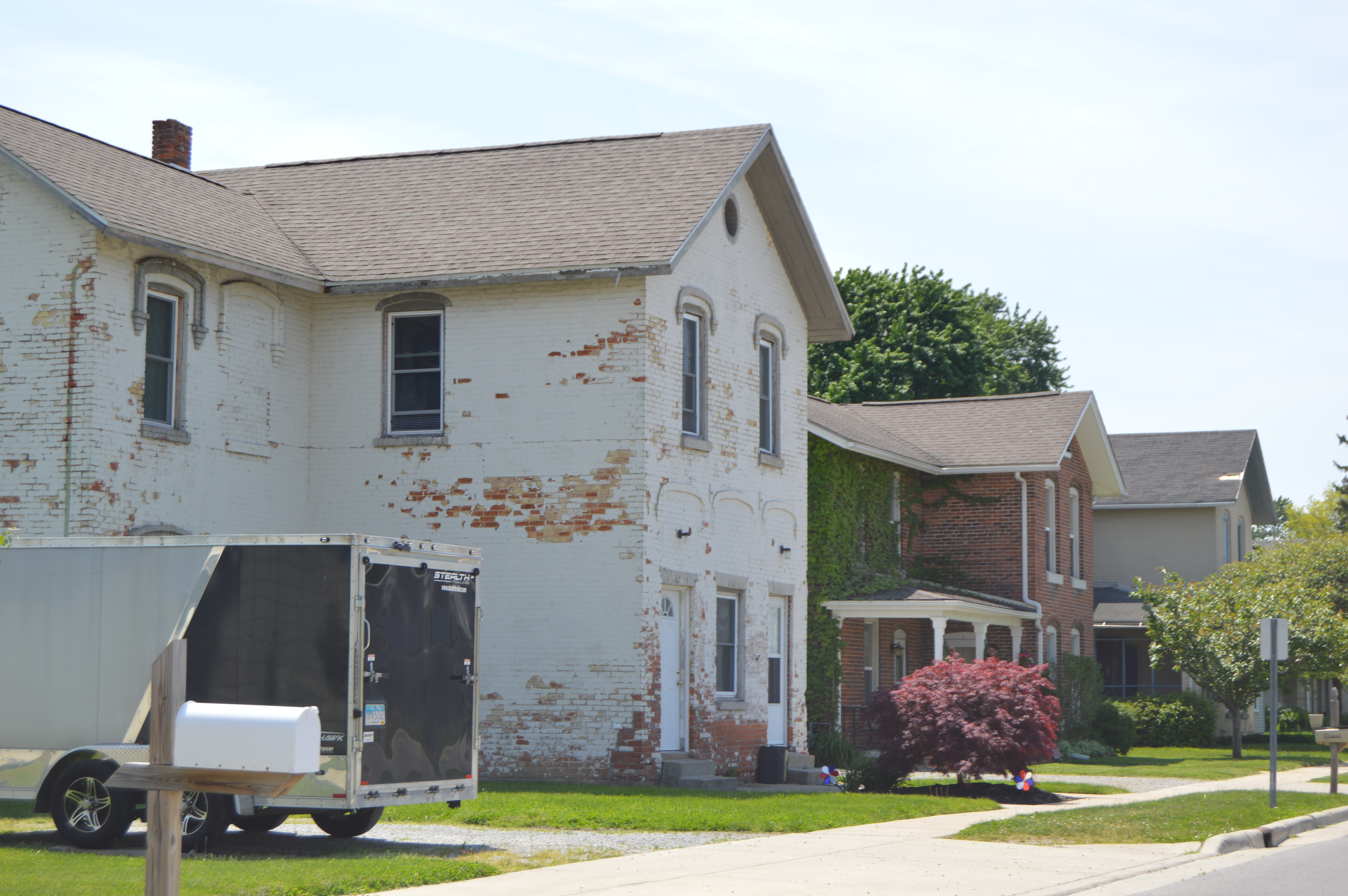
- Houses on Railroad Street

- Location in Lucas County and the state of Ohio
- Coordinates: 41°37′25″N 83°42′35″W
- Country: United States
- State: Ohio
- County: Lucas

Government
  - Mayor: Ryan Spangler (R)

Area
  - Total: 0.99 sq mi (2.56 km^{2})
  - Land: 0.99 sq mi (2.56 km^{2})
  - Water: 0 sq mi (0.00 km^{2})
- Elevation: 637 ft (194 m)

Population (2020)
  - Total: 1,820
  - Estimate (2023): 1,794
  - Density: 1,842.8/sq mi (711.52/km^{2})
- Time zone: UTC-5 (Eastern (EST))
  - Summer (DST): UTC-4 (EDT)
- ZIP code: 43528
- Area code: 419
- FIPS code: 39-35882
- GNIS feature ID: 2398524
- Website: https://www.hollandohio.com/

Holland is a village in eastern Springfield Township, Lucas County, Ohio, United States. Holland is a suburb of Toledo. The population was 1,664 at the 2020 census.

== History ==
The first name of the village was Drakes, which possibly came from the name of a family or was in reference to the large number of male ducks that did and still fly over the area. Later the crossroads called itself Hardy, which is probably taken from Samuel Hardy, who was one of the signers of a document (along with Thomas Jefferson, Arthur Lee and James Monroe) that ceded the northwest territories of Virginia to the government of the United States. He was a member of the Continental Congress in 1783-1785 and had been a lieutenant governor of Virginia.

The name of Holland has been thought to have come from the fact that ditches being dug in the 1850s to divert the swamp water reminded people of the canals of Holland. Some have said the name was given because of the large number of Dutch people in the area, but there were more New Englanders and New Yorkers in the early settlements than there were Dutchmen. The most likely derivation of the name comes from a story about Franklin Hall (an early house builder in the area) that states when he platted the land for the building of his houses, he asked that it be called Hall Land. Supposedly, the clerk or other official changed the “a” to an “o” and eliminated one “l”, thus Holland.

On May 22, 1852, the first train ran between Toledo and Chicago, on two roads, the Michigan Southern and the Indiana Northern. Three years later, the two railroads consolidated and the Air Line began traversing the rails from Toledo to Elkhart, Indiana. Records of the Erie and Kalamazoo Railroad show a station in the area in 1860 with no name, but freight and passengers from that site. In their records of 1880, it shows Holland having a population of 230 people, with the tons of freight increasing almost 20 times while the number of passengers increased by approximately 400% from 1860 to 1880.

In the early 1860s, Robert Clark began developing land north of the railroad and Franklin Hall built houses south of the railroad. Their names are still memorialized in those respective areas by Clark and Hall Streets.

== Geography ==
According to the United States Census Bureau, the village has a total area of 0.99 square miles (2.56 km^{2}), all land.

== Demographics ==
Historical population
Census	Pop.	Note	%±
1880	95		—
1930	503		—
1940	607		20.7%
1950	714		17.6%
1960	924		29.4%
1970	1,108		19.9%
1980	1,048		−5.4%
1990	1,210		15.5%
2000	1,306		7.9%
2010	1,764		35.1%
2020	1,820		3.2%
2023 (est.)	1,794	▼	−1.4%
U.S. Decennial Census

=== 2010 census ===
As of the census of 2010, there were 1,764 people, 749 households, and 430 families living in the village. The population density was 1,781.8 inhabitants per square mile (688.0/km^{2}). There were 782 housing units at an average density of 789.9 per square mile (305.0/km^{2}). The racial makeup of the village was 84.1% White, 10.4% African American, 0.3% Native American, 2.9% Asian, 1.0% from other races, and 1.2% from two or more races. Hispanic or Latino of any race were 4.0% of the population.

There were 749 households, of which 26.8% had children under the age of 18 living with them, 44.3% were married couples living together, 8.5% had a female householder with no husband present, 4.5% had a male householder with no wife present, and 42.6% were non-families. 37.0% of all households were made up of individuals, and 21.4% had someone living alone who was 65 years of age or older. The average household size was 2.23 and the average family size was 2.96.

The median age in the village was 45.2 years. 21% of residents were under the age of 18; 7.1% were between the ages of 18 and 24; 21.5% were from 25 to 44; 27.5% were from 45 to 64; and 23% were 65 years of age or older. The gender makeup of the village was 45.9% male and 54.1% female.

=== 2000 census ===
As of the census of 2000, there were 1,306 people, 522 households, and 292 families living in the village. The population density was 1,507.1 inhabitants per square mile (581.9/km^{2}). There were 553 housing units at an average density of 638.2 per square mile (246.4/km^{2}). The racial makeup of the village was 94.64% White, 1.68% African American, 0.08% Native American, 2.07% Asian, 0.08% Pacific Islander, 0.38% from other races, and 1.07% from two or more races. Hispanic or Latino of any race were 2.22% of the population.

There were 522 households, out of which 25.7% had children under the age of 18 living with them, 45.2% were married couples living together, 7.1% had a female householder with no husband present, and 43.9% were non-families. 40.0% of all households were made up of individuals, and 26.4% had someone living alone who was 65 years of age or older. The average household size was 2.23 and the average family size was 3.06.

In the village, the population was spread out, with 22.4% under the age of 18, 5.9% from 18 to 24, 24.7% from 25 to 44, 17.0% from 45 to 64, and 29.9% who were 65 years of age or older. The median age was 42 years. For every 100 females there were 82.1 males. For every 100 females age 18 and over, there were 75.0 males.

The median income for a household in the village was $33,669, and the median income for a family was $45,500. Males had a median income of $35,938 versus $25,795 for females. The per capita income for the village was $18,196. About 3.1% of families and 7.9% of the population were below the poverty line, including 9.4% of those under age 18 and 10.1% of those age 65 or over.

== Education ==
The Springfield Local School District operates Springfield High School in the village.

Holland has a public library, a branch of the Toledo-Lucas County Public Library.

== Notable people ==
- Alexander A. Drabik, first American soldier to cross the Rhine River into Germany
- Joe the Plumber, conservative activist and commentator
- Rick Upchurch, NFL Denver Broncos
