= Reggie Walker (linebacker, born 1996) =

American football player (born 1996)

No. 51
- Position: Linebacker

Personal information
- Born: April 22, 1996 (age 30); Ponchatoula, Louisiana, U.S.
- Listed height: 6 ft 2 in (1.88 m)
- Listed weight: 250 lb (113 kg)

Career information
- High school: Ponchatoula
- College: Kansas State
- NFL draft: 2020: undrafted

Career history
- Arizona Cardinals (2020–2021); Edmonton Elks (2022)*; Houston Gamblers / Roughnecks (2023–2024)
- * Offseason or practice squad member only

Awards and highlights
- Second-team All-Big 12 (2017); Big 12 Defensive Freshman of the Year (2016)

Career NFL statistics
- Games played: 1
- Stats at Pro Football Reference

Reginald Nigozi Walker (born April 22, 1996) is an American former professional football player who was a linebacker in the National Football League (NFL). He was signed by the Arizona Cardinals as an undrafted free agent in 2020 following his college football career with the Kansas State Wildcats.

== Professional career ==
=== Arizona Cardinals ===
Walker signed with the Arizona Cardinals as an undrafted free agent following the 2020 NFL draft on April 27, 2020. He was waived during final roster cuts on September 5, 2020, and signed to the team's practice squad the next day. He was elevated to the active roster on October 19 for the team's week 6 game against the Dallas Cowboys, and reverted to the practice squad after the game. He was signed to the active roster on November 19, 2020. He was waived on November 21 and re-signed to the practice squad three days later. He signed a reserve/future contract on January 5, 2021. On August 31, 2021, Walker was waived by the Cardinals.

=== Edmonton Elks ===
On May 15, 2022, Walker signed with the Edmonton Elks of the Canadian Football League (CFL). He was placed on the suspended list by the team on May 24, and released on July 29.

=== Houston Gamblers / Roughnecks ===
Walker signed with the Houston Gamblers of the United States Football League (USFL) on September 17, 2022.

Walker and all other Houston Gamblers players and coaches were all transferred to the Houston Roughnecks after it was announced that the Gamblers took on the identity of their XFL counterpart, the Roughnecks. He was placed on injured reserve on March 14, 2024. He was released on October 3, 2024.
