= Toledo Rockets men's basketball statistical leaders =

The Toledo Rockets men's basketball statistical leaders are individual statistical leaders of the Toledo Rockets men's basketball program in various categories, including points, assists, blocks, rebounds, and steals. Within those areas, the lists identify single-game, single-season, and career leaders. The Rockets represent the University of Toledo in the NCAA's Mid-American Conference.

Toledo began competing in intercollegiate basketball in 1915. The NCAA did not officially record assists as a stat until the 1983–84 season, and blocks and steals until the 1985–86 season, but Toledo's record books includes players in these stats before these seasons. These lists are updated through the end of the 2020–21 season.

== Scoring ==
Career
Rk	Player	Points	Seasons
1	Ken Epperson	2,016	1981–82 1982–83 1983–84 1984–85
2	Craig Thames	1,964	1992–93 1993–94 1994–95 1995–96
3	Julius Brown	1,838	2011–12 2012–13 2013–14 2014–15
4	Marreon Jackson	1,817	2017–18 2018–19 2019–20 2020–21
5	Keith Triplett	1,814	2001–02 2002–03 2003–04 2004–05
6	Jaelan Sanford	1,789	2015–16 2016–17 2017–18 2018–19
7	Jonathan Williams	1,757	2013–14 2014–15 2015–16 2016–17
8	Greg Stempin	1,705	1997–98 1998–99 1999–00 2000–01
9	Steve Mix	1,676	1966–67 1967–68 1968–69
10	Rian Pearson	1,589	2011–12 2012–13 2013–14

Season
Rk	Player	Points	Season
1	Craig Thames	699	1995–96
2	Rayj Dennis	683	2022–23
3	Harvey Knuckles	659	1980–81
4	Ryan Rollins	641	2021–22
5	Marreon Jackson	635	2019–20
6	Jonathan Williams	628	2016–17
7	Nathan Boothe	618	2015–16
8	Tom Kozelko	608	1971–72
9	Keith Triplett	607	2003–04
10	Greg Stempin	604	2000–01

Single game
Rk	Player	Points	Season	Opponent
1	Clark Pittenger	49	1918–19	Bluffton
2	Steve Mix	47	1968–69	Butler
3	Clark Pittenger	43	1918–19	Grace Ath. Club
4	Chuck Chuckovits	41	1936–37	Adrian
5	Jim Ray	40	1955–56	Ohio
6	Tom Kozelko	39	1971–72	Western Michigan
	Steve Mix	39	1968–69	Ohio
	Steve Mix	39	1968–69	Detroit
	Jim Ray	39	1955–56	St. Francis
	Jim Ray	39	1954–55	Ohio

== Rebounds ==
Career
Rk	Player	Rebounds	Seasons
1	Ken Epperson	960	1981–82 1982–83 1983–84 1984–85
2	Doug Hess	892	1967–68 1969–70 1970–71
3	Dick Miller	885	1976–77 1977–78 1978–79 1979–80
4	Steve Mix	872	1966–67 1967–68 1968–69
5	Casey Shaw	871	1994–95 1995–96 1996–97 1997–98
6	Mitch Adamek	836	1979–80 1980–81 1981–82 1982–83
	Greg Stempin	836	1997–98 1998–99 1999–00 2000–01
	Luke Knapke	836	2016–17 2017–18 2018–19 2019–20
9	Jim Brown	790	1972–73 1973–74 1974–75
10	Tom Kozelko	779	1970–71 1971–72 1972–73

Season
Rk	Player	Rebounds	Season
1	Steve Taylor Jr.	404	2016–17
2	Willie Jackson	383	2019–20
3	Doug Hess	371	1969–70
4	Jim Brown	349	1973–74
5	Steve Mix	338	1966–67
6	Doug Hess	332	1970–71
7	Bob Aston	316	1965–66
8	Ray Wolford	313	1962–63
9	Bob Aston	301	1964–65
10	Rian Pearson	300	2011–12

Single game
Rk	Player	Rebounds	Season	Opponent
1	Doug Hess	27	1970–71	Marshall
	Ned Miklovic	27	1957–58	Ohio
3	Doug Hess	25	1970–71	Loyola (IL)
	Bob Aston	25	1965–66	Kent State
	Steve Mix	25	1966–67	Northern Illinois
6	Doug Hess	24	1969–70	West Virginia Tech
7	Steve Taylor Jr.	23	2016–17	Western Michigan
	Steve Taylor Jr.	23	2016–17	Youngstown State
	Doug Hess	23	1969–70	Colgate
	Doug Hess	23	1969–70	Kent State

== Assists ==
Career
Rk	Player	Assists	Seasons
1	Tim Reiser	762	1980–81 1981–82 1982–83 1983–84
2	Julius Brown	695	2011–12 2012–13 2013–14 2014–15
3	Marreon Jackson	573	2017–18 2018–19 2019–20 2020–21
4	Keith Wade	560	1987–88 1988–89 1989–90 1990–91
5	Jay Lehman	518	1977–78 1978–79 1979–80 1980–81
6	Stan Joplin	428	1975–76 1976–77 1977–78 1978–79

Season
Rk	Player	Assists	Season
1	Bill Walker	210	1950–51
2	Julius Brown	205	2013–14
3	Rayj Dennis	202	2022–23
4	Keith Wade	199	1990–91
5	Tim Reiser	196	1981–82
	Tim Reiser	196	1980–81

Single game
Rk	Player	Assists	Season	Opponent
1	Tim Reiser	14	1981–82	Kent State
2	Leroy Blyden Jr.	13	2025–26	Buffalo
	Tim Reiser	13	1981–82	Bowling Green
	Tim Reiser	13	1980–81	Ball State
	Jay Lehman	13	1979–80	Florida State
6	Rayj Dennis	12	2022–23	Oakland
	Julius Brown	12	2013–14	Central Michigan
	Julius Brown	12	2012–13	Eastern Michigan
	Tim Reiser	12	1982–83	Kent State
	Stan Joplin	12	1977–78	Ball State
	Stan Joplin	12	1976–77	Bowling Green

== Steals ==
Career
Rk	Player	Steals	Seasons
1	Keith Triplett	278	2001–02 2002–03 2003–04 2004–05
2	Jonathan Amos	242	2005–06 2006–07 2007–08 2008–09
3	Justin Ingram	217	2003–04 2004–05 2005–06 2006–07
4	Craig Thames	207	1992–93 1993–94 1994–95 1995–96
5	Robert Kizer	181	1995–96 1996–97 1997–98 1998–99

Season
Rk	Player	Steals	Season
1	Craig Thames	82	1995–96
2	Keith Triplett	79	2003–04
3	Jonathan Amos	78	2007–08
4	Keith Triplett	76	2004–05
5	Justin Ingram	67	2006–07

Single game
Rk	Player	Steals	Season	Opponent
1	Mynor Strong	7	2026–27	Marshall
	Rian Pearson	7	2011–12	Ball State
	Jonathan Amos	7	2007–08	Kent State
	Gary Campbell	7	1986–87	FIU
	Dick Miller	7	1979–80	Michigan
	Ted Williams	7	1977–78	VMI

== Blocks ==
Career
Rk	Player	Blocks	Seasons
1	Luke Knapke	196	2016–17 2017–18 2018–19 2019–20
2	Nathan Boothe	155	2012–13 2013–14 2014–15 2015–16
3	J.C. Harris	138	1989–90 1990–91 1991–92
4	JT Shumate	117	2020–21 2021–22 2022–23
5	Casey Shaw	112	1994–95 1995–96 1996–97 1997–98
6	A. J. Edu	89	2018–19 2020–21 2021–22 2022–23
7	Craig Sutters	80	1988–89 1989–90 1990–91

Season
Rk	Player	Blocks	Season
1	Luke Knapke	61	2019–20
2	Luke Knapke	60	2017–18
	J.C. Harris	60	1991–92
4	A. J. Edu	57	2018–19
5	Luke Knapke	48	2018–19
6	J.C. Harris	45	1990–91

Single game
Rk	Player	Blocks	Season	Opponent
1	Luke Knapke	10	2019–20	Cleveland State
2	J.C. Harris	9	1991–92	Detroit
3	Barry Sonnenberg	8	1984–85	WMU
4	JT Shumate	7	2021–22	Ohio
	Allen Pinson	7	2004–05	Duke
6	A. J. Edu	6	2018–19	Western Michigan
	Barry Sonnenberg	6	1982–83	Detroit
