= 2020–21 Ohio Bobcats men's basketball team =

American college basketball season

2020–21 Ohio Bobcats men's basketball

MAC tournament champions

NCAA tournament, second round
- Conference: Mid-American Conference
- Record: 17–8 (9–5 MAC)
- Head coach: Jeff Boals (2nd season)
- Assistant coaches: Lamar Thornton (2nd season); Kyle Barlow (2nd season); Lee Martin (1st season)
- Home arena: Convocation Center

2020–21 Mid-American Conference men's basketball standings
	Conf.				Overall
Team	W		L	PCT	W		L	PCT
Toledo	15	–	4	.789	21	–	9	.700
Buffalo	12	–	5	.706	16	–	9	.640
Akron	12	–	6	.667	15	–	8	.652
Kent State	12	–	6	.667	15	–	8	.652
Ohio †	9	–	5	.643	17	–	8	.680
Bowling Green	10	–	8	.556	14	–	12	.538
Miami (OH)	9	–	8	.529	12	–	11	.522
Ball State	8	–	9	.471	10	–	13	.435
Western Michigan	4	–	12	.250	5	–	16	.238
Eastern Michigan	3	–	11	.214	6	–	12	.333
Central Michigan	3	–	13	.188	7	–	16	.304
Northern Illinois	2	–	12	.143	3	–	16	.158
† 2021 MAC tournament winner

The 2020–21 Ohio University Bobcats men's basketball team represented Ohio University for the 2020–21 NCAA Division I men's basketball season. The Bobcats were led by second-year head coach Jeff Boals, who was a 1995 graduate of Ohio University. The team played their home games at the Convocation Center in Athens, Ohio as a member of the Mid-American Conference. In a season limited due to the COVID-19 pandemic, they finished the season 17–8, 9–5 in MAC play to finish in fifth place. As the No. 5 seed in the MAC tournament, they defeated Kent State, Toledo, and Buffalo to win the tournament championship. A a result, they received the conference's automatic bid to the NCAA tournament as the No. 13 seed in the West region. There they upset No. 4-seeded Virginia in the First Round before falling to No. 5-seeded Creighton in the Second Round.

== Previous season ==
The Bobcats finished the 2019–20 season 17–15, 8–10 in MAC play to finish in last place in the East division. As the No. 8 seed in the MAC tournament, they defeated Central Michigan in the first round before the tournament was canceled due to the COVID-19 pandemic.

== Offseason ==
=== Coaching Staff Changes ===
==== Coaching Departures ====
Coaching Departures
Name	Alma Mater	Previous position	New position
Steve Snell		Assistant coach	Director of Basketball Operations (North Carolina State)

==== Coaching Additions ====
Coaching Additions
Name	Alma Mater	Previous position	New position
Lee Martin	Catawba College	Head coach (Hargrave Military Academy)	AssistantCoach

=== Departures ===
Departures
Name	Number	Pos.	Height	Weight	Year	Hometown	Reason
Nate Springs	2	F	6'10"	205	RS Freshman	Charlotte, NC	Transferred to Kennesaw State
Connor Murrell	10	G	6'7"	215	RS Junior	Sioux City, IA	Ended playing career, became graduate assistant
Sylvester Ogbonda	11	F	6'10"	237	Graduate Student	Port Harcourt, Nigeria	Exhausted eligibility
Jordan Dartis	25	G	6'3"	185	RS Senior	Newark, OH	Exhausted eligibility
Marvin Price	44	G	6'5"	210	Freshman	Baltimore, MD	Transferred to Salt Lake Community College

=== Incoming transfers ===
Incoming transfers
Name	Number	Pos.	Height	Weight	Year	Hometown	Reason
Dwight Wilson III	4	F	6'8"	250	Senior	Tallahassee, FL	Transferred from James Madison. Will have one year of eligibility remaining.
Rifen Miguel	23	F	6'8"	240	Junior	Luanda, Angola	Transferred from Tallahassee Community College. Will have two years of eligibility remaining.

=== Recruiting class ===
College recruiting information
Name	Hometown	School	Height	Weight	Commit date
Mark Sears; PG	Muscle Shoals, AL	Hargrave Military Academy	6 ft 1 in (1.85 m)	165 lb (75 kg)	Jul 22, 2020
Mark Sears; PG	Recruit ratings: Scout: Rivals: 247Sports: (74)				
Sam Towns; PF	Winchendon, MA	The Winchendon School	6 ft 9 in (2.06 m)	190 lb (86 kg)	May 16, 2022
Sam Towns; PF	Recruit ratings: Scout: Rivals: 247Sports: (NR)				
Jalen White; SG	Pasadena, TX	Sam Rayburn High School	6 ft 5 in (1.96 m)	180 lb (82 kg)	Jul 18, 2019
Jalen White; SG	Recruit ratings: Scout: Rivals: 247Sports: (NR)				
Colin Granger; PF	Suwanee, Ga.	Lambert High School	6 ft 9 in (2.06 m)	213 lb (97 kg)	Nov 15, 2019
Colin Granger; PF	Recruit ratings: Scout: Rivals: 247Sports: (NR)				
Overall recruit ranking:
Note: In many cases, Scout, Rivals, 247Sports, On3, and ESPN may conflict in their listings of height and weight.; In these cases, the average was taken. ESPN grades are on a 100-point scale.; Sources: "2020 Team Ranking". Rivals.

== Roster ==
2020–21 Ohio Bobcats men's basketball team
Players
Coaches

Pos.	#	Name	Height	Weight	Year	Previous school	Hometown
G	0	Jason Preston	6 ft 4 in (1.93 m)	187 lb (85 kg)	Jr	Believe Sports	Orlando, FL
G	1	Michael Brown, Jr. (W)	5 ft 10 in (1.78 m)	156 lb (71 kg)	So	Northstar Christian	Rochester, NY
G	2	Miles Brown	6 ft 1 in (1.85 m)	180 lb (82 kg)	So	Northstar Christian	Rochester, NY
F	3	Ben Roderick	6 ft 5 in (1.96 m)	205 lb (93 kg)	So	Olentangy Liberty	Powell, OH
F	4	Dwight Wilson III	6 ft 8 in (2.03 m)	250 lb (113 kg)	Sr	Lincoln	Tallahassee, FL
F	5	Ben Vander Plas	6 ft 8 in (2.03 m)	232 lb (105 kg)	RS Jr	Ripon	Ripon, WI
G	10	Mark Sears	6 ft 1 in (1.85 m)	185 lb (84 kg)	Fr	Hargrave	Muscle Shoals, AL
F	11	Sam Towns	6 ft 9 in (2.06 m)	—	Fr	Pickerington Central	Columbus, OH
G	12	John Tenerowicz (W)	6 ft 1 in (1.85 m)	185 lb (84 kg)	Jr	St. Ignatius	Cleveland, OH
G	15	Lunden McDay	6 ft 3 in (1.91 m)	185 lb (84 kg)	So	St. Vincent–St. Mary	Akron, OH
G	21	Jalen White	6 ft 5 in (1.96 m)	180 lb (82 kg)	Fr	Sam Rayburn	Pasadena, TX
C	22	Nolan Foster	6 ft 10 in (2.08 m)	222 lb (101 kg)	So	Mattawan	Mattawan, MI
F	23	Rifen Miguel	6 ft 8 in (2.03 m)	240 lb (109 kg)	Jr	West Oaks	Luanda, Angola
F	24	Mason McMurray	6 ft 7 in (2.01 m)	220 lb (100 kg)	RS So	Stow-Munroe Falls	Stow, OH
F	32	Colin Granger	6 ft 9 in (2.06 m)	230 lb (104 kg)	Fr	Lambert	Suwanee, GA

Head coach

- Jeff Boals (Ohio)

Assistant coach(es)

- Lamar Thornton (Ohio Dominican)
- Kyle Barlow (Concordia–Ann Arbor)
- Lee Martin (Catawba)

Legend

- (C) Team captain
- (S) Suspended
- (I) Ineligible
- (W) Walk-on
- Injured
- Current redshirt

Roster

=== Support Staff ===
2020-21 Ohio Bobcats Support Staff
- Jake Ness - Director of Basketball Operations

== Preseason ==
Prior to the season Ohio was picked second in the MAC preseason poll. Jason Preston was named to the preseason first team all-conference while Ben Vander Plas was on the second team.

=== Preseason rankings ===
MAC preseason poll
Predicted finish	Team	Votes (1st place)
1	Bowling Green	(8) 132
2	Ohio	(1) 117
3	Akron	(2) 115
4	Buffalo	109
5	Ball State	104
6	Toledo	(1) 93
7	Kent State	65
8	Eastern Michigan	57
9	Miami	48
10	Northern Illinois	43
11	Central Michigan	40
12	Western Michigan	13

MAC Tournament Champions: Bowling Green (4), Akron (2), Ball State (1), Buffalo (1), Eastern Michigan (1), Kent State (1), Miami (1), Toledo (1)

=== Preseason All-MAC ===
Preseason All-MAC teams
Team	Player	Position	Year
1st	Jason Preston	G	Jr.
2nd	Ben Vander Plas	F	Jr.

== Schedule and results ==
Ohio had to cancel their games against Mississippi Valley State, Bowling Green, and Kent State due to COVID-19. They also postponed games against Miami (OH), Ball State, Eastern Michigan, Akron, Western Michigan, and Central Michigan.

Date time, TV	Rank^{#}	Opponent^{#}	Result	Record	High points	High rebounds	High assists	Site (attendance) city, state
Non-conference regular season
November 25, 2020*; 5:00 p.m.		vs. Chicago State	W 84–61	1–0	15 – McDay	7 – Wilson III	8 – Preston	State Farm Center (0); Champaign, IL
November 26, 2020*; 3:00 p.m.		vs. North Carolina A&T	W 84–72	2–0	22 – Roderick	9 – Preston	9 – Preston	State Farm Center (0); Champaign, IL
November 27, 2020*; 1:00 p.m., BTN		at No. 8 Illinois	L 75–77	2–1	31 – Preston	8 – Wilson III	8 – Preston	State Farm Center (0); Champaign, IL
December 6, 2020*; 2:00 p.m.		Cleveland State	W 101–46	3–1	20 – McDay	14 – Wilson III	8 – Preston	Convocation Center (0); Athens, OH
December 10, 2020*; 2:00 p.m.		Purdue Northwest	W 92–72	4–1	22 – Preston	13 – Wilson III	11 – Preston	Convocation Center (0); Athens, OH
December 13, 2020*; 2:00 p.m.		at Marshall	L 67–81	4–2	24 – Wilson III	12 – Wilson III	5 – Preston	Henderson Center (1,272); Huntington, WV
December 18, 2020*; Canceled		Mississippi Valley State	Canceled					Convocation Center; Athens, OH
MAC regular season
December 22, 2020; 2:00 p.m.		at Akron	L 70–90	4–3 (0–1)	16 – Preston	7 – Preston	5 – Preston	Rhodes Arena (0); Akron, OH
December 29, 2020; Canceled		at Miami (OH)	Canceled					Millett Hall; Oxford, OH
December 30, 2020; 2:00 p.m.		at Bowling Green	L 75–83	4–4 (0–2)	20 – Wilson III	11 – Vander Plas	9 – Sears	Convocation Center (0); Athens, OH
January 2, 2021; 3:00 p.m., CBSSN		at Ball State	W 78–68	5–4 (1–2)	20 – Roderick	6 – 3 Tied	8 – Sears	Worthen Arena (75); Muncie, Indiana
January 5, 2021; 6:00 p.m., ESPN+		Northern Illinois	W 76–73	6–4 (2–2)	25 – Wilson III	8 – Wilson III	7 – 2 Tied	Convocation Center (0); Athens, OH
January 8, 2021; 6:30 p.m., CBSSN		at Toledo	L 78–95	6–5 (2–3)	20 – Sears	6 – Vander Plas	5 – Sears	Savage Arena (0); Toledo, OH
January 12, 2021; 7:00 p.m.		Miami (OH)	W 78–61	7–5 (3–3)	20 – Roderick	8 – Vander Plas	8 – Preston	Convocation Center (0); Athens, OH
January 16, 2021; 2:00 p.m., ESPN+		Kent State	L 79–89	7–6 (3–4)	24 – Vander Plas	6 – Wilson III	10 – Preston	Convocation Center (0); Athens, OH
January 19, 2021; Canceled		at Northern Illinois	Canceled					Convocation Center; DeKalb, IL
January 22, 2021; Postponed		Ball State	Postponed; rescheduled for January 23					Convocation Center; Athens, OH
January 23, 2021; 1:30 p.m., ESPN3		Ball State	W 85–77	8–6 (4–4)	19 – Sears	10 – Preston	11 – Preston	Convocation Center (0); Athens, OH
January 26, 2021; 6:00 p.m., ESPN+		Western Michigan	W 81–58	9–6 (5–4)	21 – Sears	10 – Preston	6 – Sears	Convocation Center (0); Athens, OH
January 29, 2021; 7:00 p.m., ESPNU		at Buffalo	W 76–75	10–6 (6–4)	21 – Wilson III	9 – Preston	4 – Preston	Alumni Arena (0); Buffalo, NY
February 2, 2021; 5:00 p.m., ESPN3		at Central Michigan	W 83–69	11–6 (7–4)	17 – Preston	11 – Preston	6 – Preston	McGuirk Arena (0); Mt. Pleasant, MI
February 6, 2021; Postponed		Eastern Michigan	Postponed; rescheduled for February 25					Convocation Center; Athens, OH
February 9, 2021; Postponed		Akron	Postponed; rescheduled for February 23					Convocation Center; Athens, OH
February 13, 2021; Canceled		at Western Michigan	Canceled					University Arena; Kalamazoo, MI
February 16, 2021; Canceled		Central Michigan	Canceled					Convocation Center; Athens, OH
February 20, 2021; Canceled		at Bowling Green	Canceled					Stroh Center; Bowling Green, OH
February 23, 2021; 2:00 p.m., ESPN3		Akron	W 90–73	12–6 (8–4)	17 – 2 Tied	9 – Vander Plas	9 – Sears	Convocation Center (0); Athens, OH
February 25, 2021; 2:00 p.m., ESPN3		Eastern Michigan	W 86–67	13–6 (9–4)	17 – Roderick	9 – Preston	12 – Preston	Convocation Center (0); Athens, OH
February 27, 2021; 2:00 p.m., ESPN+		Buffalo	L 66–86	13–7 (9–5)	15 – Roderick	6 – Vander Plas	6 – 2 Tied	Convocation Center (0); Athens, OH
March 2, 2021; Canceled		Kent State	Canceled					MAC Center; Kent, OH
March 5, 2021; Canceled		Bowling Green	Canceled					Convocation Center; Athens, OH
MAC tournament
March 11, 2021; 1:55 P.M., ESPN+	(5)	vs. (4) Kent State; Quarterfinals	W 85–63	14–7	19 – Preston	9 – Wilson III	4 – Preston	Rocket Mortgage FieldHouse (0); Cleveland, OH
March 12, 2021; 5:00 P.M., CBSSN	(5)	vs. (1) Toledo; Semifinals	W 87–80	15–7	27 – Preston	12 – Wilson III	7 – Vander Plas	Rocket Mortgage FieldHouse (0); Cleveland, OH
March 13, 2021; 7:30 p.m., ESPN2	(5)	vs. (2) Buffalo; Championship	W 84–69	16–7	22 – Preston	7 – Wilson III	7 – Preston	Rocket Mortgage FieldHouse (0); Cleveland, OH
NCAA tournament
March 20, 2021; 7:15 P.M., truTV	(13 W)	vs. (4 W) No. 15 Virginia; First Round	W 62–58	17–7	17 – Vander Plas	13 – Preston	8 – Preston	Simon Skjodt Assembly Hall; Bloomington, IN
March 22, 2021; 6:10 P.M., TNT	(13 W)	vs. (5 W) No. 19 Creighton; Second Round	L 58–72	17–8	12 – Wilson III	10 – Vander Plas	7 – Preston	Hinkle Fieldhouse; Indianapolis, IN
*Non-conference game. ^{#}Rankings from AP Poll. (#) Tournament seedings in parentheses. W=West. All times are in Eastern Time.

== Statistics ==
=== Team statistics ===
Final 2020–21 statistics

Record	Ohio	OPP
Scoring	1980	1815
Scoring Average	79.20	72.60
Field goals – Att	728–1519	646–1468
3-pt. Field goals – Att	209–593	197–583
Free throws – Att	315–448	326–429
Rebounds	883	840
Assists	437	345
Turnovers	301	344
Steals	161	141
Blocked Shots	52	65

=== Player statistics ===
			Minutes		Scoring		Total FGs			3-point FGs			Free-Throws			Rebounds								
Player	GP	GS	Tot	Avg	Pts	Avg	FG	FGA	Pct	3FG	3FA	Pct	FT	FTA	Pct	Off	Def	Tot	Avg	A	PF	TO	Stl	Blk
Dwight Wilson	24	23	656	27.3	347	14.5	150	229	0.655	0	2	0	47	70	0.671	65	116	181	7.5	16	44	40	13	9
Ben Vander Plas	25	25	846	33.8	321	12.8	114	263	0.433	51	146	0.349	42	55	0.764	19	126	145	5.8	94	60	58	36	15
Jason Preston	20	20	691	34.6	314	15.7	127	247	0.514	32	82	0.39	28	47	0.596	21	124	145	7.3	145	27	60	29	5
Ben Roderick	23	22	608	26.4	285	12.4	105	221	0.475	55	139	0.396	20	30	0.667	14	56	70	3	19	51	25	14	4
Lunden McDay	25	25	741	29.6	255	10.2	86	208	0.413	28	84	0.333	55	69	0.797	31	27	58	2.3	32	43	23	17	5
Mark Sears	24	5	468	19.5	203	8.5	64	137	0.467	12	43	0.279	63	74	0.851	19	47	66	2.8	81	35	29	24	1
Miles Brown	25	1	442	17.7	114	4.6	34	82	0.415	17	48	0.354	29	45	0.644	4	34	38	1.5	30	28	18	18	7
Rifen Miguel	13	0	95	7.3	38	2.9	12	35	0.343	3	12	0.25	11	15	0.733	9	12	21	1.6	0	28	13	3	2
Jalen White	11	0	65	5.9	30	2.7	11	25	0.44	6	13	0.462	2	3	0.667	4	7	11	1	3	6	2	1	1
Colin Granger	22	2	134	6.1	29	1.3	12	29	0.414	0	1	0	5	10	0.5	14	13	27	1.2	3	38	10	2	0
Sam Towns	15	2	120	8	21	1.4	7	26	0.269	2	16	0.125	5	14	0.357	4	16	20	1.3	6	14	2	3	3
Mason McMurray	19	0	86	4.5	18	0.9	5	12	0.417	3	7	0.429	5	9	0.556	7	13	20	1.1	7	12	3	1	0
Nolan Foster	6	0	27	4.5	2	0.3	1	2	0.5	0	0	0	0	1	0	2	1	3	0.5	0	7	2	0	0
John Tenerowicz	5	0	11	2.2	2	0.4	0	2	0	0	0	0	2	2	1	1	0	1	0.2	1	1	1	0	0
Michael Brown	5	0	10	2	1	0.2	0	1	0	0	0	0	1	4	0.25	0	0	0	0	0	2	0	0	0
Total	25	-	5000	-	1980	79.2	728	1519	0.479	209	593	0.352	315	448	0.703	240	643	883	35.3	437	396	301	161	52
Opponents	25	-	5000	-	1815	72.6	646	1468	0.440	197	583	0.338	326	429	0.760	228	612	840	33.6	345	441	344	141	65

Legend
GP	Games played	GS	Games started	Avg	Average per game
FG	Field-goals made	FGA	Field-goal attempts	Off	Offensive rebounds
Def	Defensive rebounds	A	Assists	TO	Turnovers
Blk	Blocks	Stl	Steals	High	Team high

== Awards and honors ==
=== Weekly Awards ===
Weekly Award Honors
Honors	Player	Position	Date Awarded	Source
MAC player of the week	Jason Preston	G	November 30	

=== Final awards watchlists ===
Final award honors watchlist
Honors	Player	Position	Year	Source
Lou Henson National Player of the Year	Jason Preston	G	Jr.	

=== All-MAC Awards ===
Postseason All-MAC teams
Award	Player	Position	Year
MAC 1st team	Jason Preston	G	Jr.
MAC 3rd Team	Ben Vander Plas	F	Jr.
MAC 3rd team	Dwight Wilson III	F	Sr.
MAC Freshman Team	Mark Sears	F	Fr.
MAC Defensive Team	Lunden McDay	G	So.

=== National Awards ===
National Award Honors
Honors	Player	Position	Ref.
Academic All-American	Ben Vander Plas	F	
