= Justin Ingram =

Justin Ingram may refer to:

- Justin Ingram (soccer), American soccer player
- Justin Ingram (basketball), American basketball player
