= 2020–21 Toledo Rockets men's basketball team =

American college basketball season

2020–21 Toledo Rockets men's basketball

MAC regular season champions

NIT, First Round
- Conference: Mid-American Conference
- West Division
- Record: 21–9 (15–4 MAC)
- Head coach: Tod Kowalczyk (11th season)
- Assistant coaches: Jeff Massey; Walter Offutt; Justin Ingram
- Home arena: Savage Arena

2020–21 Mid-American Conference men's basketball standings
| | Conf. | | | | Overall |
| Team | W | | L | PCT | W | | L | PCT |
|---|---|---|---|---|---|---|---|---|
| Toledo | 15 | – | 4 | .789 | 21 | – | 9 | .700 |
| Buffalo | 12 | – | 5 | .706 | 16 | – | 9 | .640 |
| Akron | 12 | – | 6 | .667 | 15 | – | 8 | .652 |
| Kent State | 12 | – | 6 | .667 | 15 | – | 8 | .652 |
| Ohio † | 9 | – | 5 | .643 | 17 | – | 8 | .680 |
| Bowling Green | 10 | – | 8 | .556 | 14 | – | 12 | .538 |
| Miami (OH) | 9 | – | 8 | .529 | 12 | – | 11 | .522 |
| Ball State | 8 | – | 9 | .471 | 10 | – | 13 | .435 |
| Western Michigan | 4 | – | 12 | .250 | 5 | – | 16 | .238 |
| Eastern Michigan | 3 | – | 11 | .214 | 6 | – | 12 | .333 |
| Central Michigan | 3 | – | 13 | .188 | 7 | – | 16 | .304 |
| Northern Illinois | 2 | – | 12 | .143 | 3 | – | 16 | .158 |
† 2021 MAC tournament winner

The 2020–21 Toledo Rockets men's basketball team represented the University of Toledo during the 2020–21 NCAA Division I men's basketball season. The Rockets, led by 11th-year head coach Tod Kowalczyk, played their home games at Savage Arena, as members of the West Division of the Mid-American Conference. In a season limited due to the ongoing COVID-19 pandemic, the Rockets finished the season 21–9, 15–4 in MAC play to win MAC regular season championship. They defeated Ball State in the first round of the MAC tournament before losing to eventual tournament champions Ohio in the second round. They received an at-large bid to the National Invitation Tournament, where they lost to Richmond in the first round.

== Previous season ==
The Rockets finished the 2019–20 season 17–15, 8–10 in MAC play to finish in third place in the West division. They defeated Western Michigan in the first round of the MAC tournament, before the tournament and all subsequent postseason tournaments were canceled due to the COVID-19 pandemic.

== Offseason ==
=== Departures ===
| Name | Number | Pos. | Height | Weight | Year | Hometown | Reason for departure |
|---|---|---|---|---|---|---|---|
| Gavin Bizeau | 0 | F | 6'11" | 210 | Sophomore | Plainfield, IN | Transferred to Marian University |
| T. J. Smith | 1 | F | 6'8" | 195 | Freshman | Matteson, IL | Transferred to Barry |
| Aaron Etherington | 2 | F | 6'6" | 215 | Freshman | Fishers, IN | Transferred to Indianapolis |
| Donavan Moore | 5 | G | 6'3" | 175 | Freshman | Hillsboro, IL | Transferred to Green Bay |
| Dylan Alderson | 21 | G | 6'5" | 205 | Junior | Clarkston, MI | Transferred to Indiana Wesleyan |
| Willie Jackson | 23 | F | 6'6" | 215 | Senior | Cleveland, OH | Graduated |
| Luke Knapke | 30 | C | 6'11" | 245 | Senior | Maria Stein, OH | Graduated |

=== 2020 recruiting class ===
College recruiting
| Name | Hometown | School | Height | Weight | Commit date |
|---|---|---|---|---|---|
| Ryan Rollins #85 SG | Macomb, MI | Dakota | 6 ft 4 in (1.93 m) | 175 lb (79 kg) | Nov 13, 2019 |
| Ryan Rollins #85 SG | Recruit ratings: Rivals: 247Sports: | | | | |
| Jamere Hill; SG | Joliet, IL | Joliet West | 6 ft 3 in (1.91 m) | 175 lb (79 kg) | Jan 11, 2020 |
| Jamere Hill; SG | Recruit ratings: No ratings found | | | | |
| Ra'Heim Moss; SG | Springfield, OH | SPIRE Academy | 6 ft 4 in (1.93 m) | 205 lb (93 kg) | Nov 30, 2019 |
| Ra'Heim Moss; SG | Recruit ratings: No ratings found | | | | |
Overall recruit ranking:
Note: In many cases, Scout, Rivals, 247Sports, On3, and ESPN may conflict in their listings of height and weight.; In these cases, the average was taken. ESPN grades are on a 100-point scale.; Sources: "2020 Team Ranking". Rivals.

=== Incoming transfers ===
| Name | Number | Pos. | Height | Weight | Year | Hometown | Notes |
|---|---|---|---|---|---|---|---|
| Setric Millner Jr. | 2 | F | 6'6" | 205 | Junior | Little Rock, AR | Transferred from Northwest Florida State College. Had two years of remaining eligibility. |
| JT Shumate | 32 | F | 6'7" | 210 | Junior | Newark, OH | Transferred from Walsh University. Had two years of remaining eligibility. |
| Jonathan Komagum | 35 | F/C | 6'9" | 215 | Junior | London, England | Transferred from Williston State College. Had two years of remaining eligibility. |

== Roster ==
2020–21 Toledo Rockets men's basketball team
Players
Coaches

| Pos. | # | Name | Height | Weight | Year | Previous school | Hometown |
|---|---|---|---|---|---|---|---|
| G | 0 | Ra'Heim Moss | 6 ft 4 in (1.93 m) | 205 lb (93 kg) | Fr | SPIRE Academy | Springfield, OH |
| G | 1 | Jamere Hill | 6 ft 3 in (1.91 m) | 175 lb (79 kg) | Fr | Joliet West | Joliet, IL |
| F | 2 | Setric Millner Jr. | 6 ft 6 in (1.98 m) | 205 lb (93 kg) | Jr | Northwest Florida State College | Little Rock, AR |
| G | 3 | Marreon Jackson | 6 ft 1 in (1.85 m) | 200 lb (91 kg) | Sr | Garfield Heights | Cleveland, OH |
| F | 4 | Mattia Acunzo | 6 ft 8 in (2.03 m) | 225 lb (102 kg) | RS Fr | Kennedy Catholic | Sardinia, Italy |
| G | 5 | Ryan Rollins | 6 ft 4 in (1.93 m) | 180 lb (82 kg) | Fr | Dakota | Macomb, MI |
| G | 11 | Spencer Littleson | 6 ft 4 in (1.93 m) | 200 lb (91 kg) | Sr | Rochester Adams; Duquesne | Rochester Hills, MI |
| F | 12 | Luke Maranka | 6 ft 10 in (2.08 m) | 225 lb (102 kg) | So | Grand Rapids Angels Homeschool | Ada, MI |
| F/C | 15 | A. J. Edu (injured) | 6 ft 10 in (2.08 m) | 225 lb (102 kg) | RS So | South Gloucestershire and Stroud College | Colchester, England |
| G | 22 | Blake Williams (W) | 6 ft 0 in (1.83 m) | 195 lb (88 kg) | Sr | St. John's Jesuit | Holland, OH |
| G | 24 | Keshaun Saunders | 6 ft 5 in (1.96 m) | 190 lb (86 kg) | RS So | Orangeville Prep | Brampton, ON |
| F | 32 | JT Shumate | 6 ft 7 in (2.01 m) | 210 lb (95 kg) | Jr | Newark; Walsh University | Newark, OH |
| F/C | 35 | Jonathan Komagum | 6 ft 9 in (2.06 m) | 215 lb (98 kg) | Jr | Williston State College | London, England |

Head coach

- Tod Kowalczyk (Minnesota Duluth)

Assistant coach(es)

- Jeff Massey (Xavier)
- Walter Offutt (Ohio)
- Justin Ingram (Toledo)

Legend

- (C) Team captain
- (S) Suspended
- (I) Ineligible
- (W) Walk-on
- Injured
- Current redshirt

Roster

== Schedule and results ==
| Date time, TV | Rank^{#} | Opponent^{#} | Result | Record | High points | High rebounds | High assists | Site (attendance) city, state |
Non-conference regular season
| November 25, 2020*; 3:15 p.m. | | vs. Bradley; Xavier Invitational | L 59–61 | 0–1 | 17 – Millner Jr. | 7 – Komagum | 4 – Jackson | Cintas Center (111); Cincinnati, OH |
| November 26, 2020*; 3:15 p.m. | | vs. Oakland; Xavier Invitational | W 80–53 | 1–1 | 24 – Littleson | 9 – Millner Jr. | 8 – Jackson | Cintas Center (36); Cincinnati, OH |
| November 27, 2020*; 12:00 p.m., FS1 | | at Xavier; Xavier Invitational | L 73–76 | 1–2 | 20 – Rollins | 15 – Millner Jr. | 6 – Jackson | Cintas Center (300); Cincinnati, OH |
| December 1, 2020*; 7:00 p.m., ESPN3 | | Cleveland State | W 70–61 | 2–2 | 17 – Millner Jr. | 11 – Komagum | 5 – Jackson | Savage Arena (0); Toledo, OH |
| December 4, 2020; 7:00 p.m., ESPN3 | | at Eastern Michigan | W 91–74 | 3–2 (1–0) | 20 – Jackson | 7 – Saunders | 5 – Jackson | Convocation Center (0); Ypsilanti, MI |
| December 9, 2020; 7:00 p.m., FS1 | | at No. 19 Michigan | L 71–91 | 3–3 | 14 – Millner Jr. | 6 – Millner Jr. | 4 – Rollins | Crisler Center (0); Ann Arbor, MI |
| December 12, 2020*; ESPN3 | | Kansas City | W 64–57 | 4–3 | 17 – Millner Jr. | 10 – Millner Jr. | 3 – Millner Jr. | Savage Arena (0); Toledo, OH |
| December 16, 2020*; 6:00 p.m., C-USA TV | | at Marshall | W 96–87 ^{OT} | 5–3 | 23 – Jackson | 13 – Rollins | 8 – Jackson | Cam Henderson Center (1,222); Huntington, WV |
| December 19, 2020*; 2:00 p.m. | | Valparaiso | W 71–55 | 6–3 | 18 – Jackson | 8 – Littleson | 5 – Jackson | Savage Arena (0); Toledo, OH |
MAC regular season
| December 22, 2020; 2:00 p.m., ESPN3 | | Northern Illinois | W 78–55 | 7–3 (2–0) | 18 – Littleson | 11 – Rollins | 6 – Millner Jr. | Savage Arena (0); Toledo, OH |
| January 2, 2021; 2:00 p.m., ESPN3 | | at Western Michigan | W 70–59 | 8–3 (3–0) | 20 – Rollins | 9 – Shumate | 4 – Jackson | University Arena (0); Kalamazoo, MI |
| January 5, 2021; 6:00 p.m., ESPN3 | | at Kent State | W 84–82 | 9–3 (4–0) | 26 – Littleson | 6 – Rollins | 5 – Jackson | Memorial Athletic and Convocation Center (0); Kent, OH |
| January 8, 2021; 6:30 p.m., CBSSN | | Ohio | W 95–78 | 10–3 (5–0) | 18 – Jackson | 7 – Millner Jr. | 6 – Jackson | Savage Arena (0); Toledo, OH |
| January 12, 2021; 7:00 p.m., ESPN3 | | Eastern Michigan | W 96–63 | 11–3 (6–0) | 20 – Saunders | 7 – Millner Jr. | 5 – Jackson | Savage Arena (0); Toledo, OH |
| January 16, 2021; 2:00 p.m., ESPN3 | | at Akron | L 94–95 ^{OT} | 11–4 (6–1) | 24 – Jackson | 9 – Jackson | 10 – Jackson | Rhodes Arena (0); Akron, OH |
| January 19, 2021; 7:00 p.m., ESPN+ | | Central Michigan | W 89–72 | 12–4 (7–1) | 25 – Rollins | 7 – Rollins | 9 – Jackson | Savage Arena (0); Toledo, OH |
| January 23, 2021; 12:00 p.m., ESPN3 | | Kent State | W 76–74 | 13–4 (8–1) | 31 – Jackson | 6 – Millner Jr. | 5 – Jackson | Savage Arena (0); Toledo, OH |
| January 26, 2021; 7:00 p.m., ESPN+ | | at Miami (OH) | W 90–81 | 14–4 (9–1) | 33 – Shumate | 5 – Rollins | 6 – Rollins | Millett Hall (0); Oxford, OH |
| January 30, 2021; 5:00 p.m., ESPN+ | | at Bowling Green | W 84–66 | 15–4 (10–1) | 19 – Littleson | 12 – Jackson | 7 – Jackson | Stroh Center (0); Bowling Green, OH |
| February 2, 2021; 7:00 p.m., ESPN+ | | Akron | W 91–76 | 16–4 (11–1) | 25 – Shumate | 11 – Jackson | 8 – Jackson | Savage Arena (0); Toledo, OH |
| February 6, 2021; 12:00 p.m., CBSSN | | at Ball State | L 67–81 | 16–5 (11–2) | 13 – Shumate | 8 – Millner Jr. | 4 – Jackson | Worthen Arena (0); Muncie, IN |
| February 9, 2021; 3:00 p.m., ESPN+ | | at Northern Illinois | Postponed due to COVID-19 | | | | | Convocation Center (-); DeKalb, IL |
| February 13, 2021; 2:00 p.m., ESPN3 | | Bowling Green | L 81–88 | 16–6 (11–3) | 27 – Jackson | 14 – Jackson | 8 – Jackson | Savage Arena (0); Toledo, OH |
| February 16, 2021; 7:00 p.m., ESPN3 | | Miami (OH) | W 87–75 | 17–6 (12–3) | 25 – Littleson | 10 – Jackson | 11 – Jackson | Savage Arena (0); Toledo, OH |
| February 19, 2021; 9:00 p.m., ESPN2 | | at Buffalo | W 80–70 | 18–6 (13–3) | 20 – Jackson | 7 – Millner Jr. | 6 – Jackson | Alumni Arena (0); Amherst, NY |
| February 27, 2021; 5:00 p.m., ESPN3 | | Western Michigan | W 91–44 | 19–6 (14–3) | 22 – Jackson | 10 – Millner Jr | 8 – Jackson | Savage Arena (0); Toledo, OH |
| March 2, 2021; 5:00 p.m., ESPN+ | | at Central Michigan | L 79–81 | 19–7 (14–4) | 17 – Rollins | 14 – Jackson | 4 – Jackson | McGuirk Arena (0); Mount Pleasant, MI |
| March 5, 2021; 7:00 p.m., CBSSN | | Ball State | W 89–70 | 20–7 (15–4) | 22 – Jackson | 13 – Jackson | 10 – Jackson | Savage Arena (0); Toledo, OH |
MAC tournament
| Mar 11, 2021; 11:00 a.m., ESPN+ | (1) | vs. (8) Ball State; Quarterfinals | W 91–89 ^{OT} | 21–7 | 29 – Jackson | 12 – Millner Jr. | 4 – Jackson | Rocket Mortgage FieldHouse (0); Cleveland, OH |
| Mar 12, 2021; 5:00 p.m., CBSSN | (1) | vs. (5) Ohio; Semifinals | L 80–87 | 21–8 | 29 – Jackson | 10 – Littleson | 2 – Jackson | Rocket Mortgage FieldHouse (0); Cleveland, OH |
NIT
| Mar 17, 2021; 7:00 p.m., ESPN2 | (3) | vs. (2) Richmond; First Round – Saint Louis bracket | L 66–76 | 21–9 | 18 – Rollins | 6 – Millner Jr. | 4 – Millner Jr. | UNT Coliseum (731); Denton, TX |
*Non-conference game. ^{#}Rankings from AP Poll. (#) Tournament seedings in parentheses. All times are in Central Time.
