= Colin Granger =

American football player

Profile
- Position: Tight end

Personal information
- Born: 2001 or 2002
- Listed height: 6 ft 9 in (2.06 m)
- Listed weight: 235 lb (107 kg)

Career information
- High school: Lambert (Suwanee, Georgia)
- College: Ohio (2020–2022); Western Carolina (2022–2024); Coastal Carolina (2024–2025)
- NFL draft: 2025: undrafted

Career history
- Carolina Panthers (2025)*
- * Offseason or practice squad member only

Colin Granger (born 2001 or 2002) is an American professional football tight end. He previously played college basketball for the Ohio Bobcats, Western Carolina Catamounts and the Coastal Carolina Chanticleers.

== Early life ==
Coming out of high school, Granger committed to play college basketball for the Ohio Bobcats over other schools including Mount St. Mary's.

== College career ==
=== Ohio ===
During his time with the Bobcats from 2020 to 2022, Granger appeared in 25 games with two starts, averaging 1.2 points and 1.2 rebounds per game. After the 2021–22 season, he entered his name into the NCAA transfer portal.

=== Western Carolina ===
Granger transferred to play for the Western Carolina Catamounts, where, in 2022–23, he appeared in 33 games with five starts and averaged 2.6 points and 2.2 rebounds per game. During the 2023–24 season, Granger averaged 2.4 points and 2.7 rebounds in 31 games. After the season, Granger once again entered the NCAA transfer portal.

=== Coastal Carolina ===
Granger transferred to play for the Coastal Carolina Chanticleers. In the first round of the 2025 Sun Belt tournament, he put up 19 points in a loss to Southern Miss. During the 2024–25 season, Granger averaged 7.2 points and 4.4 rebounds in 31 games.

== Professional football career ==
On April 7, 2025, Granger signed to play football with the Carolina Panthers as a tight end. On May 8, Granger was waived with an injury settlement, due to a hamstring injury.
