= Hargrave Military Academy basketball =

Prep basketball team

Hargrave Military Academy Tigers
- University: Hargrave Military Academy
- First season: 1990-91
- Location: Chatham, VA
- Arena: Walter Davis Gymnasium (capacity: 1,382)
- Nickname: Tigers

Uniforms
Home	Away

The Hargrave Military Academy basketball team is the prep basketball team of Hargrave Military Academy. The Tigers have won three National Prep Championships since a formal tournament began in the mid 2000s. The program has produced hundreds of players that went on to play NCAA Division I basketball, and 31 that have gone on to play in the NBA. The program has also been a breeding ground for college coaches, as many former head coaches and assistants have ascended through the ranks at the NCAA Division I level. The Hargrave Military Academy basketball program was named “Program of the Decade” by RealGM in 2012 after a study showing that Hargrave produced more successful college basketball players than any other prep school or high school in the nation. The program was also featured on a season 2 episode of CNN's Inside Man.

== Team history ==
=== The Scott Shepard years (94-99) ===
Shepard manned the sidelines for the Tigers from the 1994-95 season to the 1998–99 season. He compiled an overall record of 127-18, and had multiple teams ranked in the top 3 nationally. He sent over fifty players on to Division 1 schools in his time. Shepard moved on from Hargrave to accept a position as an assistant coach with the Virginia Cavaliers for the 1999-2000 season.

=== The Kevin Keatts years (99-01;03-11) ===
Upon Shepherd's departure to the University of Virginia, Kevin Keatts was promoted from an assistant to head coach prior to the 1999-2000 season. Keatts would man the sidelines for the Tigers for the 99-00 and 00-01 seasons before accepting an assistant coaching position at Marshall. He returned to Hargrave for the 2003-2004 season, and was in charge of the Tigers for the better part of the decade from that point forward. He coached the Tigers to their first two National Prep Championships, as well as the program's first undefeated season in 2008. During his time, he sent 103 players on to the NCAA Division I level, and coached 16 players that reached the NBA level. He owns a career win-loss record at Hargrave of 262-17. Keatts would leave Hargrave in 2011 to accept a position as an assistant coach on Rick Pitino's Louisville staff.

=== The A.W. Hamilton years (11-17) ===
A longtime assistant to Kevin Keatts, A.W. Hamilton was selected to lead the program when Keatts departed. Hamilton presided over the Tigers during one of the most successful stretches in the history of the program. His 6-year run included 237 wins with just 22 losses, with 63 of his players continuing on to the NCAA Division I level. He also had two former players, and fellow Hargrave All-Decade Team selections, Montrezl Harrell and Terry Rozier, selected in the 2015 NBA Draft. Hamilton was lauded as the National Prep Coach of the Year twice (2012,2016) and East Regional Coach of the Year three times (2014, 2015, 2017) during his tenure. He guided players that set records for career points and points scored in a game and his 2016 National Championship team set a school record for wins in a season with 47. Hamilton had a home record of 120-2 during his six years at the helm. Hamilton accepted a position as an assistant coach at N.C. State, reuniting with Kevin Keatts, in 2017.

=== The Lee Martin years (17-20) ===
Lee Martin had been the associate head coach for A.W. Hamilton from 2015-2017 and was hired as his replacement when the former departed for N.C. State. Martin continued the winning tradition at Hargrave, to the tune of a 113-12 overall record in his three seasons as head coach. Martin's teams advanced to the National Tournament every year of his tenure, including an Elite 8 appearance in 2019 and a Final Four appearance in 2020. Under his watch, Hargrave broke the school record for points in a single game with 173 points scored on March 1, 2019. Martin's teams finished in the top 4 of the final national poll each year of his tenure. In his three years as Head Coach, 26 of his players went on to the Division 1 level. On June 25, 2020, Martin accepted a position as an assistant coach on Jeff Boals' staff at Ohio.

=== The Thomas Messinger years (20-23) ===
Thomas Messinger was hired as head coach in June 2020 after a 3-year stint as the associate head coach for Lee Martin. Messinger served as an assistant coach under Hamilton (15-17) before that. As an assistant at Hargrave, his record was 203-15. Messinger led the Tigers to a 33-1 record in his first year at the helm during the 2020-2021 season, and a 37-5 record in his second year during the 2021-22 season. Both seasons saw the Tigers end the season ranked in the top 4 nationally (#2 in 2021, #4 in 2022). Messinger was named South Region Coach of the Year for the 2021-22 season. Over his first two seasons, 18 players from Hargrave signed NCAA Division I scholarships. In his third season, Hargrave ended the season ranked #1 nationally with a 44-2 overall record, which included winning the inaugural Elite Prep League regular season and conference championships. Messinger also became the fastest coach to 100 career wins in Hargrave's storied history (106 games, during his third season) on January 28, 2023. Messinger was named National Postgrad Coach of the Year, as well as Elite Prep League Coach of the Year for the 2022-23 season. His overall record as head coach stands at 114-8 (.934 winning percentage) through three seasons. In May 2023, Messinger accepted a position as an Assistant Coach at NJIT under Grant Billmeier.

== Current roster ==
2025–26 Hargrave Military Academy Tigers men's basketball team
Players
Coaches

Pos.	#	Name	Height	Weight	Year	Previous school	Hometown
G	0	LJ Holman	6 ft 2 in (1.88 m)	—	Jr	Great Crossing High School	Lexington, Kentucky
F	1	Myles Sidney	6 ft 6 in (1.98 m)	—		Lipscomb Academy	Old Hickory, Tennessee
G	2	Jordan Hunter	6 ft 3 in (1.91 m)	—	Jr	Paul VI	Fairfax, Virginia
G	3	Damon Phillips	6 ft 0 in (1.83 m)	—		Cardinal Gibbons	Raleigh, North Carolina
F	4	Reed Kirtner	6 ft 3 in (1.91 m)	—		George Wythe High School	Wytheville, Virginia
F	5	Shane Pendergrass	6 ft 9 in (2.06 m)	—	Sr	Mt. Zion Prep	Upper Marlboro, Maryland
F	11	Andrew Maria	6 ft 6 in (1.98 m)	—	Sr	Bethe1 Academy	Arlington, Virginia
G	12	Prodigy Simms	5 ft 10 in (1.78 m)	—		Eastern Mennonite School	Staunton, Virginia
G	13	Chase James	6 ft 3 in (1.91 m)	—		Glen Allen High School	Richmond, Virginia
G	14	JJ Sullivan	6 ft 3 in (1.91 m)	—	Sr	Iowa United Prep	St. Paul, Minnesota
G	15	Jhett Carter	6 ft 5 in (1.96 m)	—	Jr	Astronaut High School	Titusville, Florida
G	21	Drew Royal	6 ft 2 in (1.88 m)	—		Auburn High School	Riner, Virginia
F	22	Jameer Reynolds	6 ft 6 in (1.98 m)	—		Dan River High School	Martinsville, Virginia
G	23	Belgude Choijilsuren	6 ft 3 in (1.91 m)	—	Sr	Fairfax High School	Centreville, Virginia
G	24	Kadin Burnard	6 ft 4 in (1.93 m)	—	Sr	Tilton School	Fredericksburg, Virginia
C	33	Alek Kornacki	6 ft 11 in (2.11 m)	—		Concord Academy	Warsaw, POLAND
C	35	Yaw Ansong	7 ft 0 in (2.13 m)	—		Union Catholic	South Plainfield, New Jersey

Head coach

- Ben Veshi (Catawba)

Assistant coach(es)

- Jonathan Mebane (Charlotte)
- Luke Rosinski (New Hampshire)
- Dave Bentley (Anderson (SC))

Legend

- (C) Team captain
- (S) Suspended
- (I) Ineligible
- (W) Walk-on
- Injured
- Current redshirt

== Notable players and coaches ==
=== McDonald's All-Americans ===
Name	Year
Korleone Young	1998
James White	2001
Vernon Macklin	2006
PJ Hairston	2011

=== Postgraduate All-Americans ===
Name	Year	Team
Keon Thompson	2022	Second Team
Elijah Gray	2022	Third Team
Leland Walker	2022	Honorable Mention
Jaden Daughtry	2023	First Team
Kailon Nicholls	2023	Second Team
Diovion Famakinde	2023	Third Team
De'Shayne Montgomery	2023	Honorable Mention
Shane Pendergrass	2025	Third Team

=== Hargrave All-Decade teams ===
Name	Decade
Josh Howard	1990’s
David West	1990’s
Lonny Baxter	1990’s
James Thomas	1990’s
Korleone Young	1990’s
Coach Scott Shepherd	1990’s
Joe Alexander	2000’s
James White	2000’s
Mike Scott	2000’s
Vernon Macklin	2000’s
Marreese Speights	2000’s
Coach Kevin Keatts	2000’s
Braxton Beverly	2010’s
Naji Marshall	2010’s
PJ Hairston	2010’s
Terry Rozier	2010’s
Montrezl Harrell	2010’s
Coach A.W. Hamilton	2010’s

=== Hargrave Basketball Hall of Fame ===
Year	Player(s)	Inducted as
2011	Kevin Keatts	Coach
2011	Josh Howard	Player
2011	David West	Player
2012	Joe Alexander	Player
2013	Mike Gallagher	Player
2014	Mike Scott	Player
2015	Jake Ness	Player
2015	Luke Hancock	Player
2016	Hy Cook	Contributor
2017	A.W. Hamilton	Player/Coach
2018	Marreese Speights	Player
2021	Lee Martin	Player/Coach
2022	Braxton Beverly	Player

=== Members who moved to the NBA ===
- Korleone Young ‘98, Detroit Pistons
- Lonny Baxter ‘98, Chicago Bulls
- Anthony Grundy ‘98, Atlanta Hawks
- David West ‘99, Golden State Warriors
- Josh Howard ‘99, Dallas Mavericks
- James Thomas ‘00, Philadelphia 76ers
- Tony Bobbitt ‘00, Los Angeles Lakers
- Brian Chase ‘00, Los Angeles Lakers
- James White ‘01, New York Knicks
- Sharrod Ford ‘01, Phoenix Suns
- Joe Alexander ‘05, Milwaukee Bucks
- Sam Young ‘05, Indiana Pacers
- Marreese Speights ‘06, Orlando Magic
- Vernon Macklin ’06, Detroit Pistons
- Jordan Crawford ‘07, Boston Celtics
- Mike Scott ‘07, Atlanta Hawks
- Dee Bost ‘08, Portland Trail Blazers
- Luke Hancock ‘09, Memphis Grizzlies
- Lorenzo Brown ‘10, Toronto Raptors
- PJ Hairston ‘11, Charlotte Hornets
- Dez Wells ‘11, Washington Wizards
- Montrezl Harrell ‘12, Los Angeles Clippers
- Terry Rozier ‘13, Miami Heat
- Donte Grantham ‘14, Los Angeles Clippers
- Jon Davis ‘15, Orlando Magic
- Hassani Gravett ’15, Orlando Magic
- Naji Marshall '17, Dallas Mavericks
- Mark Sears '20, Milwaukee Bucks
- Miles Kelly '21, Dallas Mavericks

=== Other notable alumni ===
- Larry Brown, former head coach of the Charlotte Bobcats, New York Knicks, Detroit Pistons, Philadelphia 76ers, Indiana Pacers, Los Angeles Clippers, San Antonio Spurs, New Jersey Nets, Denver Nuggets
- Shannon Evans, former player for Arizona State and Buffalo and current professional player for Atomerőmű SE
- Kęstutis Marčiulionis, former player for Delaware who most recently played professionally with Volukte Kaunas. Won a bronze medal at the 2000 Summer Olympics with Lithuania.
- Codi Miller-McIntyre, former player for Wake Forest and current professional player for KK Cedevita Olimpija.
- Damier Pitts, former player for Marshall and current professional player for Godel Rabotnički.
- Stanley Burrell, former player for Xavier and last played Czarni Słupsk.
- Jeff Allen, former player for Virginia Tech. First player in ACC history to record 1,500 career points, 1,000 rebounds, 200 steals and 150 blocked shots. Last played professionally for BC San Carlos.
- Ryan Taylor, former player for Marshall and former professional player for Íþróttafélag Reykjavíkur.
- Anton Gill, former player for Louisville and Nebraska. Current professional player for Koiviston Kipinä Basket of the Finnish 2nd division.
- Ángel Daniel Vassallo, former player for Virginia Tech and currently playing professionally with Leones de Ponce. Member of the Puerto Rico national basketball team.
- Tommy Brenton, former player for Stony Brook. Last played professionally for Link Tochigi Brex. 2013 Lefty Driesell Award winner.
- Lorrenzo Wade, former player for Louisville and San Diego State. Last played professionally for the Delaware 87ers of the NBA G League.
- Tyler Smith, former player for Iowa and Tennessee. Last played for Elitzur Eito Ashkelon of the Israeli National League.
- Anthony Grundy, former player for NC State. Last played professionally for Hacettepe University.
- Maurice Creek, former player for Indiana and George Washington and current professional player for Prometey Kamianske of the Ukrainian Basketball SuperLeague
- J.J. Mann, former player for Belmont and current professional player for Okapi Aalstar
- Ronald Blackshear, former player for Temple and Marshall. Last played professionally for CSU Atlassib Sibiu.
- Tim Smith, former player for East Tennessee State. Last played professionally for BSC Raiffeisen Panthers Fürstenfeld.
- Ricky Shields, former player for Rutgers. Last played for Mitteldeutscher BC.
- Eshaunte Jones, former player for Nebraska and Northern Kentucky.
- Armon Bassett, former player for Indiana and Ohio. Last played professionally for Ironi Ramat Gan
- D. J. Funderburk, former player for NC State and current player for Reggio Emilia
- Andre Washington, former player for Wake Forest and the Raptors 905 of the NBA G League.
- Danjel Purifoy, former player for Auburn and current professional player for FC Porto (basketball)
- Rashard Kelley, former player for Wichita State and current professional player for Aquila Basket Trento

=== Notable former coaches ===
- Kevin Keatts, assistant coach from 1997 to 1999, head coach from 1999 to 2001 and from 2003 to 2011. Former head men's basketball coach at NC State.
- A.W. Hamilton, assistant coach from 2006 to 2011, head coach from 2011 to 2017. Current head men's basketball coach at Eastern Kentucky.
- Lee Martin, assistant coach from 2013-2017, head coach from 2017-2020. Current assistant coach at Ohio.
- Thomas Messinger, assistant coach from 2015-2020, head coach from 2020-2023. Current assistant coach at NJIT.
- Mark Byington, assistant coach for the 2001-2002 season. Current head men's basketball coach at Vanderbilt
- Takayo Siddle, assistant coach for the 2009-2010 season. Current head men's basketball coach at UNC Wilmington.
- James Johnson, assistant for the 1996-1997 season. Former head men's basketball coach at Virginia Tech and NC State.
- Lamar Thornton, assistant coach for the 2015-2016 season. Current assistant coach at Ohio.
- Jake Ness, assistant coach from 2015 to 2017. Current director of basketball operations at Ohio.
- Steve Lepore, assistant coach from 2013 to 2015. Current assistant coach at Eastern Kentucky.
- Mike Allen, assistant coach from 2013 to 2015. Current assistant coach at Akron.
- Chris Zupko, assistant coach from 2000 to 2006. Former assistant director of basketball operations at NC State.
- Thomas Carr, assistant coach for the 2010-2011 season. Current assistant coach at Louisville.
- Jason Slay, assistant coach for the 2012-2013 season. Current assistant coach at Illinois State.
- Austin Burnette, assistant coach for the 2021-2022 season. Current assistant coach at Campbell.
- Devan Carter, assistant coach from 2012 to 2014. Current head women's basketball coach at Lincoln Memorial
- Ambrose Mosley, assistant coach from 2018 to 2020. Current assistant coach at Bethune-Cookman.
- Ryan King, assistant coach from 2017 to 2022. Former director of player development at VMI.
- Tommy Freeman, assistant coach from 2018 to 2022. Current director of basketball operations at Maine.
- Tanner Benton, assistant coach from 2022 to 2023. Current assistant director of basketball operations at UNC Wilmington.

== Records ==
- Consecutive tournament appearances: 19 (2008-current)
- Most points scored in a game, team: 173 (2019)
- Most points scored in a game, individual: 70 (Braxton Beverly; 2016)
- Overall winning streak: 45 (2015-2017)
- Home winning streak: 134 (2019-Current)
- NCAA Division I signees in one season: 13 (2016-2017)

== Results by season (2003–present) ==
Record table
Season	Team	Overall	Conference	Standing	Postseason
Kevin Keatts (Independent) (2003–2011)
2003-04	Kevin Keatts	23-2			National Champions
2004-05	Kevin Keatts	27-1			Final Four
2005-06	Kevin Keatts	28-2			Final Four
2006-07	Kevin Keatts	22-5			Final Four
2007-08	Kevin Keatts	27-0			National Champions
2008-09	Kevin Keatts	27-2			National Runner-Up
2009-10	Kevin Keatts	23-1			Final Four
2010-11	Kevin Keatts	28-1			Final Four
A.W. Hamilton (Independent) (2011–2017)
2011–12	A.W. Hamilton	38–1			National Runner-up
2012–13	A.W. Hamilton	39–6			Elite Eight
2013–14	A.W. Hamilton	32–6			Elite Eight
2014–15	A.W. Hamilton	38–6			Elite Eight
2015–16	A.W. Hamilton	47–1			National Champions
2016–17	A.W. Hamilton	43–2			Final Four
Lee Martin (Independent) (2017–2020)
2017-18	Lee Martin	38-4			Sweet Sixteen
2018-19	Lee Martin	38-4			Elite Eight
2019-20	Lee Martin	37-4			Final Four
Thomas Messinger (Independent) (2020–2023)
2020-21	Thomas Messinger	33-1			Elite Eight
2021-22	Thomas Messinger	37-5			Sweet Sixteen
2022-23	Thomas Messinger	44-2	Elite Prep League	1st	Sweet Sixteen
Ben Veshi (Independent) (2023–present)
2023-24	Ben Veshi	33-10	Elite Prep League	5th	Sweet Sixteen
2024-25	Ben Veshi	36-10	Elite Prep League	6th	Sweet Sixteen
2025-26	Ben Veshi	0-0	Elite Prep League		
Total:		{{{overall}}}			
National champion Postseason invitational champion Conference regular season champion Conference regular season and conference tournament champion Division regular season champion Division regular season and conference tournament champion Conference tournament champion
