= Stan Joplin =

American basketball coach (born 1957)

Biographical details
- Born: June 17, 1957 (age 69); Milan, Michigan, U.S.

Playing career
- 1975–1979: Toledo

Coaching career (HC unless noted)
- 1982–1984: Kent State (assistant)
- 1984–1990: Toledo (assistant)
- 1990–1996: Michigan State (assistant)
- 1996–2008: Toledo
- 2011–2015: Springfield HS
- 2017–2018: Southview HS

Accomplishments and honors

Championships
- MAC regular season (2007)

Awards
- MAC Coach of the Year (2007)

Stan Joplin (born June 17, 1957) is a former head men's basketball coach at the University of Toledo from 1996 to 2008.

== Playing career ==
Joplin played guard at the University of Toledo from 1975 to 1979. He was named to the second-team All-MAC for the 1977–78 and 1978–79 seasons. Joplin made a buzzer-beating shot in a 74–72 victory over Iowa in the first round of the 1979 NCAA Men's Division I Basketball Tournament. During his career, Joplin had an 82–27 record (.752). Joplin was also a member of the 1979 MAC Championship team.

== Coaching career ==
Joplin served as the head men's basketball coach for the University of Toledo for 12 seasons. He was named MAC Coach of the Year after the 2006–2007 season in which Toledo won the Regular Season MAC Championship. He is the second winningest coach in school history. Prior to his time at the University of Toledo Joplin was also the coach for Toledo Start High School. His first team was 0–21 in the 1981/82 school year. He coached the Cougars of Southview to a record of 21–2 in 2017–18.

== Career record ==
Record table
Season	Team	Overall	Conference	Standing	Postseason
Toledo (Mid-American Conference) (1996–2008)
1996–97	Toledo	13–14	6–12	T–8th	
1997–98	Toledo	15–12	10–8	4th (West)	
1998–99	Toledo	19–9	11–7	1st (West)	NIT 1st Round
1999–00	Toledo	18–13	11–7	T–1st (West)	
2000–01	Toledo	22–11	12–6	2nd (West)	NIT 2nd Round
2001–02	Toledo	16–14	11–7	2nd (West)	
2002–03	Toledo	14–15	7–11	7th (West)	
2003–04	Toledo	20–11	12–6	2nd (West)	NIT 1st Round
2004–05	Toledo	16–13	11–7	T-1st (West)	
2005–06	Toledo	20–11	10–8	T-2nd (West)	
2006–07	Toledo	19–13	14–2	1st (Overall)	NIT 1st Round
2007–08	Toledo	11–19	7–8	3rd (West)	
Toledo:		203–155	122–89		
Total:		203–155			
National champion Postseason invitational champion Conference regular season champion Conference regular season and conference tournament champion Division regular season champion Division regular season and conference tournament champion Conference tournament champion

== Personal life ==
Stan's son Shaun Joplin, was a Wide Receiver for the Bowling Green State University football team and is now a special teams coordinator for the Cougars.
