= Jim Ray (basketball) =

American basketball player (1934–1987)

Personal information
- Born: January 12, 1934
- Died: July 20, 1987 (aged 53)
- Listed height: 6 ft 1 in (1.85 m)
- Listed weight: 180 lb (82 kg)

Career information
- High school: Woodward (Cincinnati, Ohio)
- College: Toledo (1953–1956)
- NBA draft: 1956: 5th round, 36th overall pick
- Drafted by: Syracuse Nationals
- Position: Point guard
- Number: 3

Career history
- 1956, 1959: Syracuse Nationals

Career highlights
- First-team All-MAC (1956)
- Stats at NBA.com
- Stats at Basketball Reference

James E. Ray (January 12, 1934 – July 20, 1987) was an American professional basketball player. Ray was selected in the 1956 NBA draft by the Syracuse Nationals after a collegiate career at Toledo. Ray died on July 20, 1987, at the age of 53.

== Career statistics ==
Legend
GP	Games played	GS	Games started	MPG	Minutes per game
FG%	Field goal percentage	3P%	3-point field goal percentage	FT%	Free throw percentage
RPG	Rebounds per game	APG	Assists per game	SPG	Steals per game
BPG	Blocks per game	PPG	Points per game	**Bold**	Career high

=== NBA ===
==== Regular season ====
Year	Team	GP	MPG	FG%	FT%	RPG	APG	PPG
1956–57	Syracuse	**4**	**10.8**	**.182**	**.600**	**1.3**	**.8**	**1.8**
1959–60	Syracuse	**4**	5.3	.167	–	.0	.5	.5
Career		8	8.0	.176	.600	.6	.6	1.1
