= Luke Knapke =

American basketball player

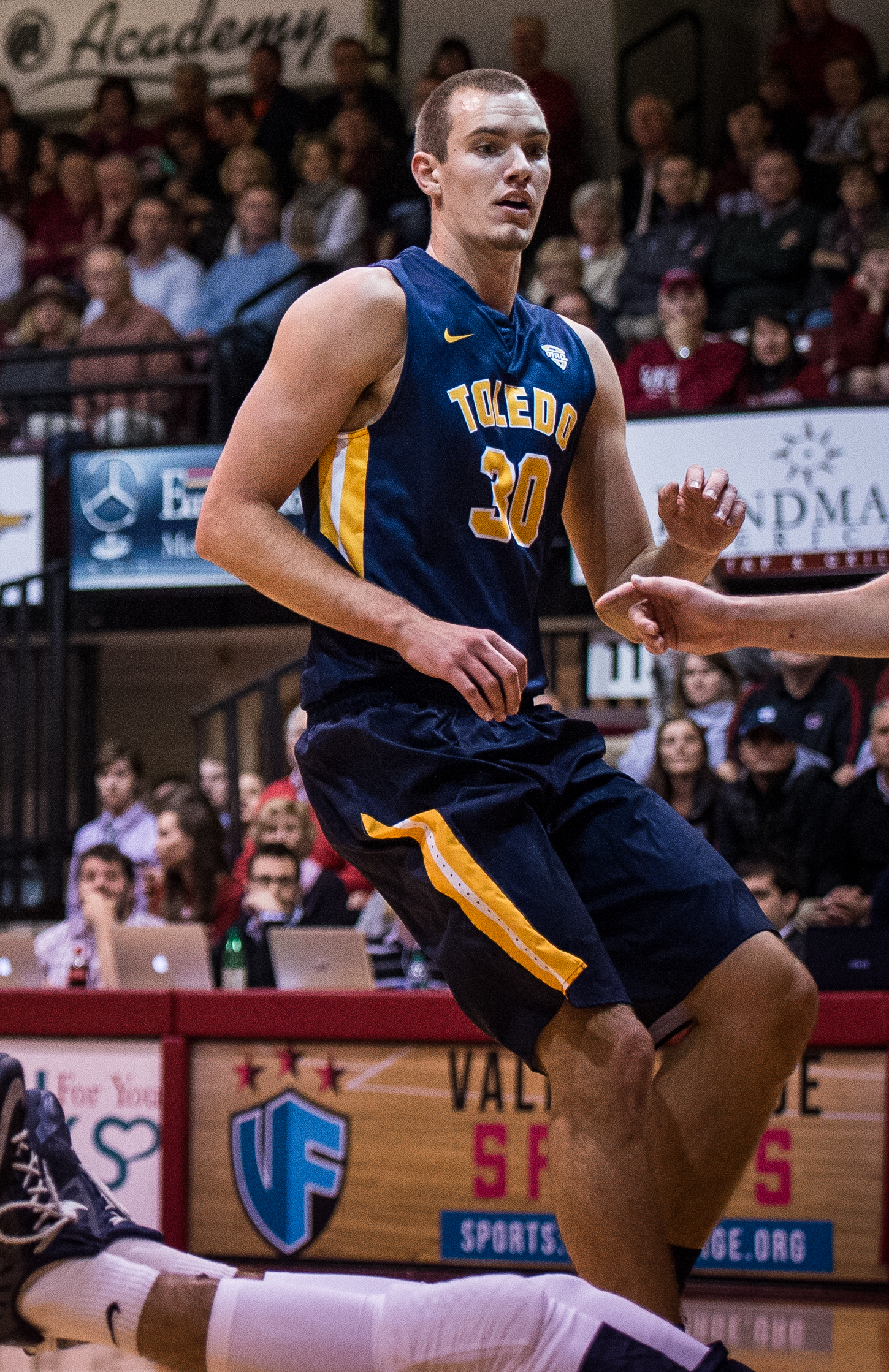

Free agent
- Position: Center

Personal information
- Born: January 10, 1997 (age 29)
- Listed height: 6 ft 11 in (2.11 m)
- Listed weight: 244 lb (111 kg)

Career information
- High school: Marion Local (Maria Stein, Ohio)
- College: Toledo (2016–2020)
- NBA draft: 2020: undrafted
- Playing career: 2020–present

Career history
- 2020–2021: Limburg United

Career highlights
- Third-team All-MAC (2020)

Luke Andrew Knapke (born January 10, 1997) is an American professional basketball player for Limburg United of the Pro Basketball League. He played college basketball for Toledo.

== High school career ==
Knapke attended Marion Local High School. As a junior, he averaged 14.1 points and 7.5 rebounds per game to help his team finish 20–5. Knapke was named to the first-team all-league, second-team all-district and honorable-mention all-state. As a senior, he earned Special Mention All-District IV honors. In July 2014, he committed to Toledo, the first school to offer him a scholarship, over offers from Akron, Wright State, Miami (OH), Kent State, Ball State and Northern Kentucky.

== College career ==
Knapke redshirted his true freshman season to put on weight and learn from star center Nathan Boothe. As a redshirt freshman, he averaged 6.9 points and 4.2 rebounds per game and earned MAC Distinguished Scholar-Athlete recognition. Knapke averaged 10.8 points and 6.3 rebounds per game as a sophomore, shooting 55.3 percent from the field. As a junior, he averaged 10.5 points and 6.6 rebounds per game. On December 4, 2019, Knapke recorded the third triple-double in school history with 12 points, 12 rebounds and a school-record 10 blocks in a win against Cleveland State. On December 8, he scored a career-high 33 points and grabbed 11 rebounds in a 82–72 win over Marshall. Knapke earned MAC West Division player of the week honors on December 10. Knapke averaged 15.8 points, 8.2 rebounds, 2.2 assists, and 1.9 blocks per game as a senior at Toledo, shooting 39.4 percent from three-point range. He was named to the Third Team All-MAC. He finished as Toledo's all-time leader in blocks with 197 and scored 1,451 points in his college career.

== Professional career ==
On April 18, 2020, Knapke signed his first professional contract with Limburg United of the Pro Basketball League.
