= Justin Ingram (basketball) =

American basketball player (born 1985)

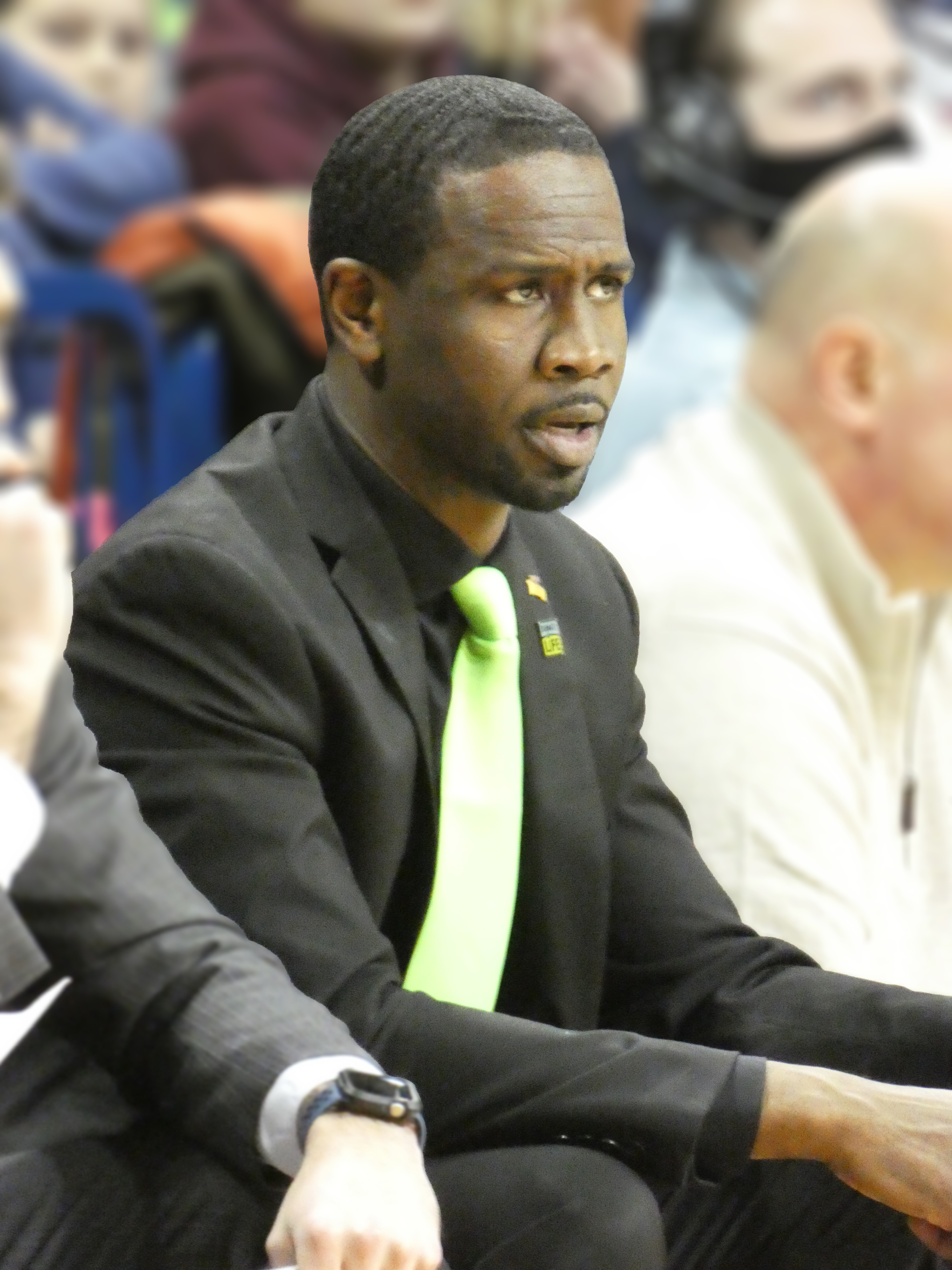
- Ingram with Toledo in 2022

Toledo Rockets
- Title: Associate head coach
- League: Mid-American Conference

Personal information
- Born: January 21, 1985 (age 41) Lansing, Michigan, U.S.
- Listed height: 6 ft 2 in (1.88 m)
- Listed weight: 185 lb (84 kg)

Career information
- High school: Waverly (Lansing, Michigan)
- College: Toledo (2003–2007)
- NBA draft: 2007: undrafted
- Playing career: 2007–2016
- Position: Point guard
- Number: 4, 20
- Coaching career: 2016–present

Career history

Playing
- 2007–2008: Saint-Étienne
- 2008–2009: JL Bourg
- 2009–2010: Stade Clermontois BA
- 2010–2011: Olympique Antibes
- 2011–2012: Factum Sport Debrecen
- 2012–2013: Tartu Ülikool/Rock
- 2013–2014: Poitiers Basket 86
- 2014–2015: Aries Trikala
- 2015–2016: Lions de Geneve

Coaching
- 2016–2017: Olivet (Assistant HC)
- 2017–2018: Toledo (Director of Basketball Operations)
- 2018–2024: Toledo (assistant)
- 2024–present: Toledo (associate)

Career highlights
- NB I/A All-Star (2012); First-team All-MAC (2007); Second-team All-MAC (2006); MAC Freshman of the Year (2004); MAC All-Freshman Team (2004); Toledo Rockets Hall of Fame (2014)

Justin Durel Ingram (born January 21, 1985) is an American former professional basketball player who is currently an associate head coach for the Toledo Rockets men's basketball team. He most recently served as the Assistant Head Coach for the Olivet Comets men's basketball team. He most recently played for Lions de Geneve of the Ligue Nationale de Basketball. He played college basketball for the University of Toledo where he earned Mid-American Conference Freshman of the Year honors, as well as being named to the All-Freshman team and All-Conference first and second teams. From 2007 to 2016, he played for numerous LNB Pro B teams, before playing in top leagues in Hungary, Estonia, Greece and Switzerland.

== High school career ==
Ingram attended Waverly Senior High School in Delta Township, Michigan where he was a member of the 2000 Class A State Championship team as a freshman. As a sophomore, Ingram started on the varsity team averaging 9.9 points per game. He was named All-Conference Honorable Mention and All-Area Special Mention. As a junior, Ingram almost doubled his scoring average averaging 18.5 points per game, 8.6 rebounds and 2.0 assists per game. He was a unanimous selection to the First Team All-Conference, First Team All-Area and All-State Honorable Mention. Ingram was selected one out of 200 players to participate in the Adidas ABCD Basketball Camp in Teaneck, New Jersey.

In October 2002, Ingram committed to the University of Toledo.

As a senior, Ingram's numbers improved again. He averaged 22.6 points per game, 5.2 assists per game and 5.0 rebounds per game. He was named conference Most Valuable Player, unanimous First Team All-Conference, named to the Lansing State Journal Dream Team as well as the Player of the Year. He was also named First Team All-State by the Detroit Free Press, the Associated Press and the Basketball Coaches Association of Michigan.

== College career ==
As a freshman at Toledo, Ingram was named the MAC Freshman of the Year after averaging 10.0 points, 3.0 rebounds, 3.6 assists and 1.3 steals per game. As a sophomore, he averaged 9.3 points, 4.0 rebounds, 3.2 assists and 1.8 steals per game. He moved from point guard to shooting guard as a junior, earning All-MAC second team honors while averaging 14.6 points and guiding the Rockets to the Championship Game of the MAC Tournament. As co-captain his senior year, he led the 2006–07 men's basketball team that won the MAC regular-season championship. He averaged 14.5 points, 4.4 rebounds, 2.8 assists and 2.1 steals per game on his way to All-MAC first team honors as the Rockets went 14–2 in MAC play.

For his career, Ingram ranks eleventh all-time in scoring (1,494 points), fourth in three-pointers (213), fourth in free throw percentage (81.6%), third in steals (217) and fifth in minutes played (3,856). He is tied for third in games played with 123, and was a starter in every game in which he appeared. The Rockets’ record in his four seasons was 75–48, 47–23 in MAC play.

=== College statistics ===
Year	Team	GP	GS	MPG	FG%	3P%	FT%	RPG	APG	SPG	BPG	PPG
2003–04	Toledo	31	31	29.6	.419	.390	.776	3.0	3.6	1.3	.3	10.0
2004–05	Toledo	29	29	28.7	.401	.366	.806	4.0	3.2	1.8	.1	9.3
2005–06	Toledo	31	31	31.6	.406	.337	.876	3.2	2.9	1.9	.3	14.6
2006–07	Toledo	32	32	35.2	.372	.297	.766	4.4	2.8	2.1	.3	14.5

== Professional career ==
=== 2007–08 season ===
Ingram went undrafted in the 2007 NBA draft. In October 2007, he signed with Saint-Étienne Basket of France for the 2007–08 season. In 29 regular-season games, he averaged 14.7 points, 3.6 rebounds, 3.3 assists and 1.6 steals per game. In five play-off games, he averaged 20.8 points, 4.0 rebounds, 3.2 assists and 1.4 steals per game.

=== 2008–09 season ===
In 2008, Ingram signed with JL Bourg-en-Bresse for the 2008–09 season. In 39 total games, he averaged 17.7 points, 3.2 rebounds, 4.9 assists and 1.8 steals per game. Finished 3rd in MVP voting.

=== 2009–10 season ===
In November 2009, Ingram signed with Stade Clermontois BA for the rest of the 2009–10 season. In 27 games, he averaged 15.9 points, 2.5 rebounds, 4.7 assists and 1.3 steals per game. Voted Eurobasket.com All French Pro B honorable mention.

=== 2010–11 season ===
On August 17, 2010, Ingram signed with Olympique Antibes for the 2010–11 season. In 34 games, he averaged 13.9 points, 3.4 rebounds, 4.4 assists and 1.4 steals per game.

=== 2011–12 season ===
In August 2011, Ingram signed a one-year deal with Factum Sport Debrecen of the Hungarian League. In 26 games, he averaged 24.6 points, 3.7 rebounds, 5.7 assists and 2.4 steals per game. He finished the season as the league's leading scorer, resulting in him being placed on the Hungarian Championship All Import Team. Also was voted to the all star team.

=== 2012–13 season ===
On August 6, 2012, Ingram signed with Tartu Ülikool/Rock of Estonia for the 2012–13 season. In 23 games, he averaged 13.8 points, 3.7 rebounds, 4.4 assists and 1.4 steals per game. He was voted All Baltic League honorable mention, All Estonian League First Team, All Estonian League Important Team, as well as the Estonian League Guard of the Year.

=== 2013–14 season ===
In July 2013, Ingram signed with Poitiers Basket 86 of France for the 2013–14 season. In 50 total games, he averaged 12.7 points, 1.9 rebounds, 4.1 assists and 1.1 steals per game. Took Poitiers Basket 86 to the finals where they lost the best of 3 game series to JL Bourg-en-Bresse.

=== 2014–15 season ===
On September 1, 2014, Ingram signed with Aries Trikala of Greece for the 2014–15 season. In 26 total games, he averaged 12.2 points, 4.7 assists, and 3.2 rebounds while playing 32 min per game

=== 2015–16 ===
In September 2015, Ingram signed with Lions de Geneve of Switzerland for the 2015–16 season. In 33 total games, he averaged 10.8 points, 4.5 rebounds, 4.5 assists per game while playing 27 min per game.

== Coaching career ==
=== 2016–17 ===
In July 2016, Ingram was hired to the Olivet Comets men's basketball staff under Steve Ernst as head assistant as well as recruiting coordinator.

=== 2017–2024 ===
In June 2017, Ingram was hired to the Toledo Rockets men's basketball staff as Director of Basketball Operations. In October 2018, Ingram was promoted to assistant coach.

=== 2024–present ===
In July 2024, Ingram was promoted to associate head coach.

== Personal ==
Ingram is the son of Phebeit and Michael Ingram, the latter a NJCAA hall of fame basketball coach at Lansing Community College. Ingram has three siblings, all of whom have played college basketball. Older brother, Mike, played at Lansing Community College; older sister, Alayne, starred at the University of Michigan and was drafted in the WNBA by the Sacramento Monarchs; and younger sister, Jocelyn, played at Grand Valley State University. Ingram is married to Tiewjuan Ingram. Together they have two sons, Justin Jr and Jaxson.
