= 2014–15 Mid-American Conference men's basketball season =

- League: NCAA Division I
- Sport: Basketball
- Teams: 12

Regular season
- League champions: Buffalo, Kent State and Central Michigan
- Season MVP: Justin Moss

Tournament
- Champions: Buffalo
- Runners-up: Central Michigan
- Finals MVP: Xavier Ford

Mid-American men's basketball seasons
- ← 2013–14 2014–15 →

2014–15 Mid-American Conference men's basketball standings
	Conf.				Overall
Team	W		L	PCT	W		L	PCT
East
Buffalo †	12	–	6	.667	23	–	10	.697
Kent State	12	–	6	.667	23	–	12	.657
Bowling Green	11	–	7	.611	21	–	12	.636
Akron	9	–	9	.500	21	–	14	.600
Miami	8	–	10	.444	13	–	19	.406
Ohio	5	–	13	.278	10	–	20	.333
West
Central Michigan	12	–	6	.667	23	–	9	.719
Toledo	11	–	7	.611	20	–	13	.606
Western Michigan	10	–	8	.556	20	–	14	.588
Eastern Michigan	8	–	10	.444	21	–	14	.600
Northern Illinois	8	–	10	.444	14	–	16	.467
Ball State	2	–	16	.111	7	–	23	.233
† 2015 MAC tournament winner

The 2014–15 Mid-American Conference men's basketball season began with practices in October 2014, followed by the start of the 2014–15 NCAA Division I men's basketball season in November. Conference play began in January 2015 and concluded in March 2015. Buffalo, Kent State and Central Michigan shared the regular season title with a conference record of 12–6. Second-seeded Buffalo defeated top-seeded Central Michigan in the MAC tournament final and represented the MAC in the NCAA tournament where they lost to West Virginia.

== Preseason awards ==
The preseason poll and league awards were announced by the league office on October 28, 2014.

=== Preseason men's basketball poll ===
(First place votes in parentheses)

==== East Division ====
1. Akron 117 (17)
2. Ohio 92 (2)
3. Kent State 66
4. Buffalo 58
5. Bowling Green 52 (1)
6. Miami 35

==== West Division ====
1. Toledo 118 (18)
2. Western Michigan 94 (1)
3. Eastern Michigan 68
4. Northern Illinois 63
5. Central Michigan 49 (1)
6. Ball State 28

==== Tournament champs ====
Toledo (15), Akron (1), Bowling Green (1), Central Michigan (1), Ohio (1), Western Michigan (1)

=== Honors ===
Honor	Recipient
Preseason All-MAC East	Demetrius Treadwell, Sr., F, Akron
Preseason All-MAC East	Richaun Holmes, Sr., F, Bowling Green
Preseason All-MAC East	Will Regan, Sr., F, Buffalo
Preseason All-MAC East	Kris Brewer, Kent State, Sr., G, Kent State
Preseason All-MAC East	Maurice Ndour, Sr., F, Ohio
Preseason All-MAC West	Chris Fowler, Jr., G, Central Michigan
Preseason All-MAC West	Karrington Ward, Sr., F, Eastern Michigan
Preseason All-MAC West	Julius Brown, Sr., G, Toledo
Preseason All-MAC West	Justin Drummond, Sr., G/F, Toledo
Preseason All-MAC West	David Brown, Grad., G, Western Michigan

== Postseason ==
=== Postseason awards ===
1. Coach of the Year: Keno Davis, Central Michigan
2. Player of the Year: Justin Moss, Buffalo
3. Freshman of the Year: Sean Sellers, Ball State
4. Defensive Player of the Year: Richaun Holmes, Bowling Green
5. Sixth Man of the Year: Kris Brewer, Kent State

=== Honors ===
Honor	Recipient
Postseason All-MAC First Team	Richaun Holmes, Bowling Green F
Postseason All-MAC First Team	Justin Moss, Buffalo, F
Postseason All-MAC First Team	Chris Fowler, Central Michigan, G
Postseason All-MAC First Team	Jimmy Hall, Kent State, F
Postseason All-MAC First Team	Julius Brown, Toledo, G
Postseason All-MAC Second Team	Shannon Evans, Buffalo, G
Postseason All-MAC Second Team	Devareaux Manley, Kent State, G
Postseason All-MAC Second Team	Eric Washington, Miami, G
Postseason All-MAC Second Team	Maurice Ndour, Ohio, F
Postseason All-MAC Second Team	David Brown, Western Michigan, G
Postseason All-MAC Third Team	Pat Forsythe, Akron, C
Postseason All-MAC Third Team	John Simons, Central Michigan, F
Postseason All-MAC Third Team	Raven Lee, Eastern Michigan, G
Postseason All-MAC Third Team	Justin Drummond, Toledo, G/F
Postseason All-MAC Third Team	J.D. Weatherspoon, Toledo, F
Postseason All-MAC Honorable Mention	Karrington Ward, Eastern Michigan, F
Postseason All-MAC Honorable Mention	Kris Brewer, Kent State, G
Postseason All-MAC Honorable Mention	Javarez Willis, Ohio, G
Postseason All-MAC Honorable Mention	Nathan Boothe, Toledo, C
Postseason All-MAC Honorable Mention	Connar Tava, Western Michigan, F
All-MAC Freshman Team	Noah Robotham, Akron, G
All-MAC Freshman Team	Sean Sellers, Ball State, F
All-MAC Freshman Team	Lamonte Bearden, Buffalo, G
All-MAC Freshman Team	Josh Kozinski, Central Michigan, G
All-MAC Freshman Team	Thomas Wilder, Western Michigan, G

== See also ==
2014–15 Mid-American Conference women's basketball season
