= 2014–15 Western Michigan Broncos men's basketball team =

American college basketball season

2014–15 Western Michigan Broncos men's basketball

CIT, First round
- Conference: Mid-American Conference
- West Division
- Record: 20–14 (10–8 MAC)
- Head coach: Steve Hawkins (12th season)
- Assistant coaches: Clayton Bates; Larry Farmer; James Holland
- Home arena: University Arena

2014–15 Mid-American Conference men's basketball standings
	Conf.				Overall
Team	W		L	PCT	W		L	PCT
East
Buffalo †	12	–	6	.667	23	–	10	.697
Kent State	12	–	6	.667	23	–	12	.657
Bowling Green	11	–	7	.611	21	–	12	.636
Akron	9	–	9	.500	21	–	14	.600
Miami	8	–	10	.444	13	–	19	.406
Ohio	5	–	13	.278	10	–	20	.333
West
Central Michigan	12	–	6	.667	23	–	9	.719
Toledo	11	–	7	.611	20	–	13	.606
Western Michigan	10	–	8	.556	20	–	14	.588
Eastern Michigan	8	–	10	.444	21	–	14	.600
Northern Illinois	8	–	10	.444	14	–	16	.467
Ball State	2	–	16	.111	7	–	23	.233
† 2015 MAC tournament winner

The 2014–15 Western Michigan Broncos men's basketball team represented Western Michigan University (WMU) during the 2014–15 NCAA Division I men's basketball season. The Broncos, led by 12th year head coach Steve Hawkins, played their home games at University Arena as members of the West Division of the Mid-American Conference (MAC). They finished the season 20–14, 10–8 in MAC play to finish in third place in the West Division. They advanced to the second round of the MAC tournament where they lost to Akron. They were invited to the CollegeInsider.com Tournament where they lost in the first round to Cleveland State.

== Roster ==
The 2014–15 roster is shown in the following table:

Number	Name	Position	Height	Weight	Year	Hometown
1	Tucker Haymond	Guard/forward	6′ 6″	220	Sophomore	Seattle, Washington
2	Connar Tava	Forward	6′ 6″	235	Junior	Macomb, Michigan
4	Jared Klein	Guard	6′ 2″	175	Junior	Otsego, Michigan
5	David Brown	Guard	6′ 4″	205	Senior (redshirt)	Roscoe, Illinois
11	Bishop Robinson	Guard	6′ 3″	190	Freshman (redshirt)	Kalamazoo, Michigan
20	Tim Brennan	Guard/forward	6′ 5″	200	Senior	Chicago, Illinois
22	Austin Richie	Guard	6′ 3″	185	Senior	Lowell, Indiana
30	Von Washington	Guard	6′ 2″	175	Sophomore (redshirt)	Kalamazoo, Michigan
31	Mario Matasovic	Forward	6′ 8″	215	Sophomore	Croatia
32	Taylor Perry	Guard	6′ 5″	200	Junior	Rochester, Michigan
34	A. J. Avery	Forward	6′ 7″	205	Junior	Chicago, Illinois
35	Charles Harris	Guard/forward	6′ 5″	195	Sophomore (redshirt)	Antioch, Illinois
40	Kellen McCormick	Forward	6′ 8″	215	Sophomore (redshirt)	West Bloomfield, Michigan

== Schedule ==
The following is WMU's schedule.

Date time, TV	Opponent	Result	Record	Site (attendance) city, state
Regular season
November 16, 2014*; 2:00 pm	Aquinas	W 87–57	1–0	University Arena (2,022); Kalamazoo, MI
November 19, 2014*; 7:00 pm, WMYD	at Oakland	W 82–71	2–0	Athletics Center O'rena (2,415); Rochester, MI
November 22, 2014*; 1:00 pm	Drake	W 91–75	3–0	University Arena (2,328); Kalamazoo, MI
November 24, 2014*; 10:00 pm	at San Diego; Wooden Legacy	W 77–70	3–1	Jenny Craig Pavilion (1,836); San Diego, CA
November 27, 2014*; 8:30 pm, ESPNU	vs. Long Beach State; Wooden Legacy	W 73–55	3–2	Titan Gym (2,241); Fullerton, CA
November 28, 2014*; 9:00 pm, ESPN3	vs. San Jose State; Wooden Legacy	W 79–60	4–2	Titan Gym (N/A); Fullerton, CA
November 30, 2014*; 2:00 pm, ESPNU	vs. San Diego; Wooden Legacy	W 68–66	5–2	Honda Center (N/A); Anaheim, CA
December 6, 2014*; 4:00 pm	at Northeastern	W 81–69	5–3	Matthews Arena (1,116); Boston, MA
December 14, 2014*; 8:00 pm	at Pacific	W 80–72	6–3	Alex G. Spanos Center (1,736); Stockton, CA
December 20, 2014*; 3:00 pm, BTN	at Northwestern	W 67–61	6–4	Welsh-Ryan Arena (6,612); Evanston, IL
December 22, 2014*; 7:00 pm	Alabama A&M	W 71–62	7–4	University Arena (3,108); Kalamazoo, MI
December 30, 2014*; 7:00 pm	New Hampshire	W 70–56	8–4	University Arena (N/A); Kalamazoo, MI
January 2, 2015*; 7:00 pm	Rochester College	W 69–54	9–4	University Arena (2,188); Kalamazoo, MI
January 6, 2015; 7:00 pm	at Akron	W 72–52	9–5 (0–1)	James A. Rhodes Arena (2,741); Akron, OH
January 10, 2015; 1:00 pm	Buffalo	W 78–68	10–5 (1–1)	University Arena (2,507); Kalamazoo, MI
January 14, 2015; 7:00 pm, ESPN3	Ball State	W 95–93 ^{2OT}	11–5 (2–1)	University Arena (2,288); Kalamazoo, MI
January 17, 2015; 7:00 pm	at Toledo	W 81–78 ^{OT}	12–5 (3–1)	Savage Arena (6,089); Toledo, OH
January 21, 2015; 7:00 pm	at Miami (OH)	W 69–58	13–5 (4–1)	Millett Hall (667); Oxford, OH
January 24, 2015; 2:00 pm	Akron	W 71–69	13–6 (4–2)	University Arena (3,837); Kalamazoo, MI
January 27, 2015; 7:00 pm, ESPN3	at Buffalo	W 77–71	13–7 (4–3)	Alumni Arena (3,931); Amherst, NY
January 31, 2015; 12:00 pm	at Eastern Michigan; Michigan MAC Trophy	W 69–63	13–8 (4–4)	Convocation Center (1,018); Ypsilanti, MI
February 4, 2015; 7:00 pm	Kent State	W 67–66	14–8 (5–4)	University Arena (2,433); Kalamazoo, MI
February 7, 2015; 2:00 pm, ESPN3	at Central Michigan; Michigan MAC Trophy	W 70–65	14–9 (5–5)	McGuirk Arena (5,350); Mount Pleasant, MI
February 10, 2015; 7:00 pm, ESPN3	at Bowling Green	W 65–49	14–10 (5–6)	Stroh Center (1,474); Bowling Green, OH
February 14, 2015; 4:30 pm	Northern Illinois	W 69–65	15–10 (6–6)	University Arena (2,712); Kalamazoo, MI
February 18, 2015; 7:00 pm	Ohio	W 80–69	16–10 (7–6)	University Arena (2,517); Kalamazoo, MI
February 21, 2015; 2:00 pm	Toledo	W 97–87	16–11 (7–7)	University Arena (3,451); Kalamazoo, MI
February 24, 2015; 7:00 pm	at Ball State	W 53–48	17–11 (8–7)	John E. Worthen Arena (2,794); Muncie, IN
February 28, 2015; 4:30 pm	Eastern Michigan; Michigan MAC Trophy	W 80–72	18–11 (9–7)	University Arena; Kalamazoo, MI
March 3, 2015; 8:00 pm, ESPN3	at Northern Illinois	W 65–63	18–12 (9–8)	Convocation Center (992); DeKalb, IL
March 6, 2015; 7:00 pm	Central Michigan; Michigan MAC Trophy	W 74–62	19–12 (10–8)	University Arena (4,239); Kalamazoo, MI
MAC tournament
March 9, 2015; 7:00 pm	Ohio; First round	W 82–74	20–12	University Arena (N/A); Kalamazoo, MI
March 11, 2015; 9:00 pm	vs. Akron; Second round	W 58–45	20–13	Quicken Loans Arena (2,411); Cleveland, OH
CIT
March 18, 2015*; 7:00 pm	Cleveland State; First round	L 57–86	20–14	University Arena (1,112); Kalamazoo, MI
*Non-conference game. ^{#}Rankings from AP Poll. (#) Tournament seedings in parentheses. All times are in Eastern Time.
