= 2014–15 Miami RedHawks men's basketball team =

American college basketball season

2014–15 Miami RedHawks men's basketball
- Conference: Mid-American Conference
- East Division
- Record: 13–19 (8–10 MAC)
- Head coach: John Cooper (3rd season)
- Assistant coaches: Rick Duckett; Sheldon Everett; Trey Meyer
- Home arena: Millett Hall

2014–15 Mid-American Conference men's basketball standings
	Conf.				Overall
Team	W		L	PCT	W		L	PCT
East
Buffalo †	12	–	6	.667	23	–	10	.697
Kent State	12	–	6	.667	23	–	12	.657
Bowling Green	11	–	7	.611	21	–	12	.636
Akron	9	–	9	.500	21	–	14	.600
Miami	8	–	10	.444	13	–	19	.406
Ohio	5	–	13	.278	10	–	20	.333
West
Central Michigan	12	–	6	.667	23	–	9	.719
Toledo	11	–	7	.611	20	–	13	.606
Western Michigan	10	–	8	.556	20	–	14	.588
Eastern Michigan	8	–	10	.444	21	–	14	.600
Northern Illinois	8	–	10	.444	14	–	16	.467
Ball State	2	–	16	.111	7	–	23	.233
† 2015 MAC tournament winner

The 2014–15 Miami RedHawks men's basketball team represented Miami University during the 2014–15 NCAA Division I men's basketball season. The RedHawks, led by third year head coach John Cooper, played their home games at Millett Hall, as members of the East Division of the Mid-American Conference.

They finished the season 13–19, 8–10 in MAC play to finish in fifth place in the East Division. They lost in the first round of the MAC tournament to Eastern Michigan.

== Roster ==
2014–15 Miami RedHawks men's basketball team
Players
Coaches

Pos.	#	Name	Height	Weight	Year	Previous school	Hometown
G	0	Geovonie McKnight	6 ft 3 in (1.91 m)	182 lb (83 kg)	Jr	Middletown HS	Middletown, OH
G	1	Zach McCormick	6 ft 2 in (1.88 m)	160 lb (73 kg)	Fr	Turpin HS	Cincinnati, OH
F	2	Rod Mills	6 ft 7 in (2.01 m)	200 lb (91 kg)	Fr	St. Xavier HS	Cincinnati, OH
G	3	Will Sullivan	6 ft 3 in (1.91 m)	190 lb (86 kg)	Sr	York HS	Elmhurst, IL
F	4	Joshua Oswald	6 ft 7 in (2.01 m)	225 lb (102 kg)	So	Caulfield Grammar	Melbourne, AUS
G	5	Jaryd Eustace	6 ft 7 in (2.01 m)	201 lb (91 kg)	So	Brisbane Boys	Brisbane, Australia
F	11	Logan McLane	6 ft 9 in (2.06 m)	215 lb (98 kg)	Fr	Greenfield School	Winterville, NC
F/C	12	LJ Jr. Livingston	6 ft 10 in (2.08 m)	190 lb (86 kg)	Jr	Patterson Mill HS; Pensacola State	Upper Marlboro, MD
G	20	Tre Hawkins	5 ft 10 in (1.78 m)	155 lb (70 kg)	Fr	Moeller HS	Cincinnati, OH
F	21	Kalif Wright	6 ft 7 in (2.01 m)	237 lb (108 kg)	Jr	Oak Hill HS; Kilgore	Oak Hill, WV
G	22	Willie Moore	6 ft 3 in (1.91 m)	198 lb (90 kg)	Jr	Aiken HS; Oregon	Cincinnati, OH
F	24	Chris Bryant	6 ft 8 in (2.03 m)	200 lb (91 kg)	Jr	Rickards, HS; College of Central Florida	Tallahassee, FL
G	33	Eric Washington	5 ft 10 in (1.78 m)	178 lb (81 kg)	Jr	Keenan; Presbyterian	Columbia, SC
F	35	Brian Oddo	6 ft 6 in (1.98 m)	205 lb (93 kg)	Jr	Providence Catholic HS	New Lenox, IL
C	40	John Hawkins	7 ft 0 in (2.13 m)	252 lb (114 kg)	RS Jr	Troy HS; Palm Beach Atlantic	Troy, MI
G		Ali Barnes	6 ft 0 in (1.83 m)	183 lb (83 kg)	So	Lakota West HS; Concord	West Chester, OH
G		Jake Bischoff	6 ft 3 in (1.91 m)	195 lb (88 kg)	Jr	Olentangy Liberty HS; Concord/Otterbein	Powell, OH
G		Dion Wade	6 ft 6 in (1.98 m)	185 lb (84 kg)	So	Findlay Prep; Auburn	Antwerp, Belgium

Head coach

- John Cooper (Wichita State)

Assistant coach(es)

- Rick Duckett (North Carolina)
- Sheldon Everett (South Carolina)
- Trey Meyer (Clemson)

Legend

- (C) Team captain
- (S) Suspended
- (I) Ineligible
- (W) Walk-on
- Injured
- Current redshirt

== Schedule ==
Date time, TV	Opponent	Result	Record	Site (attendance) city, state
Exhibition
11/08/2014*; 3:30 pm	Edinboro	L 60–71		Millett Hall (N/A); Oxford, OH
Regular season
11/16/2014*; 2:00 pm	Southern Utah	W 76-63	1–0	Millett Hall (972); Oxford, OH
11/19/2014*; 7:00 pm	Evansville	L 50–69	1–1	Millett Hall (826); Oxford, OH
11/22/2014*; 3:30 pm	Liberty; Cancún Challenge	W 63–52	2–1	Millett Hall (1,058); Oxford, OH
11/25/2014*; 9:30 pm, CBSSN	vs. Northwestern; Cancún Challenge	L 46–55	2–2	Hard Rock Hotel Riviera Maya (650); Cancún, MX
11/26/2014*; 7:00 pm	vs. Virginia Tech; Cancún Challenge	L 63–78	2–3	Hard Rock Hotel Riviera Maya (650); Cancún, MX
11/30/2014*; 1:00 pm	Elon; Cancún Challenge	L 68–70	2–4	Millett Hall (641); Oxford, OH
12/03/2014*; 7:00 pm	Dayton	L 62–66	2–5	Millett Hall (2,365); Oxford, OH
12/06/2014*; 7:00 pm	at IPFW	L 78–86	2–6	Hilliard Gates Sports Center (1,246); Fort Wayne, IN
12/14/2014*; 5:30 pm	at Wright State	L 59–68	2–7	Nutter Center (3,752); Dayton, OH
12/17/2014*; 7:00 pm	Longwood	W 71–60	3–7	Millett Hall (470); Oxford, OH
12/22/2014*; 6:00 pm	at No. 21 Ohio State	L 55–93	3–8	Value City Arena (15,018); Columbus, OH
12/29/2014*; 7:00 pm	Capital	W 69–46	4–8	Millett Hall (685); Oxford, OH
1/03/2015*; 3:30 pm	UMKC	W 66–61	5–8	Millett Hall (579); Oxford, OH
1/07/2015; 7:00 pm	Buffalo	L 72–79	5–9 (0–1)	Millett Hall (538); Oxford, OH
1/10/2015; 5:30 pm	Eastern Michigan	W 82–81 ^{OT}	6–9 (1–1)	Millett Hall (987); Oxford, OH
1/14/2015; 7:00 pm, ESPN3	at Central Michigan	L 77–105	6–10 (1–2)	McGuirk Arena (2,724); Mount Pleasant, MI
1/17/2015; 3:00 pm, ESPN3	at Buffalo	L 68–77	6–11 (1–3)	Alumni Arena (3,268); Amherst, NY
1/21/2015; 7:00 pm	Western Michigan	L 58–69	6–12 (1–4)	Millett Hall (667); Oxford, OH
1/24/2015; 4:00 pm, ESPN3	at Northern Illinois	W 60–55	7–12 (2–4)	Convocation Center (1,774); DeKalb, IL
1/27/2015; 7:00 pm, ESPN3	at Toledo	L 65–70	7–13 (2–5)	Savage Arena (4,708); Toledo, OH
1/31/2015; 3:30 pm, ESPN3	Ball State	W 79–73	8–13 (3–5)	Millett Hall (1,691); Oxford, OH
2/04/2015; 7:00 pm	Northern Illinois	L 67–69	8–14 (3–6)	Millett Hall (1,147); Oxford, OH
2/07/2015; 7:00 pm	at Kent State	L 60–61	8–15 (3–7)	Memorial Athletic and Convocation Center (3,510); Kent, OH
2/10/2015; 7:00 pm	at Eastern Michigan	L 69–83	8–16 (3–8)	Convocation Center (460); Ypsilanti, MI
2/14/2015; 3:30 pm, ESPN3	Ohio	W 77–66	9–16 (4–8)	Millett Hall (2,196); Oxford, OH
2/18/2015; 7:00 pm, ESPN3	at Bowling Green	W 67–56	10–16 (5–8)	Stroh Center (2,002); Bowling Green, OH
2/21/2015; 7:30 pm	at Akron	W 57–52	11–16 (6–8)	James A. Rhodes Arena (4,700); Akron, OH
2/24/2015; 7:00 pm	Kent State	W 86–81 ^{OT}	12–16 (7–8)	Millett Hall (920); Oxford, OH
2/28/2015; 3:30 pm	Bowling Green	L 57–62	12–17 (7–9)	Millett Hall (1,905); Oxford, OH
3/03/2015; 7:00 pm	Akron	W 70–63	13–17 (8–9)	Millett Hall (1,269); Oxford, OH
3/06/2015; 7:00 pm	at Ohio	L 65–95	13–18 (8–10)	Convocation Center (5,727); Athens, OH
MAC tournament
3/09/2015; 7:30 pm	at Eastern Michigan; First round	L 61–62 ^{OT}	13–19	Convocation Center (827); Ypsilanti, MI
*Non-conference game. ^{#}Rankings from AP Poll. (#) Tournament seedings in parentheses. All times are in Eastern Time.
