= 2014–15 Central Michigan Chippewas men's basketball team =

American college basketball season

2014–15 Central Michigan Chippewas men's basketball

MAC regular season co–champions MAC West Division champions

NIT, First round
- Conference: Mid-American Conference
- West Division
- Record: 23–9 (12–6 MAC)
- Head coach: Keno Davis (3rd season)
- Assistant coaches: Kevin Gamble; Jeff Smith; Kyle Gerdeman
- Home arena: McGuirk Arena

2014–15 Mid-American Conference men's basketball standings
	Conf.				Overall
Team	W		L	PCT	W		L	PCT
East
Buffalo †	12	–	6	.667	23	–	10	.697
Kent State	12	–	6	.667	23	–	12	.657
Bowling Green	11	–	7	.611	21	–	12	.636
Akron	9	–	9	.500	21	–	14	.600
Miami	8	–	10	.444	13	–	19	.406
Ohio	5	–	13	.278	10	–	20	.333
West
Central Michigan	12	–	6	.667	23	–	9	.719
Toledo	11	–	7	.611	20	–	13	.606
Western Michigan	10	–	8	.556	20	–	14	.588
Eastern Michigan	8	–	10	.444	21	–	14	.600
Northern Illinois	8	–	10	.444	14	–	16	.467
Ball State	2	–	16	.111	7	–	23	.233
† 2015 MAC tournament winner

The 2014–15 Central Michigan Chippewas men's basketball team represented Central Michigan University during the 2014–15 NCAA Division I men's basketball season. The Chippewas, led by third year head coach Keno Davis, played their home games at McGuirk Arena, as members of the West Division of the Mid-American Conference. They finished the season 23–9, 12–6 in MAC play to be champions of the West Division and share the overall MAC regular season championship with Buffalo. They advanced to the championship game of the MAC tournament where they lost to Buffalo. As a conference champion, and #1 seed in their conference tournament, who failed to win their conference tournament they received an automatic bid to the National Invitation Tournament where they lost in the first round to Louisiana Tech.

== Previous season ==
The Chippewas finished the season 10–21, 3–15 in MAC play to finish in fifth place in the West Division. They lost in the first round of the MAC tournament to Eastern Michigan.

== Off season ==
=== Departures ===
Name	Number	Pos.	Height	Weight	Year	Hometown	Notes
DeAndray Buckley	2	G/F	6'4"	209	Senior	Romulus, MI	Graduated
Sheldon Lowman	5	G	6'1"	177	Junior	Detroit, MI	Suspended for a warrant
Nick Carols	35	G/F	6'7"	191	Freshman	Ashland, MO	Transferred to Lindenwood
Zach Saylor	41	F	6'8"	235	Senior	Lansing, MI	Graduated

== Recruiting class of 2014 ==
College recruiting information
Name	Hometown	School	Height	Weight	Commit date
DaRohn Scott; C	Kentwood, MI	Grand Rapids Christian High School	6 ft 8 in (2.03 m)	200 lb (91 kg)	Apr 12, 2014
DaRohn Scott; C	Recruit ratings: Scout: Rivals: (69)				
Luke Meyer; PF	Addison, MI	Addison High School	6 ft 10 in (2.08 m)	205 lb (93 kg)	Dec 2, 2014
Luke Meyer; PF	Recruit ratings: Scout: Rivals: (NR)				
Filip Medjo; SG	Belgrade, Serbia	Impact Academy	6 ft 4 in (1.93 m)	198 lb (90 kg)	Apr 12, 2014
Filip Medjo; SG	Recruit ratings: Scout: Rivals: (NR)				
Overall recruit ranking:
Note: In many cases, Scout, Rivals, 247Sports, On3, and ESPN may conflict in their listings of height and weight.; In these cases, the average was taken. ESPN grades are on a 100-point scale.; Sources: "2014 Team Ranking". Rivals.

=== Recruiting class of 2015 ===
College recruiting information
Name	Hometown	School	Height	Weight	Commit date
Corey Redman; SG	Boyne City, MI	Boyne City High School	6 ft 4 in (1.93 m)	180 lb (82 kg)	Aug 3, 2012
Corey Redman; SG	Recruit ratings: Scout: Rivals: (NR)				
Overall recruit ranking:
Note: In many cases, Scout, Rivals, 247Sports, On3, and ESPN may conflict in their listings of height and weight.; In these cases, the average was taken. ESPN grades are on a 100-point scale.; Sources: "2015 Team Ranking". Rivals.

== Roster ==
2014–15 Central Michigan Chippewas men's basketball team
Players
Coaches

Pos.	#	Name	Height	Weight	Year	Previous school	Hometown
G/F	1	Spencer Krannitz	6 ft 4 in (1.93 m)	202 lb (92 kg)	Jr	North Muskegon HS	North Muskegon, MI
F	2	Luke Meyer	6 ft 11 in (2.11 m)	221 lb (100 kg)	Fr	Addison HS	Addison, MI
G	3	Derrick Richardson, Jr.	6 ft 4 in (1.93 m)	200 lb (91 kg)	Jr	Ypsilanti HS	Ypsilanti, MI
G	4	Rayshawn Simmons	6 ft 4 in (1.93 m)	185 lb (84 kg)	Jr	Moberly Area CC	St. Louis, MO
G	5	Braylon Rayson	5 ft 9 in (1.75 m)	185 lb (84 kg)	So	West Mesquite HS	Dallas, TX
G	10	Austin Stewart	6 ft 6 in (1.98 m)	206 lb (93 kg)	Jr	West HS	Normal, IL
C	11	Milos Cabarkapa	7 ft 0 in (2.13 m)	237 lb (108 kg)	RS Fr	Impact Academy	Belgrade, Serbia
G	12	Josh Kozinski	6 ft 4 in (1.93 m)	170 lb (77 kg)	RS Fr	Edwardsburg HS	Edwardsburg, MI
G	13	Filip Medjo	6 ft 3 in (1.91 m)	210 lb (95 kg)	Fr	Impact Academy	Belgrade, Serbia
G	15	Chris Fowler	6 ft 1 in (1.85 m)	191 lb (87 kg)	Jr	Detroit Country Day School	Southfield, MI
G	23	DaRohn Scott	6 ft 8.5 in (2.04 m)	230 lb (104 kg)	Fr	Grand Rapids Christian HS	Grand Rapids, MI
G	30	Austin Keel	6 ft 3 in (1.91 m)	182 lb (83 kg)	Sr	Winter Park HS	Winter Springs, FL
F	32	Blake Hibbitts	6 ft 7 in (2.01 m)	212 lb (96 kg)	Jr	Hudsonville HS	Hudsonville, MI
F	34	John Simons	6 ft 8 in (2.03 m)	221 lb (100 kg)	Jr	Cadillac HS	Cadillac, MI

Head coach

- Keno Davis (Iowa)

Assistant coach(es)

- Kevin Gamble (Iowa)
- Jeff Smith (Southeast Missouri State)
- Kyle Gerdeman (Alma)

Legend

- (C) Team captain
- (S) Suspended
- (I) Ineligible
- (W) Walk-on
- Injured
- Current redshirt

Roster

== Schedule and results ==
Date time, TV	Rank^{#}	Opponent^{#}	Result	Record	Site (attendance) city, state
Exhibition
11/09/2014*; 7:00 pm		Saginaw Valley State	W 68–61		McGuirk Arena (1,568); Mount Pleasant, MI
Non-conference games
11/14/2014*; 7:00 pm		Alma	W 106–64	1–0	McGuirk Arena (2,308); Mount Pleasant, MI
11/18/2014*; 7:00 pm		Youngstown State	W 75–63	2–0	McGuirk Arena (2,165); Mount Pleasant, MI
11/21/2014*; 7:00 pm		Maine; Central Michigan Tournament	W 76–48	3–0	McGuirk Arena (2,115); Mount Pleasant, MI
11/23/2014*; 12:30 pm		Arkansas–Pine Bluff; Central Michigan Tournament	W 75–43	4–0	McGuirk Arena (1,556); Mount Pleasant, MI
11/29/2014*; 7:00 pm		Grand Canyon	W 79–77	5–0	McGuirk Arena (1,465); Mount Pleasant, MI
12/02/2014*; 8:00 pm		at Bradley	L 73–84	5–1	Carver Arena (4,204); Peoria, IL
12/06/2014*; 1:00 pm, ESPN3		SIU Edwardsville	W 94–61	6–1	McGuirk Arena (1,789); Mount Pleasant, MI
12/17/2014*; 8:00 pm		at Northwestern	W 80–67	7–1	Welsh-Ryan Arena (5,820); Evansville, IL
12/19/2014*; 7:00 pm		Concordia (Michigan)	W 97–60	8–1	McGuirk Arena (1,519); Mount Pleasant, MI
12/22/2014*; 8:00 pm		at McNeese State	W 87–58	9–1	Burton Coliseum (567); Lake Charles, LA
01/02/2015*; 7:00 pm		Central Penn	W 125–80	10–1	McGuirk Arena (1,607); Mount Pleasant, MI
Conference games
01/06/2015; 7:00 pm		at Toledo	W 65–62	11–1 (1–0)	Savage Arena (4,584); Toledo, OH
01/10/2015; 4:30 pm		at Ball State	L 65–83	11–2 (1–1)	John E. Worthen Arena (3,036); Muncie, IN
01/14/2015; 7:00 pm, ESPN3		Miami (OH)	W 105–77	12–2 (2–1)	McGuirk Arena (2,724); Mount Pleasant, MI
01/17/2015; 7:00 pm		at Akron	L 76–82	12–3 (2–2)	James A. Rhodes Arena (3,513); Akron, OH
01/21/2015; 7:00 pm, ESPN3		Buffalo	W 84–73	13–3 (3–2)	McGuirk Arena (2,210); Mount Pleasant, MI
01/24/2015; 4:00 pm, ESPN3		Eastern Michigan; Michigan MAC Trophy	W 65–51	14–3 (4–2)	McGuirk Arena (4,041); Mount Pleasant, MI
01/27/2015; 7:00 pm		at Kent State	L 53–63	14–4 (4–3)	MAC Center (3,522); Kent, OH
01/31/2015; 4:30 pm, ESPN3		Ohio	W 74–69	15–4 (5–3)	McGuirk Arena (4,403); Mount Pleasant, MI
02/04/2015; 7:00 pm, ESPN3		Bowling Green	L 74–76 ^{OT}	15–5 (5–4)	McGuirk Arena (2,474); Mount Pleasant, MI
02/07/2015; 2:00 pm, ESPN3		Western Michigan; Michigan MAC Trophy	W 70–65	16–5 (6–4)	McGuirk Arena (5,350); Mount Pleasant, MI
02/10/2015; 7:00 pm		at Ohio	W 68–57	17–5 (7–4)	Convocation Center (6,226); Athens, OH
02/14/2015; 2:00 pm, ESPN3		at Buffalo	W 75–74	18–5 (8–4)	Alumni Arena (3,284); Amherst, NY
02/18/2015; 7:00 pm, ESPN3		Northern Illinois	W 68–66	19–5 (9–4)	McGuirk Arena (2,524); Mount Pleasant, MI
02/21/2015; 4:30 pm, ESPN3		Ball State	W 83–60	20–5 (10–4)	McGuirk Arena (4,008); Mount Pleasant, MI
02/24/2015; 7:30 pm		at Eastern Michigan; Michigan MAC Trophy	W 72–56	21–5 (11–4)	Convocation Center (731); Ypsilanti, MI
02/28/2015; 8:00 pm, ESPN3		at Northern Illinois	L 55–72	21–6 (11–5)	Convocation Center (1,548); DeKalb, IL
03/03/2015; 7:00 pm, ESPN3		Toledo	W 83–75	22–6 (12–5)	McGuirk Arena (3,793); Mount Pleasant, MI
03/06/2015; 7:00 pm		at Western Michigan; Michigan MAC Trophy	L 62–74	22–7 (12–6)	University Arena (4,239); Kalamazoo, MI
MAC tournament
03/13/2015; 6:30 pm, ESPN3		vs. Toledo; Semifinals	W 75–66	23–7	Quicken Loans Arena (6,027); Cleveland, OH
03/14/2015; 7:30 pm, ESPN2		vs. Buffalo; Championship game	L 84–89	23–8	Quicken Loans Arena (5,266); Cleveland, OH
NIT
03/17/2015*; 7:30 pm, ESPN3	No. (6)	at (3) Louisiana Tech; First round	L 79–89	23–9	Thomas Assembly Center (6,904); Ruston, LA
*Non-conference game. ^{#}Rankings from AP Poll. (#) Tournament seedings in parentheses. All times are in Eastern. (#) during NIT is seed within region.
