= 2014–15 Eastern Michigan Eagles men's basketball team =

American college basketball season

2014–15 Eastern Michigan Eagles men's basketball

EMU Showcase

CBI, First round
- Conference: Mid-American Conference
- West Division
- Record: 21–14 (8–10 MAC)
- Head coach: Rob Murphy (4th season)
- Assistant coaches: Mike Brown; Kevin Mondro; Benny White
- Home arena: Convocation Center

2014–15 Mid-American Conference men's basketball standings
	Conf.				Overall
Team	W		L	PCT	W		L	PCT
East
Buffalo †	12	–	6	.667	23	–	10	.697
Kent State	12	–	6	.667	23	–	12	.657
Bowling Green	11	–	7	.611	21	–	12	.636
Akron	9	–	9	.500	21	–	14	.600
Miami	8	–	10	.444	13	–	19	.406
Ohio	5	–	13	.278	10	–	20	.333
West
Central Michigan	12	–	6	.667	23	–	9	.719
Toledo	11	–	7	.611	20	–	13	.606
Western Michigan	10	–	8	.556	20	–	14	.588
Eastern Michigan	8	–	10	.444	21	–	14	.600
Northern Illinois	8	–	10	.444	14	–	16	.467
Ball State	2	–	16	.111	7	–	23	.233
† 2015 MAC tournament winner

The 2014–15 Eastern Michigan Eagles men's basketball team represented Eastern Michigan University during the 2014–15 NCAA Division I men's basketball season. The Eagles, led by fourth year head coach Rob Murphy, played their home games at the Eastern Michigan University Convocation Center, as members of the West Division of the Mid-American Conference. They finished the season 21–14, 8–10 in MAC play to finish in a tie for fourth place in the West Division. They advanced to the quarterfinals of the MAC tournament where they lost to Toledo. They were invited to the College Basketball Invitational where they lost in the first round to Louisiana–Monroe.

== Roster additions ==
- SF Brandon Nazione from Des Moines Area Community College to EMU where he was a Division II Second-Team All-American.
- Jerome Hunter from Alabama A&M
- Anali Okoloji from George Mason.
- PF Jordan Nobles (Canton HS)
- PG Ethan Alvano (Corona HS)
- SG Tim Bond (Baltimore City College HS)
- PF Tristan Wilson (Skyline HS).
- Matt Cline joined the EMU basketball staff as the Director of Men's Basketball Operations in 2014.

Two players transferred away from EMU after the 2013/14 season, Jalen Ross will be going to Hartford & Darrell Combs to IUPUI. Former EMU standout and NBA player Carl Thomas was hired by Jackson College as Head Coach of the men's basketball team.

== Preseason accolades ==
Senior forward Karrington Ward was named the 15th-best defensive player in the country according to BleacherReport.com.

== Roster ==
#	Player	Position	Height	Weight	Year	Hometown
0	Raven Lee	G	6–3	180	R–SO	Detroit, MI
1	Mike Talley	G	6–0	176	R–SR	Detroit, MI
3	Anali Okoloji	F	6–8	232	R–SR	Brooklyn, NY
4	Brandon Nazione	F	6–8	215	JR	Howell, MI
5	Jodan Price	G/F	6–7	180	R–SO	Indianapolis, IN
10	Tim Bond	G	6–6	170	FR	Baltimore, MD
12	Olalekan Ajayi	F/C	6–11	245	JR	Winston-Salem, NC
13	Trent Perry	G	6–4	175	R–FR	Franklin, TN
14	Karrington Ward	F	6–7	186	SR	Lockport, IL
15	Jordan Nobles	F	6–9	190	FR	Canton, MI
20	Ali Farhat	G	6–0	160	SO	Dearborn, MI
21	Jerome Hunter	F	6–9	250	GR	Buffalo, NY
22	Jordan Martin	G	6–3	195	R–JR	Detroit, MI
25	Ethan Alvano	G	6–1	170	FR	Corona, CA
30	Mike Samuels	C	6–11	285	R–JR	Bushkill, Pennsylvania

== Schedule ==
Date time, TV	Opponent	Result	Record	Site (attendance) city, state
Regular season
11/14/2014*; 1:00 pm	St. Francis (IL); EMU Showcase	W 64–52	1–0	Convocation Center (2,859); Ypsilanti, MI
11/17/2014*; 7:00 pm	Oakland	W 89–77	2–0	Convocation Center (863); Ypsilanti, MI
11/21/2014*; 7:00 pm	Youngstown State; EMU Showcase	W 71–62	3–0	Convocation Center (680); Ypsilanti, MI
11/22/2014*; 7:00 pm	UNC Greensboro; EMU Showcase	W 70–62	4–0	Convocation Center (624); Ypsilanti, MI
11/23/2014*; 2:30 pm	Longwood; EMU Showcase	W 79–48	5–0	Convocation Center (395); Ypsilanti, MI
11/26/2014*; 12:00 pm	Rochester (MI)	W 68–35	6–0	Convocation Center (192); Ypsilanti, MI
12/01/2014*; 7:00 pm	Marygrove	W 83–52	7–0	Convocation Center (272); Ypsilanti, MI
12/06/2014*; 2:00 pm, FSOH	at Dayton	L 64–73	7–1	UD Arena (12,243); Dayton, OH
12/09/2014*; 9:00 pm, ESPNU	at Michigan	W 45–42	8–1	Crisler Center (11,926); Ann Arbor, MI
12/17/2014*; 9:00 pm, BTN	at No. 25 Michigan State	L 46–66	8–2	Breslin Center (14,797); East Lansing, MI
12/20/2014*; 3:00 pm	at Missouri State	W 77–65	9–2	JQH Arena (5,013); Springfield, MO
12/23/2014*; 6:00 pm	Coppin State	W 87–64	10–2	Convocation Center (827); Ypsilanti, MI
12/28/2014*; 1:00 pm	Concordia (MI)	W 100–42	11–2	Convocation Center (564); Ypsilanti, MI
01/07/2015; 7:00 pm	Ball State	L 59–60 ^{OT}	11–3 (0–1)	Convocation Center (1,036); Ypsilanti, MI
01/10/2015; 5:30 pm	at Miami (OH)	L 81–82 ^{OT}	11–4 (0–2)	Millett Hall (987); Oxford, OH
01/14/2015; 7:00 pm	at Kent State	L 59–65	11–5 (0–3)	MAC Center (2,892); Kent, OH
01/17/2015; 12:00 pm, ESPN3	Northern Illinois	W 54–46	12–5 (1–3)	Convocation Center (786); Ypsilanti, MI
01/21/2015; 7:00 pm, ESPN3	at Bowling Green	L 58–74	12–6 (1–4)	Stroh Center (2,314); Bowling Green, OH
01/24/2015; 4:30 pm, ESPN3	at Central Michigan; Michigan MAC Trophy	L 51–65	12–7 (1–5)	McGuirk Arena (4,041); Mount Pleasant, MI
01/27/2015; 7:00 pm	Ohio	W 76–40	13–7 (2–5)	Convocation Center (837); Ypsilanti, MI
01/31/2015; 12:00 pm	Western Michigan; Michigan MAC Trophy	W 69–63	14–7 (3–5)	Convocation Center (1,018); Ypsilanti, MI
02/04/2015; 7:00 pm, ESPN3	at Toledo	L 60–84	14–8 (3–6)	Savage Arena (4,532); Toledo, OH
02/07/2015; 2:00 pm	at Ohio	L 73–76	14–9 (3–7)	Convocation Center (9,586); Athens, OH
02/10/2015; 7:00 pm	Miami (OH)	W 83–69	15–9 (4–7)	Convocation Center (460); Ypsilanti, MI
02/14/2015; 2:30 pm	Akron	W 78–75	16–9 (5–7)	Convocation Center (1,101); Ypsilanti, MI
02/18/2015; 7:00 pm	Buffalo	L 63–78	16–10 (5–8)	Convocation Center (739); Ypsilanti, MI
02/21/2015; 8:00 pm, ESPN3	at Northern Illinois	W 73–65	17–10 (6–8)	Convocation Center (2,302); DeKalb, IL
02/24/2015; 7:00 pm	Central Michigan; Michigan MAC Trophy	L 56–72	17–11 (6–9)	Convocation Center (731); Ypsilanti, MI
02/28/2015; 4:30 pm	at Western Michigan; Michigan MAC Trophy	L 72–80	17–12 (6–10)	University Arena (3,188); Kalamazoo, MI
03/03/2015; 7:00 pm, ESPN3	at Ball State	W 67–60	18–12 (7–10)	John E. Worthen Arena (2,295); Muncie, IN
03/06/2015; 7:00 pm	Toledo	W 85–59	19–12 (8–10)	Convocation Center (1,494); Ypsilanti, MI
MAC tournament
03/09/2015; 7:30 pm	Miami (OH); First round	W 62–61 ^{OT}	20–12	Convocation Center (827); Ypsilanti, MI
03/11/2015; 6:30 pm, ESPN3	vs. Bowling Green; Second round	W 73–67	21–12	Quicken Loans Arena (2,411); Cleveland, OH
03/12/2015; 6:30 pm, ESPN3	vs. Toledo; Quarterfinals	L 67–78	21–13	Quicken Loans Arena (4,502); Cleveland, OH
College Basketball Invitational
03/18/2015*; 8:00 pm	at Louisiana–Monroe; First round	L 67–71	21–14	Fant–Ewing Coliseum (3,003); Monroe, LA
*Non-conference game. ^{#}Rankings from AP Poll. (#) Tournament seedings in parentheses. All times are in Eastern Time.

== MAC Leaders ==
INDIVIDUAL PLAYER GAME HIGHS

- Free throw percentage
  - Mike Talley- 1.000 (9-9)(at Ball State (3/3/15)
  - Raven Lee- 1.000(8-8) vs Bowling Green (3/11/15)
- Steals
  - Raven Lee- 6 vs Coppin State (12/23/14)
  - Mike Talley- 6 at Ball State (3/3/15)
- Blocked Shots
  - Karrington Ward 6 vs Coppin State (12/23/14)
- Turnovers
  - Raven Lee- 8 vs Akron (02/14/15)

Team Highs

- Margin
  - 58 (100–42) vs Concordia (12/28/14)
- Rebounds
  - 59 vs Marygrove (12/01/14)
- Steals
  - 17 vs Longwood (11/23/14)
- Blocked Shots
  - 10 vs Coppin State (12/23/14)
  - 10 vs Ball State (1/07/15)

Opponent Lows

- Points
  - 35 vs Rochester (11/26/14)
- Field Goals Made
  - 11 vs Rochester (11/26/14)
  - 13 vs Ohio (01/27/15)
- Field Goal Attempts
  - 39 at Northern Illinois (02/21/15)
- Field Goal Percentage
  - .224 vs Rochester (11/26/14)
  - .228 vs Ohio (01/27/15)
- Free Throws Made
  - 1 vs Saint Francis (11/14/14)
- Free Throws Attempted
  - 2 vs Saint Francis (11/14/14)
- Fouls
  - 9 vs Ohio (01/27/15)

MAC Statistic Leaders

- Field Goal Pct Defense- .401
- Steals- 8.9

MAC Player of the Week

- Nov. 24, 2014 Raven Lee
- Feb. 16, 2015 Karrington Ward
- Mar. 07, 2015 Mike Talley

Academic All MAC

- Olalekan Ajayi
- Trent Perry

3rd Team All-MAC

- 2015 Raven Lee

MAC Honorable Mention

- 2015 Karrington Ward
