= 2014–15 Akron Zips men's basketball team =

American college basketball season

2014–15 Akron Zips men's basketball
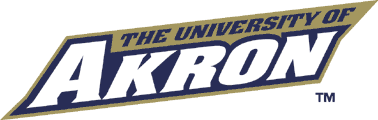
- Conference: Mid-American Conference
- East Division
- Record: 21–14 (9–9 MAC)
- Head coach: Keith Dambrot (11th season)
- Assistant coaches: Rick McFadden; Charles Thomas; Terry Weigand
- Home arena: James A. Rhodes Arena

2014–15 Mid-American Conference men's basketball standings
	Conf.				Overall
Team	W		L	PCT	W		L	PCT
East
Buffalo †	12	–	6	.667	23	–	10	.697
Kent State	12	–	6	.667	23	–	12	.657
Bowling Green	11	–	7	.611	21	–	12	.636
Akron	9	–	9	.500	21	–	14	.600
Miami	8	–	10	.444	13	–	19	.406
Ohio	5	–	13	.278	10	–	20	.333
West
Central Michigan	12	–	6	.667	23	–	9	.719
Toledo	11	–	7	.611	20	–	13	.606
Western Michigan	10	–	8	.556	20	–	14	.588
Eastern Michigan	8	–	10	.444	21	–	14	.600
Northern Illinois	8	–	10	.444	14	–	16	.467
Ball State	2	–	16	.111	7	–	23	.233
† 2015 MAC tournament winner

The 2014–15 Akron Zips men's basketball team represented the University of Akron during the 2014–15 NCAA Division I men's basketball season. The Zips, led by 11th year head coach Keith Dambrot, played their home games at the James A. Rhodes Arena as members of the East Division of the Mid-American Conference. They finished the season 21–14, 9–9 in MAC play to finish in fourth place in the East Division. They advanced to the semifinals of the MAC tournament where they lost to Buffalo. Despite having 21 wins, they were not invited to a postseason tournament.

== Previous season ==
The Zips finished the season 21–13, 12–6 in MAC play to finish in second place in the East Division. They advanced to the semifinals of the MAC tournament where they lost to Western Michigan. They were invited to the CollegeInsider.com Tournament where they lost in the first round to IPFW.

== Off season ==
=== Departures ===
Name	Number	Pos.	Height	Weight	Year	Hometown	Notes
Nick Harney	10	F	6'8"	210	Senior	Cleveland, OH	Graduated
Carmelo Betancourt	12	G	5'11"	182	Sophomore	Río Piedras, PR	Transferred
Quincy Diggs	13	F	6'6"	209	Senior	Dallas, TX	Graduated
Darius Hoisten	30	G	6'5"	180	Sophomore	Akron, OH	Transferred to Georgia Southwestern

== Recruiting class of 2014 ==
College recruiting information
Name	Hometown	School	Height	Weight	Commit date
Noah Robotham; G	Las Vegas, NV	Bishop Gorman High School	5 ft 11 in (1.80 m)	165 lb (75 kg)	May 19, 2014
Noah Robotham; G	Recruit ratings: Scout: Rivals: (67)				
Luke Meyer; PF	Addison, MI	Addison High School	6 ft 10 in (2.08 m)	205 lb (93 kg)	Dec 2, 2014
Luke Meyer; PF	Recruit ratings: Scout: Rivals: (NR)				
Jimond Ivey; G	Cleveland, OH	Glenville High School	6 ft 3 in (1.91 m)	N/A	Feb 15, 2014
Jimond Ivey; G	Recruit ratings: Scout: Rivals: (NR)				
Antino Jackson; G	Houston, TX	Cypress Springs High School	5 ft 10 in (1.78 m)	155 lb (70 kg)	Apr 13, 2014
Antino Jackson; G	Recruit ratings: Scout: Rivals: (NR)				
Overall recruit ranking:
Note: In many cases, Scout, Rivals, 247Sports, On3, and ESPN may conflict in their listings of height and weight.; In these cases, the average was taken. ESPN grades are on a 100-point scale.; Sources: "2014 Team Ranking". Rivals.

=== Recruiting class of 2015 ===
College recruiting information
Name	Hometown	School	Height	Weight	Commit date
Josh Williams; SG	Akron, OH	St. Vincent-St. Mary High School	6 ft 2 in (1.88 m)	175 lb (79 kg)	Aug 7, 2013
Josh Williams; SG	Recruit ratings: Scout: Rivals: (77)				
Peter Agba; PF	Greensboro, NC	Greensboro Day School	6 ft 6 in (1.98 m)	N/A	Sep 22, 2014
Peter Agba; PF	Recruit ratings: Scout: Rivals: (NR)				
Overall recruit ranking:
Note: In many cases, Scout, Rivals, 247Sports, On3, and ESPN may conflict in their listings of height and weight.; In these cases, the average was taken. ESPN grades are on a 100-point scale.; Sources: "2015 Team Ranking". Rivals.

== Roster ==
2014–15 Akron Zips men's basketball team
Players
Coaches

Pos.	#	Name	Height	Weight	Year	Previous school	Hometown
F	1	Demetrius Treadwell	6 ft 7 in (2.01 m)	236 lb (107 kg)	Sr	Euclid HS	Euclid, OH
F	2	Kwan Cheatham	6 ft 9 in (2.06 m)	230 lb (104 kg)	So	Winton Woods HS	Cincinnati, OH
G	3	Nyles Evans	5 ft 11 in (1.8 m)	160 lb (73 kg)	Sr	Hoover HS; Brevard CC	North Canton, OH
G	4	Deji Ibitayo	6 ft 4 in (1.93 m)	200 lb (91 kg)	Sr	Rich Central HS	Chicago, IL
G/F	5	B. J. Gladden	6 ft 6 in (1.98 m)	214 lb (97 kg)	So	Olympic HS	Charlotte, NC
G	11	Aaron Jackson	6 ft 8 in (2.03 m)	215 lb (98 kg)	RS Fr	Lincoln HS	Gahanna, OH
G	14	Noah Robotham	6 ft 1 in (1.85 m)	165 lb (75 kg)	Fr	Bishop Gorman	Las Vegas, NV
G/F	15	Jake Kretzer	6 ft 7 in (2.01 m)	216 lb (98 kg)	Jr	Waverly HS	Bainbridge, OH
F	21	Reggie McAdams	6 ft 7 in (2.01 m)	208 lb (94 kg)	Jr	Elida HS	Elida, OH
C	23	Isaiah Johnson	6 ft 10 in (2.08 m)	290 lb (132 kg)	So	Walnut Hills HS	Cincinnati, OH
C	34	Pat Forsythe	6 ft 11 in (2.11 m)	245 lb (111 kg)	RS Jr	Brunswick HS; West Virginia	Brunswick, OH
G	55	Antino Jackson	5 ft 11 in (1.8 m)	160 lb (73 kg)	Fr	Cypress Springs HS	Houston, TX

Head coach

- Keith Dambrot (Akron)

Assistant coach(es)

- Rick McFadden (Akron)
- Charles Thomas (Eastern Michigan)
- Terry Weigand (Ashland)

Legend

- (C) Team captain
- (S) Suspended
- (I) Ineligible
- (W) Walk-on
- Injured
- Current redshirt

Roster

== Schedule and results ==
Date time, TV	Rank^{#}	Opponent^{#}	Result	Record	Site (attendance) city, state
Exhibition
11/10/2014*; 7:00 pm		Rochester College	W 55–42		James A. Rhodes Arena (2,899); Akron, OH
Non-conference games
11/14/2014*; 8:00 pm		UMBC	W 74–57	1–0	James A. Rhodes Arena (3,039); Akron, OH
11/20/2014*; 12:30 pm, ESPN3		vs. USC; Charleston Classic quarterfinals	W 66–46	2–0	TD Arena (1,131); Charleston, SC
11/21/2014*; 2:30 pm, ESPNU		vs. Miami (FL); Charleston Classic semifinals	L 51–79	2–1	TD Arena (855); Charleston, SC
11/23/2014*; 6:30 pm, ESPNU		vs. South Carolina; Charleston Classic 3rd place game	W 68–63	3–1	TD Arena (1,523); Charleston, SC
11/25/2014*; 7:30 pm, ESPN3		at Penn State	L 72–78	3–2	Bryce Jordan Center (6,703); University Park, PA
11/30/2014*; 5:00 pm		Bryant	W 72–66	4–2	James A. Rhodes Arena (2,486); Akron, OH
12/02/2014*; 7:00 pm		Arkansas–Pine Bluff	W 81–60	5–2	James A. Rhodes Arena (2,378); Akron, OH
12/04/2014*; 7:00 pm		Western Illinois	W 73–49	6–2	James A. Rhodes Arena (2,523); Akron, OH
12/13/2014*; 7:00 pm		Middle Tennessee	L 61–62	6–3	James A. Rhodes Arena (2,714); Akron, OH
12/16/2014*; 8:00 pm		at North Dakota State	L 46–55	6–4	Scheels Arena (1,129); Fargo, ND
12/20/2014*; 7:00 pm		Bluffton	W 92–53	7–4	James A. Rhodes Arena (3,156); Akron, OH
12/30/2014*; 7:00 pm		Marshall	W 70–63	8–4	James A. Rhodes Arena (2,937); Akron, OH
01/03/2015*; 7:00 pm		Coppin State	W 79–62	9–4	James A. Rhodes Arena (2,907); Akron, OH
Conference games
01/06/2015; 7:00 pm		Western Michigan	W 72–52	10–4 (1–0)	James A. Rhodes Arena (2,741); Akron, OH
01/09/2015; 7:00 pm, ESPNU		at Toledo	L 67–84	10–5 (1–1)	Savage Arena (5,509); Toledo, OH
01/14/2015; 7:00 pm		Bowling Green	W 67–50	11–5 (2–1)	James A. Rhodes Arena (3,313); Akron, OH
01/17/2015; 7:00 pm		Central Michigan	W 82–76	12–5 (3–1)	James A. Rhodes Arena (3,513); Akron, OH
01/21/2015; 8:00 pm		at Northern Illinois	L 61–64	12–6 (3–2)	Convocation Center (957); DeKalb, IL
01/24/2015; 2:00 pm		at Western Michigan	W 71–69	13–6 (4–2)	University Arena (3,837); Kalamazoo, MI
01/27/2015; 7:00 pm		Ball State	W 59–47	14–6 (5–2)	James A. Rhodes Arena (3,375); Akron, OH
01/31/2015; 7:00 pm		at Bowling Green	W 69–68	15–6 (6–2)	Stroh Center (2,624); Bowling Green, OH
02/04/2015; 7:00 pm, ESPN3		at Ohio	L 82–83	15–7 (6–3)	Convocation Center (7,640); Athens, OH
02/07/2015; 7:00 pm, ESPN3		Buffalo	W 75–72	16–7 (7–3)	James A. Rhodes Arena (3,570); Akron, OH
02/10/2015; 7:00 pm, ESPN3		Kent State; PNC Wagon Wheel Challenge	W 61–52	17–7 (8–3)	James A. Rhodes Arena (4,836); Akron, OH
02/14/2015; 2:30 pm		at Eastern Michigan	L 75–78	17–8 (8–4)	Convocation Center (1,101); Ypsilanti, MI
02/18/2015; 7:00 pm, ESPN3		Toledo	L 66–68	17–9 (8–5)	James A. Rhodes Arena (3,351); Akron, OH
02/21/2015; 7:30 pm		Miami (OH)	L 52–57	17–10 (8–6)	James A. Rhodes Arena (4,700); Akron, OH
02/24/2015; 7:00 pm, ESPN3		at Buffalo	L 62–67	17–11 (8–7)	Alumni Arena (3,541); Buffalo, NY
02/27/2015; 8:00 pm, ESPNU		Ohio	W 70–58	18–11 (9–7)	James A. Rhodes Arena (3,676); Akron, OH
03/03/2015; 7:00 pm		at Miami (OH)	L 63–70	18–12 (9–8)	Millett Hall (1,269); Oxford, OH
03/06/2015; 7:00 pm, ESPN2		at Kent State; PNC Wagon Wheel Challenge	L 77–79	18–13 (9–9)	MAC Center (6,327); Kent, OH
MAC tournament
03/09/2015; 7:00 pm		Northern Illinois; First round	W 76–52	19–13	James A. Rhodes Arena (2,631); Akron, OH
03/11/2015; 9:00 pm, TWCSC		vs. Western Michigan; Second round	W 58–45	20–13	Quicken Loans Arena (2,411); Cleveland, OH
03/12/2015; 9:00 pm, TWCSC		vs. Kent State; Quarterfinals	W 53–51	21–13	Quicken Loans Arena (4,502); Cleveland, OH
03/13/2015; 9:00 pm, TWCSC		vs. Buffalo; Semifinals	L 59–68	21–14	Quicken Loans Arena (6,027); Cleveland, OH
*Non-conference game. ^{#}Rankings from AP Poll. (#) Tournament seedings in parentheses. All times are in Eastern.
