= 2015 MAC men's basketball tournament =

- Classification: Division I
- Season: 2014–15
- Teams: 12
- First round site: Campus sites
- Quarterfinals site: Quicken Loans Arena; Cleveland, Ohio
- Semifinals site: Quicken Loans Arena; Cleveland, Ohio
- Finals site: Quicken Loans Arena; Cleveland, Ohio
- Champions: Buffalo (1st title)
- Winning coach: Bobby Hurley (1st title)
- MVP: Xavier Ford (Buffalo)
- Television: TWCSC (Ohio), ESPN2
- MAC men's basketball tournaments

2014–15 Mid-American Conference men's basketball standings
	Conf.				Overall
Team	W		L	PCT	W		L	PCT
East
Buffalo †	12	–	6	.667	23	–	10	.697
Kent State	12	–	6	.667	23	–	12	.657
Bowling Green	11	–	7	.611	21	–	12	.636
Akron	9	–	9	.500	21	–	14	.600
Miami	8	–	10	.444	13	–	19	.406
Ohio	5	–	13	.278	10	–	20	.333
West
Central Michigan	12	–	6	.667	23	–	9	.719
Toledo	11	–	7	.611	20	–	13	.606
Western Michigan	10	–	8	.556	20	–	14	.588
Eastern Michigan	8	–	10	.444	21	–	14	.600
Northern Illinois	8	–	10	.444	14	–	16	.467
Ball State	2	–	16	.111	7	–	23	.233
† 2015 MAC tournament winner

The 2015 Mid-American Conference men's basketball tournament was a post-season men's basketball tournament for the Mid-American Conference (MAC) 2014–15 college basketball season. Tournament first-round games were held on campus sites at the higher seed on March 9. The remaining rounds were held at Quicken Loans Arena in Cleveland between March 11–14. University at Buffalo won the tournament and received the conference's automatic bid into the 2015 NCAA tournament.

== Format ==
As with the recent tournaments, the top two seeds receive byes into the semifinals, with the three and four seeds receiving a bye to the quarterfinals.

== Seeds ==
Seed	School	Conference record	Division	Tiebreaker	Notes
1	Central Michigan	12–6	West	2–1 vs. Buffalo, Kent State	Bye to semifinals
2	Buffalo	12–6	East	2–2 vs. CMU, Kent State	Bye to semifinals
3	Kent State	12–6	East	1–2 vs. CMU, Buffalo	Bye to quarterfinals
4	Toledo	11–7	West	1–0 vs. Bowling Green	Bye to quarterfinals
5	Bowling Green	11–7	East	0–1 vs. Toledo	
6	Western Michigan	10–8	West		
7	Akron	9–9	East		
8	Eastern Michigan	8–10	West	3–1 vs. Miami, NIU	
9	Miami	8–10	East	2–2 vs. EMU, NIU	
10	Northern Illinois	8–10	West	1–3 vs. EMU, Miami	
11	Ohio	5–13	East		
12	Ball State	2–16	West		

== Schedule ==
Game	Time*	Matchup^{#}	Television
First round – Monday, March 9
1		#12 Ball State Cardinals 75 at #5 Bowling Green Falcons 88	BCSN
2		#9 Miami Redhawks 61 at #8 Eastern Michigan Eagles 62	
3		#11 Ohio Bobcats 74 at #6 Western Michigan Broncos 82	
4		#10 Northern Illinois Huskies 52 at #7 Akron Zips 76	
Second round – Wednesday, March 11
5	6:30 pm	#8 Eastern Michigan Eagles 73 vs. #5 Bowling Green Falcons 67	TWCSC (Ohio)
6	9:00 pm	#7 Akron Zips 58 vs. #6 Western Michigan Broncos 45	TWCSC (Ohio)
Quarterfinals – Thursday, March 12
7	6:30 pm	#8 Eastern Michigan Eagles 67 vs. #4 Toledo Rockets 78	TWCSC (Ohio)
8	9:00 pm	#7 Akron Zips 53 vs. #3 Kent State Golden Flashes 51	TWCSC (Ohio)
Semifinals – Friday, March 13
9	6:30 pm	#4 Toledo Rockets 66 vs. #1 Central Michigan Chippewas 75	TWCSC (Ohio)
10	9:00 pm	#7 Akron Zips 59 vs. #2 Buffalo Bulls 68	TWCSC (Ohio)
Championship – Saturday, March 14
11	7:30 pm	#2 Buffalo Bulls 89 vs. #1 Central Michigan Chippewas 84	ESPN2
* Game times in ET. # Rankings denote tournament seed

== Bracket ==
First round Monday, March 9, 2014
12	Ball State	75
5	Bowling Green	88
9	Miami (OH)	61
8	Eastern Michigan	62*
11	Ohio	74
6	Western Michigan	82
10	Northern Illinois	52
7	Akron	76

Second round Wednesday, March 11, 2014; TWCSC (Ohio)
5	Bowling Green	67
8	Eastern Michigan	73
6	Western Michigan	45
7	Akron	58

Quarterfinals; Thursday, Match 12, 2014; TWCSC
4	Toledo	78
8	Eastern Michigan	67
3	Kent State	51
7	Akron	53

Semifinals; Friday, March 13, 2014; TWCSC
1	Central Michigan	75
4	Toledo	66
2	Buffalo	68
7	Akron	59

Championship Game; Saturday, March 14, 2014; ESPN2
1	Central Michigan	84
2	Buffalo	89

== All-Tournament Team ==
Tournament MVP – Xavier Ford, Buffalo

Player	Team
J.D. Weatherspoon	Toledo
Xavier Ford	Buffalo
Shannon Evans	Buffalo
John Simons	Central Michigan
Braylon Rayson	Central Michigan
