= James Whitford =

American basketball coach

Current position
- Title: Associate Head Coach
- Team: Rhode Island
- Conference: Atlantic 10

Biographical details
- Born: July 23, 1971 (age 55)
- Education: Wisconsin (1994)

Coaching career (HC unless noted)
- 1997–2005: Miami (OH) (assistant)
- 2005–2009: Xavier (assistant)
- 2009–2011: Arizona (assistant)
- 2011–2013: Arizona (associate HC)
- 2013–2022: Ball State
- 2024–present: Rhode Island (associate HC)

Head coaching record
- Overall: 131–148

Accomplishments and honors

Championships
- 3 MAC West Division (2016, 2017, 2020)

James Bryce Whitford (born July 23, 1971) is an American college basketball assistant coach for the Rhode Island Rams men's basketball program and the former head coach of the Ball State Cardinals men's basketball program. Before he was hired at Ball State, Whitford served as an assistant coach at Miami (Ohio), Xavier, and Arizona where he was instrumental to those teams reaching the Elite Eight and Sweet Sixteen. Amongst peers, Whitford is known for his predictive analytics, work ethic, defensive schemes, recruiting and relationship building. Whitford is married to Alexa Teare, Founder and CEO of a health-tech startup. He has two sons with his former wife.

== Coaching career ==
While enrolled at the University of Wisconsin–Madison Whitford spent three seasons as a student manager for the Badgers men's basketball team. He graduated with a bachelor's degree in political science in 1994.

Whitford's first professional coaching experience was with the Miami RedHawks men's basketball program. Starting as an administrative assistant 1994, he became an assistant coach in 1997 and advanced to top assistant in 1998.

In 2005 Whitford left Miami for Xavier, where he spent four seasons under head coach Sean Miller before following Miller to Arizona in April 2009. After his first two seasons at Arizona Whitford was promoted to associate head coach, a position he held for another two years before taking the head coaching position at Ball State in April 2013. On March 14, 2022, Ball State fired Whitford after nine years as head coach.

In 2024, Whitford joined Miller's brother Archie's coaching staff at Rhode Island as an assistant coach. Whitford and Archie Miller had previously served as assistant coaches together at Arizona.

== Head coaching record ==
Record table
Season	Team	Overall	Conference	Standing	Postseason
Ball State Cardinals (Mid-American Conference) (2013–2022)
2013–14	Ball State	5–25	2–16	6th (West)	
2014–15	Ball State	7–23	2–16	6th (West)	
2015–16	Ball State	21–14	10–8	T–1st (West)	CIT Quarterfinals
2016–17	Ball State	21–13	11–7	T–1st (West)	CIT First Round
2017–18	Ball State	19–13	10–8	3rd (West)	
2018–19	Ball State	16–17	6–12	5th (West)	
2019–20	Ball State	18–13	11–7	T–1st (West)	
2020–21	Ball State	10–13	8–9	8th	
2021–22	Ball State	14–17	9–10	6th	
Ball State:		131–148 (.470)	69–93 (.426)		
Total:		131–148 (.470)			
National champion Postseason invitational champion Conference regular season champion Conference regular season and conference tournament champion Division regular season champion Division regular season and conference tournament champion Conference tournament champion
