= 2014–15 Ohio Bobcats men's basketball team =

American college basketball season

2014–15 Ohio Bobcats men's basketball
- Conference: Mid-American Conference
- East Division
- Record: 10–20 (5–13 MAC)
- Head coach: Saul Phillips (1st season)
- Assistant coaches: Will Ryan; Jason Kemp; Aaron Fuss
- Home arena: Convocation Center

2014–15 Mid-American Conference men's basketball standings
	Conf.				Overall
Team	W		L	PCT	W		L	PCT
East
Buffalo †	12	–	6	.667	23	–	10	.697
Kent State	12	–	6	.667	23	–	12	.657
Bowling Green	11	–	7	.611	21	–	12	.636
Akron	9	–	9	.500	21	–	14	.600
Miami	8	–	10	.444	13	–	19	.406
Ohio	5	–	13	.278	10	–	20	.333
West
Central Michigan	12	–	6	.667	23	–	9	.719
Toledo	11	–	7	.611	20	–	13	.606
Western Michigan	10	–	8	.556	20	–	14	.588
Eastern Michigan	8	–	10	.444	21	–	14	.600
Northern Illinois	8	–	10	.444	14	–	16	.467
Ball State	2	–	16	.111	7	–	23	.233
† 2015 MAC tournament winner

The 2014–15 Ohio Bobcats men's basketball team represented Ohio University during the 2014–15 NCAA Division I men's basketball season. It was the first year for Saul Phillips as head coach for the program. The team played its home games at the Convocation Center in Athens, Ohio as a member of the Mid-American Conference. They finished the season 10–20, 5–13 in MAC play to finish in last place in the East Division. They lost in the first round of the MAC tournament to Western Michigan.

== Previous season ==
The Bobcats finished the 2013–14 season 25–12, 11–7 in MAC play to finish in third place in the East Division. They advanced to the quarterfinals of the MAC tournament where they lost to Akron. They were invited to the CollegeInsider.com Tournament(CIT) where they defeated Cleveland State and Wright State to advance to the quarterfinals where they lost to VMI.

== Off season ==
Jim Christian resigned from Ohio to coach for the Boston College Eagles on April 3, 2014. Ohio University Director of Athletics Jim Schaus introduced Saul Phillips as the new head coach for the Bobcats three days later on April 6, 2014.

Phillips announced on May 7, 2014 that the coaching staff will include former NDSU assistants Will Ryan and Jason Kemp. Aaron Fuss(assistant under former head coach Christian) will remain with the Bobcats as an assistant under Phillips as well.

Freshman Jaaron Simmons transferred from the University of Houston. Because of NCAA transfer rules, Simmons will be forced to sit out the 2014–15 season but will have 3 years of eligibility starting the following season.

=== Departures ===
Departures
Name	Number	Pos.	Height	Weight	Year	Hometown	Reason
T.J. Hall	13	G/F	6'6"	210	Senior	Gainesville, FL	Graduated
Nick Kellogg	15	G	6'3"	198	Senior	Westerville, OH	Graduated
Ricardo Johnson	20	G/F	6'5"	207	Senior	Covington, KY	Graduated
Travis Wilkins	24	G	6'4"	192	Senior	Springfield, MO	Graduated
Jon Smith	21	F	6'7"	189	RS Senior	Grove City, OH	Graduated

=== Recruits ===
College recruiting information
Name	Hometown	School	Height	Weight	Commit date
Kendall Crute; PG	Kennesaw, GA	North Cobb Christian School	6 ft 2 in (1.88 m)	180 lb (82 kg)	Nov 26, 2013
Kendall Crute; PG	Recruit ratings: Scout: Rivals: 247Sports: (69)				
Michael Laster; SG	Detroit, MI	Cass Technical High School	6 ft 4 in (1.93 m)	N/A	May 3, 2014
Michael Laster; SG	Recruit ratings: (NR)				
Overall recruit ranking:
Note: In many cases, Scout, Rivals, 247Sports, On3, and ESPN may conflict in their listings of height and weight.; In these cases, the average was taken. ESPN grades are on a 100-point scale.; Sources: "Ohio Basketball Commitment List". Rivals.; "2014 Ohio Basketball Commits". Scout.; "ESPN". ESPN.; "Scout.com Team Recruiting Rankings". Scout.; "2014 Team Ranking". Rivals.

== Roster ==
2014–15 Ohio Bobcats men's basketball team
Players
Coaches
}

Pos.	#	Name	Height	Weight	Year	Hometown
F	0	Treg Setty (redshirt)	6 ft 8 in (2.03 m)	194 lb (88 kg)	RS Jr	Maysville, KY
G	1	Kendall Crute	6 ft 3 in (1.91 m)	190 lb (86 kg)	RS Fr	Marietta, GA
G	2	Jaaron Simmons (redshirt)	6 ft 1 in (1.85 m)	175 lb (79 kg)	RS Fr	Dayton, OH
G	3	Javarez Willis (redshirt)	5 ft 11 in (1.8 m)	172 lb (78 kg)	RS Sr	Homer, LA
F	4	Wadly Mompremier	6 ft 10 in (2.08 m)	225 lb (102 kg)	So	Miami, FL
F	5	Maurice Ndour	6 ft 9 in (2.06 m)	200 lb (91 kg)	Sr	Mbour, Senegal
G/F	11	Khari Harley (redshirt)	6 ft 8 in (2.03 m)	175 lb (79 kg)	RS Fr	Egg Harbor Township, NJ
G	12	Drew Crabtree	6 ft 1 in (1.85 m)	190 lb (86 kg)	So	Marysville, OH
G	14	Ryan Taylor	6 ft 1 in (1.85 m)	190 lb (86 kg)	Fr	Gary, IN
G	22	Stevie Taylor	5 ft 10 in (1.78 m)	174 lb (79 kg)	Sr	Gahanna, OH
G	24	Mike Laster	6 ft 4 in (1.93 m)	180 lb (82 kg)	Fr	Detroit, MI
F	33	Antonio Campbell	6 ft 8 in (2.03 m)	260 lb (118 kg)	So	Cincinnati, OH

Head coach

- Saul Phillips (UW–Platteville)

Assistant coach(es)

- Will Ryan (Wisconsin)
- Jason Kemp (UW–La Crosse)
- Aaron Fuss (Ohio State)

Legend

- (C) Team captain
- (S) Suspended
- (I) Ineligible
- (W) Walk-on
- Injured
- Current redshirt

Roster
Last update: July 4, 2014

== Preseason ==
The preseason poll and league awards were announced by the league office on October 28, 2014. Ohio was picked to finish second in the MAC East

=== Preseason men's basketball poll ===
(First place votes in parentheses)

==== East Division ====
1. Akron 117 (17)
2. Ohio (2)
3. Kent State 66
4. Buffalo 58
5. Bowling Green 52 (1)
6. Miami 35

==== West Division ====
1. Toledo 118 (18)
2. Western Michigan 94 (1)
3. Eastern Michigan 68
4. Northern Illinois 63
5. Central Michigan 49 (1)
6. Ball State 28

==== Tournament champs ====
Toledo (15), Akron (1), Bowling Green (1), Central Michigan (1), Ohio (1), Western Michigan (1)

=== Preseason All-MAC ===
Preseason All-MAC teams
Team	Player	Position	Year
Preseason All-MAC East	Maurice Ndour	F	Sr.

== Schedule ==
Date time, TV	Rank^{#}	Opponent^{#}	Result	Record	Site (attendance) city, state
Exhibition
11/08/2014*; 2:00 pm		Marietta	W 82–69		Convocation Center (11,108); Athens, OH
Regular Season
11/15/2014*; 2:00 pm		Appalachian State	W 73–47	1–0	Convocation Center (7,115); Athens, OH
11/19/2014*; 7:00 pm		at Florida Gulf Coast	L 62–79	1–1	Alico Arena (4,633); Fort Myers, FL
11/25/2014*; 7:00 pm		Arkansas–Pine Bluff	W 69–60	2–1	Convocation Center (5,641); Athens, OH
11/29/2014*; 7:00 pm		Belmont	L 81–83	2–2	Convocation Center (5,611); Athens, OH
12/06/2014*; 2:00 pm		St. Bonaventure	L 70–80	2–3	Convocation Center (7,203); Athens, OH
12/13/2014*; 2:00 pm		Alcorn State	W 66–55	3–3	Convocation Center (5,972); Athens, OH
12/18/2014*; 9:05 pm		at Evansville	L 69–81	3–4	Ford Center (3,610); Evansville, IN
12/22/2014*; 2:30 pm, ESPNU		vs. George Washington; Diamond Head Classic quarterfinals	L 49–77	3–5	Stan Sheriff Center (8,297); Honolulu, HI
12/23/2014*; 2:30 pm, ESPNU		vs. Depaul; Diamond Head Classic consolation round	W 99–78	4–5	Stan Sheriff Center (7,875); Honolulu, HI
12/25/2014*; 4:00 pm, ESPNU		vs. Nebraska; Diamond Head Classic fifth place game	L 58–71	4–6	Stan Sheriff Center (5,125); Honolulu, HI
12/30/2014*; 7:00 pm		UNC Wilmington	W 72–53	5–6	Convocation Center (5,864); Athens, OH
MAC regular season
1/07/2015; 7:00 pm		Northern Illinois	L 60–70	5–7 (0–1)	Convocation Center (5,743); Athens, OH
1/10/2015; 4:00 pm		at Bowling Green	L 54–69	5–8 (0–2)	Stroh Center (2,002); Bowling Green
1/14/2015; 7:00 pm		Toledo	L 73–80	5–9 (0–3)	Convocation Center (7,714); Athens, OH
1/17/2015; 7:00 pm		at Kent State	L 59–69	5–10 (0–4)	Memorial Athletic and Convocation Center (5,084); Kent, OH
1/21/2015; 7:00 pm		at Ball State	W 82–73	6–10 (1–4)	John E. Worthen Arena (2,770); Muncie, IN
1/24/2015; 2:00 pm		Buffalo	W 63–61	7–10 (2–4)	Convocation Center (9,124); Athens, OH
1/27/2015; 7:00 pm		at Eastern Michigan	L 40–76	7–11 (2–5)	Convocation Center (837); Ypsilanti, MI
1/31/2015; 4:30 pm, ESPN3		at Central Michigan	L 69–74	7–12 (2–6)	McGuirk Arena (4,403); Mt. Pleasant, MI
2/04/2015; 7:00 pm, ESPN3		Akron	W 83–82	8–12 (3–6)	Convocation Center (7,640); Athens, OH
2/07/2015; 2:00 pm		Eastern Michigan	W 76–73	9–12 (4–6)	Convocation Center (9,586); Athens, OH
2/10/2015; 7:00 pm		Central Michigan	L 57–68	9–13 (4–7)	Convocation Center (6,226); Athens, OH
2/14/2015; 3:30 pm, ESPN3		at Miami (OH)	W 77-66	10–13 (5–7)	Millett Hall (2,196); Oxford, OH
2/18/2015; 7:00 pm		at Western Michigan	L 69–80	10–14 (5–8)	University Arena (2,517); Kalamazoo, MI
2/21/2015; 2:00 pm, ESPN3		Kent State	L 51–64	10–15 (5–9)	Convocation Center (5,790); Athens, OH
2/24/2015; 7:00 pm		Bowling Green	L 65–76	10–16 (5–10)	Convocation Center (5,233); Athens, OH
2/27/2015; 8:00 pm, ESPNU		at Akron	L 58–70	10–17 (5–11)	James A. Rhodes Arena (3,676); Akron, OH
3/03/2015; 7:00 pm, ESPN3		at Buffalo	L 66–93	10–18 (5–12)	Alumni Arena (3,597); Amherst, NY
3/06/2015; 7:00 pm		Miami (OH)	W 95–65	11–18 (6–12)	Convocation Center (5,727); Athens, OH
MAC tournament
3/09/2015; 8:00 pm		at Western Michigan; First round	L 74–82	11–19	University Arena (N/A); Kalamazoo, MI
*Non-conference game. ^{#}Rankings from AP Poll. (#) Tournament seedings in parentheses. All times are in Eastern Time.

== Statistics ==
=== Team statistics ===
Final 2014–15 statistics

Record	Ohio	OPP
Scoring	2028	2166
Scoring Average	67.60	72.20
Field goals – Att	727–1678	764–1775
3-pt. Field goals – Att	217–637	221–615
Free throws – Att	357–486	417–571
Rebounds	1023	1096
Assists	341	356
Turnovers	382	313
Steals	154	188
Blocked Shots	128	85

=== Player statistics ===
			Minutes		Scoring		Total FGs			3-point FGs			Free-Throws			Rebounds								
Player	GP	GS	Tot	Avg	Pts	Avg	FG	FGA	Pct	3FG	3FA	Pct	FT	FTA	Pct	Off	Def	Tot	Avg	A	PF	TO	Stl	Blk
Maurice Ndour	30	29	1047	34.9	479	16	164	339	0.484	27	62	0.435	124	158	0.785	68	182	250	8.3	50	83	89	33	68
Javarez Willis	29	28	963	33.2	430	14.8	152	363	0.419	87	222	0.392	39	45	0.867	7	84	91	3.1	93	47	81	25	0
Antonio Campbell	30	24	722	24.1	300	10	121	250	0.484	28	82	0.341	30	48	0.625	57	172	229	7.6	19	99	36	14	27
Ryan Taylor	29	27	874	30.1	235	8.1	88	203	0.433	28	97	0.289	31	41	0.756	15	57	72	2.5	37	60	33	12	10
Stevie Taylor	30	9	759	25.3	229	7.6	74	225	0.329	22	97	0.227	59	81	0.728	9	68	77	2.6	80	52	51	36	2
Treg Setty	29	2	512	17.7	148	5.1	56	121	0.463	11	33	0.333	25	41	0.61	31	65	96	3.3	27	72	35	15	7
Mike Laster	30	17	563	18.8	114	3.8	43	99	0.434	4	11	0.364	24	32	0.75	23	29	52	1.7	10	38	25	9	1
Khari Harley	24	4	400	16.7	62	2.6	18	50	0.36	8	25	0.32	18	20	0.9	10	25	35	1.5	21	42	18	8	5
Wadly Mompremier	17	5	141	8.3	24	1.4	9	19	0.474	1	3	0.333	5	16	0.313	6	12	18	1.1	3	17	8	2	7
Drew Crabtree	9	0	16	1.8	5	0.6	1	3	0.333	1	3	0.333	2	2	1	1	0	1	0.1	0	0	3	0	0
Sam Frayer	8	0	11	1.4	2	0.3	1	2	0.5	0	1	0	0	0	0	0	5	5	0.6	0	1	1	0	1
Chandler Thomas	3	0	4	1.3	0	0	0	3	0	0	1	0	0	0	0	1	0	1	0.3	0	0	1	0	0
Reggie Williams	7	0	12	1.7	0	0	0	1	0	0	0	0	0	2	0	0	0	0	0	1	1	0	0	0
Total	30	-	6024	-	2028	67.6	727	1678	0.433	217	637	0.341	357	486	0.735	268	755	1023	34.1	341	512	382	154	128
Opponents	30	-	6024	-	2166	72.2	764	1775	0.430	221	615	0.359	417	571	0.730	331	765	1096	36.5	356	491	313	188	85

Legend
GP	Games played	GS	Games started	Avg	Average per game
FG	Field-goals made	FGA	Field-goal attempts	Off	Offensive rebounds
Def	Defensive rebounds	A	Assists	TO	Turnovers
Blk	Blocks	Stl	Steals	High	Team high

== Awards and honors ==
=== All-MAC Awards ===
Postseason All-MAC teams
Team	Player	Position	Year
All-MAC Second Team	Maurice Ndour	F	Sr.
All-MAC Honorable Mention	Javarez Willis	G	Sr.

== See also ==
2014–15 Ohio Bobcats women's basketball team
