= 2014–15 Kent State Golden Flashes men's basketball team =

American college basketball season

2014–15 Kent State Golden Flashes men's basketball

MAC regular season co–champions MAC East Division co–champions

CIT, Quarterfinals
- Conference: Mid-American Conference
- East Division
- Record: 23–12 (12–6 MAC)
- Head coach: Rob Senderoff (4th season)
- Assistant coaches: Eric Haut; Bobby Steinburg; DeAndre Haynes
- Home arena: Memorial Athletic and Convocation Center

2014–15 Mid-American Conference men's basketball standings
	Conf.				Overall
Team	W		L	PCT	W		L	PCT
East
Buffalo †	12	–	6	.667	23	–	10	.697
Kent State	12	–	6	.667	23	–	12	.657
Bowling Green	11	–	7	.611	21	–	12	.636
Akron	9	–	9	.500	21	–	14	.600
Miami	8	–	10	.444	13	–	19	.406
Ohio	5	–	13	.278	10	–	20	.333
West
Central Michigan	12	–	6	.667	23	–	9	.719
Toledo	11	–	7	.611	20	–	13	.606
Western Michigan	10	–	8	.556	20	–	14	.588
Eastern Michigan	8	–	10	.444	21	–	14	.600
Northern Illinois	8	–	10	.444	14	–	16	.467
Ball State	2	–	16	.111	7	–	23	.233
† 2015 MAC tournament winner

The 2014–15 Kent State Golden Flashes men's basketball team represented Kent State University during the 2014–15 NCAA Division I men's basketball season. The Golden Flashes, led by fourth year head coach Rob Senderoff, played their home games at the Memorial Athletic and Convocation Center, colloquially known as the MAC Center, as members of the East Division of the Mid-American Conference. They finished the season 23–12, 12–6 in MAC play to finish in a share for the East Division championship as well as a share of the MAC overall regular season championship. They lost in the quarterfinals of the MAC tournament to Akron. They were invited to the CollegeInsider.com Tournament where they defeated Middle Tennessee in the first round and Texas A&M Corpus–Christi in the second round before losing in the quarterfinals to Northern Arizona.

== Roster ==
2014–15 Kent State Golden Flashes men's basketball team
Players
Coaches

Pos.	#	Name	Height	Weight	Year	Previous school	Hometown
G	0	Devareaux Manley	6 ft 4 in (1.93 m)	200 lb (91 kg)	Sr	Castlemont HS	Oakland, CA
G	1	Kris Brewer	6 ft 3 in (1.91 m)	185 lb (84 kg)	Sr	Brehm Prep	Memphis, TN
G	2	Kellon Thomas	5 ft 11 in (1.8 m)	185 lb (84 kg)	Jr	Southport HS	Indianapolis, IN
F/C	3	Marvin Jones	6 ft 10 in (2.08 m)	205 lb (93 kg)	Jr	Thornton HS; Highland CC	Chicago, IL
F	4	Chris Ortiz	6 ft 8 in (2.03 m)	225 lb (102 kg)	Jr	South Kent School	Brooklyn, NY
G	5	Xavier Pollard	6 ft 4 in (1.93 m)	200 lb (91 kg)	Sr	Suffield Academy; Maine	Bronx, NY
G	11	Jon Fleming	5 ft 9 in (1.75 m)	160 lb (73 kg)	So	Fishers HS	Fishers, IN
G/F	13	Gary Akbar	6 ft 5 in (1.96 m)	220 lb (100 kg)	Jr	Dunbar HS; San Jacinto CC	Dayton, OH
G/F	15	Craig Brown	6 ft 5 in (1.96 m)	220 lb (100 kg)	Sr	North Miami Beach HS; Rutgers	Miami, FL
F	20	Marquiez Lawrence	6 ft 8 in (2.03 m)	200 lb (91 kg)	So	Marion-Franklin HS	Columbus, OH
F	21	Khalig Spicer	6 ft 9 in (2.06 m)	220 lb (100 kg)	Jr	Robichaud HS	Detroit, MI
G	23	Derek Jackson	6 ft 1 in (1.85 m)	170 lb (77 kg)	RS Sr	Benedictine HS; Central Michigan	Cleveland, OH
F	32	Raasean Davis	6 ft 8 in (2.03 m)	270 lb (122 kg)	Fr	Paulding County HS	Chicago, IL
F	35	Jimmy Hall	6 ft 7 in (2.01 m)	235 lb (107 kg)	RS So	St. Anthony HS; Hofstra	Brooklyn, NY
C	41	Blake Vedder	7 ft 4 in (2.24 m)	235 lb (107 kg)	Sr	West Geauga HS; Indiana (PA)	Chesterland, OH

Head coach

- Rob Senderoff (Albany)

Assistant coach(es)

- Eric Haut (Kent State)
- Bobby Steinberg (Middle Tennessee)
- DeAndre Haynes (Kent State)

Legend

- (C) Team captain
- (S) Suspended
- (I) Ineligible
- (W) Walk-on
- Injured
- Current redshirt

== Schedule and results ==
Date time, TV	Opponent	Result	Record	Site (attendance) city, state
Non-Conference Games
11/15/2014*; 7:00 pm	at Youngstown State	W 69–61	1–0	Beeghly Center (2,840); Youngstown, OH
11/18/2014*; 8:00 pm	Malone; Men Against Breast Cancer Classic	W 62–52	2–0	MAC Center (2,247); Kent, OH
11/21/2014*; 8:00 pm	Southern Illinois; Men Against Breast Cancer Classic	W 74–51	3–0	MAC Center (855); Kent, OH
11/22/2014*; 7:30 pm	UIC; Men Against Breast Cancer Classic	W 78–60	4–0	MAC Center (2,816); Kent, OH
11/23/2014*; 3:30 pm	Yale; Men Against Breast Cancer Classic	L 59–66	4–1	MAC Center (2,183); Kent, OH
11/29/2014*; 7:00 pm	Loyola–Chicago	L 61–69	4–2	MAC Center (1,937); Kent, OH
12/06/2014*; 12:00 pm, ESPN3	at Kennesaw State	W 58–46	5–2	KSU Convocation Center (927); Kennesaw, GA
12/14/2014*; 3:00 pm	at Arkansas–Little Rock	W 60–55 ^{OT}	6–2	Jack Stephens Center (1,018); Little Rock, AR
12/19/2014*; 7:00 pm	North Carolina A&T	W 71–57	7–2	MAC Center (1,817); Kent, OH
12/21/2014*; 5:00 pm	vs. North Dakota State; Sun Bowl Invitational	W 53–52	8–2	Don Haskins Center (5,790); El Paso, TX
12/22/2014*; 9:00 pm	at UTEP; Sun Bowl Invitational	L 75–78	8–3	Don Haskins Center (6,290); El Paso, TX
12/30/2014*; 8:00 pm, ESPN3	at No. 13 Kansas	L 62–78	8–4	Allen Fieldhouse (16,300); Lawrence, KS
01/02/2015*; 7:00 pm	Texas–Pan American	W 74–54	9–4	MAC Center (1,732); Kent, OH
Conference Games
01/07/2015; 7:00 pm	Bowling Green	L 64–66	9–5 (0–1)	MAC Center (2,094); Kent, OH
01/10/2015; 8:00 pm, ESPN3	at Northern Illinois	W 67–65	10–5 (1–1)	Convocation Center (1,058); DeKalb, IL
01/14/2015; 7:00 pm	Eastern Michigan	W 65–59	11–5 (2–1)	MAC Center (2,892); Kent, OH
01/17/2015; 7:00 pm	Ohio	W 69–59	12–5 (3–1)	MAC Center (5,084); Kent, OH
01/21/2015; 7:00 pm	Toledo	W 67–60	13–5 (4–1)	MAC Center (3,374); Kent, OH
01/24/2015; 2:00 pm	at Ball State	W 63–52	14–5 (5–1)	John E. Worthen Arena (3,425); Muncie, IN
01/27/2015; 7:00 pm	Central Michigan	W 63–53	15–5 (6–1)	MAC Center (3,522); Kent, OH
01/30/2015; 10:00 pm, ESPNU	at Buffalo	L 55–80	15–6 (6–2)	Alumni Arena (5,797); Amherst, NY
02/04/2015; 7:00 pm	at Western Michigan	L 66–67	15–7 (6–3)	University Arena (2,433); Kalamazoo, MI
02/07/2015; 7:00 pm	Miami (OH)	W 61–60	16–7 (7–3)	MAC Center (3,510); Kent, OH
02/10/2015; 7:00 pm, ESPN3	at Akron	L 52–61	16–8 (7–4)	James A. Rhodes Arena (4,836); Akron, OH
02/13/2015; 6:00 pm, ESPNU	at Toledo	W 76–75 ^{OT}	17–8 (8–4)	Savage Arena (5,481); Toledo, OH
02/18/2015; 7:00 pm	Ball State	W 58–53	18–8 (9–4)	MAC Center (3,084); Kent, OH
02/21/2015; 2:00 pm, TWCSC	at Ohio	W 64–51	19–8 (10–4)	Convocation Center (5,790); Athens, OH
02/24/2015; 7:00 pm	at Miami (OH)	L 81–86 ^{OT}	19–9 (10–5)	Millett Hall (920); Oxford, OH
02/28/2015; 7:00 pm, ESPN3	Buffalo	L 65–71	19–10 (10–6)	MAC Center (5,587); Kent, OH
03/03/2015; 7:00 pm, TWCSC	at Bowling Green	W 81–80	20–10 (11–6)	Stroh Center (2,322); Bowling Green, OH
03/06/2015; 7:00 pm, ESPN2	Akron	W 79–77	21–10 (12–6)	MAC Center (6,327); Kent, OH
MAC tournament
03/12/2015; 9:00 pm, TWCSC	vs. Akron; Quarterfinals	L 51–53	21–11	Quicken Loans Arena (4,502); Cleveland, OH
CIT
03/18/2015*; 7:00 pm	at Middle Tennessee; First round	W 68–56	22–11	Murphy Center (2,782); Murfreesboro, TN
03/23/2015*; 7:00 pm	at Texas A&M–Corpus Christi; Second round	W 69–65	23–11	American Bank Center (2,015); Corpus Christi, TX
03/27/2015*; 10:00 pm, STO	at Northern Arizona; Quarterfinals	L 73–74 ^{OT}	23–12	Walkup Skydome (3,653); Flagstaff, AZ
*Non-conference game. ^{#}Rankings from AP Poll. (#) Tournament seedings in parentheses. All times are in Eastern.

== See also ==
- List of Kent State Golden Flashes men's basketball seasons
