= 2014–15 Toledo Rockets men's basketball team =

American college basketball season

Coordinates: 41°39′36.6″N 83°36′35.2″W

2014–15 Toledo Rockets men's basketball
- Conference: Mid-American Conference
- West Division
- Record: 20–13 (11–7 MAC)
- Head coach: Tod Kowalczyk (5th season)
- Assistant coaches: Jason Kaslow; Jeff Massey; Nick Dials
- Home arena: Savage Arena

2014–15 Mid-American Conference men's basketball standings
	Conf.				Overall
Team	W		L	PCT	W		L	PCT
East
Buffalo †	12	–	6	.667	23	–	10	.697
Kent State	12	–	6	.667	23	–	12	.657
Bowling Green	11	–	7	.611	21	–	12	.636
Akron	9	–	9	.500	21	–	14	.600
Miami	8	–	10	.444	13	–	19	.406
Ohio	5	–	13	.278	10	–	20	.333
West
Central Michigan	12	–	6	.667	23	–	9	.719
Toledo	11	–	7	.611	20	–	13	.606
Western Michigan	10	–	8	.556	20	–	14	.588
Eastern Michigan	8	–	10	.444	21	–	14	.600
Northern Illinois	8	–	10	.444	14	–	16	.467
Ball State	2	–	16	.111	7	–	23	.233
† 2015 MAC tournament winner

The 2014–15 Toledo Rockets men's basketball team represented the University of Toledo during the 2014–15 NCAA Division I men's basketball season. The Rockets, led by fifth-year head coach Tod Kowalczyk, played their home games at Savage Arena, as members of the West Division of the Mid-American Conference. They finished the season 20–13, 11–7 in MAC play to finish in second place in the West Division. They advanced to the semifinals of the MAC tournament, where they lost to Central Michigan. Despite having 20 wins, they were not invited to a postseason tournament.

== Roster ==
2014–15 Toledo Rockets men's basketball team
Players
Coaches

Pos.	#	Name	Height	Weight	Year	Previous school	Hometown
G/F	0	Kurt Hall	6 ft 6 in (1.98 m)	200 lb (91 kg)	Fr	North Chicago HS	North Chicago, Illinois
G	1	Jonathan Williams	6 ft 3 in (1.91 m)	180 lb (82 kg)	So	Southfield-Lathrup HS	Southfield, Michigan
G/F	2	Dre Applewhite	6 ft 5 in (1.96 m)	220 lb (100 kg)	So	Central HS; Mississippi State	Memphis, Tennessee
G	3	Stuckey Mosley	6 ft 3 in (1.91 m)	180 lb (82 kg)	Fr	Timber Creek HS	Orlando, Florida
G/F	4	Justin Drummond	6 ft 4 in (1.93 m)	200 lb (91 kg)	Sr	Riverdale Baptist School; Loyola (MD)	Washington, D.C.
F	15	Aubrey Williams	6 ft 7 in (2.01 m)	215 lb (98 kg)	RS So	IMG Academy	Bowie, Maryland
G	20	Julius Brown	5 ft 10 in (1.78 m)	170 lb (77 kg)	Sr	Hillcrest HS	Markham, Illinois
G	22	Angel Aparicio	6 ft 5 in (1.96 m)	190 lb (86 kg)	Jr	Leo XIII HS	Benicarló, Spain
F	24	J. D. Weatherspoon	6 ft 6 in (1.98 m)	215 lb (98 kg)	Sr	North HS; Ohio State	Columbus, Ohio
G	25	Jordan Lauf	6 ft 5 in (1.96 m)	190 lb (86 kg)	So	Napoleon HS	Napoleon, Ohio
C	33	Zach Garber	6 ft 10 in (2.08 m)	240 lb (109 kg)	So	Vanlue HS	Carey, Ohio
C	53	Nathan Boothe	6 ft 9 in (2.06 m)	250 lb (113 kg)	Jr	Warren Township HS	Gurnee, Illinois

Head coach

- Tod Kowalczyk (Minnesota Duluth)

Assistant coach(es)

- Jason Kaslow (Wisconsin–Stevens Point)
- Jeff Massey (Xavier)

Legend

- (C) Team captain
- (S) Suspended
- (I) Ineligible
- (W) Walk-on
- Injured
- Current redshirt

== Schedule ==
Date time, TV	Rank^{#}	Opponent^{#}	Result	Record	Site (attendance) city, state
Exhibition
11/08/2014*; 2:30 pm		Findlay	W 101–72		Savage Arena (N/A); Toledo, Ohio
Regular season
11/16/2014*; 2:00 pm		Northern Arizona	W 71–58	1–0	Savage Arena (4,128); Toledo, Ohio
11/18/2014*; 6:00 pm, ESPNU		at No. 15 VCU; Legends Classic	L 78–87	1–1	Siegel Center (7,637); Richmond, Virginia
11/21/2014*; 7:00 pm, P12N		at Oregon; Legends Classic	L 68–78	1–2	Matthew Knight Arena (5,790); Eugene, Oregon
11/24/2014*; 7:00 pm		Bucknell; Legends Classic	W 92–65	2–2	Savage Arena (4,419); Toledo, Ohio
11/25/2014*; 7:00 pm		Detroit; Legends Classic	L 79–82	2–3	Savage Arena (4,148); Toledo, Ohio
11/29/2014*; 3:00 pm, TV-20/ESPN3		at Oakland	L 79–81	2–4	Athletics Center O'rena (1,482); Rochester, Michigan
12/03/2014*; 7:00 pm, ESPN3		at Cleveland State	W 87–59	3–4	Wolstein Center (4,748); Cleveland, Ohio
12/06/2014*; 2:00 pm		Chicago State	W 87–59	4–4	Savage Arena (4,748); Toledo, Ohio
12/13/2014*; 7:00 pm		Arkansas State	W 73–65	5–4	Savage Arena (4,445); Toledo, Ohio
12/17/2014*; 7:00 pm, BCSN		Robert Morris	W 83–57	6–4	Savage Arena (4,120); Toledo, Ohio
12/20/2014*; 2:00 pm		at McNeese State	W 83–69	7–4	Burton Coliseum (391); Lake Charles, Louisiana
12/29/2014*; 7:00 pm, ESPN2		at No. 2 Duke	L 69–86	7–5	Cameron Indoor Stadium (9,314); Durham, North Carolina
01/03/2015*; 4:00 pm, ESPN3		at Northern Kentucky	W 57–55	8–5	The Bank of Kentucky Center (2,055); Highland Heights, Kentucky
01/06/2015; 7:00 pm, BCSN		Central Michigan	L 62–65	8–6 (0–1)	Savage Arena (4,584); Toledo, Ohio
01/09/2015; 7:00 pm, ESPNU		Akron	W 84–67	9–6 (1–1)	Savage Arena (5,509); Toledo, Ohio
01/14/2015; 7:00 pm		at Ohio	W 80–73	10–6 (2–1)	Convocation Center (7,714); Athens, Ohio
01/17/2015; 7:00 pm		Western Michigan	L 78–81 ^{OT}	10–7 (2–2)	Savage Arena (6,089); Toledo, Ohio
01/21/2015; 7:00 pm		at Kent State	L 60–67	10–8 (2–3)	Memorial Athletic and Convocation Center (3,374); Kent, Ohio
01/24/2015; 7:00 pm		Bowling Green	W 71–67	11–8 (3–3)	Savage Arena (7,392); Toledo, Ohio
01/27/2015; 7:00 pm, BCSN		Miami (OH)	W 70–65	12–8 (4–3)	Savage Arena (4,708); Toledo, Ohio
01/31/2015; 8:00 pm, ESPN3		at Northern Illinois	W 80–69	13–8 (5–3)	Convocation Center (1,635); DeKalb, Illinois
02/04/2015; 7:00 pm, BCSN		Eastern Michigan	W 84–60	14–8 (6–3)	Savage Arena (4,532); Toledo, Ohio
02/07/2015; 2:00 pm		at Ball State	W 72–61	15–8 (7–3)	John E. Worthen Arena (3,325); Muncie, Indiana
02/10/2015; 7:00 pm, ESPN3		at Buffalo	W 92–88	16–8 (8–3)	Alumni Arena (3,417); Amherst, New York
02/13/2015; 6:00 pm, ESPNU		Kent State	L 75–76 ^{OT}	16–9 (8–4)	Savage Arena (5,481); Toledo, Ohio
02/18/2015; 7:00 pm, ESPN3		at Akron	W 68–66	17–9 (9–4)	James A. Rhodes Arena (3,351); Akron, Ohio
02/21/2015; 2:00 pm		at Western Michigan	W 97–87	18–9 (10–4)	University Arena (3,451); Kalamazoo, Michigan
02/24/2015; 7:00 pm, BCSN		Northern Illinois			Savage Arena; Toledo, Ohio
02/25/2015; 8:00 pm, BCSN		Northern Illinois	L 82–84	18–10 (10–5)	Savage Arena (4,317); Toledo, Ohio
02/28/2015; 7:00 pm		Ball State	W 70–59	19–10 (11–5)	Savage Arena (6,812); Toledo, Ohio
03/03/2015; 7:00 pm, ESPN3		at Central Michigan	L 77–85	19–11 (11–6)	McGuirk Arena (3,793); Mount Pleasant, Michigan
03/06/2015; 7:00 pm		at Eastern Michigan	L 59–85	19–12 (11–7)	Convocation Center (1,494); Ypsilanti, Michigan
MAC tournament
03/12/2015; 6:30 pm, ESPN3		vs. Eastern Michigan; Quarterfinals	W 78–67	20–12	Quicken Loans Arena (4,502); Cleveland, Ohio
03/13/2015; 6:30 pm, ESPN3		vs. Central Michigan; Semifinals	L 66–75	20–13	Quicken Loans Arena; Cleveland, Ohio
*Non-conference game. ^{#}Rankings from AP Poll. (#) Tournament seedings in parentheses. All times are in Eastern.
