= 2014–15 Northern Illinois Huskies men's basketball team =

American college basketball season

2014–15 Northern Illinois Huskies men's basketball
- Conference: Mid-American Conference
- West Division
- Record: 14–16 (8–10 MAC)
- Head coach: Mark Montgomery (4th season)
- Assistant coaches: Jon Borovich; Lou Dawkins; Jason Larson
- Home arena: Convocation Center

2014–15 Mid-American Conference men's basketball standings
	Conf.				Overall
Team	W		L	PCT	W		L	PCT
East
Buffalo †	12	–	6	.667	23	–	10	.697
Kent State	12	–	6	.667	23	–	12	.657
Bowling Green	11	–	7	.611	21	–	12	.636
Akron	9	–	9	.500	21	–	14	.600
Miami	8	–	10	.444	13	–	19	.406
Ohio	5	–	13	.278	10	–	20	.333
West
Central Michigan	12	–	6	.667	23	–	9	.719
Toledo	11	–	7	.611	20	–	13	.606
Western Michigan	10	–	8	.556	20	–	14	.588
Eastern Michigan	8	–	10	.444	21	–	14	.600
Northern Illinois	8	–	10	.444	14	–	16	.467
Ball State	2	–	16	.111	7	–	23	.233
† 2015 MAC tournament winner

The 2014–15 Northern Illinois Huskies men's basketball team represented Northern Illinois University during the 2014–15 NCAA Division I men's basketball season. The Huskies, led by fourth year head coach Mark Montgomery, played their home games at the Convocation Center as members of the West Division of the Mid-American Conference. They finished the season 14–16, 8–10 in MAC play to finish in a tie for fourth place in the West Division. They lost in the first round of the MAC tournament to Akron.

== Roster ==
2014–15 Northern Illinois Huskies men's basketball team
Players
Coaches

Pos.	#	Name	Height	Weight	Year	Previous school	Hometown
C	0	Pete Rakocevic	6 ft 11 in (2.11 m)	245 lb (111 kg)	RS Sr	Wilbraham & Monson Academy; Sacramento State	Chicago, IL
G	2	Aaron Armstead	6 ft 4 in (1.93 m)	195 lb (88 kg)	Sr	Hales Franciscan HS; San Jose City College	Chicago, IL
G	4	Dontel Highsmith	6 ft 2 in (1.88 m)	190 lb (86 kg)	So	Dowagiac HS	Dowagiac, MI
G	5	Travon Baker	5 ft 10 in (1.78 m)	160 lb (73 kg)	Jr	Detroit Consortium	Detroit, MI
F	10	Darrell Bowie	6 ft 6 in (1.98 m)	220 lb (100 kg)	Jr	La Jolla Prep	Milwaukee, WI
G	11	Chukwuemeka Iroegbu	6 ft 4 in (1.93 m)	205 lb (93 kg)	RS Jr	Franklin HS; Washington State	Elk Grove, CA
G	12	Jordan Thomas	5 ft 11 in (1.8 m)	185 lb (84 kg)	Fr	Menomonee Falls (WI)	Northfield, IL
F	13	Kevin Gray	6 ft 8 in (2.03 m)	225 lb (102 kg)	Sr	Brooks Academy	Chicago, IL
F	21	Keith Gray	6 ft 8 in (2.03 m)	225 lb (102 kg)	RS Jr	Brooks Academy	Chicago, IL
G	23	Aaric Armstead	6 ft 5 in (1.96 m)	190 lb (86 kg)	So	La Jolla Prep	Chicago, IL
G	25	Jay DeHaan	6 ft 2 in (1.88 m)	175 lb (79 kg)	Fr	Waubonsie Valley HS	Naperville, IL
G	33	Anthony Johnson	6 ft 3 in (1.91 m)	190 lb (86 kg)	RS Sr	Whitney Young HS; Purdue	Chicago, IL
C	34	Marin Maric	6 ft 10 in (2.08 m)	240 lb (109 kg)	So	La Lumiere School	Split, Croatia
C	42	Jordan Threloff	6 ft 9 in (2.06 m)	255 lb (116 kg)	RS Sr	DeKalb HS; Illinois State	DeKalb, IL
G	55	Michael Orris	6 ft 2 in (1.88 m)	195 lb (88 kg)	RS So	Crete-Monee HS; Kansas State	Crete, IL

Head coach

- Mark Montgomery (Michigan State)

Assistant coach(es)

- Jon Borovich (Central Michigan)
- Lou Dawkins (Tulsa)
- Jason Larson (Grand Valley State)

Legend

- (C) Team captain
- (S) Suspended
- (I) Ineligible
- (W) Walk-on
- Injured
- Current redshirt

== Schedule ==
Date time, TV	Opponent	Result	Record	Site (attendance) city, state
Exhibition
11/08/2014*; 5:00 pm	Roosevelt	W 71–44		Convocation Center (1,242); DeKalb, IL
Regular season
11/15/2014*; 3:00 pm, ESPN3	Aurora	W 86-56	1-0	Convocation Center (981); DeKalb, IL
11/20/2014*; 8:00 pm, ESPN3	Idaho	W 78–67	2–0	Convocation Center (1,003); DeKalb, IL
11/26/2014*; 7:30 pm, ESPN3	at Iowa	L 49–70	2–1	Carver-Hawkeye Arena (14,357); Iowa City, IA
11/30/2014*; 1:00 pm, ESPN3	Maine	W 61–56	3–1	Convocation Center (716); DeKalb, IL
12/02/2014*; 8:00 pm, FS1	at DePaul	L 67–78	3–2	Allstate Arena (5,457); Rosemont, IL
12/13/2014*; 7:00 pm	at Eastern Illinois	L 55–59	3–3	Lantz Arena (2,044); Charleston, IL
12/16/2014*; 7:00 pm, ESPN3	Mississippi Valley State	W 71–64	4–3	Convocation Center (680); DeKalb, IL
12/19/2014*; 6:00 pm	at Dartmouth	L 55–58 ^{OT}	4–4	Leede Arena (701); Hanover, NH
12/22/2014*; 6:00 pm, ESPN3	at No. 16 Notre Dame	L 66–91	4–5	Edmund P. Joyce Center (7,471); South Bend, IN
12/29/2014*; 7:00 pm, ESPN3	Hampton	W 83–51	5–5	Convocation Center (802); DeKalb, IL
1/02/2015*; 7:00 pm, ESPN3	UC Riverside	W 72–67 ^{OT}	6–5	Convocation Center (873); DeKalb, IL
1/07/2015; 6:00 pm	at Ohio	W 70–60	7–5 (1–0)	Convocation Center (5,743); Athens, OH
1/10/2015; 7:00 pm, ESPN3	Kent State	L 65–67	7–6 (1–1)	Convocation Center (1,058); DeKalb, IL
1/14/2015; 6:00 pm, ESPN3	at Buffalo	L 63–82	7–7 (1–2)	Alumni Arena (2,258); Amherst, NY
1/17/2015; 11:00 am	at Eastern Michigan	L 46–54	7–8 (1–3)	Convocation Center (786); Ypsilanti, MI
1/21/2015; 7:00 pm, ESPN3	Akron	W 64–61	8–8 (2–3)	Convocation Center (957); DeKalb, IL
1/24/2015; 3:00 pm, ESPN3	Miami (OH)	L 55–60	8–9 (2–4)	Convocation Center (1,774); DeKalb, IL
1/27/2015; 6:00 pm	Bowling Green	L 46–56	8–10 (2–5)	Stroh Center (1,560); Bowling Green, OH
1/31/2015; 7:00 pm, ESPN3	Toledo	L 69–80	8–11 (2–6)	Convocation Center (1,635); DeKalb, IL
2/04/2015; 6:00 pm	at Miami (OH)	W 69–67	9–11 (3–6)	Millett Hall (1,147); Oxford, OH
2/07/2015; 7:00 pm, ESPN3	Bowling Green	L 65–69	9–12 (3–7)	Convocation Center (2,475); DeKalb, IL
2/10/2015; 7:00 pm, ESPN3	Ball State	W 75–63	10–12 (4–7)	Convocation Center (975); DeKalb, IL
2/14/2015; 3:30 pm	at Western Michigan	L 65–69	10–13 (4–8)	University Arena (2,712); Kalamazoo, MI
2/18/2015; 6:00 pm, ESPN3	at Central Michigan	L 66–68	10–14 (4–9)	McGuirk Arena (2,524); Mount Pleasant, MI
2/21/2015; 7:00 pm, ESPN3	Eastern Michigan	L 65–73	10–15 (4–10)	Convocation Center (2,302); DeKalb, IL
2/24/2015; 6:00 pm, ESPN3	at Toledo			Savage Arena; Toledo, OH
2/25/2015; 7:00 pm, ESPN3	at Toledo	W 84–82	11–15 (5–10)	Savage Arena (4,317); Toledo, OH
2/28/2015; 7:00 pm, ESPN3	Central Michigan	W 73–55	12–15 (6–10)	Convocation Center (1,548); DeKalb, IL
3/03/2015; 7:00 pm, ESPN3	Western Michigan	W 65–63	13–15 (7–10)	Convocation Center (992); DeKalb, IL
3/06/2015; 6:00 pm	at Ball State	W 71–67 ^{OT}	14–15 (8–10)	John E. Worthen Arena (2,585); Muncie, IN
MAC tournament
3/09/2015; 7:00 pm	at Akron; First round	L 52–76	14–16	James A. Rhodes Arena (2,631); Akron, OH
*Non-conference game. ^{#}Rankings from AP Poll. (#) Tournament seedings in parentheses. All times are in Central Time.
