= 2014–15 Bowling Green Falcons men's basketball team =

American college basketball season

2014–15 Bowling Green Falcons men's basketball

CIT, Second round
- Conference: Mid-American Conference
- East Division
- Record: 21–12 (11–7 MAC)
- Head coach: Chris Jans (1st season)
- Assistant coaches: David Ragland; Mark Downey; Corey Barker
- Home arena: Stroh Center

2014–15 Mid-American Conference men's basketball standings
	Conf.				Overall
Team	W		L	PCT	W		L	PCT
East
Buffalo †	12	–	6	.667	23	–	10	.697
Kent State	12	–	6	.667	23	–	12	.657
Bowling Green	11	–	7	.611	21	–	12	.636
Akron	9	–	9	.500	21	–	14	.600
Miami	8	–	10	.444	13	–	19	.406
Ohio	5	–	13	.278	10	–	20	.333
West
Central Michigan	12	–	6	.667	23	–	9	.719
Toledo	11	–	7	.611	20	–	13	.606
Western Michigan	10	–	8	.556	20	–	14	.588
Eastern Michigan	8	–	10	.444	21	–	14	.600
Northern Illinois	8	–	10	.444	14	–	16	.467
Ball State	2	–	16	.111	7	–	23	.233
† 2015 MAC tournament winner

The 2014–15 Bowling Green Falcons men's basketball team represented Bowling Green State University during the 2014–15 NCAA Division I men's basketball season. The Falcons, led by first year head coach Chris Jans in his only season, played their home games at the Stroh Center as members of the East Division of the Mid-American Conference. They finished the season 21–12, 11–7 in MAC play to finish in third place in the East Division. They advanced to the second round of the MAC tournament where they lost to Eastern Michigan. They received an invitation to the CollegeInsider.com Tournament where they defeated Saint Francis (PA) in the first round before losing in the second round to Canisius.

== Roster ==
2014–15 Bowling Green Falcons men's basketball team
Players
Coaches

Pos.	#	Name	Height	Weight	Year	Previous school	Hometown
C	0	Josh Gomez	6 ft 10 in (2.08 m)	226 lb (103 kg)	RS Jr	Rice HS; Iona	Bronx, NY
G	1	JD Tisdale	6 ft 4 in (1.93 m)	185 lb (84 kg)	So	Swartz Creek HS	Flint, MI
G	2	Anthony Hernderson	6 ft 1 in (1.85 m)	175 lb (79 kg)	RS Sr	Start HS	Toledo, OH
F	3	Spencer Parker	6 ft 7 in (2.01 m)	210 lb (95 kg)	Jr	West Bloomfield HS	West Bloomfield, MI
G	4	Zack Denny	6 ft 2 in (1.88 m)	184 lb (83 kg)	So	Valley View HS	Germantown, OH
G	5	Delvin Dickerson	6 ft 5 in (1.96 m)	232 lb (105 kg)	Jr	Westbury Christian; Paris JC	Houston, TX
F	10	David Joseph	6 ft 0 in (1.83 m)	187 lb (85 kg)	Jr	Westlake Prep; Howard JC	Queens, NY
G	11	Damarkeo Lyshe	5 ft 11 in (1.8 m)	160 lb (73 kg)	Sr	Westerville South HS	Westerville, OH
G	12	Jovan Austin	6 ft 1 in (1.85 m)	174 lb (79 kg)	Jr	South Grand Prairie HS; Paris JC	Grand Prairie, TX
G	15	Brandon Busuttil	6 ft 4 in (1.93 m)	174 lb (79 kg)	Jr	St. John's-Kilmarnock	Kitchener, ON
G/F	21	Chauncey Orr	6 ft 4 in (1.93 m)	195 lb (88 kg)	RS Jr	Bowling Green HS	Bowling Green, OH
F	22	Richaun Holmes	6 ft 8 in (2.03 m)	245 lb (111 kg)	Sr	Lockport HS; Moraine Valley CC	Lockport, IL
G	23	Jehvon Clarke	6 ft 1 in (1.85 m)	183 lb (83 kg)	Sr	Timken HS	Canton, OH
G	24	Matt Fox	6 ft 4 in (1.93 m)	185 lb (84 kg)	Fr	Anthony Wayne HS	Maumee, OH
F	32	Rasheed Worrell	6 ft 7 in (2.01 m)	205 lb (93 kg)	Fr	Sipsey Valley HS	Coker, AL
F	33	Garrett Mayleben	6 ft 9 in (2.06 m)	245 lb (111 kg)	RS Fr	Milford HS	Milford, OH

Head coach

- Chris Jans (Loras)

Assistant coach(es)

- Mark Downey (Univ. of Charleston)
- David Ragland (Southern Indiana)
- Corey Barker (Prairie View A&M University)

Legend

- (C) Team captain
- (S) Suspended
- (I) Ineligible
- (W) Walk-on
- Injured
- Current redshirt

== Schedule ==
Date time, TV	Opponent	Result	Record	Site (attendance) city, state
Exhibition
11/07/2014*; 4:30 pm	Notre Dame College	W 88–64		Stroh Center (N/A); Bowling Green, OH
Regular season
11/15/2014*; 3:00 pm	at Drake	W 77-58	1-0	Knapp Center (3,362); Des Moines, IA
11/19/2014*; 4:00 pm	Wright State	W 70–55	2–0	Stroh Center (1,441); Bowling Green, OH
11/25/2014*; 7:00 pm	Southeast Missouri State	W 62–54	3–0	Stroh Center (1,284); Bowling Green, OH
11/30/2014*; 3:00 pm, ESPN3	at Detroit	L 63–64	4–0	Calihan Hall (2,563); Detroit, MI
12/03/2014*; 8:00 pm	at WKU	L 52–62	4–1	E. A. Diddle Arena (3,852); Bowling Green, KY
12/06/2014*; 4:00 pm	Alabama A&M	W 64–47	5–1	Stroh Center (1,399); Bowling Green, OH
12/09/2014*; 7:00 pm, TWCSC	at Dayton	L 52–56	5–2	UD Arena (12,105); Dayton, OH
12/13/2014*; 4:00 pm, BCSN	Cleveland State	W 67–57	6–2	Stroh Center (2,045); Bowling Green, OH
12/21/2014*; 1:00 pm	Ferris State	L 68–82	6–3	Stroh Center (2,120); Bowling Green, OH
12/28/2014*; 3:00 pm, ESPN3	at South Florida	W 79–70	7–3	USF Sun Dome (3,513); Tampa, FL
1/03/2015*; 7:00 pm	Chicago State	W 58–35	8–3	Stroh Center (3,022); Bowling Green, OH
1/07/2015; 7:00 pm	at Kent State	W 66–64	9–3 (1–0)	Memorial Athletic and Convocation Center (2,094); Kent, OH
1/10/2015; 4:00 pm	Ohio	W 69–54	10–3 (2–0)	Stroh Center (2,002); Bowling Green, OH
1/14/2015; 7:00 pm	at Akron	L 50–67	10–4 (2–1)	James A. Rhodes Arena (3,313); Akron, OH
1/17/2015; 4:00 pm, BCSN	Ball State	W 58–46	11–4 (3–1)	Stroh Center (2,304); Bowling Green, OH
1/21/2015; 7:00 pm, BCSN	Eastern Michigan	W 74–58	12–4 (4–1)	Stroh Center (2,314); Bowling Green, OH
1/24/2015; 7:00 pm	at Toledo	L 67–71	12–5 (4–2)	Savage Arena (7,392); Toledo, OH
1/27/2015; 7:00 pm	Northern Illinois	W 56–46	13–5 (5–2)	Stroh Center (1,560); Bowling Green, OH
1/31/2015; 7:00 pm	Akron	L 68–69	13–6 (5–3)	Stroh Center (2,624); Bowling Green, OH
2/04/2015; 7:00 pm, ESPN3	at Central Michigan	W 76–74 ^{OT}	14–6 (6–3)	McGuirk Arena (2,474); Mount Pleasant, MI
2/07/2015; 8:00 pm, ESPN3	at Northern Illinois	W 69–65	15–6 (7–3)	Convocation Center (2,475); DeKalb, IL
2/10/2015; 8:00 pm, BCSN	Western Michigan	W 65–49	16–6 (8–3)	Stroh Center (1,474); Bowling, OH
2/14/2015; 4:30 pm	at Ball State	W 79–65	17–6 (9–3)	John E. Worthen Arena (2,664); Muncie, IN
2/18/2015; 7:00 pm, BCSN	Miami (OH)	L 56–67	17–7 (9–4)	Stroh Center (2,002); Bowling Green, OH
2/21/2015; 2:00 pm, BCSN	Buffalo	L 46–68	17–8 (9–5)	Stroh Center (2,857); Bowling Green, OH
2/24/2015; 7:00 pm	at Ohio	W 76–5	18–8 (10–5)	Convocation Center (5,233); Athens, OH
2/28/2015; 3:30 pm	at Miami (OH)	W 62–57	19–8 (11–5)	Millett Hall (1,905); Oxford, OH
3/03/2015; 7:00 pm, TWCSC	Kent State	L 80–81	19–9 (11–6)	Stroh Center (2,322); Bowling Green, OH
3/06/2015; 7:00 pm, ESPN3	at Buffalo	L 75–77	19–10 (11–7)	Alumni Arena (6,607); Buffalo, NY
MAC tournament
3/09/2015; 7:00 pm, BCSN	Ball State; First round	W 88–75	20–10	Stroh Center (1,240); Bowling Green, OH
3/11/2015; 6:30 pm, TWCSC	vs. Eastern Michigan; Second round	L 67–73	20–11	Quicken Loans Arena (2,411); Cleveland, OH
CIT
3/17/2015*; 7:00 pm	at Saint Francis (PA); First round	W 67–64	21–11	DeGol Arena (1,182); Loretto, PA
3/21/2015*; 1:00 pm, BCSN	Canisius; Second round	L 59–82	21–12	Stroh Center (1,223); Bowling Green, OH
*Non-conference game. ^{#}Rankings from AP Poll. (#) Tournament seedings in parentheses. All times are in Eastern Time.
