= 2014–15 Ball State Cardinals men's basketball team =

American college basketball season

2014–15 Ball State Cardinals men's basketball
- Conference: Mid-American Conference
- West Division
- Record: 7–23 (2–15 MAC)
- Head coach: James Whitford (2nd season)
- Assistant coaches: Jason Grunkemeyer; Danny Peters; Brian Thornton
- Home arena: John E. Worthen Arena

2014–15 Mid-American Conference men's basketball standings
	Conf.				Overall
Team	W		L	PCT	W		L	PCT
East
Buffalo †	12	–	6	.667	23	–	10	.697
Kent State	12	–	6	.667	23	–	12	.657
Bowling Green	11	–	7	.611	21	–	12	.636
Akron	9	–	9	.500	21	–	14	.600
Miami	8	–	10	.444	13	–	19	.406
Ohio	5	–	13	.278	10	–	20	.333
West
Central Michigan	12	–	6	.667	23	–	9	.719
Toledo	11	–	7	.611	20	–	13	.606
Western Michigan	10	–	8	.556	20	–	14	.588
Eastern Michigan	8	–	10	.444	21	–	14	.600
Northern Illinois	8	–	10	.444	14	–	16	.467
Ball State	2	–	16	.111	7	–	23	.233
† 2015 MAC tournament winner

The 2014–15 Ball State Cardinals men's basketball team represented Ball State University during the 2014–15 NCAA Division I men's basketball season. The Cardinals, led by second year head coach James Whitford, played their home games at John E. Worthen Arena as members of the West Division of the Mid-American Conference. They finished the season 7–23, 2–16 in MAC play to finish in last place in the West Division. They lost in the first round of the MAC tournament to Bowling Green.

== Roster ==
2014–15 Ball State Cardinals men's basketball team
Players
Coaches

Pos.	#	Name	Height	Weight	Year	Previous school	Hometown
G	0	Francis Kiapway	6 ft 3 in (1.91 m)	190 lb (86 kg)	Fr	St. Thomas More (CT)	Hamilton, Ontario
G	1	Zavier Turner	5 ft 9 in (1.75 m)	170 lb (77 kg)	So	Pike HS	Indianapolis, IN
F/C	2	Matt Kamieniecki	6 ft 8 in (2.03 m)	238 lb (108 kg)	RS Sr	Clarkston HS	Clarkston, MI
G	3	Tye Wilburn	5 ft 11 in (1.8 m)	185 lb (84 kg)	Fr	Lake Central HS	Schererville, IN
F	5	Rocco Belcaster	6 ft 7 in (2.01 m)	212 lb (96 kg)	RS So	Morton HS	Berwyn, IL
G	11	Kaleb Mallory	5 ft 8 in (1.73 m)	160 lb (73 kg)	So	Muncie Central HS	Muncie, IN
F	12	Bo Calhoun	6 ft 6 in (1.98 m)	234 lb (106 kg)	Jr	Washington HS	South Bend, IN
F	15	Franko House	6 ft 6 in (1.98 m)	234 lb (106 kg)	So	Concord HS	Elkhart, IN
F	21	Gill Bik	6 ft 7 in (2.01 m)	222 lb (101 kg)	Jr	Ascension of Our Lord Secondary School; Owens CC	Toronto, Ontario
F	22	Jermaine Tyler	6 ft 2 in (1.88 m)	160 lb (73 kg)	Fr	Arsenal Tech	Indianapolis, IN
F	24	Jeremiah Davis	6 ft 4 in (1.93 m)	195 lb (88 kg)	RS Jr	Huntington Prep; Cincinnati	Muncie, IN
F	32	Rashaun Richardson	6 ft 8 in (2.03 m)	190 lb (86 kg)	Fr	Arsenal Tech	Indianapolis, IN
F	33	Ryan Weber	6 ft 6 in (1.98 m)	211 lb (96 kg)	Jr	Roncalli HS; Youngstown State	Indianapolis, IN
F	34	Sean Sellers	6 ft 6 in (1.98 m)	195 lb (88 kg)	Fr	Greensburg HS	Greensburg, IN
C	44	Mading Thok	6 ft 11 in (2.11 m)	222 lb (101 kg)	RS So	Western Christian HS	Boyden, IA

Head coach

- James Whitford (Wisconsin)

Assistant coach(es)

- Jason Grunkemeyer (Miami (OH))
- Danny Peters (Ohio State)
- Brian Thornton (Xavier)

Legend

- (C) Team captain
- (S) Suspended
- (I) Ineligible
- (W) Walk-on
- Injured
- Current redshirt

== Schedule ==
Date time, TV	Opponent	Result	Record	Site (attendance) city, state
Regular season
11/14/2014*; 10:00 pm	at No. 25 Utah	L 72–90	0–1	Jon M. Huntsman Center (9,855); Salt Lake City, UT
11/17/2014*; 7:00 pm	IU-Kokomo	W 101–62	1–1	John E. Worthen Arena (3,244); Muncie, IN
11/22/2014*; 1:00 pm, ESPN3	at IUPUI	L 69–71 ^{OT}	1–2	Fairgrounds Coliseum (1,952); Indianapolis, IN
11/24/2014*; 7:00 pm	Grambling State	W 88–46	2–2	John E. Worthen Arena (2,827); Muncie, IN
12/03/2014*; 3:30 pm	at Eastern Illinois	L 54–61	2–3	Lantz Arena (1,204); Charleston, IL
12/06/2014*; 2:00 pm	Indiana State; Rivalry	W 70–63	3–3	John E. Worthen Arena (3,152); Muncie, IN
12/13/2014*; 8:00 pm, ESPN3	at Valparaiso; Rivalry	L 62–65	3–4	Athletics-Recreation Center (3,752); Valparaiso
12/17/2014*; 7:00 pm	James Madison	L 52–72	3–5	John E. Worthen Arena (2,257); Muncie, IN
12/20/2014*; 10:00 pm	at No. 19 San Diego State	L 57–70	3–6	Viejas Arena (12,414); San Diego, CA
12/28/2014*; 2:00 pm	Longwood	W 69–64	4–6	John E. Worthen Arena (2,276); Muncie, IN
01/03/2015*; 2:00 pm	Bethune-Cookman	W 51–48	5–6	John E. Worthen Arena (2,353); Muncie, IN
01/07/2015; 7:00 pm, ESPN3	at Eastern Michigan	W 60–59 ^{OT}	6–6 (1–0)	Convocation Center (1,036); Ypsilanti, MI
01/10/2015; 4:30 pm	Central Michigan	W 83–65	7–6 (2–0)	John E. Worthen Arena (3,036); Muncie, IN
01/14/2015; 7:00 pm, ESPN3	Western Michigan	L 93–95 ^{2OT}	7–7 (2–1)	Western Michigan (2,288); Kalamazoo, MI
01/17/2015; 4:00 pm, ESPN3	at Bowling Green	L 46–58	7–8 (2–2)	Stroh Center (2,304); Bowling Green, OH
01/21/2015; 7:00 pm	Ohio	L 73–82	7–9 (2–3)	John E. Worthen Arena (2,770); Muncie, IN
01/24/2015; 2:00 pm	Kent State	L 52–63	7–10 (2–4)	John E. Worthen Arena (3,425); Muncie, IN
01/27/2015; 7:00 pm	Akron	L 47–59	7–11 (2–5)	James A. Rhodes Arena (3,375); Akron, OH
01/31/2015; 3:30 pm, ESPN3	at Miami	L 73–79	7–12 (2–6)	Millett Hall (1,691); Oxford, OH
02/04/2015; 7:00 pm	Buffalo	L 78–82	7–13 (2–7)	John E. Worthen Arena (3,084); Muncie, IN
02/07/2015; 2:00 pm	Toledo	L 61–72	7–14 (2–8)	John E. Worthen Arena (3,325); Muncie, IN
02/10/2015; 8:00 pm, ESPN3	at Northern Illinois	L 63–75	7–15 (2–9)	Convocation Center (975); DeKalb, IL
02/14/2015; 4:30 pm	Bowling Green	L 65–79	7–16 (2–10)	John E. Worthen Arena (2,664); Muncie, IN
02/18/2015; 7:00 pm	at Kent State	L 53–58	7–17 (2–11)	MAC Center (3,087); Kent, OH
02/21/2015; 4:30 pm, ESPN3	at Central Michigan	L 60–83	7–18 (2–12)	McGuirk Arena (4,008); Mount Pleasant, MI
02/24/2015; 7:00 pm	Western Michigan	L 48–53	7–19 (2–13)	John E. Worthen Arena (2,794); Muncie, IN
02/28/2015; 7:00 pm	at Toledo	L 59–70	7–20 (2–14)	Savage Arena (6,812); Toledo, OH
03/03/2015; 7:00 pm, ESPN3	Eastern Michigan	L 60–67	7–21 (2–15)	John E. Worthen Arena (2,295); Muncie, IN
03/06/2015; 7:00 pm	Northern Illinois	L 67–71 ^{OT}	7–22 (2–16)	John E. Worthen Arena (2,585); Muncie, IN
MAC tournament
03/09/2015; 7:00 pm	at Bowling Green; First round	L 75–88	7–23	Stroh Center (1,240); Bowling Green, OH
*Non-conference game. ^{#}Rankings from AP Poll. (#) Tournament seedings in parentheses. All times are in Eastern.
