= 2014–15 Buffalo Bulls men's basketball team =

American college basketball season

2014–15 Buffalo Bulls men's basketball

MAC regular season co–champions MAC East Division co–champions MAC Tournament champions

NCAA tournament, round of 64
- Conference: Mid-American Conference
- East Division
- Record: 23–10 (12–6 MAC)
- Head coach: Bobby Hurley (2nd season)
- Assistant coaches: Levi Watkins; Nate Oats; Ben Wood
- Home arena: Alumni Arena

2014–15 Mid-American Conference men's basketball standings
| | Conf. | | | | Overall |
| Team | W | | L | PCT | W | | L | PCT |
|---|---|---|---|---|---|---|---|---|
East
| Buffalo † | 12 | – | 6 | .667 | 23 | – | 10 | .697 |
| Kent State | 12 | – | 6 | .667 | 23 | – | 12 | .657 |
| Bowling Green | 11 | – | 7 | .611 | 21 | – | 12 | .636 |
| Akron | 9 | – | 9 | .500 | 21 | – | 14 | .600 |
| Miami | 8 | – | 10 | .444 | 13 | – | 19 | .406 |
| Ohio | 5 | – | 13 | .278 | 10 | – | 20 | .333 |
West
| Central Michigan | 12 | – | 6 | .667 | 23 | – | 9 | .719 |
| Toledo | 11 | – | 7 | .611 | 20 | – | 13 | .606 |
| Western Michigan | 10 | – | 8 | .556 | 20 | – | 14 | .588 |
| Eastern Michigan | 8 | – | 10 | .444 | 21 | – | 14 | .600 |
| Northern Illinois | 8 | – | 10 | .444 | 14 | – | 16 | .467 |
| Ball State | 2 | – | 16 | .111 | 7 | – | 23 | .233 |
† 2015 MAC tournament winner

The 2014–15 Buffalo Bulls men's basketball team represented the University at Buffalo during the 2014–15 NCAA Division I men's basketball season. The Bulls, led by second year head coach Bobby Hurley, played their home games at Alumni Arena as members of the East Division of the Mid-American Conference. They finished the season 23–10, 12–6 in MAC play to be co–champions of the East Division and co–champions of the MAC overall regular season. They defeated Akron and Central Michigan to become champions of the MAC tournament. They received an automatic bid to the NCAA tournament, their first NCAA Division I Tournament bid in school history, where they lost in their first game in the Round of 64 to West Virginia.

== Roster ==
2014–15 Buffalo Bulls men's basketball team
Players
Coaches

| Pos. | # | Name | Height | Weight | Year | Previous school | Hometown |
|---|---|---|---|---|---|---|---|
| G | 1 | Lamonte Bearden | 6 ft 2 in (1.88 m) | 180 lb (82 kg) | Fr | Germantown HS | Milwaukee, WI |
| F | 2 | Will Regan | 6 ft 8 in (2.03 m) | 230 lb (104 kg) | Sr | Nichols School; Virginia | Buffalo, NY |
| G | 3 | Bobby Frasco | 6 ft 4 in (1.93 m) | 185 lb (84 kg) | Sr | Prospect HS | Mt. Prospect, IL |
| G | 5 | Mory Diane | 6 ft 3 in (1.91 m) | 175 lb (79 kg) | Fr | Pershing HS | Detroit, MI |
| G | 10 | Jarryn Skeete | 6 ft 3 in (1.91 m) | 175 lb (79 kg) | Jr | Wasatch Academy; Bridgton Academy | Brampton, ON |
| G | 11 | Shannon Evans | 6 ft 1 in (1.85 m) | 170 lb (77 kg) | So | Nansemond River HS; Hargrave Academy | Suffolk, VA |
| G/F | 20 | Rodell Wigginton | 6 ft 5 in (1.96 m) | 215 lb (98 kg) | Jr | Lee Academy; College of Central Florida | Dartmouth, NS |
| F | 23 | Justin Moss | 6 ft 7 in (2.01 m) | 240 lb (109 kg) | Jr | Romulus HS; Indian Hills CC | Detroit, MI |
| G | 24 | Christian Pino | 5 ft 7 in (1.7 m) | 145 lb (66 kg) | RS Fr | Romulus HS; Arizona State | Detroit, MI |
| F | 31 | Raheem Johnson | 6 ft 10 in (2.08 m) | 235 lb (107 kg) | So | Romulus HS; Barton CC | Detroit, MI |
| F | 34 | Ikenna Smart | 6 ft 10 in (2.08 m) | 225 lb (102 kg) | Fr | New Garden Friends School | Greensboro, NC |
| F | 35 | Xavier Ford | 6 ft 7 in (2.01 m) | 210 lb (95 kg) | Sr | Harrison HS | Colorado Springs, CO |

Head coach

- Bobby Hurley (Duke)

Assistant coach(es)

- Levi Watkins (NC State)
- Nate Oats (Maranatha)
- Ben Wood (Connecticut)

Legend

- (C) Team captain
- (S) Suspended
- (I) Ineligible
- (W) Walk-on
- Injured
- Current redshirt

== Schedule ==
| Date time, TV | Rank^{#} | Opponent^{#} | Result | Record | Site (attendance) city, state |
Exhibition
| 11/06/2014*; 7:00 pm | | Wheeling Jesuit | W 79–60 | – | Alumni Arena (1,676); Amherst, NY |
Regular season
| 11/14/2014*; 7:30 pm | | South Dakota State | W 69–67 | 1–0 | Alumni Arena (3,315); Amherst, NY |
| 11/16/2014*; 12:00 pm, ESPNU | | at No. 1 Kentucky; Cawood Ledford Classic | L 52–71 | 1–1 | Rupp Arena (22,175); Lexington, KY |
| 11/18/2014*; 7:00 pm | | at Texas–Arlington; Cawood Ledford Classic | W 74–68 | 2–1 | College Park Center (1,544); Arlington, TX |
| 11/21/2014*; Postponed | | Montana State; Cawood Ledford Classic | | | Alumni Arena; Amherst, NY |
| 11/25/2014*; 9:00 pm | | at Grand Canyon; Cawood Ledford Classic | W 80–64 | 3–1 | GCU Arena (5,688); Phoenix, AZ |
| 11/29/2014*; 4:15 pm | | at Canisius | W 72–57 | 4–1 | First Niagara Center (7,191); Buffalo, NY |
| 12/03/2014*; 7:00 pm | | at St. Bonaventure | L 63–72 | 4–2 | Reilly Center (3,469); Olean, NY |
| 12/07/2014*; 1:00 pm | | at Robert Morris | W 74–59 | 5–2 | Charles L. Sewall Center (433); Moon Township, PA |
| 12/16/2014*; 7:00 pm, ESPN3 | | Drexel | W 80–70 | 6–2 | Alumni Arena (2,402); Amherst, NY |
| 12/19/2014*; 7:00 pm, ESPN3 | | Niagara | W 88–62 | 7–2 | Alumni Arena (2,702); Amherst, NY |
| 12/28/2014*; 8:00 pm, BTN | | at No. 6 Wisconsin | L 56–68 | 7–3 | Kohl Center (17,279); Madison, WI |
| 12/30/2014*; 7:00 pm | | at Binghamton | W 76–50 | 8–3 | Binghamton University Events Center (3,534); Binghamton, NY |
| 1/03/2015*; 3:00 pm, ESPN3 | | Cornell | W 92–73 | 9–3 | Alumni Arena (3,192); Amherst, NY |
| 1/07/2015; 7:00 pm | | at Miami (OH) | W 79–72 | 10–3 (1–0) | Millett Hall (538); Oxford, OH |
| 1/10/2015; 1:00 pm | | at Western Michigan | L 68–78 | 10–4 (1–1) | University Arena (2,507); Kalamazoo, MI |
| 1/14/2015; 7:00 pm | | Northern Illinois | W 82–63 | 11–4 (2–1) | Alumni Arena (2,258); Amherst, NY |
| 1/17/2015; 3:00 pm, ESPN3 | | Miami (OH) | W 77–68 | 12–4 (3–1) | Alumni Arena (3,268); Amherst, NY |
| 1/21/2015; 7:00 pm, ESPN3 | | at Central Michigan | L 73–84 | 12–5 (3–2) | McGuirk Arena (2,210); Mount Pleasant |
| 1/24/2015; 2:00 pm | | at Ohio | L 61–63 | 12–6 (3–3) | Convocation Center (9,124); Athens, OH |
| 1/27/2015; 7:00 pm, ESPN3 | | Western Michigan | W 77–71 | 13–6 (4–3) | Alumni Arena (3,931); Amherst, NY |
| 1/30/2015; 10:00 pm, ESPNU | | Kent State | W 80–55 | 14–6 (5–3) | Alumni Arena (5,797); Amherst, NY |
| 2/04/2015; 7:00 pm | | at Ball State | W 82–78 | 15–6 (6–3) | John E. Worthen Arena (3,084); Muncie, IN |
| 2/07/2015; 7:00 pm, ESPN3 | | at Akron | L 72–75 | 15–7 (6–4) | James A. Rhodes Arena (3,570); Akron, OH |
| 2/10/2015; 7:00 pm, ESPN3 | | Toledo | L 88–92 | 15–8 (6–5) | Alumni Arena (3,417); Amherst, NY |
| 2/14/2015; 2:00 pm, ESPN3 | | Central Michigan | L 74–75 | 15–9 (6–6) | Alumni Arena (3,284); Amherst, NY |
| 2/18/2015; 7:00 pm | | at Eastern Michigan | W 78–63 | 16–9 (7–6) | Convocation Center (739); Ypsilanti, MI |
| 2/21/2015; 2:00 pm, ESPN3 | | at Bowling Green | L 56–68 | 17–9 (8–6) | Stroh Center (2,857); Bowling Green, OH |
| 2/24/2015; 7:00 pm, ESPN3 | | Akron | W 67–62 | 18–9 (9–6) | Alumni Arena (3,541); Amherst, NY |
| 2/28/2015; 7:00 pm, ESPN3 | | at Kent State | W 71–65 | 19–9 (10–6) | Memorial Athletic and Convocation Center (5,587); Kent, OH |
| 3/03/2015; 7:00 pm, ESPN3 | | Ohio | W 93–66 | 20–9 (11–6) | Alumni Arena (3,597); Amherst, NY |
| 3/06/2015; 7:00 pm | | Bowling Green | W 77–75 | 21–9 (12–6) | Alumni Arena (6,670); Amherst, NY |
MAC Tournament
| 3/13/2015; 9:00 pm, ESPN3 | | vs. Akron; Semifinals | W 68–59 | 22–9 | Quicken Loans Arena (6,027); Cleveland, OH |
| 3/14/2015; 6:30 pm, ESPN2 | | vs. Central Michigan; Championship game | W 89–84 | 23–9 | Quicken Loans Arena (5,266); Cleveland, OH |
NCAA tournament
| 3/20/2015*; 2:10 pm, TNT | (12 MW) | vs. (5 MW) No. 20 West Virginia; Second round | L 62–68 | 23–10 | Nationwide Arena (18,417); Columbus, OH |
*Non-conference game. ^{#}Rankings from AP Poll. (#) Tournament seedings in parentheses. MW=Midwest Region. All times are in Eastern Time.
