= Maurice Ndour =

Senegalese basketball player (born 1992)

Free agent
- Position: Center / power forward

Personal information
- Born: June 18, 1992 (age 34) Sindia, Senegal
- Listed height: 6 ft 9 in (2.06 m)
- Listed weight: 200 lb (91 kg)

Career information
- High school: Okayama Gakugeikan (Okayama, Japan)
- College: Monroe College (2011–2013); Ohio (2013–2015)
- NBA draft: 2015: undrafted
- Playing career: 2015–present

Career history
- 2015–2016: Real Madrid
- 2016–2017: New York Knicks
- 2016–2017: →Westchester Knicks
- 2017–2019: UNICS
- 2019–2020: Valencia Basket
- 2020–2021: Rytas Vilnius
- 2021: Zhejiang Golden Bulls
- 2021–2022: Rytas Vilnius
- 2022: Galatasaray Nef
- 2022–2023: Nagoya Diamond
- 2023: Guangxi Rhinos
- 2023: Hapoel Jerusalem
- 2024: Lokomotiv Kuban
- 2024–2026: Pallacanestro Brescia

Career highlights
- VTB United League Defensive Player of the Year (2019); Spanish League champion (2016); Spanish Cup winner (2016); 2× Second-team All-MAC (2014, 2015)
- Stats at NBA.com
- Stats at Basketball Reference
Medals
Men's basketball
Representing Senegal
AfroBasket
Bronze medal – third place	2017 Tunisia/Senegal
Bronze medal – third place	2021 Rwanda

Maurice Daly Ndour (born June 18, 1992) is a Senegalese professional basketball player who most recently played for Pallacanestro Brescia of the Lega Basket Serie A (LBA). He played college basketball for the Ohio Bobcats and has represented the Senegalese national team, where he participated in the 2014 FIBA Basketball World Cup.

== Early life ==
Ndour, a Senegalese native, was born in Sindia and raised in M'Bour where he played soccer and basketball as a youth. During his teenage years, he was noticed playing in a local basketball tournament and was asked if he'd like to play high school basketball in Japan. For his sophomore, junior and senior years, Ndour attended Okayama Gakugeikan High School where he was an all-Okayama MVP honoree and all-star selection in 2009 and 2010.

== College career ==
After graduating from Okayama Gakugeikan in 2011, Ndour moved to the United States where he enrolled at Monroe College and played two seasons for the Mustangs. He was a two-time NJCAA All-Region selection and finished his two-year career at Monroe with 848 points, placing him eighth on the all-time Mustang scoring list. He averaged 9.4 points, 6.4 rebounds and 2.4 blocks per game as a freshman in 2011–12, and 16.2 points, 10.5 rebounds and 2.3 blocks per game as a sophomore in 2012–13.

In 2013, Ndour transferred to Ohio University where he spent his final two college seasons playing for the Bobcats. As a junior in 2013–14, he averaged 13.8 points and 7.0 rebounds in 36 games, and earned second-team All-Mid-American Conference and NABC All-District 14 second team honors. As a senior in 2014–15, he again earned second-team All-MAC honors after averaging 16.0 points, 8.3 rebounds and 2.3 blocks per game.

== Professional career ==
=== Dallas Mavericks (2015) ===
After going undrafted in the 2015 NBA draft, Ndour joined the New York Knicks for the 2015 NBA Summer League. On July 23, 2015, Ndour signed with the Dallas Mavericks. He appeared in the team's first four preseason games but missed the final three games of the preseason schedule with a left tibial stress reaction. He was subsequently waived by the Mavericks on October 26 prior to the start of the regular season.

=== Real Madrid (2015–2016) ===
On December 5, 2015, Ndour signed a one-year deal with Real Madrid. In 12 league games for the club, he averaged 2.3 points and 1.8 rebounds per game. He also appeared in six EuroLeague games, averaging 1.7 points and 1.2 rebounds per game.

=== New York Knicks (2016–2017) ===
On July 14, 2016, Ndour signed with the New York Knicks. He made his debut for the Knicks on November 1, 2016, recording three points, two rebounds and one steal off the bench in a 102–89 loss to the Detroit Pistons. On April 4, 2017, in his first career start, Ndour had 13 points and 12 rebounds in a 100–91 win over the Chicago Bulls. Three days later, he scored a career-high 15 points in a 101–88 loss to the Memphis Grizzlies. During his rookie season, he had multiple assignments with the Westchester Knicks of the NBA Development League. On June 30, 2017, he was waived by the Knicks.

=== UNICS (2017–2019) ===
On November 29, 2017, Ndour signed with Russian club UNICS for the rest of the 2017–18 season. On August 6, 2018, Ndour re-signed with Russian club UNICS for one season with an option for 2019–20 season.

=== Valencia Basket (2019–2020) ===
On July 16, 2019, Ndour signed a one-year deal with Spanish club Valencia Basket. He averaged 6.3 points and 2.4 rebounds per game. Ndour was released from the team on July 8, 2020.

=== Rytas Vilnius (2020–2022) ===
On October 16, 2020, Ndour signed with Rytas Vilnius for a one-year deal.

=== Galatasaray (2022) ===
On February 3, 2022, he signed with Galatasaray Nef of the Basketbol Süper Ligi (BSL).

=== Hapoel Jerusalem (2023–2024) ===
On August 13, 2023, he signed with Hapoel Jerusalem of the Israeli Basketball Premier League.

=== Pallacanestro Brescia (2024–2026) ===
On July 30, 2024, he signed with Pallacanestro Brescia of the Lega Basket Serie A (LBA).

== Career statistics ==
Legend
GP	Games played	GS	Games started	MPG	Minutes per game
FG%	Field goal percentage	3P%	3-point field goal percentage	FT%	Free throw percentage
RPG	Rebounds per game	APG	Assists per game	SPG	Steals per game
BPG	Blocks per game	PPG	Points per game	**Bold**	Career high

=== NBA Regular season ===
Year	Team	GP	GS	MPG	FG%	3P%	FT%	RPG	APG	SPG	BPG	PPG
2016–17	New York	32	4	10.6	.453	.143	.731	2.0	.3	.5	.3	3.1
Career		32	4	10.6	.453	.143	.731	2.0	.3	.5	.3	3.1

=== G League ===
Year	Team	GP	GS	MPG	FG%	3P%	FT%	RPG	APG	SPG	BPG	PPG
2016-17	Westchester Knicks	18	18	28.1	.469	.276	.779	6.8	1.2	1.1	1.4	14.7
Career		18	18	28.1	.469	.276	.779	6.8	1.2	1.1	1.4	14.7

Legend
GP	Games played	GS	Games started	MPG	Minutes per game
FG%	Field-goal percentage	3P%	3-point field-goal percentage	FT%	Free-throw percentage
RPG	Rebounds per game	APG	Assists per game	SPG	Steals per game
BPG	Blocks per game	PPG	Points per game	PIR	Performance index rating
**Bold**	Career high

=== European leagues ===
Year	Team	GP	GS	MPG	FG%	3P%	FT%	RPG	APG	SPG	BPG	PPG	PIR
2015–16 EuroLeague	(Spain) Real Madrid	6	0	8.0	.555	.000	.000	1.2	.2	.5	.2	1.7	1.3
2017–18 EuroCup	(Russia) BC UNICS	12	0	17.6	.418	.333	.722	4.2	.8	1.3	.6	5.1	6.6
2018–19 EuroCup	(Russia) BC UNICS	18	10	21.0	.537	.000	.843	4.2	.7	1.1	1.2	9.6	11.5
2019–20 EuroLeague	(Spain) Valencia Basket	26	12	15.0	.585	.400	.806	2.4	.4	.9	.3	6.3	7.0

=== Domestic leagues ===
Year	Team	League	GP	MPG	FG%	3P%	FT%	RPG	APG	SPG	BPG	PPG
2015-16	(Spain) Real Madrid	Liga ACB	12	9.6	.500	.500	.636	1.7	.0	.4	.7	2.3
2017-18	(Russia) BC UNICS	VTB United League	22	20.7	.669	.500	.864	4.7	.8	1.1	.6	10.4
2018-19	(Russia) BC UNICS	VTB United League	22	22.6	.549	.250	.781	4.9	1.2	.9	1.0	10.4
2019-20	(Spain) Valencia Basket	Liga ACB	19	16.8	.443	.188	.825	3.7	.6	.6	.5	6.0
2020-21	(China) Zhejiang Golden Bulls	CBA	11	19.6	.659	.000	.550	6.1	1.0	1.6	.8	11.1
2020-21	(Lithuania) Rytas Vilnius	LKL	5	26.4	.667	.429	.762	6.0	1.0	1.2	.4	17.4
2021-22	(Lithuania) Rytas Vilnius	LKL	7	17.7	.569	.333	.706	3.1	1.4	.5	1.1	11.4
2021-22	(Turkey) Galatasaray S.K.	Basketbol Süper Ligi	9	28.4	.667	.000	.806	5.7	1.5	.8	1.5	13.4

=== College ===
Year	Team	GP	GS	MPG	FG%	3P%	FT%	RPG	APG	SPG	BPG	PPG
2013-14	Ohio	**36**	**31**	30.1	**.511**	.333	.730	7.0	1.6	.6	1.5	13.8
2014-15	Ohio	30	29	**34.9**	.484	**.435**	**.785**	**8.3**	**1.7**	**1.1**	**2.3**	**16.0**
Career		66	60	32.3	.498	.388	.757	7.6	1.6	.8	1.9	14.8

== Personal life ==
Ndour is the son of Anne Marie Dione and Robert Diegane Ndour. He has a brother, Bruno, step brother, Marcelin, and step sister, Madeleine. Ndour is fluent in five languages, including English, French, Japanese, Wolof and Serer.
