= Western Michigan Broncos men's basketball statistical leaders =

The Western Michigan Broncos men's basketball statistical leaders are individual statistical leaders of the Western Michigan Broncos men's basketball program in various categories, including points, assists, blocks, rebounds, and steals. Within those areas, the lists identify single-game, single-season, and career leaders. The Broncos represent Western Michigan University in the NCAA's Mid-American Conference.

Western Michigan began competing in intercollegiate basketball in 1913. However, the school's record book does not generally list records from before the 1950s, as records from before this period are often incomplete and inconsistent. Since scoring was much lower in this era, and teams played much fewer games during a typical season, it is likely that few or no players from this era would appear on these lists anyway.

The NCAA did not officially record assists as a stat until the 1983–84 season, and blocks and steals until the 1985–86 season, but Western Michigan's record books includes players in these stats before these seasons. These lists are updated through the end of the 2020–21 season.

== Scoring ==
Career
Rk	Player	Points	Seasons
1	David Kool	2122	2006–07 2007–08 2008–09 2009–10
2	Thomas Wilder	2040	2014–15 2015–16 2016–17 2017–18
3	Manny Newsome	1787	1961–62 1962–63 1963–64
4	Booker James	1743	1983–84 1984–85 1985–86 1986–87
5	Joe Reitz	1713	2004–05 2005–06 2006–07 2007–08
6	Saddi Washington	1688	1993–94 1995–96 1996–97 1997–98
7	Ben Reed	1668	2001–02 2002–03 2003–04 2004–05
8	Jim Havrilla	1554	1988–89 1989–90 1990–91 1991–92
9	Tucker Haymond	1545	2013–14 2014–15 2015–16 2016–17
10	David Brown	1536	2009–10 2010–11 2011–12 2012–13 2013–14 2014–15

Season
Rk	Player	Points	Season
1	David Kool	714	2009–10
2	Manny Newsome	654	1963–64
3	David Brown	631	2013–14
4	Kenny Cunningham	630	1979–80
5	Saddi Washington	626	1997–98
6	Gene Ford	620	1968–69
7	Thomas Wilder	616	2016–17
8	Thomas Wilder	603	2017–18
9	Booker James	598	1986–87
10	Lamar Norman Jr.	594	2021–22

Single game
Rk	Player	Points	Season	Opponent
1	Gene Ford	46	1968–69	Loyola (Ill.)
2	Manny Newsome	45	1963–64	Michigan St.
	Manny Newsome	45	1963–64	Toledo
4	Manny Newsome	44	1963–64	Loyola (Ill.)
5	Donald Petties	43	1984–85	Bowling Green
6	Gene Ford	42	1968–69	Bowling Green
7	Booker James	41	1986–87	Northern Ill.
8	Ajac Triplett	40	1963–64	Marshall
	Dave Anderson	40	1964–65	Marshall
	Ellis Hull	40	1969–70	Tennessee Tech
	Booker James	40	1986–87	Northern Ill.
	Thomas Wilder	40	2017–18	Toledo

== Rebounds ==
Career
Rk	Player	Rebounds	Seasons
1	Paul Griffin	1008	1972–73 1973–74 1974–75 1975–76
2	Tom Cutter	947	1973–74 1974–75 1975–76 1976–77
3	Joe Reitz	939	2004–05 2005–06 2006–07 2007–08
4	Booker James	864	1983–84 1984–85 1985–86 1986–87
5	Anthony Kann	846	2000–01 2001–02 2002–03 2003–04
6	Ben Handlogten	833	1992–93 1993–94 1994–95 1995–96
7	Edgar Blair	800	1956–57 1957–58 1958–59
8	Jim Havrilla	770	1988–89 1989–90 1990–91 1991–92
9	Mike Seberger	759	1978–79 1979–80 1980–81 1981–82
10	Reggie Lacefield	753	1965–66 1966–67 1967–68

Season
Rk	Player	Rebounds	Season
1	Edgar Blair	324	1957–58
2	Seth Dugan	316	2018–19
3	Bob Bolton	313	1960–61
4	Shayne Whittington	308	2012–13
5	Earl Jenkins	300	1970–71
6	Tom Cutter	298	1975–76
7	Markeese Hastings	289	2022–23
8	Jack Smith	288	1955–56
9	Tom Cutter	287	1976–77
10	Edgar Blair	285	1958–59

Single game
Rk	Player	Rebounds	Season	Opponent
1	Reggie Lacefield	26	1967–68	Illinois St.
2	Frank Ayers	25	1972–73	Loyola (Ill.)
3	Edgar Blair	24	1957–58	Valparaiso
4	Paul Griffin	23	1972–73	Kent
5	Tom Cutter	22	1975–76	N. Iowa
	Tom Cutter	22	1974–75	Central Michigan
	Earl Jenkins	22	1970–71	Minn.-Duluth
	Ron Emerick	22	1961–62	Ohio
	Jack Smith	22	1956–57	Great Lakes
	Ron Jackson	22	1952–53	Kent State
	Seth Dugan	22	2018–19	Detroit Mercy

== Assists ==
Career
Rk	Player	Assists	Seasons
1	Mike Douglas	477	2008–09 2009–10 2010–11 2011–12
2	Billy Stanback	427	1986–87 1987–88 1988–89 1989–90
3	Thomas Wilder	418	2014–15 2015–16 2016–17 2017–18
4	Brian Snider	406	2002–03 2003–04 2004–05 2005–06
5	Todd Dietrich	391	1977–78 1978–79 1979–80 1980–81
6	Jim Kurzen	373	1972–73 1973–74 1974–75 1975–76
7	Michael Redell	358	2006–07 2007–08 2008–09
8	Robby Collum	351	2000–01 2001–02 2002–03
9	Rickey Willis	317	2001–02 2002–03 2003–04 2004–05
10	Rod Brown	291	1998–99 1999–00

Season
Rk	Player	Assists	Season
1	Rod Brown	170	1999–00
2	Mike Douglas	168	2010–11
3	Jason Kimbrough	166	1997–98
4	Rickey Willis	160	2004–05
5	Brian Snider	159	2005–06
6	Brian Snider	149	2003–04
	Mike Douglas	149	2009–10
8	Dan Zachary	147	1984–85
9	Mike Douglas	146	2011–12
10	Michael Redell	142	2006–07

Single game
Rk	Player	Assists	Season	Opponent
1	Todd Dietrich	17	1978–79	Bowling Green
2	Mike Douglas	13	2010–11	Towson
	Rod Brown	13	1999–00	Marshall
	Robby Collum	13	2001–02	Oakland
5	Rod Brown	12	1999–00	Bowling Green
	Rod Brown	12	1999–00	Oakland
	Ebon Sanders	12	1992–93	Oregon State
	Chris Brawley	12	1988–89	Youngstown State
	Jim Kurzen	12	1974–75	Eastern Michigan
10	Jason Kimbrough	11	1997–98	Bowling Green
	Rickey Willis	11	2004–05	Ohio
	Dan Zachary	11	1984–85	Northern Illinois
	Dan Zachary	11	1984–85	Marquette
	David Schluter	11	1982–83	Michigan St.

== Steals ==
Career
Rk	Player	Steals	Seasons
1	Robby Collum	199	2000–01 2001–02 2002–03
2	Thomas Wilder	190	2014–15 2015–16 2016–17 2017–18
3	Booker James	185	1983–84 1984–85 1985–86 1986–87
4	Anthony Kann	177	2000–01 2001–02 2002–03 2003–04
5	Saddi Washington	173	1993–94 1995–96 1996–97 1997–98
6	David Kool	163	2006–07 2007–08 2008–09 2009–10
7	Rashod Johnson	156	1994–95 1995–96 1996–97 1997–98
8	Brian Snider	149	2002–03 2003–04 2004–05 2005–06
9	Darrick Brooks	146	1989–90 1990–91 1991–92 1992–93
10	Ben Handlogten	142	1992–93 1993–94 1994–95 1995–96

Season
Rk	Player	Steals	Season
1	Robby Collum	83	2002–03
2	Robby Collum	72	2001–02
3	Brian Snider	63	2005–06
4	Thomas Wilder	62	2017–18
5	Mike Williams	60	2003–04
6	Anthony Kann	59	2002–03
7	David Kool	58	2009–10
8	Booker James	57	1986–87
	Saddi Washington	57	1996–97

Single game
Rk	Player	Steals	Season	Opponent
1	Robby Collum	7	2001–02	Eastern Mich.
	Robby Collum	7	2001–02	Wis.-Milwaukee
	Cordell Eley	7	1984–85	Valparaiso
4	Robby Collum	6	2002–03	Northern Ill.
	Robby Collum	6	2002–03	Akron
	Rod Brown	6	1999–00	Toledo
	Leon McGee	6	1993–94	Eastern Mich.
	Booker James	6	1986–87	Miami
	Booker James	6	1986–87	Northern Ill.
	Harold Triche	6	1979–80	Lake Superior St.
	Thomas Wilder	6	2017–18	Bowling Green
	Thomas Wilder	6	2017–18	South Carolina
	Chansey Willis	6	2024–25	Buffalo

== Blocks ==
Career
Rk	Player	Blocks	Seasons
1	Matt Van Abbema	149	1991–92 1992–93 1993–94 1994–95
2	Mike Seberger	137	1978–79 1979–80 1980–81 1981–82
3	Shayne Whittington	130	2009–10 2011–12 2012–13 2013–14
4	Ben Handlogten	116	1992–93 1993–94 1994–95 1995–96
5	Donald Lawson	104	2006–07 2007–08 2008–09 2009–10
6	Drake LaMont	89	2014–15 2015–16 2016–17 2017–18
7	Steve Riikonen	83	1985–86 1986–87 1987–88
8	Kelvin Oliver	79	1982–83 1983–84 1984–85
	Seth Dugan	79	2015–16 2016–17 2017–18 2018–19
10	Nate Hutcheson	71	2009–10 2010–11 2011–12 2012–13

Season
Rk	Player	Blocks	Season
1	Shayne Whittington	58	2012–13
2	Matt Van Abbema	56	1993–94
3	LaMarcus Lowe	48	2008–09
4	Matt Van Abbema	47	1992–93
	Donald Lawson	47	2009–10
	Shayne Whittington	47	2013–14
7	Matt Van Abbema	44	1994–95
8	Ben Handlogten	41	1995–96
9	Mike Seberger	37	1980–81
	Mike Seberger	37	1981–82

Single game
Rk	Player	Blocks	Season	Opponent
1	Matt Van Abbema	7	1992–93	Toledo
	Ben Handlogten	7	1995–96	Purdue
	LaMarcus Lowe	7	2008–09	Eastern Mich.
4	Juwan Howard Jr.	6	2010–11	Ohio
	Mike Williams	6	2003–04	Detroit
	Paul Griffin	6	1975–76	Miami
	Shayne Whittington	6	2012–13	Oakland
