= 2015–16 Bowling Green Falcons men's basketball team =

American college basketball season

2015–16 Bowling Green Falcons men's basketball
- Conference: Mid-American Conference
- East Division
- Record: 16–18 (5–13 MAC)
- Head coach: Michael Huger (1st season)
- Assistant coaches: Louis Rowe; Anthony Stacey; Mike Summey
- Home arena: Stroh Center

2015–16 Mid-American Conference men's basketball standings
	Conf.				Overall
Team	W		L	PCT	W		L	PCT
East
Akron	13	–	5	.722	26	–	9	.743
Ohio	11	–	7	.611	23	–	12	.657
Kent State	10	–	8	.556	19	–	13	.594
Buffalo †	10	–	8	.556	20	–	15	.571
Miami (OH)	6	–	12	.333	13	–	20	.394
Bowling Green	5	–	13	.278	16	–	18	.471
West
Ball State	10	–	8	.556	21	–	14	.600
Central Michigan	10	–	8	.556	17	–	16	.515
Northern Illinois	9	–	9	.500	21	–	13	.618
Eastern Michigan	9	–	9	.500	18	–	15	.545
Toledo	8	–	10	.444	17	–	15	.531
Western Michigan	7	–	11	.389	13	–	19	.406
† 2016 MAC tournament winner

The 2015–16 Bowling Green Falcons men's basketball team represented Bowling Green State University during the 2015–16 NCAA Division I men's basketball season. The Falcons, led by first year head coach Michael Huger, played their home games at the Stroh Center as members of the East Division of the Mid-American Conference. They finished the season 16–18, 5–13 in MAC play to finish in last place in the East Division. They defeated Kent State and Central Michigan to advance to the semifinals of the MAC tournament where they lost to Akron.

== Previous season ==
The Falcons finished the season 21–12, 11–7 in MAC play to finish in third place in the East Division. They advanced to the second round of the MAC tournament where they lost to Eastern Michigan. They received an invitation to the CollegeInsider.com Tournament where they defeated Saint Francis (PA) in the first round before losing in the second round to Canisius.

== Departures ==
Name	Number	Pos.	Height	Weight	Year	Hometown	Notes
Anthony Hernderson	2	G	6'1"	175	RS Senior	Toledo, OH	Graduated
Delvin Dickerson	5	G	6'5"	232	Junior	Houston, TX	Transferred to North Carolina Central
Damarkeo Lyshe	11	G	5'11"	160	Senior	Westerville, OH	Graduated
Jovan Austin	12	G	6'1"	174	Junior	Grand Prairie, TX	Transferred to Texas A&M–Commerce
Chauncey Orr	21	G/F	6'4"	195	RS Junior	Bowling Green, OH	Graduated & transferred to Hawaii Pacific
Richaun Holmes	22	F	6'8"	245	Senior	Lockport, IL	Graduated/2015 NBA draft
Jehvon Clarke	23	G	6'1"	183	Senior	Canton, OH	Graduated

=== Incoming transfers ===
Name	Number	Pos.	Height	Weight	Year	Hometown	Previous School
Wesley Alcegaire	14	F	6'5"	215	Junior	Miami, FL	Junior college transferred from Daytona State College
Ismail Ali	20	G	6'1"	170	Junior	South Hayward, CA	Junior college transferred from Antelope Valley College

== Recruiting class of 2015 ==
College recruiting information
Name	Hometown	School	Height	Weight	Commit date
Antwon Lillard; SF	Cleveland, OH	Central Catholic High School	6 ft 2 in (1.88 m)	170 lb (77 kg)	
Antwon Lillard; SF	Recruit ratings: Scout: Rivals: (NR)				
Jalone Friday; PF	Oklahoma City, OK	Oklahoma City Storm Homeschool	6 ft 8 in (2.03 m)	220 lb (100 kg)	Aug 31, 2014
Jalone Friday; PF	Recruit ratings: Scout: Rivals: (NR)				
Malik Hluchoweckyj; PG	Bellevue, NE	Bellevue West High School	5 ft 11 in (1.80 m)	170 lb (77 kg)	Oct 6, 2014
Malik Hluchoweckyj; PG	Recruit ratings: Scout: Rivals: (NR)				
Demajeo Wiggins; PF	Toledo, OH	Springfield High School	6 ft 8 in (2.03 m)	224 lb (102 kg)	Apr 21, 2015
Demajeo Wiggins; PF	Recruit ratings: Scout: Rivals: (NR)				
Overall recruit ranking:
Note: In many cases, Scout, Rivals, 247Sports, On3, and ESPN may conflict in their listings of height and weight.; In these cases, the average was taken. ESPN grades are on a 100-point scale.; Sources: "2015 Team Ranking". Rivals.

== Roster ==
2015–16 Bowling Green Falcons men's basketball team
Players
Coaches

Pos.	#	Name	Height	Weight	Year	Previous school	Hometown
C	0	Josh Gomez	6 ft 10 in (2.08 m)	226 lb (103 kg)	RS Sr	Rice HS; Iona	Bronx, NY
F	1	Demajeo Wiggins	6 ft 9 in (2.06 m)	225 lb (102 kg)	Fr	Springfield HS	Toledo, OH
G	2	Malik Hluchoweckyj	6 ft 1 in (1.85 m)	175 lb (79 kg)	Fr	Bellevue West HS	Bellevue, NE
F	3	Spencer Parker	6 ft 7 in (2.01 m)	210 lb (95 kg)	Sr	West Bloomfield HS	West Bloomfield, MI
G	4	Zack Denny	6 ft 2 in (1.88 m)	184 lb (83 kg)	Jr	Valley View HS	Germantown, OH
G	5	JD Tisdale	6 ft 4 in (1.93 m)	185 lb (84 kg)	Jr	Swartz Creek HS	Flint, MI
F	10	David Joseph	6 ft 0 in (1.83 m)	187 lb (85 kg)	Sr	Westlake Prep; Howard JC	Queens, NY
G	14	Wes Alcegaire	6 ft 5 in (1.96 m)	185 lb (84 kg)	Jr	Archbishop Curley-Notre Dame; Daytona State College	Miami, FL
G	15	Brandon Busuttil	6 ft 4 in (1.93 m)	205 lb (93 kg)	Sr	St. John's-Kilmarnock	Kitchener, ON
G	20	Ismail Ail	6 ft 1 in (1.85 m)	165 lb (75 kg)	Jr	San Leandro HS; Antelope Valley College	South Hayward, CA
G	24	Matt Fox (W)	6 ft 4 in (1.93 m)	185 lb (84 kg)	So	Anthony Wayne HS	Maumee, OH
F	32	Rasheed Worrell	6 ft 7 in (2.01 m)	205 lb (93 kg)	RS Fr	Sipsey Valley HS	Coker, AL
F	33	Garrett Mayleben	6 ft 9 in (2.06 m)	245 lb (111 kg)	RS So	Milford HS	Milford, OH

Head coach

- Michael Huger (Bowling Green)

Assistant coach(es)

- Louis Rowe (James Madison)
- Anthony Stacey (Bowling Green)
- Mike Summey (NC State)

Legend

- (C) Team captain
- (S) Suspended
- (I) Ineligible
- (W) Walk-on
- Injured
- Current redshirt

Roster

== Schedule ==
Date time, TV	Rank^{#}	Opponent^{#}	Result	Record	Site (attendance) city, state
Exhibition
11/06/2015*; 6:00 pm, ESPN3		Notre Dame College	W 74–65	–	Stroh Center; Bowling Green, OH
Non-conference regular season
11/14/2015*; 2:00 pm, ESPN3		New Orleans	W 79–61	1–0	Stroh Center; Bowling Green, OH
11/18/2015*; 7:00 pm, ESPN3		Cincinnati; Bill Frack Challenge	L 50–83	1–1	Stroh Center (3,411); Bowling Green, OH
11/21/2015*; 4:00 pm		vs. North Dakota; FGCU Classic	L 59–77	1–2	Alico Arena (3,562); Fort Myers, FL
11/22/2015*; 4:00 pm		vs. Youngstown State; FGCU Classic	W 79–72	2–2	Alico Arena (3,412); Fort Myers, FL
11/23/2015*; 7:00 pm, ESPN3		at Florida Gulf Coast; FGCU Classic	W 82–77	3–2	Alico Arena (3,854); Fort Myers, FL
11/29/2015*; 2:00 pm, ESPN3		Urbana; FGCU Classic	W 96–55	4–2	Stroh Center (1,450); Bowling Green, OH
12/02/2015*; 8:00 pm, ESPN3		UMBC	W 72–64	5–2	Stroh Center (2,019); Bowling Green, OH
12/05/2015*; 4:00 pm, ESPN3		Drake	W 75-63	6-2	Stroh Center; Bowling Green, OH
12/08/2015*; 8:00 pm		at Southeast Missouri State	W 79-52	7-2	Show Me Center; Cape Girardeau, MO
12/12/2015*; 1:00 pm, ESPN3		at Detroit	W 95-80	7-3	Calihan Hall (1,609); Detroit, MI
12/20/2015*; 4:30 pm, ESPN3		at Wright State	L 47–83	7–4	Nutter Center (3,772); Dayton, OH
12/23/2015*; 1:00 pm, ESPN3		at Cleveland State	W 62–47	8–4	Wolstein Center (1,725); Cleveland, OH
01/02/2016*; 4:00 pm, ESPN3		Oakland City	W 87–56	9–4	Stroh Center (1,916); Bowling Green, OH
MAC regular season
01/06/2016; 7:00 pm, BCSN/ESPN3		Miami (OH)	W 73–62	10–4 (1–0)	Stroh Center (1,611); Bowling Green, OH
01/09/2016; 2:00 pm, ESPN3		Central Michigan	L 67–79	10–5 (1–1)	Stroh Center (2,432); Bowling Green, OH
01/12/2016; 7:00 pm, TWCSC/ESPN3		at Ohio	W 91–75	11–5 (2–1)	Convocation Center (7,083); Athens, OH
01/16/2016; 12:00 pm, ESPN3		at Eastern Michigan	W 84-79	12–5 (3–1)	Convocation Center (1,280); Ypsilanti, MI
01/19/2016; 7:00 pm, BCSN/ESPN3		Toledo	L 74–81	12–6 (3–2)	Stroh Center (3,304); Bowling Green, OH
01/23/2016; 4:00 pm, ESPN3		Kent State	L 59–62	12–7 (3–3)	Stroh Center (3,100); Bowling Green, OH
01/26/2016; 7:00 pm		at Western Michigan	W 79–78	13–7 (4–3)	University Arena (2,245); Kalamazoo, MI
01/30/2016; 4:30 pm		at Central Michigan	L 65–77	13–8 (4–4)	McGuirk Arena (3,758); Mount Pleasant, MI
02/02/2016; 7:00 pm, ESPN3		Ball State	L 64–72	13–9 (4–5)	Stroh Center (2,593); Bowling Green, OH
02/06/2016; 3:30 pm		at Miami (OH)	L 51–55	13–10 (4–6)	Millett Hall (1,330); Oxford, OH
02/09/2016; 7:00 pm, ESPN3		Akron	L 68–83	13–11 (4–7)	Stroh Center (1,554); Bowling Green, OH
02/13/2016; 2:00 pm, ESPN3		Western Michigan	L 68–74	13–12 (4–8)	Stroh Center; Bowling Green, OH
02/16/2016; 8:00 pm		at Northern Illinois	L 60–71	13–13 (4–9)	Convocation Center (1,148); DeKalb, IL
02/20/2016; 3:30 pm		at Buffalo	L 74–88	13–14 (4–10)	Alumni Arena (3,397); Amherst, NY
02/23/2016; 7:00 pm, ESPN3		Ohio	W 87–82	14–14 (5–10)	Stroh Center (2,332); Bowling Green, OH
02/25/2016; 7:00 pm		at Akron	L 54–89	14–15 (5–11)	James A. Rhodes Arena (4,284); Akron, OH
03/01/2016; 7:00 pm, TWCSC/ESPN3		at Kent State	L 54–70	14–16 (5–12)	MAC Center (3,531); Kent, OH
03/04/2016; 7:00 pm, ESPN3		Buffalo	L 83–87	14–17 (5–13)	Stroh Center (2,189); Bowling Green, OH
MAC tournament
03/07/2016; 7:00 pm, ESPN3	(12)	at (5) Kent State; First round	W 70–69	15–17	MAC Center (2,660); Kent, OH
03/10/2016; 2:30 pm, ESPN3	(12)	vs. (4) Central Michigan; Quarterfinals	W 62–59	16–17	Quicken Loans Arena (2,217); Cleveland, OH
03/11/2016; 6:30 pm, ESPN3	(12)	vs. (1) Akron; Semifinals	L 66–80	16–18	Quicken Loans Arena (6,427); Cleveland, OH
*Non-conference game. ^{#}Rankings from AP Poll. (#) Tournament seedings in parentheses. All times are in Eastern Time.
