= 2015–16 Akron Zips men's basketball team =

American college basketball season

2015–16 Akron Zips men's basketball

South Point Holiday Hoops Classic champions MAC East Division Champions MAC Regular Season Champions

NIT, First round
- Conference: Mid-American Conference
- East Division
- Record: 26–9 (13–5 MAC)
- Head coach: Keith Dambrot (12th season)
- Assistant coach: Rick McFadden; Charles Thomas; Terry Weigand
- Home arena: James A. Rhodes Arena

2015–16 Mid-American Conference men's basketball standings
	Conf.				Overall
Team	W		L	PCT	W		L	PCT
East
Akron	13	–	5	.722	26	–	9	.743
Ohio	11	–	7	.611	23	–	12	.657
Kent State	10	–	8	.556	19	–	13	.594
Buffalo †	10	–	8	.556	20	–	15	.571
Miami (OH)	6	–	12	.333	13	–	20	.394
Bowling Green	5	–	13	.278	16	–	18	.471
West
Ball State	10	–	8	.556	21	–	14	.600
Central Michigan	10	–	8	.556	17	–	16	.515
Northern Illinois	9	–	9	.500	21	–	13	.618
Eastern Michigan	9	–	9	.500	18	–	15	.545
Toledo	8	–	10	.444	17	–	15	.531
Western Michigan	7	–	11	.389	13	–	19	.406
† 2016 MAC tournament winner

The 2015–16 Akron Zips men's basketball team represented the University of Akron during the 2015–16 NCAA Division I men's basketball season. The Zips, led by 12th year head coach Keith Dambrot, played their home games at the James A. Rhodes Arena as members of the East Division of the Mid-American Conference. Akron finished the season 26–9, 13–5 record in conference, winning the East Division title as well as the overall regular season MAC championship. The Zips advanced to the championship of the MAC tournament where they lost to Buffalo. As a regular season conference champion who failed to win their conference title, they received an automatic bid to the National Invitation Tournament where they lost to Ohio State in the first round.

== Previous season ==
The Zips finished the 2014–15 season with a 21–14 record, 9–9 in MAC play to finish in fourth place in the East Division. They advanced to the semifinals of the MAC tournament where they lost to Buffalo.

== Departures ==
Name	Number	Pos.	Height	Weight	Year	Hometown	Notes
Demetrius Treadwell	1	F	6'7"	236	Senior	Euclid, OH	Graduated
Nyles Evans	3	G	5'11"	160	Senior	North Canton, OH	Graduated
Deji Ibitayo	4	G	6'4"	200	Senior	Chicago, IL	Graduated
B. J. Gladden	5	G/F	6'6"	214	Sophomore	Charlotte, NC	Transferred to Eastern Florida State College

=== Incoming transfers ===
Name	Number	Pos.	Height	Weight	Year	Hometown	Previous School
Craig Eubanks		G	6'4"	190	Junior	Cleveland, OH	Junior college transferred from Missouri State University–West Plains.

== Recruiting class of 2015 ==
College recruiting information
Name	Hometown	School	Height	Weight	Commit date
Josh Williams; SG	Akron, OH	St. Vincent-St. Mary High School	6 ft 2 in (1.88 m)	175 lb (79 kg)	Aug 7, 2013
Josh Williams; SG	Recruit ratings: Scout: Rivals: (77)				
Peter Agba; PF	Greensboro, NC	Greensboro Day School	6 ft 6 in (1.98 m)	N/A	Sep 22, 2014
Peter Agba; PF	Recruit ratings: Scout: Rivals: (NR)				
Emmanuel Olojakpoke; PF	Houston, TX	Cypress Springs High School	6 ft 8 in (2.03 m)	190 lb (86 kg)	
Emmanuel Olojakpoke; PF	Recruit ratings: Scout: Rivals: (NR)				
Daniel Utomi; PF	Houston, TX	Westside High School	6 ft 6 in (1.98 m)	N/A	Apr 9, 2015
Daniel Utomi; PF	Recruit ratings: Scout: Rivals: (NR)				
Overall recruit ranking:
Note: In many cases, Scout, Rivals, 247Sports, On3, and ESPN may conflict in their listings of height and weight.; In these cases, the average was taken. ESPN grades are on a 100-point scale.; Sources: "2015 Team Ranking". Rivals.

=== Recruiting class of 2016 ===
College recruiting information (2016)
Name	Hometown	School	Height	Weight	Commit date
Isaiah Williams; SF	Dayton, OH	Stivers School for the Arts	6 ft 5 in (1.96 m)	210 lb (95 kg)	Mar 1, 2015
Isaiah Williams; SF	Recruit ratings: Scout: Rivals: (NR)				
Tavian Dunn-Martin; PG	Huntington, WV	Huntington High School	5 ft 8 in (1.73 m)	155 lb (70 kg)	Aug 4, 2015
Tavian Dunn-Martin; PG	Recruit ratings: Scout: Rivals: (NR)				
Overall recruit ranking:
Note: In many cases, Scout, Rivals, 247Sports, On3, and ESPN may conflict in their listings of height and weight.; In these cases, the average was taken. ESPN grades are on a 100-point scale.; Sources: "2016 Team Ranking". Rivals.

== Roster ==
2015–16 Akron Zips men's basketball team
Players
Coaches

Pos.	#	Name	Height	Weight	Year	Previous school	Hometown
G	0	Jimond Ivey	6 ft 4 in (1.93 m)	195 lb (88 kg)	So	Glenville HS/Ginn Academy	Cleveland, OH
G	1	Josh Williams	6 ft 2 in (1.88 m)	185 lb (84 kg)	Fr	St. Vincent-St. Mary High School HS	Akron, OH
F	2	Kwan Cheatham	6 ft 10 in (2.08 m)	235 lb (107 kg)	Jr	Winton Woods HS	Cincinnati, OH
G/F	3	Daniel Utomi	6 ft 6 in (1.98 m)	215 lb (98 kg)	Fr	Westside HS	Houston, TX
G	11	Aaron Jackson	6 ft 8 in (2.03 m)	215 lb (98 kg)	RS So	Lincoln HS	Gahanna, OH
G	14	Noah Robotham	6 ft 1 in (1.85 m)	165 lb (75 kg)	So	Bishop Gorman	Las Vegas, NV
G/F	15	Jake Kretzer	6 ft 7 in (2.01 m)	216 lb (98 kg)	Sr	Waverly HS	Bainbridge, OH
F	21	Reggie McAdams	6 ft 7 in (2.01 m)	208 lb (94 kg)	Sr	Elida HS	Elida, OH
F	22	Emmanuel Olojakpoke	6 ft 7 in (2.01 m)	205 lb (93 kg)	Fr	Cypress Springs HS	Houston, TX
C	23	Isaiah Johnson	6 ft 10 in (2.08 m)	295 lb (134 kg)	Jr	Walnut Hills HS	Cincinnati, OH
C	34	Pat Forsythe	6 ft 11 in (2.11 m)	245 lb (111 kg)	RS Sr	Brunswick HS; West Virginia	Brunswick, OH
F	42	Peter Agba	6 ft 5 in (1.96 m)	210 lb (95 kg)	Fr	Greensboro Day School	Greensboro, NC
G	55	Antino Jackson	5 ft 11 in (1.8 m)	160 lb (73 kg)	So	Cypress Springs HS	Houston, TX

Head coach

- Keith Dambrot (Akron)

Assistant coach(es)

- Rick McFadden (Akron)
- Charles Thomas (Eastern Michigan)
- Terry Weigand (Ashland)

Legend

- (C) Team captain
- (S) Suspended
- (I) Ineligible
- (W) Walk-on
- Injured
- Current redshirt

Roster

== Schedule and results ==
Date time, TV	Rank^{#}	Opponent^{#}	Result	Record	Site (attendance) city, state
Exhibition
11/05/2015*; 7:00 pm		Malone	W 113–69		James A. Rhodes Arena (3,088); Akron, OH
Non-conference games
11/14/2015*; 9:00 pm		vs. Cleveland State; Coaches vs. Cancer Tip-Off	W 65–53	1–0	MAC Center (5,471); Kent, OH
11/16/2015*; 7:00 pm		Hiram	W 100–30	2–0	James A. Rhodes Arena (2,638); Akron, OH
11/18/2015*; 8:00 pm, SECN		at Arkansas; NIT Season Tip-Off	W 88–80	3–0	Bud Walton Arena (14,041); Fayetteville, AR
11/22/2015*; 4:30 pm, FS1		at No. 11 Villanova; NIT Season Tip-Off	L 56–75	3–1	The Pavilion (6,500); Villanova, PA
11/24/2015*; 8:00 pm, ESPN3		at Green Bay; NIT Season Tip-Off	L 63–66	3–2	Resch Center (2,230); Green Bay, WI
11/27/2015*; 7:00 pm		Charleston Southern; NIT Season Tip-Off	W 82–58	4–2	James A. Rhodes Arena (2,469); Akron, OH
12/02/2015*; 8:00 pm		Coppin State	W 77–71	5–2	James A. Rhodes Arena (2,903); Akron, OH
12/04/2015*; 7:00 pm		at Marshall	W 75–65	6–2	Cam Henderson Center (4,631); Huntington, WV
12/12/2015*; 7:00 pm		Bethune-Cookman	W 81–60	7–2	James A. Rhodes Arena (2,828); Akron, OH
12/21/2015*; 3:00 pm		vs. UC Santa Barbara; South Point Holiday Hoops Classic	W 84–70	8–2	South Point Arena (250); Enterprise, NV
12/23/2015*; 3:00 pm		vs. Iona; South Point Holiday Hoops Classic	W 78–64	9–2	South Point Arena (225); Enterprise, NV
12/30/2015*; 7:00 pm		South Carolina State	W 78–68	10–2	James A. Rhodes Arena (2,741); Akron, OH
01/02/2016*; 7:00 pm		Lipscomb	W 80–73	11–2	James A. Rhodes Arena (3,652); Akron, OH
MAC regular season
01/05/2016; 7:00 pm, ASN		at Buffalo	W 75–71	12–2 (1–0)	Alumni Arena (2,226); Amherst, NY
01/08/2016; 7:00 pm, ESPNU		Western Michigan	W 62–53	13–2 (2–0)	James A. Rhodes Arena (2,642); Akron, OH
01/12/2016; 7:00 pm		at Central Michigan	L 81–92	13–3 (2–1)	McGuirk Arena (2,260); Mount Pleasant, MI
01/15/2016; 7:00 pm, CBSSN		at Toledo	L 64–78	13–4 (2–2)	Savage Arena (5,130); Toledo, OH
01/19/2016; 7:00 pm		Eastern Michigan	W 92–88	14–4 (3–2)	James A. Rhodes Arena (2,839); Akron, OH
01/23/2016; 7:00 pm		Miami (OH)	W 75–46	15–4 (4–2)	James A. Rhodes Arena (3,686); Akron, OH
01/26/2016; 7:00 pm		Northern Illinois	W 76–66	16–4 (5–2)	James A. Rhodes Arena (3,205); Akron, OH
01/30/2016; 1:00 pm		at Ball State	W 73–64	17–6 (6–2)	John E. Worthen Arena (3,021); Muncie, IN
02/02/2016; 7:00 pm, TWCSC		at Ohio	W 80–68	18–4 (7–2)	Convocation Center (6,403); Athens, OH
02/06/2016		Central Michigan	W 92–87	19–4 (8–2)	James A. Rhodes Arena (3,829); Akron, OH
02/09/2016; 7:00 pm		at Bowling Green	W 83–68	20–4 (8–2)	Stroh Center (1,554); Bowling Green, OH
02/13/2016; 4:45 pm, ESPN3		at Northern Illinois	L 79–80	20–5 (9–3)	Convocation Center (3,457); DeKalb, IL
02/16/2016; 7:00 pm		Buffalo	W 80–70	21–5 (10–3)	James A. Rhodes Arena (3,069); Akron, OH
02/19/2016; 6:00 pm, ESPNU		at Kent State; Wagon Wheel Challenge	L 76–85	21–6 (10–4)	MAC Center (6,327); Kent, OH
02/23/2016; 7:00 pm, ASN		at Miami (OH)	L 64–77	21–7 (10–5)	Millett Hall (1,371); Oxford, OH
02/25/2016		Bowling Green	W 78–54	22–7 (11–5)	James A. Rhodes Arena (4,284); Akron, OH
03/01/2016; 8:00 pm, ASN		Ohio	W 91–76	23–7 (12–5)	James A. Rhodes Arena (4,192); Akron, OH
03/04/2016; 7:00 pm, ESPN2		Kent State	W 74–60	24–7 (13–5)	James A. Rhodes Arena (5,301); Akron, OH
MAC tournament
03/10/2016; 12:00 pm, TWCSC/ESPN3		vs. Eastern Michigan; Quarterfinals	W 65–63	25–7	Quicken Loans Arena (2,217); Cleveland, OH
03/11/2016; 9:00 pm, TWCSC/ESPN3		vs. Bowling Green; Semifinals	W 80–66	26–7	Quicken Loans Arena (6,427); Cleveland, OH
03/12/2016; 7:30 pm, ESPN2		vs. Buffalo; Championship game	L 61–64	26–8	Quicken Loans Arena (6,719); Cleveland, OH
NIT
03/15/2016*; 7:00 pm, ESPN	(6)	at (3) Ohio State; First round – Monmouth Bracket	L 63–72 ^{OT}	26–9	Value City Arena (4,698); Columbus, OH
*Non-conference game. ^{#}Rankings from AP Poll. (#) Tournament seedings in parentheses. All times are in Eastern.
