= 2015–16 Buffalo Bulls men's basketball team =

American college basketball season

2015–16 Buffalo Bulls men's basketball

MAC tournament champions

NCAA tournament, First Round
- Conference: Mid-American Conference
- East Division
- Record: 20–15 (10–8 MAC)
- Head coach: Nate Oats (1st season)
- Assistant coaches: Jim Whitesell (1st season); Bryan Hodgson (1st season); Donyell Marshall (1st season)
- Home arena: Alumni Arena

2015–16 Mid-American Conference men's basketball standings
	Conf.				Overall
Team	W		L	PCT	W		L	PCT
East
Akron	13	–	5	.722	26	–	9	.743
Ohio	11	–	7	.611	23	–	12	.657
Kent State	10	–	8	.556	19	–	13	.594
Buffalo †	10	–	8	.556	20	–	15	.571
Miami (OH)	6	–	12	.333	13	–	20	.394
Bowling Green	5	–	13	.278	16	–	18	.471
West
Ball State	10	–	8	.556	21	–	14	.600
Central Michigan	10	–	8	.556	17	–	16	.515
Northern Illinois	9	–	9	.500	21	–	13	.618
Eastern Michigan	9	–	9	.500	18	–	15	.545
Toledo	8	–	10	.444	17	–	15	.531
Western Michigan	7	–	11	.389	13	–	19	.406
† 2016 MAC tournament winner

The 2015–16 Buffalo Bulls men's basketball team represented the University at Buffalo during the 2015–16 NCAA Division I men's basketball season. The Bulls, led by first-year head coach Nate Oats, played their home games at Alumni Arena as members of the East Division of the Mid-American Conference. They finished the season 20–15, 10–8 in MAC play to finish in a tie for third place in the East Division and third place overall. They defeated Miami (OH), Ohio, and Akron to be champions of the MAC tournament and earn the conference's automatic bid to the NCAA tournament. In their second consecutive trip to the NCAA Tournament, they lost to Miami (FL) in the first round.

== Previous season ==
The Bulls finished the 2014–15 season 23–10, 12–6 in MAC play to be co–champions of the East Division and co–champions of the MAC overall regular season. They defeated Akron and Central Michigan to become champions of the MAC tournament. They received an automatic bid to the NCAA tournament, their first NCAA Tournament bid in school history, where they lost in the second round to West Virginia.

== Departures ==
Name	Number	Pos.	Height	Weight	Year	Hometown	Reason for departure
Will Regan	2	F	6'8"	230	Senior	Buffalo, NY	Graduated
Bobby Frasco	3	G	6'4"	185	Freshman	Mount Prospect, IL	Transferred to Quincy University
Shannon Evans	11	G	6'1"	170	Sophomore	Suffolk, VA	Transferred to Arizona State
Justin Moss	23	F	6'7"	240	Junior	Detroit, MI	Dismissed from the team due violation of team rules
Xavier Ford	35	F	6'7"	210	Senior	Colorado Springs, CO	Graduated

=== Incoming transfers ===
Name	Number	Pos.	Height	Weight	Year	Hometown	Previous school
Blake Hamilton	0	G	6'6"	205	Junior	Pasadena, CA	Junior college, transferred from Mt. San Antonio College
Willie Conner III	2	G	6'5"	185	Junior	Chicago, IL	Junior college, transferred from Angelina College
David Kadiri	4	F	6'8"	190	Junior	Fort Washington, MD	Junior college, transferred from South Plains College

== Recruiting class of 2015 ==
College recruiting
Name	Hometown	School	Height	Weight	Commit date
Nick Perkins; PF	Ypsilanti, MI	Milan High School	6 ft 8 in (2.03 m)	N/A	Sep 24, 2014
Nick Perkins; PF	Recruit ratings: Scout: Rivals: (NR)				
C. J. Massinburg; SG	Dallas, TX	South Oak Cliff High School	6 ft 3 in (1.91 m)	N/A	
C. J. Massinburg; SG	Recruit ratings: Scout: Rivals: (NR)				
Overall recruit ranking:
Note: In many cases, Scout, Rivals, 247Sports, On3, and ESPN may conflict in their listings of height and weight.; In these cases, the average was taken. ESPN grades are on a 100-point scale.; Sources: "2015 Team Ranking". Rivals.

=== Recruiting class of 2016 ===
College recruiting (2016)
Name	Hometown	School	Height	Weight	Commit date
Quate McKinzie #39 PF	Burgaw, NC	Pender High School	6 ft 7 in (2.01 m)	195 lb (88 kg)	Sep 14, 2015
Quate McKinzie #39 PF	Recruit ratings: Scout: Rivals: (77)				
Evan Clayborne; PF	Dayton, OH	Thurgood Marshall High School	6 ft 7 in (2.01 m)	220 lb (100 kg)	Jun 29, 2015
Evan Clayborne; PF	Recruit ratings: Scout: Rivals: (NR)				
Overall recruit ranking:
Note: In many cases, Scout, Rivals, 247Sports, On3, and ESPN may conflict in their listings of height and weight.; In these cases, the average was taken. ESPN grades are on a 100-point scale.; Sources: "2016 Team Ranking". Rivals.

== Roster ==
2015–16 Buffalo Bulls men's basketball team
Players
Coaches

Pos.	#	Name	Height	Weight	Year	Previous school	Hometown
G/F	0	Blake Hamilton	6 ft 6 in (1.98 m)	205 lb (93 kg)	Jr	Pasadena HS; Mt. San Antonio College	Pasadena, CA
G	1	Lamonte Bearden	6 ft 3 in (1.91 m)	160 lb (73 kg)	So	Germantown HS	Milwaukee, WI
G/F	2	Willie Conner	6 ft 5 in (1.96 m)	200 lb (91 kg)	Jr	Richard T. Crane HS; Angelina College	Chicago, IL
G	3	C. J. Massinburg	6 ft 3 in (1.91 m)	170 lb (77 kg)	Fr	South Oak Cliff HS	Dallas, TX
F	4	David Kadiri	6 ft 8 in (2.03 m)	210 lb (95 kg)	Jr	Coolidge HS; South Plains College	Laurel, MD
G	5	Mory Diane	6 ft 3 in (1.91 m)	175 lb (79 kg)	So	Pershing HS	Detroit, MI
G	10	Jarryn Skeete	6 ft 3 in (1.91 m)	185 lb (84 kg)	Sr	Wasatch Academy; Bridgton Academy	Brampton, ON
G	15	Zac DiSalvo	5 ft 11 in (1.8 m)	165 lb (75 kg)	Fr	Greece Athena HS	Rochester, NY
G/F	20	Rodell Wigginton	6 ft 5 in (1.96 m)	215 lb (98 kg)	Sr	Lee Academy; College of Central Florida	Dartmouth, NS
G/F	21	Nikola Rakićević	6 ft 5 in (1.96 m)	185 lb (84 kg)	Fr	E-Gimnazija Novi Sad	Smederevska Palanka, Serbia
G	24	Christian Pino	5 ft 7 in (1.7 m)	145 lb (66 kg)	RS So	Romulus HS; Arizona State	Detroit, MI
F	31	Raheem Johnson	6 ft 10 in (2.08 m)	235 lb (107 kg)	Sr	Romulus HS; Barton CC	Detroit, MI
F	33	Nick Perkins	6 ft 8 in (2.03 m)	225 lb (102 kg)	Fr	Milan HS	Ypsilanti, MI
F	34	Ikenna Smart	6 ft 10 in (2.08 m)	235 lb (107 kg)	RS Fr	New Garden Friends School	Greensboro, NC
G	35	Tyler Moffe	6 ft 1 in (1.85 m)	168 lb (76 kg)	Fr	Elmira HS	Elmira, NY

Head coach

- Nate Oats (Maranatha Baptist)

Assistant coach(es)

- Jim Whitesell (Luther)
- Donyell Marshall (Connecticut)
- Bryan Hodgson (Fredonia State)

Legend

- (C) Team captain
- (S) Suspended
- (I) Ineligible
- (W) Walk-on
- Injured
- Current redshirt

Roster

== Schedule ==
Date time, TV	Rank^{#}	Opponent^{#}	Result	Record	High points	High rebounds	High assists	Site (attendance) city, state
Exhibition
11/06/2015*; 9:00 pm		Daemen	W 87–68		25 – Massinburg	11 – Smart	5 – Bearden	Alumni Arena (3,257); Amherst, NY
Non-conference regular season
11/13/2015*; 9:00 pm		Pittsburgh–Bradford	W 109–49	1–0	25 – Wigginton	10 – Wigginton	4 – Bearden	Alumni Arena (3,112); Amherst, NY
11/16/2015*; 7:00 pm		at Old Dominion; Hall of Fame Tip Off	L 58–77	1–1	12 – Skeete	5 – Tied	2 – Massinburg	Ted Constant Convocation Center (6,906); Norfolk, VA
11/18/2015*; 7:00 pm		at Saint Joseph's; Hall of Fame Tip Off	L 67–89	1–2	14 – Hamilton	7 – Hamilton	4 – Skeete	Hagan Arena (3,451); Philadelphia, PA
11/21/2015*; 7:30 pm		vs. North Carolina A&T; Hall of Fame Tip Off	W 86–68	2–2	19 – Wigginton	11 – Wigginton	5 – Wigginton	Mohegan Sun Arena (4,507); Uncasville, CT
11/22/2015*; 8:00 pm		vs. Vermont; Hall of Fame Tip Off	W 77–71	3–2	20 – Bearden	7 – Hamilton	4 – Bearden	Mohegan Sun Arena (3,813); Uncasville, CT
11/28/2015*; 2:00 pm		Canisius	W 98–96 ^{OT}	4–2	18 – Bearden	8 – Wigginton	5 – Bearden	Alumni Arena (3,112); Amherst, NY
12/02/2015*; 7:00 pm		St. Bonaventure	L 58–60	4–3	16 – Wigginton	10 – Wigginton	2 – Wigginton	Alumni Arena (4,192); Amherst, NY
12/05/2015*; 5:15 pm, ESPN2		at No. 7 Duke	L 59–82	4–4	17 – Massinburg	9 – Smart	3 – Bearden	Cameron Indoor Stadium (9,314); Durham, NC
12/07/2015*; 9:00 pm, ESPNU		at No. 4 Iowa State	L 63–84	4–5	16 – Skeete	4 – Tied	3 – Bearden	Hilton Coliseum (14,130); Ames, IA
12/12/2015*; 2:00 pm		Binghamton	W 80–64	5–5	17 – Massinburg	11 – Wigginton	8 – Hamilton	Alumni Arena (3,031); Amherst, NY
12/19/2015*; 2:00 pm		Montana State	W 80–73	6–5	18 – Bearden	8 – Wigginton	4 – Bearden	Alumni Arena (2,384); Amherst, NY
12/22/2015*; 7:00 pm, CSNMA		at VCU	L 69–90	6–6	17 – Wigginton	9 – Wigginton	4 – Massinburg	Siegel Center (7,637); Richmond, VA
12/29/2015*; 7:00 pm		Delaware	W 99–79	7–6	23 – Connor	7 – Tied	6 – Connor	Alumni Arena (3,212); Amherst, NY
MAC regular season
01/05/2016; 7:00 pm, ASN/ESPN3		Akron	L 71–75	7–7 (0–1)	16 – Connor	7 – Connor	3 – Hamilton	Alumni Arena (2,226); Amherst, NY
01/08/2016; 7:00 pm, CBSSN		at Kent State	W 76–67	8–7 (1–1)	22 – Connor	8 – Wigginton	8 – Bearden	MAC Center (3,522); Kent, OH
01/12/2016; 7:00 pm, ESPN3		at Eastern Michigan	L 69-81	8-8 (1-2)	16 – Hamilton	13 – Perkins	2 – Tied	Convocation Center (1333); Ypsilanti, MI
01/16/2016; 3:30 pm, ESPN3		Central Michigan	W 74-61	9-8 (2-2)	14 – Hamilton	9 – Hamilton	12 – Skeete	Alumni Arena (3,547); Amherst, NY
01/19/2016; 7:00 pm, ESPN3		at Miami (OH)	W 77–60	10–8 (3–2)	22 – Hamilton	10 – Smart	4 – Tied	Millett Hall (1,221); Oxford, OH
01/23/2016; 4:35 pm		at Western Michigan	L 71–91	10–9 (3–3)	17 – Connor	8 – Hamilton	4 – Skeete	University Arena (3,079); Kalamazoo, MI
01/26/2016; 7:00 pm		Ball State	W 76–64	11–9 (4–3)	18 – Bearden	9 – Hamilton	6 – Tied	Alumni Arena (3,522); Amherst, NY
01/30/2016; 7:00 pm		at Toledo	W 73–68	12–9 (5–3)	17 – Hamilton	8 – Wigginton	3 – Tied	Savage Arena (5,041); Toledo, OH
02/02/2016; 9:00 pm, ASN/ESPN3		at Northern Illinois	W 90–78	13–9 (6–3)	23 – Bearden	7 – Tied	7 – Bearden	Convocation Center (1,494); DeKalb, IL
02/06/2016; 3:30 pm		Eastern Michigan	W 80–70	14–9 (7–3)	14 – Tied	9 – Hamilton	4 – Tied	Alumni Arena (3,417); Amherst, NY
02/09/2016; 7:00 pm, TWCSC/ESPN3		Toledo	L 69–71	14–10 (7–4)	17 – Perkins	6 – Perkins	8 – Hamilton	Alumni Arena (2,706); Amherst, NY
02/13/2016; 2:00 pm, ESPNU		Ohio	L 75–94	14–11 (7–5)	36 – Massinburg	6 – Hamilton	4 – Hamilton	Alumni Arena (2,702); Amherst, NY
02/16/2016; 7:00 pm		at Akron	L 70–80	14–12 (7–6)	21 – Massinburg	8 – Hamilton	3 – Hamilton	James A. Rhodes Arena (3,069); Akron, OH
02/20/2016; 12:00 pm		Bowling Green	W 88–74	15–12 (8–6)	24 – Hamilton	7 – Hamilton	6 – Bearden	Alumni Arena (3,397); Amherst, NY
02/23/2016; 6:00 pm, TWCSC/ESPN3		Kent State	W 87–70	16–12 (9–6)	21 – Massinburg	7 – Smart	8 – Bearden	Alumni Arena (3,284); Amherst, NY
02/27/2016; 3:30 pm		at Ohio	L 96–103 ^{OT}	16–13 (9–7)	28 – Connor	11 – Hamilton	4 – Bearden	Convocation Center (7,221); Athens, OH
03/01/2016; 7:00 pm		Miami (OH)	L 59–67	16–14 (9–8)	20 – Hamilton	13 – Hamilton	7 – Bearden	Alumni Arena (4,798); Amherst, NY
03/04/2016; 7:00 pm		at Bowling Green	W 87–83	17–14 (10–8)	20 – Tied	5 – Tied	4 – Bearden	Stroh Center (2,189); Bowling Green, OH
MAC Tournament
03/10/2016; 9:00 pm, ESPN3	(3)	vs. (11) Miami (OH); Quarterfinals	W 94–81	18–14	25 – Connor	16 – Hamilton	7 – Hamilton	Quicken Loans Arena (2,311); Cleveland, OH
03/11/2016; 9:00 pm	(3)	vs. (2) Ohio; Semifinals	W 88–74	19–14	22 – Connor	9 – Tied	9 – Bearden	Quicken Loans Arena (6,427); Cleveland, OH
03/12/2016; 7:30 pm, ESPN2	(3)	vs. (1) Akron; Championship	W 64–61	20–14	18 – Massinburg	11 – Hamilton	6 – Bearden	Quicken Loans Arena (6,719); Cleveland, OH
NCAA tournament
03/17/2016*; 6:50 pm, TNT	(14 S)	vs. (3 S) No. 11 Miami (FL); First Round	L 72–79	20–15	20 – Perkins	9 – Hamilton	3 – Bearden	Dunkin' Donuts Center (11,559); Providence, RI
*Non-conference game. ^{#}Rankings from AP Poll. (#) Tournament seedings in parentheses. S=South Region. All times are in Eastern Time.
