= 2015–16 Central Michigan Chippewas men's basketball team =

American college basketball season

2015–16 Central Michigan Chippewas men's basketball

MAC West Division co–champions

CIT, First round
- Conference: Mid-American Conference
- West Division
- Record: 17–16 (10–8 MAC)
- Head coach: Keno Davis (4th season)
- Assistant coach: Kevin Gamble; Kyle Gerdeman; Jeff Smith
- Home arena: McGuirk Arena

2015–16 Mid-American Conference men's basketball standings
	Conf.				Overall
Team	W		L	PCT	W		L	PCT
East
Akron	13	–	5	.722	26	–	9	.743
Ohio	11	–	7	.611	23	–	12	.657
Kent State	10	–	8	.556	19	–	13	.594
Buffalo †	10	–	8	.556	20	–	15	.571
Miami (OH)	6	–	12	.333	13	–	20	.394
Bowling Green	5	–	13	.278	16	–	18	.471
West
Ball State	10	–	8	.556	21	–	14	.600
Central Michigan	10	–	8	.556	17	–	16	.515
Northern Illinois	9	–	9	.500	21	–	13	.618
Eastern Michigan	9	–	9	.500	18	–	15	.545
Toledo	8	–	10	.444	17	–	15	.531
Western Michigan	7	–	11	.389	13	–	19	.406
† 2016 MAC tournament winner

The 2015–16 Central Michigan Chippewas men's basketball team represented Central Michigan University during the 2015–16 NCAA Division I men's basketball season. The Chippewas, led by fourth year head coach Keno Davis, played their home games at McGuirk Arena as members of the West Division of the Mid-American Conference. They finished the season 17–16, 10–8 in MAC play to finish in a tie for the West Division championship. They lost in the quarterfinals of the MAC tournament to Bowling Green. They were invited to the CollegeInsider.com Tournament where they lost in the first round to Tennessee–Martin.

== Previous season ==
The Chippewas finished the season 23–9, 12–6 in MAC play to be champions of the West Division and share the overall MAC regular season championship with Buffalo. They advanced to the championship game of the MAC tournament where they lost to Buffalo. As a conference champion, and #1 seed in their conference tournament, who failed to win their conference tournament they received an automatic bid to the National Invitation Tournament where they lost in the first round to Louisiana Tech.

== Departures ==
Name	Number	Pos.	Height	Weight	Year	Hometown	Notes
Spencer Krannitz	1	G/F	6'4"	202	Junior	North Muskegon, Michigan	Transferred to Fresno Pacific
Derrick Richardson, Jr.	3	G	6'4"	200	Junior	Ypsilanti, Michigan	Transferred
Filip Medjo	13	G	6'3"	210	Freshman	Belgrade, Serbia	Transferred to Pensacola State College
Austin Keel	30	G	6'3"	182	Senior	Winter Springs, Florida	Graduated

== Recruiting class of 2015 ==
College recruiting information
Name	Hometown	School	Height	Weight	Commit date
Corey Redman; SG	Boyne City, Michigan	Boyne City High School	6 ft 4 in (1.93 m)	180 lb (82 kg)	Aug 3, 2012
Corey Redman; SG	Recruit ratings: Scout: Rivals: (NR)				
Overall recruit ranking:
Note: In many cases, Scout, Rivals, 247Sports, On3, and ESPN may conflict in their listings of height and weight.; In these cases, the average was taken. ESPN grades are on a 100-point scale.; Sources: "2015 Team Ranking". Rivals.

=== Recruiting class of 2016 ===
College recruiting information (2016)
Name	Hometown	School	Height	Weight	Commit date
Innocent Nwoko; C	New Haven, Michigan	New Haven High School	6 ft 11 in (2.11 m)	N/A	Sep 14, 2014
Innocent Nwoko; C	Recruit ratings: Scout: Rivals: (NR)				
Matty Smith; PG	South Elgin, Illinois	South Elgin High School	6 ft 0 in (1.83 m)	N/A	Apr 26, 2015
Matty Smith; PG	Recruit ratings: Scout: Rivals: (NR)				
Ellis Jefferson; PG	San Antonio, Texas	Brandeis High School	6 ft 0 in (1.83 m)	N/A	Sep 3, 2015
Ellis Jefferson; PG	Recruit ratings: Scout: Rivals: (NR)				
Overall recruit ranking:
Note: In many cases, Scout, Rivals, 247Sports, On3, and ESPN may conflict in their listings of height and weight.; In these cases, the average was taken. ESPN grades are on a 100-point scale.; Sources: "2016 Team Ranking". Rivals.

== Roster ==
2015–16 Central Michigan Chippewas men's basketball team
Players
Coaches

Pos.	#	Name	Height	Weight	Year	Previous school	Hometown
G	0	Tanner Beachnau (W)	6 ft 0 in (1.83 m)	180 lb (82 kg)	Jr	Holt HS	Holt, Michigan
G	1	Corey Redman	6 ft 6 in (1.98 m)	185 lb (84 kg)	Fr	Boyne City HS	Boyne City, Michigan
G	2	Braylon Rayson	5 ft 9 in (1.75 m)	190 lb (86 kg)	Jr	West Mesquite HS	Dallas
G	4	Rayshawn Simmons (C)	6 ft 4 in (1.93 m)	185 lb (84 kg)	Sr	Moberly Area CC	St. Louis, Missouri
G	5	Janeau Joubert (W)	6 ft 1 in (1.85 m)	160 lb (73 kg)	Fr	Ypsilanti HS	Belleville, Michigan
G	10	Austin Stewart	6 ft 6 in (1.98 m)	215 lb (98 kg)	Sr	West HS	Normal, Illinois
C	11	Milos Cabarkapa	7 ft 0 in (2.13 m)	245 lb (111 kg)	RS So	Impact Academy	Belgrade, Serbia
G	12	Josh Kozinski	6 ft 4 in (1.93 m)	185 lb (84 kg)	RS So	Edwardsburg HS	Edwardsburg, Michigan
G	15	Chris Fowler (C)	6 ft 1 in (1.85 m)	195 lb (88 kg)	Sr	Detroit Country Day School	Southfield, Michigan
G	21	Hunter Hale (W)	6 ft 2 in (1.88 m)	165 lb (75 kg)	Fr	Kalamazoo Central HS	Kalamazoo, Michigan
G	22	Tedaro France III (W)	6 ft 0 in (1.83 m)	170 lb (77 kg)	Jr	New Haven HS	New Haven, Michigan
G	23	DaRohn Scott	6 ft 9 in (2.06 m)	230 lb (104 kg)	So	Grand Rapids Christian HS	Grand Rapids, Michigan
F	24	Luke Meyer	6 ft 11 in (2.11 m)	225 lb (102 kg)	So	Addison HS	Addison, Michigan
F	32	Blake Hibbitts	6 ft 7 in (2.01 m)	220 lb (100 kg)	Sr	Hudsonville HS	Hudsonville, Michigan
F	34	John Simons (C)	6 ft 8 in (2.03 m)	220 lb (100 kg)	Sr	Cadillac HS	Cadillac, Michigan
F	35	John McCarty (W)	6 ft 5 in (1.96 m)	210 lb (95 kg)	So	Lake Orion HS	Lake Orion, Michigan
C	55	Cole Israelson (W)	6 ft 9 in (2.06 m)	250 lb (113 kg)	RS So	Cass City HS	Cass City, Michigan

Head coach

- Keno Davis (Iowa)

Assistant coach(es)

- Kevin Gamble (Iowa)
- Jeff Smith (Southeast Missouri State)
- Kyle Gerdeman (Alma)

Legend

- (C) Team captain
- (S) Suspended
- (I) Ineligible
- (W) Walk-on
- Injured
- Current redshirt

Roster

== Schedule and results ==
Date time, TV	Rank^{#}	Opponent^{#}	Result	Record	Site (attendance) city, state
Exhibition
11/07/2015*; 4:30 pm		Ferris State	W 77–63	–	McGuirk Arena; Mount Pleasant, Michigan
Non-conference games
11/13/2015*; 4:30 pm, ESPN3		Jacksonville State	W 89–83	1–0	McGuirk Arena (3,116); Mount Pleasant, Michigan
11/17/2015*; 7:00 pm, CSN Digital		Alma; Gulf Coast Showcase Opening Round	W 79–64	2–0	McGuirk Arena (2,582); Mount Pleasant, Michigan
11/23/2015*; 8:30 pm		vs. Weber State; Gulf Coast Showcase quarterfinals	L 60–63	2–1	Germain Arena (523); Estero, Florida
11/24/2015*; 2:30 pm		vs. WKU; Gulf Coast Showcase consolation round	L 60–88	2–2	Germain Arena (823); Estero, Florida
11/25/2015*; 12:00 pm		vs. Milwaukee; Gulf Coast Showcase 7th place game	L 78–84	2–3	Germain Arena (1,077); Estero, Florida
11/30/2015*; 7:00 pm, ESPN3		McNeese State	W 74–73	3–3	McGuirk Arena (2,153); Mount Pleasant, Michigan
12/03/2015*; 9:00 pm, Cox 7		at Grand Canyon	L 72–75	3–4	GCU Arena (5,642); Phoenix, Arizona
12/07/2015*; 7:00 pm, CSN Digital		Aquinas	W 90–51	4–4	McGuirk Arena (2,318); Mount Pleasant, Michigan
12/12/2015*; 4:30 pm, ESPN3		Texas Southern	W 79–71	5–4	McGuirk Arena (2,492); Mount Pleasant, Michigan
12/18/2015*; 9:00 pm, BYUtv		at BYU	L 85-98	5–5	Marriott Center (13,408); Provo, Utah
12/22/2015*; 7:00 pm, ESPN3		Howard	W 72–52	6–5	McGuirk Arena (2,259); Mount Pleasant, Michigan
12/29/2015*; 7:30 pm		at William & Mary	L 84-88	6-6	Kaplan Arena (3313); Williamsburg, Virginia
12/31/2015*; 1:00 pm, CSN Digita		Lourdes	W 87–66	7–6	McGuirk Arena (1,901); Mount Pleasant, Michigan
Mid-American Conference games
01/06/2016; 7:00 pm, ESPN3		Eastern Michigan; Michigan MAC Trophy	L 80-99	7–7 (0–1)	McGuirk Arena (2,207); Mount Pleasant, Michigan
01/09/2016; 2:00 pm, ESPN3		at Bowling Green	W 79–67	8–7 (1–1)	Stroh Center (2,432); Bowling Green, Kentucky
01/12/2016; 7:00 pm, ESPN3/ASN		Akron	W 92–81	9–7 (2–1)	McGuirk Arena (2,260); Mount Pleasant, Michigan
01/16/2016; 3:30 pm, ESPN3		at Buffalo	L 6174	9–8 (2–2)	Alumni Arena (3,547); Amherst, New York
01/19/2016; 8:00 pm, ESPN3		at Northern Illinois	L 70–75	9–9 (2–3)	Convocation Center (1,497); DeKalb, Illinois
01/23/2016; 4:30 pm, ESPN3		Ohio	W 72–49	10–9 (3–3)	McGuirk Arena; Mount Pleasant, Michigan
01/26/2016; 7:00 pm		at Miami (OH)	W 68–51	11–9 (4–3)	Millett Hall (1,431); Oxford, Ohio
01/30/2016; 4:30 pm, ESPN3		Bowling Green	W 77–65	12–9 (5–3)	McGuirk Arena (3,758); Mount Pleasant, Michigan
02/02/2016; 7:00 pm, ESPN3/ASN		Kent State	W 88–61	13–9 (6–3)	McGuirk Arena (2,132); Mount Pleasant, Michigan
02/06/2016; 8:00 pm		at Akron	L 87–92	13–10 (6–4)	James A. Rhodes Arena (3,829); Akron, Ohio
02/09/2016; 7:00 pm		at Eastern Michigan; Michigan MAC Trophy	L 56–71	13–11 (6–5)	Convocation Center (1,233); Ypsilanti, Michigan
02/13/2016; 4:30 pm, ESPN3		Ball State	L 63–75	13–12 (6–6)	McGuirk Arena (3,351); Mount Pleasant, Michigan
02/16/2016; 7:00 pm, ESPN3/ASN		Toledo	W 77–69	14–12 (7–6)	McGuirk Arena (2,139); Mount Pleasant, Michigan
02/20/2016; 2:00 pm		at Western Michigan; Michigan MAC Trophy	L 85–92	14–13 (7–7)	University Arena (3,869); Kalamazoo, Michigan
02/23/2016; 7:00 pm, ESPN3		Northern Illinois	W 76–64	15–13 (8–7)	McGuirk Arena (2,371); Mount Pleasant, Michigan
02/27/2016; 7:00 pm		at Toledo	W 76–74	16–13 (9–7)	Savage Arena (5,629); Toledo, Ohio
03/01/2016; 7:00 pm		at Ball State	W 65–57	17–13 (10–7)	John E. Worthen Arena (2,738); Muncie, Indiana
03/04/2016; 7:00 pm, ESPN3		Western Michigan; Michigan MAC Trophy	L 82–91 ^{OT}	17–14 (10–8)	McGuirk Arena (3,292); Mount Pleasant, Michigan
MAC tournament
03/10/2016; 2:30 pm, ESPN3		vs. Bowling Green; Quarterfinals	L 59–62	17–15	Quicken Loans Arena (2,217); Cleveland, Ohio
CIT
03/16/2016*; 7:00 pm		Tennessee–Martin; First round	L 73–76	17–16	McGuirk Arena (832); Mount Pleasant, Michigan
*Non-conference game. ^{#}Rankings from AP Poll. (#) Tournament seedings in parentheses. All times are in Eastern.
