= 2015–16 Eastern Michigan Eagles men's basketball team =

American college basketball season

2015–16 Eastern Michigan Eagles men's basketball
- Conference: Mid-American Conference
- West Division
- Record: 18–15 (9–9 MAC)
- Head coach: Rob Murphy (5th season)
- Assistant coaches: Mike Brown; Kevin Mondro; Benny White
- Home arena: Convocation Center

2015–16 Mid-American Conference men's basketball standings
| | Conf. | | | | Overall |
| Team | W | | L | PCT | W | | L | PCT |
|---|---|---|---|---|---|---|---|---|
East
| Akron | 13 | – | 5 | .722 | 26 | – | 9 | .743 |
| Ohio | 11 | – | 7 | .611 | 23 | – | 12 | .657 |
| Kent State | 10 | – | 8 | .556 | 19 | – | 13 | .594 |
| Buffalo † | 10 | – | 8 | .556 | 20 | – | 15 | .571 |
| Miami (OH) | 6 | – | 12 | .333 | 13 | – | 20 | .394 |
| Bowling Green | 5 | – | 13 | .278 | 16 | – | 18 | .471 |
West
| Ball State | 10 | – | 8 | .556 | 21 | – | 14 | .600 |
| Central Michigan | 10 | – | 8 | .556 | 17 | – | 16 | .515 |
| Northern Illinois | 9 | – | 9 | .500 | 21 | – | 13 | .618 |
| Eastern Michigan | 9 | – | 9 | .500 | 18 | – | 15 | .545 |
| Toledo | 8 | – | 10 | .444 | 17 | – | 15 | .531 |
| Western Michigan | 7 | – | 11 | .389 | 13 | – | 19 | .406 |
† 2016 MAC tournament winner

The 2015–16 Eastern Michigan Eagles men's basketball team represented Eastern Michigan University during the 2015–16 NCAA Division I men's basketball season. The Eagles, led by fifth year head coach Rob Murphy, played their home games at the Convocation Center, as members of the West Division of the Mid-American Conference. They finished the season 18–15, 9–9 in MAC play to finish in a tie for third place in the West Division. They defeated Toledo in the first round of the MAC tournament to advance to the quarterfinals where they lost to Akron.

== Previous season ==
The Eagles finished the season 21–14, 8–10 in MAC play to finish in a tie for fourth place in the West Division. They advanced to the quarterfinals of the MAC tournament where they lost to Toledo. They were invited to the College Basketball Invitational where they lost in the first round to Louisiana–Monroe.

== Roster Changes ==
=== Departures ===
| Name | Number | Pos. | Height | Weight | Year | Hometown | Notes |
|---|---|---|---|---|---|---|---|
| Mike Talley | 1 | G | 6'0" | 176 | RS Senior | Detroit, MI | Graduated |
| Anali Okoloji | 3 | F | 6'8" | 232 | RS Senior | Brooklyn, NY | Graduated |
| Olalekan Ajayi | 12 | F/C | 6'11" | 245 | Junior | Winston-Salem, NC | Transferred to Cal State Northridge |
| Karrington Ward | 14 | F | 6'7" | 186 | Senior | Lockport, IL | Graduated |
| Ali Farhat | 20 | G | 6'0" | 160 | Sophomore | Dearborn, MI | Transferred to Wayne State |
| Jerome Hunter | 21 | F | 6'9" | 250 | RS Senior | Buffalo, NY | Graduated |
| Mike Samuels | 30 | C | 6'11" | 285 | RS Junior | Bushkill, PA | Graduated |

=== Incoming transfers ===
| Name | Number | Pos. | Height | Weight | Year | Hometown | Previous School |
|---|---|---|---|---|---|---|---|
| Willie Mangum | 10 | G | 6'1" | 200 | Junior | Richmond, VA | Junior college transferred from San Jacinto College |
| Quaran Jones | 21 | C | 6'6" | 230 | Junior | Detroit, MI | Transferred from Findlay. Under NCAA transfer rules, Jones will have to sit out for the 2015–16 season. Will have two years of remaining eligibility. |
| Ty Toney | 32 | G | 6'2" | 185 | Junior | Alpharetta, GA | Junior college transferred from Georgia Highlands College |
| Nick Madray | 35 | F | 6'9" | 215 | Junior | Mississauga, ON | Transferred from Binghamton. Under NCAA transfer rules, Madray will have to sit out for the 2015–16 season. Will have two years of remaining eligibility. |

== Recruiting class of 2015 ==
College recruiting information
| Name | Hometown | School | Height | Weight | Commit date |
|---|---|---|---|---|---|
| LaMonta Stone II #56 PG | River Rouge, MI | River Rouge High School | 5 ft 8 in (1.73 m) | 165 lb (75 kg) | Feb 21, 2014 |
| LaMonta Stone II #56 PG | Recruit ratings: Scout: Rivals: (75) | | | | |
Overall recruit ranking:
Note: In many cases, Scout, Rivals, 247Sports, On3, and ESPN may conflict in their listings of height and weight.; In these cases, the average was taken. ESPN grades are on a 100-point scale.; Sources: "2015 Team Ranking". Rivals.

== Preseason Accolades ==
Hustle Belt Top 25 Players

- #2 Raven Lee

West Division Preseason All-MAC

- Raven Lee

Lou Henson Preseason Player of the Year Award Watch List

- Raven Lee

== Roster ==
2015–16 Eastern Michigan Eagles men's basketball team
Players
Coaches

| Pos. | # | Name | Height | Weight | Year | Previous school | Hometown |
|---|---|---|---|---|---|---|---|
| G | 0 | Raven Lee | 6 ft 3 in (1.91 m) | 175 lb (79 kg) | RS Jr | Romulus | Detroit, MI |
| G | 1 | Tim Bond | 6 ft 7 in (2.01 m) | 160 lb (73 kg) | So | City College HS | Baltimore, MD |
| C | 2 | James Thompson IV | 6 ft 10 in (2.08 m) | 220 lb (100 kg) | Fr | Parkview Baptist | Baton Rouge, LA |
| G | 3 | LaMonta Stone II | 5 ft 9 in (1.75 m) | 160 lb (73 kg) | Fr | River Rouge | Bowling Green, OH |
| F | 4 | Brandon Nazione | 6 ft 8 in (2.03 m) | 225 lb (102 kg) | Sr | Howell; Des Moines Area CC | Howell, MI |
| G/F | 5 | Jodan Price | 6 ft 8 in (2.03 m) | 185 lb (84 kg) | RS Jr | Detroit Country Day; DePaul | Indianapolis, IN |
| G | 10 | Willie Mangum | 6 ft 1 in (1.85 m) | 180 lb (82 kg) | Jr | Marshall; San Jacinto College | Richmond, VA |
| G | 12 | Daryl Kirkland (W) | 6 ft 2 in (1.88 m) | 170 lb (77 kg) | Fr | Muskegon | Grand Rapids, MI |
| G | 13 | Trent Perry (W) | 6 ft 4 in (1.93 m) | 190 lb (86 kg) | RS So | Independence | Franklin, TN |
| F | 15 | Jordan Nobles | 6 ft 9 in (2.06 m) | 195 lb (88 kg) | RS Fr | Canton | Canton, MI |
| F | 21 | Quaran Jones (I) (redshirt) | 6 ft 6 in (1.98 m) | 225 lb (102 kg) | Jr | Ecrose; Findlay | Dearborn Heights, MI |
| G | 22 | Jordan Martin | 6 ft 3 in (1.91 m) | 195 lb (88 kg) | RS Sr | Chandler Park Academy; Oakland CC | Detroit, MI |
| G | 25 | Ethan Alvano | 6 ft 1 in (1.85 m) | 165 lb (75 kg) | So | Corona | Corona, CA |
| G | 32 | Ty Toney | 6 ft 2 in (1.88 m) | 225 lb (102 kg) | Jr | Alpharetta; Georgia Highlands College | Alpharetta, GA |
| F | 35 | Nick Madray (I) (redshirt) | 6 ft 9 in (2.06 m) | 225 lb (102 kg) | Jr | Stephen Lewis/Findlay Prep; Binghamton | Mississauga, ON |

Head coach

- Rob Murphy (Central State)

Assistant coach(es)

- Mike Brown (Wayne State (MI))
- Kevin Mondro (Detroit Mercy)
- Benny White (Michigan State)

Legend

- (C) Team captain
- (S) Suspended
- (I) Ineligible
- (W) Walk-on
- Injured
- Current redshirt

Roster

== Schedule ==
| Date time, TV | Rank^{#} | Opponent^{#} | Result | Record | Site (attendance) city, state |
Non-conference regular season
| 11/13/2015*; 11:04 am, ESPN3 | | Vermont | W 70–50 | 1–0 | Convocation Center (3,307); Ypsilanti, MI |
| 11/18/2015*; 7:05 pm, ESPN3 | | at Oakland | L 81–91 | 1–1 | Athletics Center O'rena (3,808); Rochester, MI |
| 11/21/2015*; 11:04 am, ESPN3 | | Siena Heights | W 79–34 | 2–1 | Convocation Center (1,135); Ypsilanti, MI |
| 11/23/2015*; 7:01 pm, BTN | | at No. 3 Michigan State | L 65–89 | 2–2 | Breslin Center (14,797); East Lansing, MI |
| 11/25/2015*; 2:00 pm, ESPN3 | | Marygrove | W 108–64 | 3–2 | Convocation Center (714); Ypsilanti, MI |
| 11/28/2015*; 2:04 pm, ESPN3 | | Madonna | W 79–63 | 4–2 | Convocation Center (626); Ypsilanti, MI |
| 12/01/2015*; 7:00 pm | | at Nebraska–Omaha | W 80–73 | 5–2 | Baxter Arena (1,739); Omaha, NE |
| 12/05/2015*; 12:01 pm, BTN | | at Penn State | L 70–81 | 5–3 | Bryce Jordan Center (10,303); University Park, PA |
| 12/08/2015*; 7:00 pm, ESPN3 | | Rochester College | W 86–58 | 6–3 | Convocation Center (729); Ypsilanti, MI |
| 12/12/2015*; 12:00 pm, RSN/ESPN3 | | at No. 19 Louisville | L 53–86 | 6–4 | KFC Yum! Center (20,649); Louisville, KY |
| 12/21/2015*; 7:00 pm | | at Coppin State | W 73–62 | 7–4 | Physical Education Complex (813); Baltimore, MD |
| 12/28/2015*; 7:00 pm, ESPN3 | | Detroit | W 88–73 | 8–4 | Convocation Center (1,415); Ypsilanti, MI |
| 01/02/2016*; 12:04 pm, ESPN3 | | North Florida | L 77-82 | 8–5 | Convocation Center (1,081); Ypsilanti, MI |
MAC regular season
| 01/06/2016; 7:00 pm, ESPN3 | | at Central Michigan; Michigan MAC Trophy | W 99–80 | 9–5 (1–0) | McGuirk Arena (2,207); Mount Pleasant, MI |
| 01/09/2016; 7:30 pm, ESPN3 | | at Northern Illinois | L 63–80 | 9–6 (1–1) | Convocation Center (1,349); DeKalb, IL |
| 01/12/2016; 7:04 pm, ESPN3 | | Buffalo | W 81–69 | 10–6 (2–1) | Convocation Center (1,333); Ypsilanti, MI |
| 01/16/2016; 12:00 pm, ESPN3 | | Bowling Green | L 79–84 | 10–7 (2–2) | Convocation Center (1,280); Ypsilanti, MI |
| 01/19/2016; 7:00 pm | | at Akron | L 88–92 | 10–8 (2–3) | James A. Rhodes Arena (2,839); Akron, OH |
| 01/23/2016; 12:00 pm, ESPN3 | | Ball State | L 87-88 ^{2OT} | 10-9 (2-4) | Convocation Center (1,067); Ypsilanti, MI |
| 01/26/2016; 7:00 pm | | at Kent State | L 58–73 | 10–10 (2–5) | MAC Center (3,858); Kent, OH |
| 01/30/2016; 2:00 pm | | at Western Michigan; Michigan MAC Trophy | L 86–94 | 10–11 (2–6) | University Arena (3,115); Kalamazoo, MI |
| 02/02/2016; 7:00 pm, ESPN3 | | Miami (OH) | W 94–69 | 11–11 (3–6) | Convocation Center (779); Ypsilanti, MI |
| 02/06/2016; 3:30 pm | | at Buffalo | L 70–80 | 11–12 (3–7) | Alumni Arena (3,417); Amherst, NY |
| 02/09/2016; 7:00 pm, ESPN3 | | Central Michigan; Michigan MAC Trophy | W 71–56 | 12–12 (4–7) | Convocation Center (1,233); Ypsilanti, MI |
| 02/13/2016; 12:00 pm, ESPN3 | | Kent State | W 75–70 | 13–12 (5–7) | Convocation Center (1,059); Ypsilanti, MI |
| 02/16/2016; 7:00 pm | | at Ohio | L 64–86 | 13–13 (5–8) | Convocation Center (6,212); Athens, OH |
| 02/20/2016; 12:00 pm, ESPN3 | | Toledo | W 91–85 | 14–13 (6–8) | Convocation Center (1,636); Ypsilanti, MI |
| 02/23/2016; 7:00 pm, ESPN3 | | Western Michigan; Michigan MAC Trophy | W 73–62 | 15–13 (7–8) | Convocation Center (928); Ypsilanti, MI |
| 02/27/2016; 2:00 pm | | at Ball State | L 79–115 | 15–14 (7–9) | John E. Worthen Arena (3,353); Muncie, IN |
| 03/01/2016; 7:00 pm, ESPN3 | | Northern Illinois | W 75–71 | 16–14 (8–9) | Convocation Center (993); Ypsilanti, MI |
| 03/04/2016; 7:00 pm | | at Toledo | W 75–71 | 17–14 (9–9) | Savage Arena (4,633); Toledo, OH |
MAC tournament
| 03/07/2016; 7:30 pm, ESPN3 | (8) | (9) Toledo | W 69–60 | 18–14 | Convocation Center (1,556); Ypsilanti, MI |
| 03/10/2016; 12:00 pm, TWCSC/ESPN3 | (8) | vs. (1) Akron | L 63–65 | 18–15 | Quicken Loans Arena (2,217); Cleveland, OH |
*Non-conference game. ^{#}Rankings from AP Poll. (#) Tournament seedings in parentheses. All times are in Eastern Time.
