= 2015–16 Western Michigan Broncos men's basketball team =

American college basketball season

2015–16 Western Michigan Broncos men's basketball
- Conference: Mid-American Conference
- West Division
- Record: 13–19 (7–11 MAC)
- Head coach: Steve Hawkins (13th season)
- Assistant coaches: Clayton Bates; Larry Farmer; James Holland
- Home arena: University Arena

2015–16 Mid-American Conference men's basketball standings
	Conf.				Overall
Team	W		L	PCT	W		L	PCT
East
Akron	13	–	5	.722	26	–	9	.743
Ohio	11	–	7	.611	23	–	12	.657
Kent State	10	–	8	.556	19	–	13	.594
Buffalo †	10	–	8	.556	20	–	15	.571
Miami (OH)	6	–	12	.333	13	–	20	.394
Bowling Green	5	–	13	.278	16	–	18	.471
West
Ball State	10	–	8	.556	21	–	14	.600
Central Michigan	10	–	8	.556	17	–	16	.515
Northern Illinois	9	–	9	.500	21	–	13	.618
Eastern Michigan	9	–	9	.500	18	–	15	.545
Toledo	8	–	10	.444	17	–	15	.531
Western Michigan	7	–	11	.389	13	–	19	.406
† 2016 MAC tournament winner

The 2015–16 Western Michigan Broncos men's basketball team represented Western Michigan University (WMU) during the 2015–16 NCAA Division I men's basketball season. The Broncos, led by 13th year head coach Steve Hawkins, played their home games at University Arena as members of the West Division of the Mid-American Conference (MAC). They finished the season 13–19 overall and 7–11 in MAC play to finish in last place in the West Division. They lost in the first round of the MAC tournament to Northern Illinois. WMU tied Eastern Michigan for the Michigan MAC Trophy with a 3–1 record. However, due to not having a clear winner, Central Michigan retained the trophy that they won in 2014–15.

== Previous season ==
The Broncos finished the season 20–14 (10–8 in the MAC) to finish in third place in the West Division. They advanced to the second round of the MAC tournament where they lost to Akron. They were invited to the CollegeInsider.com Tournament where they lost in the first round to Cleveland State.

== Departures ==
Name	Number	Position	Height	Weight	Year	Hometown	Notes
David Brown	5	G	6′ 4″	205	Senior (redshirt)	Roscoe, IL	Graduated
Bishop Robinson	11	G	6′ 3″	190	Freshman (redshirt)	Kalamazoo, MI	Transferred
Tim Brennan	20	G/F	6′ 5″	200	Senior	Chicago, IL	Graduated
Austin Richie	22	G	6′ 3″	185	Senior	Lowell, IN	Graduated
Von Washington	30	G	6′ 2″	175	Sophomore (redshirt)	Kalamazoo, MI	Transferred to Quincy
Mario Matasovic	31	F	6′ 8″	215	Sophomore	Croatia	Transferred to Sacred Heart
Charles Harris	35	G/F	6′ 5″	195	Sophomore (redshirt)	Antioch, IL	Transferred

== Recruiting class of 2015 ==
College recruiting information
Name	Hometown	School	Height	Weight	Commit date
Seth Dugan; C	Otsego, MI	Otsego High School	6 ft 11 in (2.11 m)	230 lb (100 kg)	Nov 18, 2014
Seth Dugan; C	Recruit ratings: Scout: Rivals: (78)				
Josh Davis; SG	Detroit, MI	Henry Ford High School	6 ft 5 in (1.96 m)	175 lb (79 kg)	Sep 10, 2014
Josh Davis; SG	Recruit ratings: Scout: Rivals: (NR)				
Bryce Moore; PG	Indianapolis, IN	Park Tudor School	6 ft 2 in (1.88 m)	200 lb (91 kg)	Nov 19, 2014
Bryce Moore; PG	Recruit ratings: Scout: Rivals: (NR)				
Overall recruit ranking:
Note: In many cases, Scout, Rivals, 247Sports, On3, and ESPN may conflict in their listings of height and weight.; In these cases, the average was taken. ESPN grades are on a 100-point scale.; Sources: "2015 Western Michigan Basketball Commits". Rivals.; "2015 Western Michigan Basketball Commits". Scout.; "2015 Western Michigan Basketball Commits". ESPN.; "Scout.com Team Recruiting Rankings". Scout.; "2015 Team Ranking". Rivals.

=== Recruiting class of 2016 ===
College recruiting information (2016)
Name	Hometown	School	Height	Weight	Commit date
Jarrin Randall; PG	Chicago, IL	Morgan Park High School	6 ft 0 in (1.83 m)	165 lb (75 kg)	Sep 6, 2015
Jarrin Randall; PG	Recruit ratings: Scout: Rivals: (NR)				
Overall recruit ranking:
Note: In many cases, Scout, Rivals, 247Sports, On3, and ESPN may conflict in their listings of height and weight.; In these cases, the average was taken. ESPN grades are on a 100-point scale.; Sources: "2016 Western Michigan Basketball Commits". Rivals.; "2016 Western Michigan Basketball Commits". Scout.; "2016 Western Michigan Basketball Commits". ESPN.; "Scout.com Team Recruiting Rankings". Scout.; "2016 Team Ranking". Rivals.

== Roster ==
2015–16 Western Michigan Broncos men's basketball team
Players
Coaches

Pos.	#	Name	Height	Weight	Year	Previous school	Hometown
G	0	Bryce Moore	6 ft 2 in (1.88 m)	190 lb (86 kg)	Fr	Park Tudor	Indianapolis, IN
G/F	1	Tucker Haymond	6 ft 6 in (1.98 m)	220 lb (100 kg)	Jr	Garfield	Seattle, WA
F	2	Connar Tava	6 ft 6 in (1.98 m)	245 lb (111 kg)	Sr	Warren De La Salle	Macomb, MI
G/F	3	Josh Davis	6 ft 5 in (1.96 m)	175 lb (79 kg)	Fr	Henry J. Ford	Detroit, MI
G	4	Jared Klein	6 ft 2 in (1.88 m)	175 lb (79 kg)	Sr	Otsego	Otsego, MI
G	10	Thomas Wilder	6 ft 3 in (1.91 m)	185 lb (84 kg)	So	Quakerdale Prep	Montgomery, IL
G	11	Ryan Wade (W)	5 ft 9 in (1.75 m)	170 lb (77 kg)	Fr	Laingsburg	Laingsburg, MI
C	15	Khadim Dieng	6 ft 11 in (2.11 m)	200 lb (91 kg)	So	NorthPointe Christian	Senegal
G/F	22	Joeviair Kennedy	6 ft 4 in (1.93 m)	195 lb (88 kg)	Fr	Muskegon	Muskegon, MI
G	32	Taylor Perry	6 ft 5 in (1.96 m)	200 lb (91 kg)	Sr	Rochester	Rochester, MI
F	34	Anthony Avery	6 ft 7 in (2.01 m)	205 lb (93 kg)	Sr	St. Rita of Cascia	Chicago, IL
F	40	Kellen McCormick	6 ft 8 in (2.03 m)	215 lb (98 kg)	RS Jr	Notre Dame Prep	West Bloomfield, MI
C	42	Drake LaMont	6 ft 10 in (2.08 m)	240 lb (109 kg)	So	American Heritage	Plantation, FL
C	50	Seth Dugan	7 ft 0 in (2.13 m)	240 lb (109 kg)	Fr	Otsego	Otsego, MI

Head coach

- Steve Hawkins (South Alabama)

Assistant coach(es)

- Clayton Bates (Florida)
- Larry Farmer (UCLA)
- Jason Larson (USC Upstate)

Legend

- (C) Team captain
- (S) Suspended
- (I) Ineligible
- (W) Walk-on
- Injured
- Current redshirt

Roster

== Schedule ==
Date time, TV	Rank^{#}	Opponent^{#}	Result	Record	Site (attendance) city, state
Exhibition
November 7, 2015*; 2:00 pm		Kalamazoo	W 107–50		University Arena (2,135); Kalamazoo, MI
Non-conference regular season
November 14, 2015*; 9:00 pm, FSN		at DePaul	L 63–69	0–1	McGrath–Phillips Arena (4,001); Chicago, IL
November 17, 2015*; 7:00 pm, ESPN3		San Diego	W 74–62	1–1	University Arena (2,087); Kalamazoo, MI
November 21, 2015*; 7:00 pm, CAA.tv		at UNC Wilmington	L 76–80	1–2	Trask Coliseum (4,019); Wilmington, NC
November 23, 2015*; 7:00 pm, ESPN3		Rochester College	W 85–73	2–2	University Arena (1,821); Kalamazoo, MI
November 26, 2015*; 4:30 pm, ASN		vs. Stephen F. Austin; Music City Challenge	L 71–79	2–3	Nashville Municipal Auditorium; Nashville, TN
November 27, 2015*; 3:30 pm		vs. Liberty; Music City Challenge	W 68–58	3–3	Nashville Municipal Auditorium; Nashville, TN
November 29, 2015*; 5:00 pm, ASN		vs. Mercer; Music City Challenge	L 65–68	3–4	Nashville Municipal Auditorium; Nashville, TN
December 3, 2015*; 7:00 pm		at James Madison	L 57–63	3–5	James Madison University Convocation Center (2,660); Harrisonburg, VA
December 7, 2015*; 7:00 pm, ESPN3		Northeastern	W 87–86 ^{OT}	4–5	University Arena (2,031); Kalamazoo, MI
December 12, 2015*; 4:30 pm, ESPN3		Marygrove	W 101–59	5–5	University Arena (2,316); Kalamazoo, MI
December 22, 2015*; 7:00 pm, ESPN3		IPFW	L 86–89 ^{OT}	5–6	University Arena (2,676); Kalamazoo, MI
December 30, 2015*; 9:00 pm, SECN		at Vanderbilt	L 61–86	5–7	Memorial Gymnasium (10,092); Nashville, TN
January 2, 2016*; 2:00 pm		Jacksonville	W 76–72	6–7	University Arena (2,343); Kalamazoo, MI
MAC regular season
January 5, 2016; 7:00 pm		Kent State	L 84–87	6–8 (0–1)	University Arena (2,016); Kalamazoo, MI
January 8, 2016; 7:00 pm		at Akron	L 53–62	6–9 (0–2)	James A. Rhodes Arena (2,642); Akron, OH
January 12, 2016; 7:00 pm		Ball State	L 64–74	6–10 (0–3)	University Arena (1,901); Kalamazoo, MI
January 16, 2016; 7:00 pm, ESPN3		Northern Illinois	W 83–69	7–10 (1–3)	University Arena (2,649); Kalamazoo, MI
January 19, 2016; 7:00 pm, ASN		at Ohio	L 64–82	7–11 (1–4)	Convocation Center (6,346); Athens, OH
January 23, 2016; 4:30 pm, ESPN3		Buffalo	W 91–71	8–11 (2–4)	University Arena (3,079); Kalamazoo, MI
January 26, 2016; 7:00 pm, ESPN3		Bowling Green	L 78–79	8–12 (2–5)	University Arena (2,245); Kalamazoo, MI
January 30, 2016; 2:00 pm, ESPN3		Eastern Michigan; Michigan MAC Trophy	W 94–86	9–12 (3–5)	University Arena (3,115); Kalamazoo, MI
February 2, 2016; 7:00 pm		at Toledo	L 62–89	9–13 (3–6)	Savage Arena (3,854); Toledo, OH
February 6, 2016; 2:00 pm		at Ball State	L 71–75 ^{OT}	9–14 (3–7)	John E. Worthen Arena (3,346); Muncie, IN
February 9, 2016; 7:00 pm, l		Miami	L 44–45	9–15 (3–8)	University Arena (2,014); Kalamazoo, MI
February 13, 2016; 2:00 pm, ESPN3		at Bowling Green	W 74–68	10–15 (4–8)	Stroh Center (2,979); Bowling Green, OH
February 16, 2016; 7:00 pm		at Kent State	L 78–85 ^{OT}	10–16 (4–9)	MAC Center (3,035); Kent, OH
February 20, 2016; 2:00 pm		Central Michigan; Michigan MAC Trophy	W 92–85	11–16 (5–9)	University Arena (3,869); Kalamazoo, MI
February 23, 2016		at Eastern Michigan; Michigan MAC Trophy	L 62–73	11–17 (5–10)	Convocation Center (928); Ypsilanti, MI
February 27, 2016		at Northern Illinois	L 67–76	11–18 (5–11)	Convocation Center (3,019); DeKalb, IL
March 1, 2016; 7:00 pm		Toledo	W 70–64	12–18 (6–11)	University Arena (2,382); Kalamazoo, MI
March 4, 2016; 7:00 pm		at Central Michigan; Michigan MAC Trophy	W 91–82	13–18 (7–11)	McGuirk Arena (3,292); Mount Pleasant, MI
MAC tournament
March 7, 2016; 8:00 pm, ESPN3	(10)	at (7) Northern Illinois; First round	L 50–56	13–19	Convocation Center (1,594); DeKalb, IL
*Non-conference game. ^{#}Rankings from AP Poll. (#) Tournament seedings in parentheses. All times are in Eastern Time.
