= 2015–16 Ball State Cardinals men's basketball team =

American college basketball season

2015–16 Ball State Cardinals men's basketball

MAC West Division co–champions

CIT, Quarterfinals
- Conference: Mid-American Conference
- West Division
- Record: 21–14 (10–8 MAC)
- Head coach: James Whitford (3rd season)
- Assistant coaches: Jason Grunkemeyer; Danny Peters; Brian Thornton
- Home arena: Worthen Arena

2015–16 Mid-American Conference men's basketball standings
	Conf.				Overall
Team	W		L	PCT	W		L	PCT
East
Akron	13	–	5	.722	26	–	9	.743
Ohio	11	–	7	.611	23	–	12	.657
Kent State	10	–	8	.556	19	–	13	.594
Buffalo †	10	–	8	.556	20	–	15	.571
Miami (OH)	6	–	12	.333	13	–	20	.394
Bowling Green	5	–	13	.278	16	–	18	.471
West
Ball State	10	–	8	.556	21	–	14	.600
Central Michigan	10	–	8	.556	17	–	16	.515
Northern Illinois	9	–	9	.500	21	–	13	.618
Eastern Michigan	9	–	9	.500	18	–	15	.545
Toledo	8	–	10	.444	17	–	15	.531
Western Michigan	7	–	11	.389	13	–	19	.406
† 2016 MAC tournament winner

Ball State Cardinals Wordmark

The 2015–16 Ball State Cardinals men's basketball team represented Ball State University during the 2015–16 NCAA Division I men's basketball season. The Cardinals, led by third year head coach James Whitford, played their home games at Worthen Arena as members of the West Division of the Mid-American Conference. They finished the season 21–14, 10–8 in MAC play to finish in a tie for the West Division championship. They lost to Miami (OH) in the first round of the MAC tournament. They were invited to the CollegeInsider.com Tournament where they defeated Tennessee State and UT Martin to advance to the quarterfinals where they lost to Columbia.

== Previous season ==
The Cardinals finished the previous season 7–23, 2–16 in MAC play to finish in last place in the West Division. They lost in the first round of the MAC tournament to Bowling Green.

== Departures ==
Name	Number	Pos.	Height	Weight	Year	Hometown	Notes
Zavier Turner	1	G	5'9"	170	Sophomore	Indianapolis, IN	Transferred to Manhattan
Matt Kamieniecki	2	F/C	6'8"	238	RS Senior	Clarkston, MI	Graduated
Tye Wilburn	3	G	5'11"	185	Freshman	Schererville, IN	Transferred to Kilgore College
Rashaun Richardson	32	F	6'8"	190	Freshman	Indianapolis, IN	Transferred to John A. Logan College
Mading Thok	44	C	6'11"	222	RS Sophomore	Boyden, IN	Transferred to Minnesota State

=== Incoming transfers ===
Name	Number	Pos.	Height	Weight	Year	Hometown	Previous School
Tayler Persons	2	G	6'3"	230	Sophomore	Kokomo, IN	Transferred from Northern Kentucky. Under NCAA transfer rules, Persons will have to sit out for the 2015–16 season. Will have three years of remaining eligibility.
Naiel Smith	3	G	6'4"	190	Junior	Brooklyn, NY	Junior college transferred from San Jacinto College
Nate Wells	52	C	7'1"	260	RS Senior	Davenport, IA	Transfer from Bradley. Will be eligible to play immediately since Wells graduated from Bradley.

== Recruiting class of 2015 ==
College recruiting information
Name	Hometown	School	Height	Weight	Commit date
Tahjai Teague #37 PF	Indianapolis, IN	Pike High School	6 ft 8 in (2.03 m)	175 lb (79 kg)	Oct 14, 2014
Tahjai Teague #37 PF	Recruit ratings: Scout: Rivals: (80)				
Trey Moses; PF	Louisville, KY	Eastern High School	6 ft 9 in (2.06 m)	220 lb (100 kg)	Sep 23, 2014
Trey Moses; PF	Recruit ratings: Scout: Rivals: (NR)				
Overall recruit ranking:
Note: In many cases, Scout, Rivals, 247Sports, On3, and ESPN may conflict in their listings of height and weight.; In these cases, the average was taken. ESPN grades are on a 100-point scale.; Sources: "2015 Team Ranking". Rivals.

== Roster ==
2015–16 Ball State Cardinals men's basketball team
Players
Coaches

Pos.	#	Name	Height	Weight	Year	Previous school	Hometown
G	0	Francis Kiapway	6 ft 3 in (1.91 m)	190 lb (86 kg)	Fr	St. Thomas More (CT)	Hamilton, Ontario
G	1	Naiel Smith	6 ft 4 in (1.93 m)	200 lb (91 kg)	Jr	Queen City Prep (NC); San Jacinto College	Brooklyn, NY
G	2	Tayler Persons (I) (redshirt)	6 ft 3 in (1.91 m)	213 lb (97 kg)	So	Kokomo; Northern Kentucky	Kokomo, Indiana
F	5	Rocco Belcaster	6 ft 7 in (2.01 m)	221 lb (100 kg)	RS Jr	Morton HS	Berwyn, IL
G	11	Kaleb Mallory (W)	5 ft 8 in (1.73 m)	160 lb (73 kg)	Jr	Muncie Central HS	Muncie, IN
F	12	Bo Calhoun	6 ft 6 in (1.98 m)	245 lb (111 kg)	Sr	Washington HS	South Bend, IN
F	15	Franko House	6 ft 6 in (1.98 m)	247 lb (112 kg)	Jr	Concord HS	Elkhart, IN
F	21	Gill Bik	6 ft 7 in (2.01 m)	227 lb (103 kg)	Sr	Ascension of Our Lord Secondary School; Owens CC	Toronto, ON
F	22	Jermaine Tyler	6 ft 2 in (1.88 m)	172 lb (78 kg)	So	Arsenal Tech	Indianapolis, IN
F	24	Jeremiah Davis	6 ft 4 in (1.93 m)	210 lb (95 kg)	RS Sr	Huntington Prep; Cincinnati	Muncie, IN
F	25	Tahjai Teague	6 ft 8 in (2.03 m)	195 lb (88 kg)	Fr	Pike	Indianapolis, IN
G/F	33	Ryan Weber	6 ft 6 in (1.98 m)	226 lb (103 kg)	RS Jr	Roncalli HS; Youngstown State	Indianapolis, IN
F	34	Sean Sellers	6 ft 6 in (1.98 m)	208 lb (94 kg)	So	Greensburg HS	Greensburg, IN
F/C	41	Trey Moses	6 ft 9 in (2.06 m)	245 lb (111 kg)	Fr	Eastern	Louisville, KY
C	52	Nate Wells	7 ft 1 in (2.16 m)	247 lb (112 kg)	RS Sr	West; Bradley	Davenport, IA

Head coach

- James Whitford (Wisconsin)

Assistant coach(es)

- Jason Grunkemeyer (Miami (OH))
- Danny Peters (Ohio State)
- Brian Thornton (Xavier)

Legend

- (C) Team captain
- (S) Suspended
- (I) Ineligible
- (W) Walk-on
- Injured
- Current redshirt

Roster

== Schedule ==
Date time, TV	Opponent	Result	Record	Site (attendance) city, state
Non-conference regular season
11/13/2015*; 8:00 pm, ESPN3	at Bradley	L 53–54	0–1	Carver Arena (6,553); Peoria, IL
11/16/2015*; 7:00 pm, ESPN3	Eastern Illinois	W 73–56	1–1	Worthen Arena (2,864); Muncie, IN
11/20/2015*; 6:00 pm	at Eastern Kentucky; EKUHoops Classic	L 81–89	1–2	Alumni Coliseum (2,150); Richmond, KY
11/21/2015*; 4:30 pm	vs. Longwood; EKUHoops Classic	W 78–67	2–2	Alumni Coliseum (500); Richmond, KY
11/22/2015*; 4:30 pm	vs. South Carolina State; EKUHoops Classic	W 72–60	3–2	Alumni Coliseum (500); Richmond, KY
11/25/2015*; 7:00 pm, ESPN3	IU Kokomo	W 90–54	4–2	Worthen Arena (2,129); Muncie, IN
11/28/2015*; 2:00 pm, ESPN3	Valparaiso	W 69–66	5–2	Worthen Arena (2,447); Muncie, IN
12/01/2015*; 7:00 pm, ESPN3	IUPUI	W 61–58	6–2	Worthen Arena (2,397); Muncie, IN
12/05/2015*; 2:00 pm, ESPN3	New Orleans	W 66–52	7–2	Worthen Arena (2,528); Muncie, IN
12/12/2015*; 1:00 pm, ESPN3	Pepperdine	L 63–72	7–3	Worthen Arena (2,816); Muncie, IN
12/22/2015*; 7:00 pm, ESPN3	at Indiana State	L 61–73	7–4	Hulman Center (3,256); Terre Haute, IN
12/29/2015*; 7:00 pm, ESPN3	Alabama A&M	W 63–62	8–4	Worthen Arena (2,356); Muncie, IN
12/31/2015*; 2:00 pm, ESPN3	Chicago State	W 73–48	9–4	Worthen Arena (2,251); Muncie, IN
MAC regular season
01/06/2016; 7:00 pm, ESPN3	Toledo	W 87–69	10–4 (1–0)	Worthen Arena (2,152); Muncie, IN
01/09/2016; 2:00 pm	at Ohio	L 73–79	10–5 (1–1)	Convocation Center (6,703); Athens, OH
01/12/2016; 7:00 pm, ESPN3	at Western Michigan	W 74–64	11–5 (2–1)	University Arena (1,901); Kalamazoo, MI
01/16/2016; 2:00 pm, ESPN3	Miami (OH)	W 48–46	12–5 (3–1)	Worthen Arena (3,218); Muncie, IN
01/19/2016; 7:00 pm, ESPN3	Kent State	L 68–76	12–6 (3–2)	Worthen Arena (3,190); Muncie, IN
01/23/2016; 11:30 am, ESPN3	at Eastern Michigan	W 88-87 ^{2OT}	13-6 (4-2)	Convocation Center; Ypsilanti, MI
01/26/2016; 7:00 pm, ESPN3	at Buffalo	L 64–76	13–7 (4–3)	Alumni Arena (3,522); Amherst, NY
01/30/2016; 1:00 pm, ESPN3	Akron	L 64–73	13–8 (4–4)	Worthen Arena (3,021); Muncie, IN
02/02/2016; 7:00 pm, ESPN3	at Bowling Green	W 72–64	14–8 (5–4)	Stroh Center (2,593); Bowling Green, OH
02/06/2016; 2:00 pm, ESPN3	Western Michigan	W 75–71 ^{OT}	15–8 (6–4)	Worthen Arena (3,346); Muncie, IN
02/09/2016; 7:00 pm, ESPN3	Ohio	L 69–72	15–9 (6–5)	Worthen Arena (3,100); Muncie, IN
02/13/2016; 4:30 pm, ESPN3	at Central Michigan	W 75–63	16–9 (7–5)	McGuirk Arena (3,351); Mount Pleasant, MI
02/16/2016; 7:00 pm, ESPN3	at Miami (OH)	W 73–56	17–9 (8–5)	Millett Hall (1,706); Oxford, OH
02/19/2016; 6:30 pm, CBSSN	Northern Illinois	W 63–59	18–9 (9–5)	Worthen Arena (5,160); Muncie, IN
02/23/2016; 8:00 pm, ESPN3	at Toledo	L 67–77	18–10 (9–6)	Savage Arena (4,112); Toledo, OH
02/27/2016; 2:00 pm, ESPN3	Eastern Michigan	W 115–79	19–10 (10–6)	Worthen Arena (3,353); Muncie, IN
03/01/2016; 7:00 pm, ESPN3	Central Michigan	L 57–65	19–11 (10–7)	Worthen Arena (2,738); Muncie, IN
03/04/2016; 7:00 pm, CBSSN	at Northern Illinois	L 69–80	19–12 (10–8)	Convocation Center (2,102); DeKalb, IL
MAC tournament
03/07/2016; 7:00 pm, ESPN3	Miami (OH); First round	L 47–49	19–13	Worthen Arena (2,245); Muncie, IN
CIT
03/15/2016*; 8:00 pm	at Tennessee State; First round	W 78–73 ^{2OT}	20–13	Gentry Complex (1,013); Nashville, TN
03/20/2016*; 6:00 pm	UT Martin; Second round	W 83–80 ^{OT}	21–13	Worthen Arena (1,203); Muncie, IN
03/23/2016*; 7:00 pm	at Columbia; Quarterfinals	L 67–69	21–14	Levien Gymnasium (1,397); New York City, NY
*Non-conference game. ^{#}Rankings from AP Poll. (#) Tournament seedings in parentheses. All times are in Eastern.
