= Shayne Whittington =

American basketball player (born 1991)

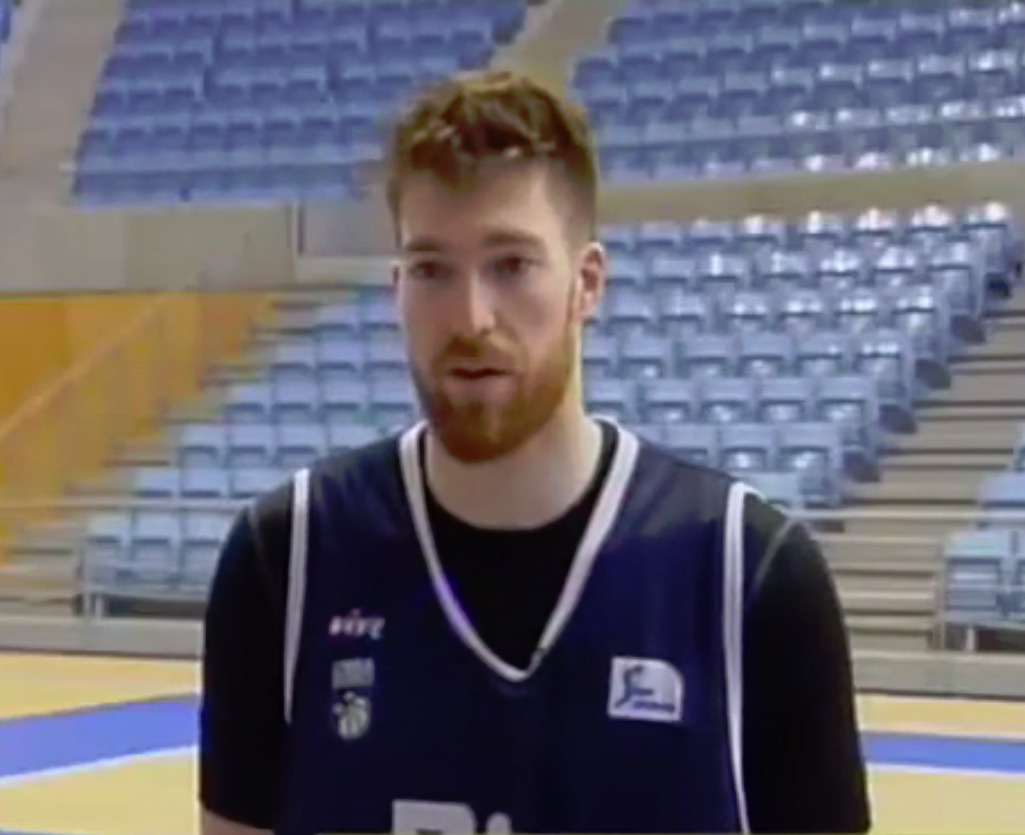
- Whittington

Personal information
- Born: March 27, 1991 (age 35) Lawrence, Michigan, U.S.
- Listed height: 6 ft 11 in (2.11 m)
- Listed weight: 245 lb (111 kg)

Career information
- High school: Lawrence (Lawrence, Michigan)
- College: Western Michigan (2009–2014)
- NBA draft: 2014: undrafted
- Playing career: 2014–2022
- Position: Power forward / center
- Number: 42, 21
- Coaching career: 2023–present

Career history

Playing
- 2014–2016: Indiana Pacers
- 2014–2016: →Fort Wayne Mad Ants
- 2016–2017: Obradoiro
- 2017–2018: Zenit Saint Petersburg
- 2018: Andorra
- 2018–2019: Estudiantes
- 2019–2020: Real Betis
- 2020–2021: SeaHorses Mikawa
- 2021–2022: Nagoya Diamond Dolphins

Coaching
- 2023–2024: Indiana Pacers (assistant)
- 2024–2025: Western Michigan (assistant)

Career highlights
- First-team All-MAC (2014); Second-team All-MAC (2013)
- Stats at NBA.com
- Stats at Basketball Reference

Shayne Mitchell Whittington (born March 27, 1991) is an American-Macedonian former professional basketball player who currently serves as an assistant coach for the Western Michigan Broncos. He also represents North Macedonia in the international competitions. He played college basketball for Western Michigan University.

== High school career ==
Whittington attended Lawrence High School in Lawrence, Michigan. As a junior, he averaged 11.3 points, 9.2 rebounds and 2.1 blocks per game, leading Lawrence to a 23–2 record and earning Detroit Free Press Class D Honorable Mention All-State honors.

As a senior, he averaged 17.2 points, 12.1 rebounds, 4.0 blocks, 3.0 steals and 2.0 assists per game as the Tigers went 24–2, a school record for wins. He was named Class D First Team All-State by Bankhoops.com, BCAM, Detroit News, Detroit Free Press and Associated Press.

== College career ==
In his freshman season at Western Michigan, Whittington played sparingly for the Broncos. In 16 games, he averaged 1.4 points and 1.6 rebounds in 5.9 minutes per game.

In November 2010, Whittington elected to redshirt the 2010–11 season after finding himself behind freshman Matt Stainbrook and junior Caleb Dean in the team's rotation.

On November 12, 2011, Whittington played his first game since the 2009–10 season at South Dakota State, recording three points and two rebounds in 10 minutes of action. In his redshirted sophomore season, he played 32 games (7 starts), averaging 4.2 points and 4.0 rebounds in 14.1 minutes per game.

In his junior season, he was named to the 2013 All-MAC second team and led the conference with 12 double-doubles. In 35 games (all starts), he averaged 13.2 points, 8.8 rebounds, 1.1 assists and 1.7 blocks in 29.7 minutes per game.

In his senior season, he was named to the 2014 All-MAC first team after being named the MAC West Player of the Week four times. In 31 games (all starts), he averaged 16.1 points, 8.9 rebounds, 1.1 assists and 1.5 blocks in 31.8 minutes per game.

== Professional career ==
=== Indiana Pacers (2014–2016) ===
Whittington went undrafted in the 2014 NBA draft. On July 2, 2014, he signed with the Indiana Pacers. On November 8, he made his NBA debut in a 97–90 loss to the Washington Wizards, recording two points, three rebounds and two assists in eight minutes off the bench. On January 28, 2015, he was assigned to the Fort Wayne Mad Ants of the NBA Development League. He was recalled by the Pacers two days later. On April 8, he was reassigned to the Mad Ants to help the team in their playoff run. He returned to the Pacers in late April following the Mad Ants' 2–0 D-League Finals series loss to the Santa Cruz Warriors.

On July 27, 2015, Whittington re-signed with the Pacers. During the 2015–16 season, he received multiple assignments to the Fort Wayne Mad Ants. That offseason, he was waived by the Pacers.

=== Obradoiro CAB (2016–2017) ===
Whittington signed with Río Natura Monbus Obradoiro of Spain's Liga ACB on August 7, 2016.

=== Zenit Saint Petersburg (2017–2018) ===
On July 21, 2017, Whittington signed with Russian club Zenit Saint Petersburg for the 2017–18 season.

=== MoraBanc Andorra (2018) ===
On July 26, 2018, Whittington signed a two-year deal with MoraBanc Andorra of the Liga ACB.

=== Movistar Estudiantes (2018–2019) ===
On December 27, 2018, Whittington signed with Movistar Estudiantes of the Liga ACB.

=== Coosur Real Betis (2019–2020) ===
On August 1, 2019, Whittington signed a two-year deal with Coosur Real Betis of the Liga ACB. He averaged 8 points and 4 rebounds per game. On June 9, 2020, Whittington parted ways with the team.

== Coaching career ==
=== Indiana Pacers ===
On June 2, 2023, Whittington became an assistant coach for the Indiana Pacers.

=== Western Michigan ===
On June 19, 2024, Whittington was hired by his alma mater Western Michigan as an assistant coach.

== NBA career statistics ==
Legend
GP	Games played	GS	Games started	MPG	Minutes per game
FG%	Field goal percentage	3P%	3-point field goal percentage	FT%	Free throw percentage
RPG	Rebounds per game	APG	Assists per game	SPG	Steals per game
BPG	Blocks per game	PPG	Points per game	**Bold**	Career high

=== Regular season ===
Year	Team	GP	GS	MPG	FG%	3P%	FT%	RPG	APG	SPG	BPG	PPG
2014–15	Indiana	**20**	0	5.4	.452	**.167**	**.783**	1.5	.3	**.3**	**.1**	**2.9**
2015–16	Indiana	7	0	**5.9**	**.455**	.000	.500	**1.7**	**.4**	.1	**.1**	1.6
Career		27	0	5.5	.453	.125	.760	1.5	.3	.2	.1	2.5

== Personal life ==
Whittington is the son of Scott Whittington and Carrie Rokos, and has one older brother, Spencer, a younger sister, Erika, and two younger brothers, Cody and Joey.
