= Ben Handlogten =

American basketball player (born 1973)

Personal information
- Born: November 16, 1973 (age 52) Grand Rapids, Michigan, U.S.
- Listed height: 6 ft 10 in (2.08 m)
- Listed weight: 247 lb (112 kg)

Career information
- High school: South Christian (Grand Rapids, Michigan)
- College: Western Michigan (1992–1996)
- NBA draft: 1996: undrafted
- Playing career: 1996–2006
- Position: Center
- Number: 44
- Coaching career: 2008–2011

Career history

Playing
- 1996–1997: Grand Rapids Hoops
- 1997–1998: Oyak Renault
- 1998–1999: Daiwa
- 1999–2000: Galatasaray
- 2000–2001: Ülkerspor
- 2001–2002: Virtus Roma
- 2002–2003: Makedonikos
- 2003–2005: Utah Jazz
- 2005–2006: Ulsan Mobis Phoebus

Coaching
- 2008–2010: SouthLake Christian Academy (assistant)
- 2010–2011: SouthLake Christian Academy

Career highlights
- Greek League All-Star (2003); Turkish Super League champion (2001); First-team All-MAC (1996)
- Stats at NBA.com
- Stats at Basketball Reference

Benjamin Louis Handlogten (born November 16, 1973) is an American former professional basketball player who played in the National Basketball Association (NBA) and other leagues.

== Early life and education ==
Handlogten, who was born in Grand Rapids, Michigan, graduated from South Christian High School of Grand Rapids and attended Western Michigan University in Kalamazoo, Michigan.

== Professional career ==
Handlogten grew up as a Detroit Pistons fan during the "Bad Boys" era of the team. Not selected in the 1996 NBA draft, Handlogten signed with the Pistons as a free agent on September 18, 1996, but was cut before the regular season. He entered professional basketball in 1996 with the Grand Rapids Hoops of the Continental Basketball Association. For the 1997–98 season, Handlogten played for Oyak Renault of the Turkish Basketball League (TBL) and averaged 17.6 points, 10.4 rebounds, and 1.4 blocks. In 1998, Handlogten signed with Daiwa of the Japanese bj league and had an average 16.6 points, 11.8 rebounds, and 1.5 blocks.

After his one season with Daiwa, Handlogten played two more seasons in the TBL: with Galatasaray in 1999–2000 and Ülkerspor in 2000–01. Handlogten averaged 17.4 points and 8.4 rebounds in the 2001–02 season with Virtus Roma of the Italian Lega Basket Serie A. In the 2002–03 season, Handlogten played for Makedonikos B.C. of the Greek Basket League and was the league's top rebounder that season with 12.8 per game. With Makedonikos, Handlogten scored an average of 16.8 points per game and also had 1.4 assists and 1.1 blocks per game.

He signed as an undrafted free agent with the Utah Jazz of the National Basketball Association (NBA) on September 30, 2003. Handlogten played 17 games and averaged 4.0 points, 3.2 rebounds, and 0.4 assists before a season-ending ACL injury on December 26, 2003. Handlogten scored a career-high 13 points on December 12 and grabbed a season-high 9 rebounds two days later, December 14.

On February 19, 2004, the Jazz traded Handlogten and Keon Clark to the Phoenix Suns for Tom Gugliotta and future draft picks; the Suns waived Handlogten the following day. Following two ten-day contracts, Handlogten signed a contract for the rest of the season with the Utah Jazz on March 29, 2005. He averaged 4.5 points, 3.1 rebounds, and 0.6 assists in 21 games (5 starts). On April 1, Handlogten scored a season-high 12 points and grabbed a season- and career-high 11 rebounds.

The New Jersey Nets waived Handlogten on November 8, 2005, after Handlogten signed on October 4. Handlogten then signed with Ulsan Mobis Phoebus of the Korean Basketball League the following week. On February 19, 2006, he agreed to join Winterthur FC Barcelona of Liga ACB for the rest of the season. However, the team delayed the signing pending medical examinations. In March 2006, he was cut by the team.

== Post-playing career ==
After his basketball career, Handlogten became owner of a real estate/construction company in Charlotte, North Carolina. Joining the school as an assistant coach in 2008, Handlogten became head boys' basketball coach at SouthLake Christian Academy of Huntersville, North Carolina. In 2011, Handlogten became an executive at a medical supply company.

== Personal life ==
His son, Micah, plays for the Florida Gators men's basketball team.
