= Western Michigan Broncos men's basketball =

Basketball team in Kalamazoo, Michigan

Western Michigan Broncos
2026–27 Western Michigan Broncos men's basketball team
- University: Western Michigan University
- Head coach: Kahil Fennell (1st season)
- Location: Kalamazoo, Michigan
- Arena: University Arena (capacity: 5,421)
- Conference: Mid-American
- Nickname: Broncos
- Colors: Brown and gold

NCAA Division I tournament Sweet Sixteen
- 1976

NCAA Division I tournament appearances
- 1976 • 1998 • 2004 • 2014

Conference tournament champions
- 2004 • 2014

Conference regular-season champions
- 1952 • 1976 • 1981 • 1998 • 2004 • 2014

Conference division champions
- 1998 • 2004 • 2005 • 2008 • 2009 • 2011 • 2013 • 2014 • 2017

The Western Michigan Broncos men's basketball team represents Western Michigan University in Kalamazoo, Michigan. The school's team competes in the Mid-American Conference (MAC) and are coached by Kahil Fennell. The team last played in the NCAA Division I men's basketball tournament in 2014.

== Postseason ==
=== NCAA tournament results ===
The Broncos have appeared in four NCAA Tournaments. Their combined record is 2–4.

Year	Seed	Round	Opponent	Result
1976		Quarterfinals; Regional semifinals	Virginia Tech; Marquette	W 77–67; L 62–57
1998	#11	First round Second Round	Clemson; Stanford	W 75–72; L 83–65
2004	#11	First round	Vanderbilt	L 71–58
2014	#14	First round	Syracuse	L 77–53

=== NIT results ===
The Broncos have appeared in three National Invitational Tournaments (NIT). Their combined record is 2–3.

Year	Round	Opponent	Result
1992	First round	Notre Dame	L 63–56
2003	First round Second Round	Illinois–Chicago; Siena	W 63–62; L 68–62
2005	First round Second Round	Marquette; Texas Christian	W 54–50; L 78–76

=== CBI results ===
The Broncos have appeared in one College Basketball Invitational (CBI). Their record is 2–1.

Year	Round	Opponent	Result
2013	First round Quarterfinals; Semifinals	North Dakota State; Wyoming; George Mason	W 72–71 ^{OT} W 75–67 ^{OT} L 62–52

=== CIT results ===
The Broncos have appeared in the CollegeInsider.com Postseason Tournament (CIT) two times. Their combined record is 1–2.

Year	Round	Opponent	Result
2011	First round Second Round	Tennessee Tech; Buffalo	W 74–66; L 49–48
2015	First round	Cleveland State	L 86–57

== Broncos in the NBA ==
- Don Boven, 1950–1953
- Dillard Crocker, 1949–1953
- Paul Griffin, 1977–1983
- Ben Handlogten, 2004–2005
- Reggie Lacefield, 1969
- Walker Russell, 1983–1988
- Shayne Whittington, 2014–2016

== All-time win–loss record ==
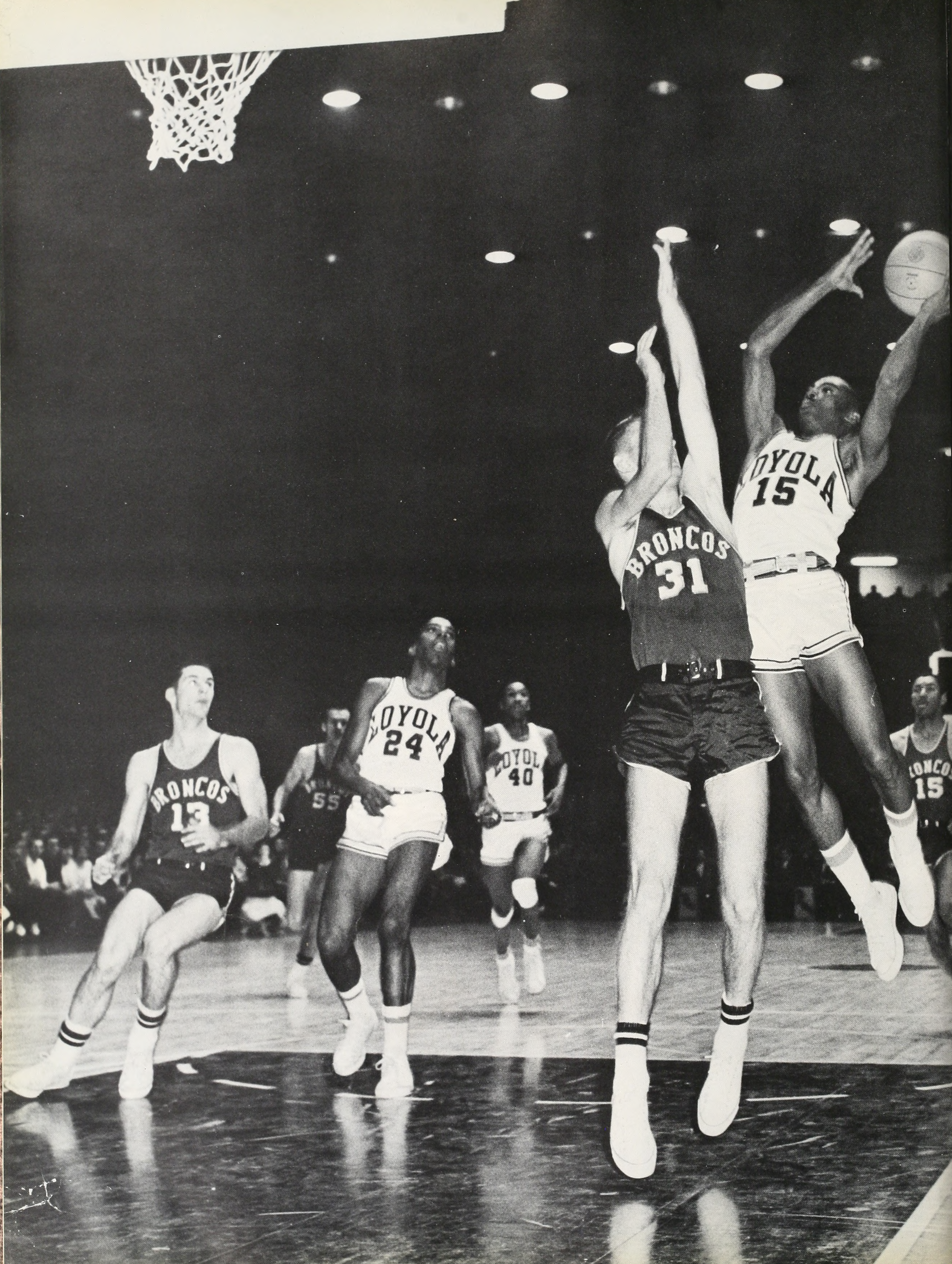
Loyola-Chicago at Western Michigan, January 10, 1963

Record table
Season	Coach	Overall	Conference	Standing	Postseason
Bill Spaulding (1913–1922)
1913–14	Spaulding	4–4			
1914–15	Spaulding	7–5			
1915–16	Spaulding	9–7			
1916–17	Spaulding	7–6			
1917–18	Spaulding	8–4			
1918–19	Spaulding	11–3			
1919–20	Spaulding	8–3			
1920–21	Spaulding	12–5			
1921–22	Spaulding	11–6			
Bill Spaulding:		77–43			
Buck Read (1922–1949)
1922–23	Read	17–6			
1923–24	Read	13–8			
1924–25	Read	17–4			
1925–26	Read	15–4			
1926–27	Read	16–2			
1927–28	Read	9–8			
1928–29	Read	10–9			
1929–30	Read	17–0			
1930–31	Read	14–3			
1931–32	Read	14–5			
1932–33	Read	14–3			
1933–34	Read	12–5			
1934–35	Read	11–5			
1935–36	Read	15–3			
1936–37	Read	13–4			
1937–38	Read	6–12			
1938–39	Read	7–10			
1939–40	Read	10–9			
1940–41	Read	9–9			
1941–42	Read	12–8			
1942–43	Read	15–4			
1943–44	Read	15–4			
1944–45	Read	8–10			
1945–46	Read	15–7			
1946–47	Read	17–7			
1947–48	Read	12–10	1–2	5th	
1948–49	Read	12–10	4–6	T-3rd	
Buck Read:		345–169	5–8		
Bill Perigo (1949–1952)
1949–50	Perigo	12–10	6–2	T-2nd	
1950–51	Perigo	13–9	4–4	T-2nd	
1951–52	Perigo	16–8	9–3	T-1st	
Bill Perigo:		41–27	19–9		
Joe Hoy (1952–1958)
1952–53	Hoy	12–9	6–6	4th	
1953–54	Hoy	10–11	4–5	5th	
1954–55	Hoy	12–10	9–5	3rd	
1955–56	Hoy	13–9	7–5	T-3rd	
1956–57	Hoy	9–13	4–8	5th	
1957–58	Hoy	5–18	1–11	7th	
Joe Hoy:		61–70	31–40		
Don Boven (1958–1966)
1958–59	Boven	2–20	1–11	7th	
1959–60	Boven	12–11	5–7	5th	
1960–61	Boven	10–14	4–8	T-5th	
1961–62	Boven	13–11	6–6	T-4th	
1962–63	Boven	12–12	7–5	5th	
1963–64	Boven	10–14	6–6	4th	
1964–65	Boven	8–16	3–9	6th	
1965–66	Boven	8–14	4–8	5th	
Don Boven:		75–112	36–60		
Sonny Means (1966–1970)
1966–67	Means	10–14	4–8	5th	
1967–68	Means	11–13	5–7	4th	
1968–69	Means	11–13	6–6	T-3rd	
1969–70	Means	6–17	2–8	T-5th	
Sonny Means:		38–57	17–29		
Eldon Miller (1970–1976)
1970–71	Miller	14–10	5–5	3rd	
1971–72	Miller	10–14	5–5	4th	
1972–73	Miller	8–18	2–10	7th	
1973–74	Miller	13–13	5–7	6th	
1974–75	Miller	16–10	8–6	5th	
1975–76	Miller	25–3	15–1	1st	NCAA Sweet Sixteen
Eldon Miller:		86–68	40–34		
Dick Shilts (1976–1979)
1976–77	Shilts	14–13	8–8	5th	
1977–78	Shilts	7–20	4–12	T-9th	
1978–79	Shilts	7–23	3–13	10th	
Dick Shilts:		28–56	15–33		
Les Wothke (1979–1982)
1979–80	Wothke	12–14	7–9	T-4th	
1980–81	Wothke	15–13	10–6	T-1st	
1981–82	Wothke	15–14	8–8	T-4th	
Les Wothke:		42–41	25–23		
Vernon Payne (1982–1989)
1982–83	Payne	5–23	3–15	10th	
1983–84	Payne	4–22	2–16	10th	
1984–85	Payne	12–16	7–11	T-7th	
1985–86	Payne	12–16	7–11	T-6th	
1986–87	Payne	12–16	7–9	T-5th	
1987–88	Payne	12–17	7–9	T-5th	
1988–89	Payne	12–16	6–10	T-6th	
Vernon Payne:		69–126	39–81		
Bob Donewald (1989–2000)
1989–90	Donewald	9–18	3–13	9th	
1990–91	Donewald	5–22	2–14	9th	
1991–92	Donewald	21–9	11–5	T-2nd	NIT first round
1992–93	Donewald	17–12	12–6	3rd	
1993–94	Donewald	14–14	7–11	8th	
1994–95	Donewald	14–13	9–9	7th	
1995–96	Donewald	16–11	13–5	2nd	
1996–97	Donewald	14–14	9–9	T-5th	
1997–98	Donewald	21–8	14–4	T-1st (West)	NCAA round of 32
1998–99	Donewald	11–15	6–12	4th (West)	
1999–00	Donewald	10–18	6–12	5th (West)	
Bob Donewald:		152–154	92–100		
Robert McCullum (2000–2003)
2000–01	McCullum	7–21	7–11	4th (West)	
2001–02	McCullum	17–13	10–8	3rd (West)	
2002–03	McCullum	20–11	10–8	3rd (West)	NIT first round
Robert McCullum:		44–45	27–27		
Steve Hawkins (2003–2020)
2003–04	Hawkins	26–5	15–3	1st (West)	NCAA round of 64
2004–05	Hawkins	20–13	11–7	T-1st (West)	NIT second round
2005–06	Hawkins	14–17	10–8	T-2nd (West)	
2006–07	Hawkins	16–16	9–7	2nd (West)	
2007–08	Hawkins	20–12	12–4	1st (West)	
2008–09	Hawkins	10–21	7–9	T-1st (West)	
2009–10	Hawkins	18–15	8–8	T-2nd (West)	
2010–11	Hawkins	21–13	11–5	1st (West)	CollegeInsider.com second round
2011–12	Hawkins	14–20	6–10	T-3rd (West)	
2012–13	Hawkins	22–13	10–6	1st (West)	CBI semifinals
2013–14	Hawkins	23–10	14–4	1st (West)	NCAA round of 64
2014–15	Hawkins	20–14	10–8	3rd (West)	CIT first round
2015–16	Hawkins	13–19	7–11	6th (West)	
2016–17	Hawkins	16–16	11–7	T-1st (West)	
2017–18	Hawkins	17–15	9–9	4th (West)	
2018–19	Hawkins	8–24	2–16	6th (West)	
2019–20	Hawkins	13–19	6–12	T-5th (West)	
Steve Hawkins:		291–262	158–134		
Clayton Bates (2020–2022)
2020–21	Bates	5–16	4–12	9th	
2021–22	Bates	8–23	4–16	12th	
Clayton Bates:		13–39	8–28		
Dwayne Stephens (2022–2026)
2022–23	Stephens	8–23	4–14	12th	
2023–24	Stephens	12-20	9-9	T-6th	
2024–25	Stephens	12-20	9-9	T-6th	
2025–26	Stephens	10-21	4–14	T-11th	
Dwayne Stephens:		42-84	26-46		
Kahil Fennell (2026–present)
2026–27	Fennell	4-1	0-0		
Kahil Fennell:		4-1	0-0		
Total:		1,408–1,345			
National champion Postseason invitational champion Conference regular season champion Conference regular season and conference tournament champion Division regular season champion Division regular season and conference tournament champion Conference tournament champion

== Records ==
Through 2019–20 season

=== Career leaders ===
==== Points ====
Rank	Points	Player	Career
1	2,122	David Kool	2006–10
2	2,040	Thomas Wilder	2014–18
3	1,787	Manny Newsome	1961–64
4	1,743	Booker James	1983–87
5	1,713	Joe Reitz	2004–08

==== Rebounds ====
Rank	Rebounds	Player	Career
1	1,008	Paul Griffin	1972–76
2	947	Tom Cutter	1973–77
3	939	Joe Reitz	2004–08
4	864	Booker James	1983–87
5	846	Anthony Kann	2000–04

==== Assists ====
Rank	Assists	Player	Career
1	477	Mike Douglas	2008–12
2	427	Billy Stanback	1986–90
3	418	Thomas Wilder	2014–18
4	406	Brian Snider	2002–06
5	391	Connor Roberts	1977–81

==== Field goal percentage (3 made per game) ====
Rank	Field goal pct	Player	Career
1	59.5% (459–771)	Tom Cutter	1973–77
2	59.3% (176–297)	Russ DesErmia	1995–97
3	56.7% (421–743)	Paul Griffin	1972–76
4	55.3% (283–512)	Matt Stainbrook	2010–12
5	54.8% (568–1036)	Joe Reitz	2004–08

==== Free throw percentage (2 made per game) ====
Rank	Free throw pct	Player	Career
1	90.5% (86–95)	Kylo Jones	1997–99
2	89.0% (605–680)	David Kool	2006–10
3	82.9% (247–298)	Billy Stanback	1986–90
3	82.6% (266–322)	Jason Black	1994–97
4	82.5% (329–399)	Manny Newsome	1961–64

==== Three point field goal percentage (1 made per game) ====
Rank	3-pt field goal pct	Player	Career
1	50.7% (139–274)	Sean Wightman	1990–93
2	47.6% (70–147)	Eli Parker	1987–89
3	46.6% (165–354)	Mark Brown	1987–90
4	41.3% (171–414)	Darrick Brooks	1989–93
5	40.9% (128–313)	Levi Rost	2003–05

==== Blocks ====
Rank	Blocks	Player	Career
1	149	Matt Van Abbema	1991–95
2	137	Mike Seberger	1978–82
3	130	Shayne Whittington	2009–14
4	116	Ben Handlogten	1992–96
5	104	Donald Lawson	2006–10

==== Steals ====
Rank	Steals	Player	Career
1	199	Robby Collum	2000–03
2	190	Thomas Wilder	2014–18
3	185	Booker James	1983–87
4	177	Anthony Kann	2000–04
5	173	Saddi Washington	1993–98

==== Games played ====
Rank	Games	Player	Career
1	135	David Brown	2009–15
1	135	Nate Hutcheson	2009–13
3	130	Drake LaMont	2014–18
3	130	Austin Richie	2011–15
3	130	Demetrius Ward	2008–12
3	130	Thomas Wilder	2014–18

=== Single-season leaders ===
==== Points ====
Rank	Points	Player	Season (games)
1	714	David Kool	2009–10 (33)
2	654	Manny Newsome	1963–64 (20)
3	631	David Brown	2013–14 (33)
4	630	Kenny Cunningham	1979–80 (26)
5	626	Saddi Washington	1997–98 (29)

==== Rebounds ====
Rank	Rebounds	Player	Season (games)
1	324	Edgar Blair	1957–58 (24)
2	316	Seth Dugan	2018–19 (32)
3	313	Bob Bolton	1960–61 (24)
4	308	Shayne Whittington	2012–13 (35)
5	300	Earl Jenkins	1970–71 (24)

==== Assists ====
Rank	Assists	Player	Season (games)
1	170	Rod Brown	1999–00 (28)
2	168	Mike Douglas	2010–11 (33)
3	166	Jason Kimbrough	1997–98 (29)
4	160	Rickey Willis	2004–05 (33)
5	159	Brian Snider	2005–06 (31)

==== Field goal percentage (3 made per game) ====
Rank	Field goal pct	Player	Season (games)
1	64.5% (140–217)	Tom Cutter	1975–76
2	60.5% (78–129)	Russ DesErmia	1995–96
3	59.92% (154–257)	Ben Handlogten	1995–96
4	59.90% (115–192)	Paul Griffin	1975–76
5	59.8% (134–224)	Tom Cutter	1974–75

==== Free throw percentage (2 made per game) ====
Rank	Field throw pct	Player	Season (games)
1	93.2% (55–59)	Thadus Williams	1998–99
2	91.7% (99–108)	David Kool	2006–07
3	89.7% (209–233)	David Kool	2009–10
4	89.4% (161–180)	David Kool	2008–09
5	89.2% (58–65)	Sean Wightman	1992–93

==== Three point field goal percentage (1 made per game) ====
Rank	3-pt field goal pct	Player	Season (games)
1	63.2% (48–76)	Sean Wightman	1991–92
2	49.3% (37–75)	William Boyer-Richard	2018–19
3	48.8% (63–129)	Sean Wightman	1992–93
4	48.2% (67–139)	Mark Brown	1989–90
5	47.3% (61–129)	Mark Brown	1987–88

==== Blocks ====
Rank	Blocks	Player	Season (games)
1	58	Shayne Whittington	2012–13 (35)
2	56	Matt Van Abbema	1993–94 (28)
3	48	LaMarcus Lowe	2008–09 (28)
4	47	Donald Lawson	2009–10 (33)
4	47	Matt Van Abbema	1992–93 (29)
4	47	Shayne Whittington	2013–14 (31)

==== Steals ====
Rank	Steals	Player	Season (games)
1	83	Robby Collum	2002–03 (31)
2	72	Robby Collum	2001–02 (30)
3	63	Brian Snider	2005–06 (31)
4	62	Thomas Wilder	2017–18 (32)
5	60	Mike Williams	2003–04 (31)

=== NCAA records ===
- Ben Handlogten, highest single game field goal percentage, 100% (13–13), January 22, 1996 vs. Toledo
- David Kool, fourth highest single-season free throw percentage by a freshman, 91.7% (99–108), 2006–07
- Sean Wightman, second highest single-season three-point field goal percentage, 63.2% (48–76), 1991–92
