= Reggie Lacefield =

American basketball player (1945–2023)

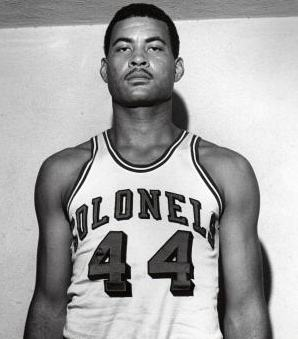

Personal information
- Born: April 10, 1945 Gary, Indiana, U.S.
- Died: December 17, 2023 (aged 78)
- Listed height: 6 ft 5 in (1.96 m)
- Listed weight: 230 lb (104 kg)

Career information
- High school: Roosevelt (Gary, Indiana)
- College: Western Michigan (1965–1968)
- NBA draft: 1968: 12th round, 155th overall pick
- Drafted by: Los Angeles Lakers
- Playing career: 1968–1979
- Positions: Shooting guard, small forward
- Number: 44

Career history
- 1968: Kentucky Colonels
- 1968–1971: Wilmington/Delaware Blue Bombers
- 1971–1973: Hartford Capitols
- 1973–1975: Cherry Hill Rookies
- 1977–1979: Lancaster Red Roses
- Stats at Basketball Reference

Reggie Lacefield (April 10, 1945 – December 17, 2023) was an American professional basketball player. He spent one season in the American Basketball Association (ABA) as a member of the Kentucky Colonels during the 1968–69 season.

== Education and career ==
Lacefield attended Western Michigan University where he was selected in the 12th round (155th overall pick) of the 1968 NBA draft by the Los Angeles Lakers, but he never played for them.

Lacefield played in the Eastern Basketball Association (EBA) from 1968 to 1979 for the Wilmington / Delaware Blue Bombers, Hartford Capitols, Cherry Hill Rookies and Lancaster Red Roses.

Lacefield died on December 17, 2023, at the age of 78.
