= Rod Brown (basketball) =

British-American basketball player

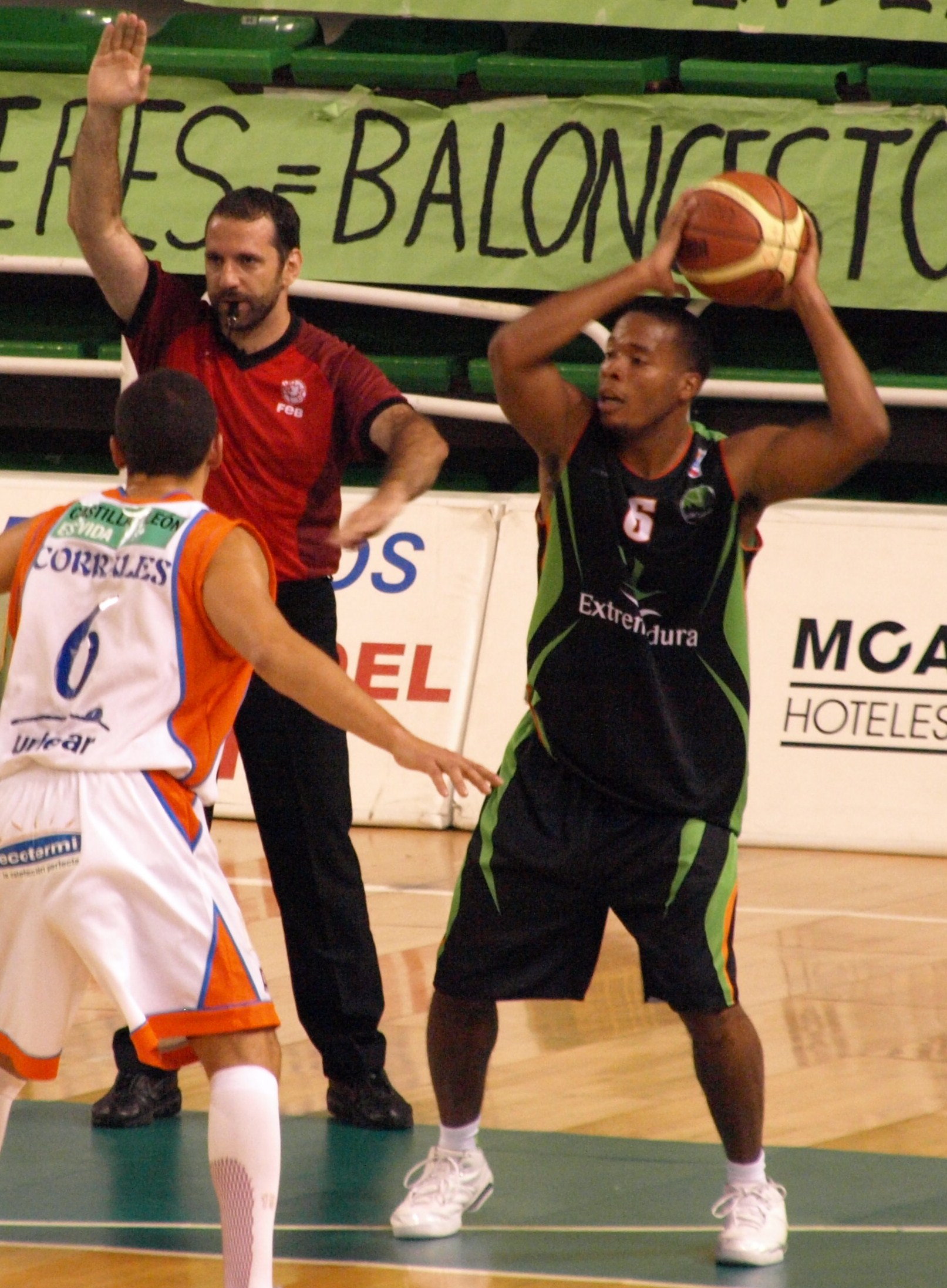

Personal information
- Born: September 9, 1978 (age 48) Dallas, Texas
- Listed height: 6 ft 1 in (1.85 m)

Career information
- College: Pratt CC (1996–1998); Western Michigan (1998–2000)
- NBA draft: 2000: undrafted
- Playing career: 2000–2015
- Position: Point guard

Career history
- 2000–2003: London Leopards
- 2003: Chester Jets
- 2003: London Towers
- 2003–2005: Inca
- 2006–2007: Menorca Bàsquet
- 2007: A.E.L. Larissa
- 2007–2008: A.E.P. Olympias Patras
- 2008: Gipuzkoa
- 2008–2009: Cáceres
- 2009–2010: Udinese
- 2010: ETHA Engomis
- 2011: Ourense
- 2011–2012: Lugano Tigers
- 2013: Plymouth Raiders
- 2013–2015: London Lions

Lelton Gerard "Rod" Brown (born September 9, 1978) is an American former professional basketball player. Born in Dallas, Texas, he holds dual British-American citizenship.

== Professional career ==
After graduating from Western Michigan University in 2000, the point guard joined English team Greater London Leopards. When the franchise folded in 2003, Brown joined Chester Jets but walked out on the team during pre-season training before even playing a game, and subsequently joined Leopards' former rivals London Towers. In 2005, Brown moved to Spain to play for lower-league CB Inca, and the following year made the step-up to the Liga ACB – one of Europe's top leagues – to play for Menorca Bàsquet.

In February 2007, he moved from Spain to Greece, and the Greek Basket League, where he signed for A.E.L. Larissa and played out the remainder of the season. During the summer he signed for League-rivals A.E.P. Olympias Patras who were also competing in the FIBA EuroCup. In the continental competition, Brown averaged 9.3 points and 25.5 minutes-per-game, whilst domestically, he scored 6 points per game in 10 games. In January, midway through the 2007–08 season Brown returned to Spain to sign for Bruesa GBC of the second-tier Liga Española de Baloncesto (LEB), helping the team finish as playoff winners and earned a second-place finish in the League and promotion to the Liga ACB. Brown remained in the LEB for the 2008–09 season after signing for Cáceres 2016.

Brown spent the 2009–10 season playing in Italy's second division, LegADue, with Udinese. He averaged 10.4 points in 33 minutes-per-game, appearing 22 times throughout the season. In 2010 Brown joined ETHA Engomis of Cyprus where he played just three League games and averaged just 4.3 points. After his brief period in Cyprus, the point guard returned to Spain again and signed for Aguas de Sousas Ourense in the LEB Oro, for the remainder of the 2010–11 season. Ourense struggled throughout the campaign and finished bottom of the 18-team League with a 9–25 record. Brown played 15 games for the club, and averaged 8.9 points in 26.8 minutes-per-game.

In 2011, Brown moved to Switzerland and the Lugano Tigers of the LNBA where he enjoyed one of his most successful recent seasons. Tigers dominated the League, claiming the regular season title with a 20–4 record and winning the playoffs over rivals Les Lions de Geneve, with a 3–2 series victory. Brown featured in 25 games throughout the campaign, and averaged 11.8 points and 6 assists in 31.7 minutes per game.

In January 2013, Brown returned to England to sign for British Basketball League side Plymouth Raiders, replacing Raiders' former League MVP Jeremy Bell who had just departed the club.
