= Thomas Wilder =

American basketball player (born 1995)

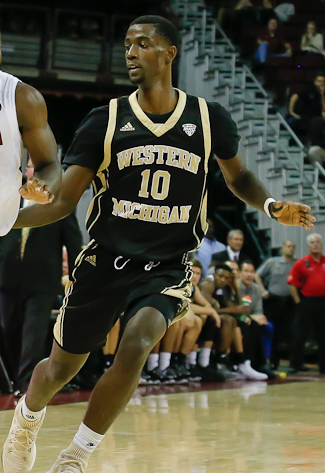
- Wilder with the Western Michigan Broncos in 2017

Personal information
- Born: May 14, 1995 (age 31)
- Listed height: 6 ft 3 in (1.91 m)
- Listed weight: 190 lb (86 kg)

Career information
- High school: Quakerdale Prep (New Providence, Iowa)
- College: Western Michigan (2014–2018)
- NBA draft: 2018: undrafted
- Playing career: 2018–2023
- Position: Point guard

Career history
- 2018: Riesen Ludwigsburg
- 2018–2020: Windy City Bulls
- 2021–2022: Batumi-RSU
- 2022–2023: Nürnberg Falcons BC

Career highlights
- 2× First-team All-MAC (2017, 2018); MAC All-Freshman team (2015)

Thomas Javaine Wilder (born May 14, 1995) is an American former professional basketball player. He played college basketball for the Western Michigan Broncos. Wilder played professionally in the NBA G League and overseas in Germany and Georgia.

== College career ==
Wilder played college basketball for the Western Michigan Broncos. He planned to participate in the 2017 NBA draft but withdrew his name and returned for his senior season. As a senior, he averaged 18.8 points, 4.3 assists, 4.4 rebounds and 1.9 steals per game.

== Professional career ==
Prior to the 2018 NBA draft, Wilder had workouts with several teams, Including the Sacramento Kings, Chicago Bulls, Milwaukee Bucks, and the Charlotte Hornets. After going undrafted in the 2018 NBA draft, Wilder was later included in the 2018 NBA Summer League roster of the Utah Jazz. He signed with for MHP Riesen Ludwigsburg of the German top tier on September 4, 2018. Wilder played two games for the German club then returned to the United States to sign a contract to play for the Windy City Bulls of the NBA G League. On January 16, 2020, Wilder recorded 16 points, five rebounds and three assists in a loss to the Lakeland Magic.

On January 3, 2021, Wilder signed with Batumi-RSU of the Georgian Superliga.
