= Ohio Bobcats men's basketball statistical leaders =

The Ohio Bobcats men's basketball statistical leaders are individual statistical leaders of the Ohio Bobcats men's basketball program in various categories, including points, rebounds, assists, steals, and blocks. Within those areas, the lists identify single-game, single-season, and career leaders. The Bobcats represent Ohio University in the NCAA's Mid-American Conference.

Ohio began competing in intercollegiate basketball in 1907. However, the school's record book does not generally list records from before the 1950s, as records from before this period are often incomplete and inconsistent. The NCAA did not officially record assists as a stat until the 1983–84 season, and blocks and steals until the 1985–86 season, but Ohio's record book includes players in these stats before these seasons. These lists are updated through the end of the 2021–22 season.

== Scoring ==
Career
Rk	Player	Points	Seasons
1	Dave Jamerson	2,336	1985–86 1987–88 1988–89 1989–90
2	Paul Graham	2,170	1985–86 1986–87 1987–88 1988–89
3	Gary Trent	2,108	1992–93 1993–94 1994–95
4	D.J. Cooper	2,075	2009–10 2010–11 2011–12 2012–13
5	Brandon Hunter	2,012	1999–00 2000–01 2001–02 2002–03
6	Geno Ford	1,752	1993–94 1994–95 1995–96 1996–97
7	Steve Skaggs	1,741	1975–76 1976–77 1977–78 1978–79
8	Leon Williams	1,716	2004–05 2008–09 2006–07 2007–08
9	Jerome Tillman	1,635	2005–06 2006–07 2007–08 2008–09
10	Walter Luckett	1,625	1972–73 1973–74 1975–76

Season
Rk	Player	Points	Season
1	Dave Jamerson	874	1989–90
2	Gary Trent	837	1993–94
3	Gary Trent	757	1994–95
4	Mark Sears	668	2021–22
5	Walter Luckett	657	1974–75
6	Paul Graham	645	1988–89
7	Walter Luckett	617	1973–74
8	Brandon Hunter	614	2002–03
9	Antonio Campbell	598	2015–16
10	Tim Joyce	594	1978–79

Single game
Rk	Player	Points	Season	Opponent
1	Dave Jamerson	60	1989–90	12/21/89
2	Dave Jamerson	52	1988–89	2/24/89
3	Gary Trent	46	1993–94	2/19/94
4	Fred Moore	45	1956–57	3/1/57
5	D.J. Cooper	43	2010–11	12/18/10
	Gerald McKee	43	1968–69	12/19/68
7	Gary Trent	41	1993–94	12/18/93
8	Dave Jamerson	40	1989–90	1/17/90
	Dave Jamerson	40	1989–90	12/29/89
9	Dave Jamerson	39	1989–90	12/30/89
	Dave Jamerson	39	1987–88	12/30/89

== Rebounds ==
Career
Rk	Player	Rebounds	Seasons
1	Brandon Hunter	1,103	1999–00 2000–01 2001–02 2002–03
2	Leon Williams	1,090	2004–05 2008–09 2006–07 2007–08
3	Gary Trent	1,050	1992–93 1993–94 1994–95
4	John Devereaux	957	1980–81 1981–82 1982–83 1980–81
5	Dave Scott	904	1956–57 1957–58 1958–59
6	John Schroeder	884	1964–65 1965–66 1966–67
7	Bunk Adams	865	1958–59 1959–60 1960–61
8	Jerome Tillman	860	2005–06 2006–07 2007–08 2008–09
9	Craig Love	805	1968–69 1969–70 1970–71
10	Antonio Campbell	801	2013–14 2014–15 2015–16 2016–17

Season
Rk	Player	Rebounds	Season
1	Howard Joliff	468	1959–60
2	Gary Trent	423	1994–95
3	Shaun Stonerook	387	1999–00
4	Brandon Hunter	378	2002–03
5	Gary Trent	377	1993–94
6	Antonio Campbell	358	2015–16
7	Leon Williams	325	2007–08
8	Craig Love	322	1969–70
9	Dave Scott	319	1958–59
10	John Devereaux	312	1982–83

Single game
Rk	Player	Rebounds	Season	Opponent
1	Dave Scott	34	1958–59	3/2/59
2	Howard Joliff	28	1959–60	1/23/60
	Dave Scott	28	1958–59	12/4/58
4	Brandon Hunter	26	2002–03	1/8/03
	Ken Fowlkes	26	1965–66	12/30/65
	Howard Joliff	26	1959–60	3/11/60
	Howard Joliff	26	1958–59	2/11/59
	Bunk Adams	26	1958–59	1/24/59
9	Dave Scott	25	1956–57	1/18/57
10	Brandon Hunter	24	2002–03	12/31/02
	Don Hilt	24	1964–65	2/22/65
	Howard Joliff	24	1959–60	1/16/60

== Assists ==
Career
Rk	Player	Assists	Seasons
1	D.J. Cooper	934	2009–10 2010–11 2011–12 2012–13
2	Dennis Whitaker	651	1986–87 1987–88 1988–89 1989–90
3	Paul Baron	579	1982–83 1983–84 1984–85 1984–85
4	Jason Preston	486	2018–19 2019–20 2020–21
5	Jaaron Simmons	475	2015–16 2016–17
6	Roger Smith	401	1983–84 1984–85 1985–86 1986–87
7	Sonny Troutman	384	2003–04 2004–05 2005–06 2006–07
8	Kirk Lehman	332	1978–79 1979–80 1980–81 1981–82
	Nate Craig	329	1988–89 1989–90 1990–91 1991–92
10	Jackson Paveletzke	315	2024–25 2025–26

Season
Rk	Player	Assists	Season
1	Jaaron Simmons	275	2015–16
2	D. J. Cooper	263	2010–11
3	D. J. Cooper	242	2012–13
4	Jason Preston	238	2019–20
5	D. J. Cooper	218	2009–10
6	D. J. Cooper	211	2011–12
7	Jaaron Simmons	200	2016–17
8	Dennis Whitaker	199	1987–88
9	Paul Baron	190	1984–85
10	Dennis Whitaker	185	1989–90

Single game
Rk	Player	Assists	Season	Opponent
1	D. J. Cooper	17	2012–13	1/5/13
	Jaaron Simmons	17	2015–16	1/26/16
3	Dennis Whitaker	16	1987–88	2/20/88
4	D. J. Cooper	15	2010–11	1/12/11
5	D. J. Cooper	14	2010–11	2/26/11
	D. J. Cooper	14	2012–13	12/22/12
	D. J. Cooper	14	2012–13	11/16/12
8	Jaaron Simmons	13	2016–17	11/21/16
	D. J. Cooper	13	2012–13	12/8/12
	Dennis Whitaker	13	1989–90	12/30/89
	Dennis Whitaker	13	1987–88	12/7/87
	Spindle Graves	13	1978–79	2/7/79
	Jason Preston	13	2019–20	11/5/19
	Jason Preston	13	2019–20	12/4/19

== Steals ==
Career
Rk	Player	Steals	Seasons
1	D.J. Cooper	327	2009–10 2010–11 2011–12 2012–13
2	Sonny Troutman	259	2003–04 2004–05 2005–06 2006–07
3	Dennis Whitaker	197	1986–87 1987–88 1988–89 1989–90
4	Paul Graham	196	1985–86 1986–87 1987–88 1988–89
5	Nate Craig	149	1988–89 1989–90 1990–91 1991–92
6	Steve Esterkamp	148	1999–00 2000–01 2001–02 2002–03
7	Curtis Simmons	142	1993–94 1994–95 1995–96 1996–97
	Robert Tatum	142	1982–83 1983–84 1984–85 1985–86
9	Corey Reed	141	1995–96 1996–97 1997–98 1998–99 1999–00
	Paul Baron	141	1982–83 1983–84 1984–85 1984–85
	Nick Kellogg	141	2010–11 2011–12 2012–13 2013–14
	Miles Brown	141	2019–20 2020–21 2021–22 2022–23 2023–24

Season
Rk	Player	Steals	Season
1	D.J. Cooper	93	2009–10
2	D.J. Cooper	85	2011–12
3	Sonny Troutman	82	2006–07
4	D.J. Cooper	81	2010–11
5	Sonny Troutman	72	2004–05
6	D.J. Cooper	68	2012–13
7	Nate Craig	64	1990–91
8	Ben Vander Plas	62	2021–22
9	Paul Graham	60	1989–90
	Dennis Whitaker	60	1987–88

Single game
Rk	Player	Steals	Season	Opponent
1	Steve Esterkamp	9	2001–02	2/2/02
2	D.J. Cooper	8	2009–10	12/18/10
	Antony Jones	8	1999–00	12/3/99
	Dave Terk	8	1975–76	11/28/75
5	D.J. Cooper	7	2010–11	11/15/10
	D.J. Cooper	7	2009–10	2/4/10
	D.J. Cooper	7	2009–10	1/23/10
	Paul Graham	7	1988–89	2/15/89
	Paul Graham	7	1988–89	2/8/89
	Jeremy Fears	7	2004–05	1/12/05
	Jason Preston	7	2019–20	11/5/19

== Blocks ==
Career
Rk	Player	Blocks	Seasons
1	Jason Terry	262	1992–93 1993–94 1994–95 1995–96
2	John Devereaux	260	1980–81 1981–82 1982–83 1980–81
3	Patrick Flomo	222	1998–99 1999–00 2000–01 2001–02
4	Jon Smith	147	2011–12 2012–13 2013–14
5	Doug Taylor	146	2015–16 2016–17 2017–18 2018–19
6	Leon Williams	138	2004–05 2008–09 2006–07 2007–08
7	AJ Clayton	133	2021–22 2022–23 2023–24 2024–25
8	Maurice Ndour	123	2013–14 2014–15
9	John Rhodes	121	1984–85 1985–86 1986–87 1987–88
10	Antonio Campbell	119	2013–14 2014–15 2015–16 2016–17

Season
Rk	Player	Blocks	Season
1	Patrick Flomo	105	2000–01
2	John Devereaux	99	1982–83
3	Jason Terry	89	1995–96
4	Jason Terry	85	1993–94
5	Jason Terry	76	1994–95
6	John Devereaux	70	1983–84
7	Maurice Ndour	68	2014–15
8	Antonio Campbell	63	2015–16
9	Doug Taylor	61	2017–18
	John Devereaux	61	1981–82

Single game
Rk	Player	Blocks	Season	Opponent
1	Jason Terry	9	1995–96	2/7/96
	Jason Terry	9	1994–95	2/15/95
	Jason Terry	9	1993–94	12/11/93
	John Devereaux	9	1982–83	12/11/82
5	Patrick Flomo	8	2000–01	1/17/01
	Patrick Flomo	8	2000–01	1/13/01
	Jon Smith	8	2013–14	1/12/14
8	Maurice Ndour	7	2014–15	12/30/14
	Patrick Flomo	7	2000–01	11/22/01
	John Devereaux	7	1982–83	1/22/83
