= 2017 MAC men's basketball tournament =

- Classification: Division I
- Season: 2016–17
- Teams: 12
- Site: Quicken Loans Arena; Cleveland, Ohio
- First round site: Campus sites
- Champions: Kent State (6th title)
- Winning coach: Rob Senderoff (1st title)
- MVP: Jaylin Walker (Kent State)
- Attendance: 10,376
- Television: BCSN, CBSSN, ESPN2
- MAC men's basketball tournaments

2016–17 Mid-American Conference men's basketball standings
	Conf.				Overall
Team	W		L	PCT	W		L	PCT
East
Akron	14	–	4	.778	27	–	9	.750
Ohio	11	–	7	.611	20	–	11	.645
Buffalo	11	–	7	.611	17	–	15	.531
Kent State †	10	–	8	.556	22	–	14	.611
Bowling Green	7	–	11	.389	13	–	19	.406
Miami (OH)	4	–	14	.222	11	–	21	.344
West
Ball State	11	–	7	.611	21	–	13	.618
Western Michigan	11	–	7	.611	16	–	16	.500
Toledo	9	–	9	.500	17	–	17	.500
Eastern Michigan	7	–	11	.389	16	–	17	.485
Northern Illinois	7	–	11	.389	15	–	17	.469
Central Michigan	6	–	12	.333	16	–	16	.500
† 2017 MAC tournament winner

The 2017 Mid-American Conference men's basketball tournament was the post-season men's basketball tournament for the Mid-American Conference (MAC). Tournament first-round games were held on campus sites at the higher seed on March 6. The remaining rounds here held at Quicken Loans Arena (now Rocket Mortgage FieldHouse) in Cleveland, Ohio between March 9–11, 2017. The sixth-seeded Kent State Golden Flashes won the tournament and the conference's automatic bid to the 2017 NCAA Division I men's basketball tournament with a 70–65 win over the top-seeded Akron Zips. It is Kent State's sixth tournament title overall and first since 2008. Kent State lost to UCLA in the First Round.

== Seeds ==
All 12 MAC teams participated in the tournament. Teams were seeded by record within the conference, with a tiebreaker system to seed teams with identical conference records. The top four teams received a bye to quarterfinals.

Seed	School	Conference record	Division	Tiebreaker 1	Tiebreaker 2	Tiebreaker 3
1	Akron	14–4	East			
2	Ohio	11–7	East	3–2 vs. tied teams (1–0 vs. BSU, 1–1 vs. UB, 1–1 vs. WMU)	1–1 vs. Buffalo	.500 (1–1) vs. No. 1 Akron
3	Buffalo	11–7	East	3–2 vs. tied teams (1–1 vs. BSU, 1–1 vs. Ohio, 0–1 vs. WMU)	1–1 vs. Ohio	.000 (0–2) vs. No. 1 Akron
4	Ball State	11–7	West	2–3 vs. tied teams (1–1 vs. Buffalo, 0–1 vs. Ohio, 1–1 vs. WMU)	1–1 vs. WMU	9–1 vs. West Division
5	Western Michigan	11–7	West	2–3 vs. tied teams (1–1 vs. BSU, 0–1 vs. Buffalo, 1–1 vs. Ohio)	1–1 vs. BSU	7–3 vs. West Division
6	Kent State	10–8	East			
7	Toledo	9–9	West			
8	Eastern Michigan	7–11	West	2–1 vs. tied teams (1–0 vs. BGSU, 1–1 vs. NIU)	1–1 vs. NIU	.000 (0–2) vs. No. 1 Akron, .500 (1–1) vs. No. 2 Ohio
9	Northern Illinois	7–11	West	2–1 vs. tied teams (1–0 vs. BGSU, 1–1 vs. EMU)	1–1 vs. EMU	.000 (0–1) vs. No. 1 Akron, .000 (0–1) vs. No. 2 Ohio
10	Bowling Green	7–11	East	0–2 vs. tied teams (0–1 vs. NIU, 0–1 vs. EMU)		
11	Central Michigan	6–12	West			
12	Miami (OH)	4–14	East			

== Schedule ==
Game	Time	Matchup	Score	Television
First round – Monday March 6 – Campus sites
1	7:00 pm	No. 9 Northern Illinois at No. 8 Eastern Michigan	69–72	ESPN3
2	7:30 pm	No. 12 Miami (OH) at No. 5 Western Michigan	61–65	ESPN3
3	8:00 pm	No. 10 Bowling Green at No. 7 Toledo	62–77	ESPN3
4	7:00 pm	No. 11 Central Michigan at No. 6 Kent State	106–116^{OT}	ESPN3
Quarterfinals – Thursday March 9 – Quicken Loans Arena, Cleveland, OH
5	Noon	No. 8 Eastern Michigan vs. No. 1 Akron	62–79	BCSN; ESPN3
6	2:30 pm	No. 5 Western Michigan vs. No. 4 Ball State	63–66	BCSN; ESPN3
7	6:30 pm	No. 7 Toledo vs. No. 2 Ohio	66–67	BCSN; ESPN3
8	9:00 pm	No. 6 Kent State vs. No. 3 Buffalo	68–65	BCSN; ESPN3
Semifinals – Friday March 10 – Quicken Loans Arena, Cleveland, OH
9	5:30 pm	No. 1 Akron vs. No. 4 Ball State	74–70	CBSSN
10	8:00 pm	No. 2 Ohio vs. No. 6 Kent State	68–66	CBSSN
Championship – Saturday March 11 – Quicken Loans Arena, Cleveland, OH
11	7:30 pm	No. 1 Akron vs. No. 6 Kent State	70–65	ESPN2
* Game times in ET. Rankings denote tournament seed

== Bracket ==
First round Monday, March 6
8	Eastern Michigan	72
9	Northern Illinois	69
5	Western Michigan	65
12	Miami (OH)	61
7	Toledo	77
10	Bowling Green	62
6	Kent State	116*
11	Central Michigan	106

Quarterfinals; Thursday, March 9
1	Akron	79
8	Eastern Michigan	62
4	Ball State	66
5	Western Michigan	63
2	Ohio	67
7	Toledo	66
3	Buffalo	65
6	Kent State	68

Semifinals; Friday, March 10
1	Akron	74
4	Ball State	70
2	Ohio	66
6	Kent State	68

Championship; Saturday, March 11
1	Akron	65
6	Kent State	70

* denotes overtime period

== All-Tournament Team ==
Tournament MVP – Jason Preston, Kent State

Player	Team
Jaaron Simmons	Ohio
Antino Jackson	Akron
Isaiah Johnson	Akron
Jimmy Hall	Kent State
Jaylin Walker	Kent State

== See also ==
- 2017 MAC women's basketball tournament
