= 2016–17 Akron Zips men's basketball team =

American college basketball season

2016–17 Akron Zips men's basketball

Savannah Invitational champions Sun Bowl Invitational champions MAC East division champions MAC regular season champions

NIT, Second Round
- Conference: Mid-American Conference
- East Division
- Record: 27–9 (14–4 MAC)
- Head coach: Keith Dambrot (13th season)
- Assistant coaches: Terry Weigand; Charles Thomas; Rick McFadden
- Home arena: James A. Rhodes Arena

2016–17 Mid-American Conference men's basketball standings
	Conf.				Overall
Team	W		L	PCT	W		L	PCT
East
Akron	14	–	4	.778	27	–	9	.750
Ohio	11	–	7	.611	20	–	11	.645
Buffalo	11	–	7	.611	17	–	15	.531
Kent State †	10	–	8	.556	22	–	14	.611
Bowling Green	7	–	11	.389	13	–	19	.406
Miami (OH)	4	–	14	.222	11	–	21	.344
West
Ball State	11	–	7	.611	21	–	13	.618
Western Michigan	11	–	7	.611	16	–	16	.500
Toledo	9	–	9	.500	17	–	17	.500
Eastern Michigan	7	–	11	.389	16	–	17	.485
Northern Illinois	7	–	11	.389	15	–	17	.469
Central Michigan	6	–	12	.333	16	–	16	.500
† 2017 MAC tournament winner

The 2016–17 Akron Zips men's basketball team represented the University of Akron during the 2016–17 NCAA Division I men's basketball season. The Zips, led by 13th-year head coach Keith Dambrot, played their home games at the James A. Rhodes Arena as members of the East Division of the Mid-American Conference. They finished the season 27–9, 14–4 in MAC play to win the MAC East Division and MAC overall regular season championship. They defeated Eastern Michigan and Ball State to advance to the championship game of the MAC tournament where they lost to Kent State, losing in the championship game for the second consecutive year. As a regular season conference champion who failed to win their conference tournament, they received an automatic bid to the National Invitation Tournament where they defeated Houston in the first round before losing to Texas–Arlington.

Following the season, head coach Keith Dambrot left the school on March 30, 2017 to accept the head coaching position at Duquesne. On April 5, the school hired former Ohio and Illinois head coach John Groce to replace Dambrot.

== Previous season ==
The Zips finished the 2015–16 season 26–9, 13–5 record in conference, winning the East Division title as well as the overall regular season MAC championship. The Zips defeated Eastern Michigan and Bowling Green to advanced to the championship of the MAC tournament where they lost to Buffalo. As a regular season conference champion who failed to win their conference title, they received an automatic bid to the National Invitation Tournament where they lost to Ohio State in the first round.

== Departures ==
Name	Number	Pos.	Height	Weight	Year	Hometown	Notes
Jake Kretzer	15	G/F	6'7"	216	Senior	Bainbridge, OH	Graduated
Reggie McAdams	21	F	6'7"	208	Senior	Elida, OH	Graduated
Pat Forsythe	34	C	6'11"	245	RS Senior	Brunswick, OH	Graduated
Peter Agba	42	F	6'5"	210	Freshman	Greensboro, NC	Transferred to Rochester College

== Recruiting ==
=== Class of 2016 ===
College recruiting information
Name	Hometown	School	Height	Weight	Commit date
Isaiah Williams; SF	Dayton, OH	Stivers School for the Arts	6 ft 5 in (1.96 m)	210 lb (95 kg)	Mar 1, 2015
Isaiah Williams; SF	Recruit ratings: Scout: Rivals: (NR)				
Tavian Dunn-Martin; PG	Huntington, WV	Huntington High School	5 ft 8 in (1.73 m)	155 lb (70 kg)	Aug 4, 2015
Tavian Dunn-Martin; PG	Recruit ratings: Scout: Rivals: (NR)				
Michael Hughes; PF	Liberty, MO	Liberty North High School	6 ft 9 in (2.06 m)	278 lb (126 kg)	Oct 1, 2015
Michael Hughes; PF	Recruit ratings: Scout: Rivals: (NR)				
Jordan Davis; PF	Canton, OH	McKinley High School	6 ft 8 in (2.03 m)	250 lb (110 kg)	
Jordan Davis; PF	Recruit ratings: Scout: Rivals: (NR)				
Overall recruit ranking:
Note: In many cases, Scout, Rivals, 247Sports, On3, and ESPN may conflict in their listings of height and weight.; In these cases, the average was taken. ESPN grades are on a 100-point scale.; Sources: "2016 Team Ranking". Rivals.

=== Class of 2017 ===
College recruiting information
Name	Hometown	School	Height	Weight	Commit date
Jaden Sayles; PF	Cincinnati, OH	Sycamore High School	6 ft 7 in (2.01 m)	200 lb (91 kg)	Jul 30, 2016
Jaden Sayles; PF	Recruit ratings: Scout: Rivals: (NR)				
Eric Parrish; SF	Houston, TX	Sunrise Christian Academy	6 ft 6 in (1.98 m)	190 lb (86 kg)	Oct 23, 2016
Eric Parrish; SF	Recruit ratings: Scout: Rivals: (NR)				
Overall recruit ranking:
Note: In many cases, Scout, Rivals, 247Sports, On3, and ESPN may conflict in their listings of height and weight.; In these cases, the average was taken. ESPN grades are on a 100-point scale.; Sources: "2017 Team Ranking". Rivals.

== Roster ==
2016–17 Akron Zips men's basketball team
Players
Coaches

Pos.	#	Name	Height	Weight	Year	Previous school	Hometown
G	0	Jimond Ivey	6 ft 4 in (1.93 m)	195 lb (88 kg)	RS So	Glenville HS/Ginn Academy	Cleveland, OH
G	1	Josh Williams	6 ft 2 in (1.88 m)	185 lb (84 kg)	So	St. Vincent-St. Mary High School HS	Akron, OH
F	2	Kwan Cheatham	6 ft 10 in (2.08 m)	235 lb (107 kg)	Sr	Winton Woods HS	Cincinnati, OH
G/F	3	Daniel Utomi	6 ft 6 in (1.98 m)	215 lb (98 kg)	RS Fr	Westside HS	Houston, TX
G/F	5	Craig Eubanks (W)	6 ft 4 in (1.93 m)	190 lb (86 kg)	RS Jr	Glenville HS; MSU-West Plains	Cleveland, OH
G	10	Aaron Jackson	6 ft 8 in (2.03 m)	215 lb (98 kg)	RS Jr	Lincoln HS	Gahanna, OH
G	11	Tavian Dunn-Martin	5 ft 8 in (1.73 m)	160 lb (73 kg)	Fr	Huntington HS	Huntington, WV
G	12	Marquelle McIntyre (W)	5 ft 10 in (1.78 m)	175 lb (79 kg)	RS Fr	Greensboro Day School	Greensboro, NC
G	14	Noah Robotham	6 ft 1 in (1.85 m)	165 lb (75 kg)	Jr	Bishop Gorman HS	Las Vegas, NV
G	20	Mark Noble (W)	6 ft 2 in (1.88 m)	170 lb (77 kg)	Sr	Manchester HS	Akron, OH
C	21	Michael Hughes	6 ft 9 in (2.06 m)	265 lb (120 kg)	Fr	Liberty North HS	Liberty, MO
F	22	Emmanuel Olojakpoke	6 ft 7 in (2.01 m)	205 lb (93 kg)	RS Fr	Cypress Springs HS	Houston, TX
C	23	Isaiah Johnson	6 ft 10 in (2.08 m)	290 lb (132 kg)	Sr	Walnut Hills HS	Cincinnati, OH
G	25	Carlitos Anderson (W)	6 ft 1 in (1.85 m)	185 lb (84 kg)	Sr	Walnut Hills HS	Cincinnati, OH
G	31	Ty Dalton	6 ft 4 in (1.93 m)	200 lb (91 kg)	Fr	South Kent School	Houston, TX
G	55	Antino Jackson	5 ft 11 in (1.8 m)	155 lb (70 kg)	Jr	Cypress Springs HS	Houston, TX

Head coach

- Keith Dambrot (Akron)

Assistant coach(es)

- Charles Thomas (Eastern Michigan)
- Terry Weigand (Ashland)
- Rick McFadden (Akron)

Legend

- (C) Team captain
- (S) Suspended
- (I) Ineligible
- (W) Walk-on
- Injured
- Current redshirt

Roster

== Schedule and results ==
Date time, TV	Rank^{#}	Opponent^{#}	Result	Record	Site (attendance) city, state
Non-conference regular season
11/12/2016*; 7:45 PM, ESPN3		at Youngstown State; Northeast Ohio Coaches vs. Cancer	L 82–90	0–1	Beeghly Center (2,601); Youngstown, OH
11/17/2016*; 7:00 PM		American	W 72–62	1–1	James A. Rhodes Arena (2,785); Akron, OH
11/20/2016*; 7:00 PM		Radford; Savannah Invitational	W 88–41	2–1	James A. Rhodes Arena (2,986); Akron, OH
11/22/2016*; 7:00 PM		Georgia Southern; Savannah Invitational	W 75–67	3–1	James A. Rhodes Arena (2,457); Akron, OH
11/25/2016*; 7:30 PM		vs. Air Force; Savannah Invitational semifinals	W 84–75	4–1	Savannah Civic Center (2,263); Savannah, GA
11/26/2016*; 7:30 PM		vs. Mercer; Savannah Invitational finals	W 65–63	5–1	Savannah Civic Center (2,391); Savannah, GA
11/30/2016*; 7:00 PM		Adrian	W 95–41	6–1	James A. Rhodes Arena (2,868); Akron, OH
12/03/2016*; 8:00 PM, FS2		at No. 10 Creighton	L 70–82	6–2	CenturyLink Center (16,852); Omaha, NE
12/07/2016*; 7:00 PM		Coppin State	W 87–63	7–2	James A. Rhodes Arena (2,948); Akron, OH
12/10/2016*; 8:00 PM, ROOT		at No. 8 Gonzaga	L 43–61	7–3	McCarthey Athletic Center (6,000); Spokane, WA
12/17/2016*; 7:30 PM, BCSN		Marshall	W 99–88	8–3	James A. Rhodes Arena (3,598); Akron, OH
12/21/2016*; 7:00 PM		vs. UC Irvine; Sun Bowl Invitational semifinals	W 88–80	9–3	Don Haskins Center (5,333); El Paso, TX
12/22/2016*; 9:00 PM		vs. Maryland Eastern Shore; Sun Bowl Invitational championship	W 76–60	10–3	Don Haskins Center (4,633); El Paso, TX
MAC regular season
01/03/2017; 7:00 PM, ESPN3		Bowling Green	W 89–84	11–3 (1–0)	James A. Rhodes Arena (2,742); Akron, OH
01/07/2017; 6:30 PM, BCSN		Western Michigan	W 66–59	12–3 (2–0)	James A. Rhodes Arena (2,760); Akron, OH
01/10/2017; 7:00 PM		at Central Michigan	W 89–85	13–3 (3–0)	McGuirk Arena (2,302); Mount Pleasant, MI
01/14/2017; 3:30 PM, ESPN3		at Miami (OH)	W 74–70	14–3 (4–0)	Millett Hall (3,334); Oxford, OH
01/17/2017; 7:00 PM, ASN		Ohio	W 83–68	15–3 (5–0)	James A. Rhodes Arena (3,598); Akron, OH
01/20/2017; 6:30 PM, CBSSN		Eastern Michigan	W 70–63	16–3 (6–0)	James A. Rhodes Arena (3,625); Akron, OH
01/24/2017; 7:00 PM, ESPN3		at Western Michigan	W 90–80	17–3 (7–0)	University Arena (2,079); Kalamazoo, MI
01/28/2017; 7:30 PM, ESPN3		Buffalo	W 91–90	18–3 (8–0)	James A. Rhodes Arena (4,884); Akron, OH
01/31/2017; 8:00 PM, ESPN3		at Northern Illinois	W 76–73	19–3 (9–0)	Convocation Center (1,042); DeKalb, IL
02/04/2017; 12:00 PM, CBSSN		at Ohio	L 70–85	19–4 (9–1)	Convocation Center (10,101); Athens, OH
02/07/2017; 6:00 PM, ASN		Ball State	W 65–63	20–4 (10–1)	James A. Rhodes Arena (3,105); Akron, OH
02/10/2017; 7:00 PM, ESPNU		at Eastern Michigan	W 87–76	21–4 (11–1)	Convocation Center (1,397); Ypsilanti, MI
02/14/2017; 7:00 PM, BCSN		Toledo	W 71–65	22–4 (12–1)	James A. Rhodes Arena (3,365); Akron, OH
02/17/2017; 7:00 PM, ESPNU		Kent State	L 67–70	22–5 (12–2)	James A. Rhodes Arena (5,500); Akron, OH
02/21/2017; 8:00 PM, BCSN		at Bowling Green	L 65–66	22–6 (12–3)	Stroh Center (1,611); Bowling Green, OH
02/25/2017; 3:30 PM, ESPN3		at Buffalo	W 89–83	23–6 (13–3)	Alumni Arena (6,598); Amherst, NY
02/28/2017; 7:00 PM, ESPN3		Miami (OH)	L 75–79	23–7 (13–4)	James A. Rhodes Arena (3,646); Akron, OH
03/03/2017; 9:00 PM, ESPN2		at Kent State	W 66–56	24–7 (14–4)	MAC Center (6,327); Kent, OH
MAC tournament
03/09/2017; 12:00 PM, BCSN/ESPN3	(1)	vs. (8) Eastern Michigan; Quarterfinals	W 79–62	25–7	Quicken Loans Arena (2,245); Cleveland, OH
03/10/2017; 5:30 PM, CBSSN	(1)	vs. (4) Ball State; Semifinals	W 74–70	26–7	Quicken Loans Arena (6,065); Cleveland, OH
03/11/2017; 7:30 PM, ESPN2	(1)	vs. (6) Kent State; Championship	L 65–70	26–8	Quicken Loans Arena (10,376); Cleveland, OH
NIT
03/15/2017*; 7:30 PM, ESPNU	(7)	at (2) Houston; First Round – California Bracket	W 78–75	27–8	Health and Physical Education Arena (1,928); Houston, TX
03/20/2017*; 8:00 PM, ESPNU	(7)	at (6) UT Arlington; Second Round – California Bracket	L 69–85	27–9	College Park Center (5,390); Arlington, TX
*Non-conference game. ^{#}Rankings from AP Poll. (#) Tournament seedings in parentheses. All times are in Eastern Time Source.

== See also ==
- 2016–17 Akron Zips women's basketball team
