= 2016–17 Kent State Golden Flashes men's basketball team =

American college basketball season

2016–17 Kent State Golden Flashes men's basketball

MAC tournament champions

NCAA tournament, First Round
- Conference: Mid-American Conference
- East Division
- Record: 22–14 (10–8 MAC)
- Head coach: Rob Senderoff (6th season)
- Assistant coaches: Eric Haut; Bobby Steinburg; Akeem Miskdeen
- Home arena: MAC Center

2016–17 Mid-American Conference men's basketball standings
	Conf.				Overall
Team	W		L	PCT	W		L	PCT
East
Akron	14	–	4	.778	27	–	9	.750
Ohio	11	–	7	.611	20	–	11	.645
Buffalo	11	–	7	.611	17	–	15	.531
Kent State †	10	–	8	.556	22	–	14	.611
Bowling Green	7	–	11	.389	13	–	19	.406
Miami (OH)	4	–	14	.222	11	–	21	.344
West
Ball State	11	–	7	.611	21	–	13	.618
Western Michigan	11	–	7	.611	16	–	16	.500
Toledo	9	–	9	.500	17	–	17	.500
Eastern Michigan	7	–	11	.389	16	–	17	.485
Northern Illinois	7	–	11	.389	15	–	17	.469
Central Michigan	6	–	12	.333	16	–	16	.500
† 2017 MAC tournament winner

The 2016–17 Kent State Golden Flashes men's basketball team represented Kent State University during the 2016–17 NCAA Division I men's basketball season. The Golden Flashes, led by sixth year head coach Rob Senderoff, played their home games at the Memorial Athletic and Convocation Center, also known as the MAC Center, as members of the East Division of the Mid-American Conference. Kent State finished the regular season 22–14, 10–8 in MAC play to finish fourth in the MAC East division. As the No. 6 seed in the MAC tournament, the Flashes defeated Central Michigan, Buffalo, Ohio, and Akron to win the tournament for the first time since 2008. As a result, the Flashes received the conference's automatic bid to the NCAA tournament as the No. 14 seed in the South region. In the first round, they lost to UCLA.

== Previous season ==
The Golden Flashes finished the 2015–16 season 19–13, 10–8 in MAC play to finish in a tie for third place in the East Division. They lost in the first round of the MAC tournament to Bowling Green. Despite having 19 wins, they did not participate in a postseason tournament.

== Offseason ==
=== Departures ===
Name	Number	Pos.	Height	Weight	Year	Hometown	Notes
Xavier Pollard	1	G	6'4"	210	RS Senior	Bronx, NY	Graduated
Marvin Jones	3	F/C	6'10"	205	RS Junior	Chicago, IL	Graduate transferred to Texas Southern
Chris Ortiz	4	F	6'8"	225	Senior	Brooklyn, NY	Graduated
Kellon Thomas	5	G	5'11"	190	RS Junior	Indianapolis, IN	Graduate transferred to IUPUI
Kahliq Spicer	21	F	6'9"	230	Senior	Detroit, MI	Graduated
Raasean Davis	32	F	6'8"	260	Sophomore	Chicago, IL	Transferred to North Carolina Central

=== Incoming transfers ===
Name	Number	Pos.	Height	Weight	Year	Hometown	Previous School
Adonis DeLaRosa	1	C	7'0"	280	RS Sophomore	Bronx, NY	Junior college transferred from Williston State
Jerrelle DeBerry	3	G	6'5"	200	Junior	Milwaukee, WI	Junior college transferred from Indian Hills CC
Taishaun Johnson	4	G	6'0"	172	Junior	Indianapolis, IN	Transferred from South Alabama. Under NCAA transfer rules, Johnson will have to sit out for the 2016–17 season. Will have two years of remaining eligibility.
Leo Edwards	33	F	6'8"	235	Junior	Detroit, MI	Junior college transferred from Santa Fe College
Kevin Zabo	55	G	6'2"	185	Junior	Gatineau, QE	Junior college transferred from Indian Hills CC

=== 2016 recruiting class ===
College recruiting information
Name	Hometown	School	Height	Weight	Commit date
Yavari Hall; SG	Warrensville Heights, OH	Warrensville Heights High School	6 ft 3 in (1.91 m)	185 lb (84 kg)	Jun 16, 2015
Yavari Hall; SG	Recruit ratings: Scout: Rivals: (74)				
Danny Pippen; PF	Detroit, MI	Allen Academy	6 ft 8 in (2.03 m)	N/A	Oct 4, 2015
Danny Pippen; PF	Recruit ratings: Scout: Rivals: (74)				
Mitch Peterson; SG	Richfield, OH	Walsh Jesuit High School	6 ft 4 in (1.93 m)	190 lb (86 kg)	May 1, 2015
Mitch Peterson; SG	Recruit ratings: Scout: Rivals: (NR)				
Overall recruit ranking:
Note: In many cases, Scout, Rivals, 247Sports, On3, and ESPN may conflict in their listings of height and weight.; In these cases, the average was taken. ESPN grades are on a 100-point scale.; Sources: "2016 Team Ranking". Rivals.

=== 2017 recruiting class ===
College recruiting information (2017)
Name	Hometown	School	Height	Weight	Commit date
B.J. Dulling; SF	Newark, OH	Newark High School	6 ft 6 in (1.98 m)	200 lb (91 kg)	Oct 29, 2015
B.J. Dulling; SF	Recruit ratings: Scout: Rivals: (NR)				
Overall recruit ranking:
Note: In many cases, Scout, Rivals, 247Sports, On3, and ESPN may conflict in their listings of height and weight.; In these cases, the average was taken. ESPN grades are on a 100-point scale.; Sources: "2017 Team Ranking". Rivals.

== Roster ==
2016–17 Kent State Golden Flashes men's basketball team
Players
Coaches

Pos.	#	Name	Height	Weight	Year	Previous school	Hometown
G	0	Jalen Avery	6 ft 0 in (1.83 m)	185 lb (84 kg)	So	Shroder HS	Covington, KY
C	1	Adonis DeLa Rosa	7 ft 0 in (2.13 m)	261 lb (118 kg)	RS So	Christ the King HS; Williston State	Bronx, NY
G/F	2	Rosel Hurley	6 ft 5 in (1.96 m)	190 lb (86 kg)	RS Fr	IMG Academy	Shaker Heights, OH
G	3	Jerrelle DeBerry	6 ft 5 in (1.96 m)	205 lb (93 kg)	Jr	Quality Education Academy; Indian Hills CC	Milwaukee, WI
G	4	Taishaun Johnson	6 ft 0 in (1.83 m)	170 lb (77 kg)	Jr	Pike HS; South Alabama	Indianapolis, IN
F	5	Danny Pippen	6 ft 9 in (2.06 m)	220 lb (100 kg)	Fr	Allen Academy	Detroit, MI
G	11	Jon Fleming	5 ft 9 in (1.75 m)	160 lb (73 kg)	Jr	Fishers HS	Fishers, IN
G	13	Mitch Peterson	6 ft 5 in (1.96 m)	190 lb (86 kg)	Fr	Walsh Jesuit HS	Richfield, OH
F	14	Alonzo Walker	6 ft 6 in (1.98 m)	190 lb (86 kg)	RS Fr	Orangeville Prep	Brampton, ON
G	23	Jaylin Walker	6 ft 1 in (1.85 m)	180 lb (82 kg)	So	Romulus HS	Detroit, MI
G	30	Deon Edwin	6 ft 3 in (1.91 m)	210 lb (95 kg)	RS Jr	Red Lion Christian Academy; Laramie County CC	British Virgin Islands
G	32	Desmond Ridenour	6 ft 3 in (1.91 m)	185 lb (84 kg)	RS Jr	Benedictine; Duquesne	Cleveland Heights, OH
F	33	Leo Edwards	6 ft 8 in (2.03 m)	220 lb (100 kg)	RS Jr	Romulus HS; Santa Fe College	Detroit, MI
F	35	Jimmy Hall	6 ft 8 in (2.03 m)	235 lb (107 kg)	RS Sr	St. Anthony HS; Hofstra	Brooklyn, NY
G	55	Kevin Zabo	6 ft 2 in (1.88 m)	180 lb (82 kg)	Jr	Brewster Academy; Indian Hills CC	Gatineau, QE

Head coach

- Rob Senderoff (Albany)

Assistant coach(es)

- Eric Haut (Kent State)
- Bobby Steinberg (Middle Tennessee)
- Akeem Miskdeen (Queens (NC))

Legend

- (C) Team captain
- (S) Suspended
- (I) Ineligible
- (W) Walk-on
- Injured
- Current redshirt

Roster

== Schedule and results ==
Date time, TV	Rank^{#}	Opponent^{#}	Result	Record	Site (attendance) city, state
Non-conference regular season
11/12/2016*; 5:00 PM		vs. Cleveland State; Northeast Ohio Coaches vs. Cancer	W 79–74 ^{OT}	1–0	Beeghly Center; Youngstown, OH
11/16/2016*; 7:00 PM		Mississippi Valley State	W 93–63	2–0	MAC Center (2,524); Kent, OH
11/18/2016*; 7:00 PM		Hiram; Gulf Coast Showcase	W 111–55	3–0	MAC Center (2,057); Kent, OH
11/21/2016*; 5:00 PM		vs. South Dakota; Gulf Coast Showcase quarterfinals	L 77–80	3–1	Germain Arena; Estero, FL
11/22/2016*; 1:30 PM		vs. George Mason; Gulf Coast Showcase consolation 2nd round	L 76–80	3–2	Germain Arena; Estero, FL
11/23/2016*; 11:00 am		vs. Wofford; Gulf Coast Showcase 7th place game	W 66–59	4–2	Germain Arena; Estero, FL
11/27/2016*; 2:00 PM		Northeastern	L 70–73	4–3	Matthews Arena (701); Boston, MA
12/02/2016*; 7:00 PM		Grambling State	W 86–57	5–3	MAC Center (2,010); Kent, OH
12/07/2016*; 7:00 PM		Niagara	W 100–72	6–3	MAC Center (2,115); Kent, OH
12/10/2016*; 7:00 PM		NJIT	W 87–71	7–3	MAC Center (2,388); Kent, OH
12/18/2016*; 4:00 PM		Wright State	L 63–68	7–4	MAC Center (1,827); Kent, OH
12/21/2016*; 11:00 PM, ESPNU		at Oregon State	L 50–69	7–5	Gill Coliseum (4,020); Corvallis, OR
12/27/2016*; 7:00 PM, ESPNU		at Texas	W 63–58	8–5	Frank Erwin Center (10,658); Austin, TX
MAC regular season
01/03/2017; 7:00 PM		Ball State	W 100–90	9–5 (1–0)	MAC Center (2,153); Kent, OH
01/06/2017; 9:00 PM, ESPNU		at Ohio	L 67–85	9–6 (1–1)	Convocation Center (4,675); Athens, OH
01/10/2017; 7:00 PM		Northern Illinois	L 70–74 ^{OT}	9–7 (1–2)	MAC Center (2,033); Kent, OH
01/14/2017; 2:00 PM		at Western Michigan	L 88–92	9–8 (1–3)	University Arena (2,418); Kalamazoo, MI
01/17/2017; 7:00 PM		Buffalo	L 69–82	9–9 (1–4)	MAC Center (2,110); Kent, OH
01/21/2017; 7:00 PM, Spectrum		Toledo	W 85–61	10–9 (2–4)	MAC Center (6,327); Kent, OH
01/24/2017; 8:00 PM		at Northern Illinois	W 73–66	11–9 (3–4)	Convocation Center (868); DeKalb, IL
01/28/2017; 12:00 PM, CBSSN		Central Michigan	L 98–105 ^{OT}	11–10 (3–5)	MAC Center (3,127); Kent, OH
01/31/2017; 7:00 PM		at Eastern Michigan	W 70–64	12–10 (4–5)	Convocation Center (1,198); Ypsilanti, MI
02/04/2017; 3:30 PM		at Miami	W 66–62	13–10 (5–5)	Millett Hall (1,474); Oxford, OH
02/07/2017; 7:00 PM		Bowling Green	L 83–84 ^{OT}	13–11 (5–6)	MAC Center (2,629); Kent, OH
02/11/2017; 2:00 PM, CBSSN		at Toledo	L 58–78	13–12 (5–7)	Savage Arena (4,829); Toledo, OH
02/14/2017; 7:00 PM		Miami	W 76–72	14–12 (6–7)	MAC Center (2,115); Kent, OH
02/17/2017; 7:00 PM, ESPNU		at Akron	W 70–67	15–12 (7–7)	James A. Rhodes Arena (5,500); Akron, OH
02/21/2017; 7:00 PM		at Buffalo	W 77–69	16–12 (8–7)	Alumni Arena (3,212); Amherst, NY
02/25/2017; 7:00 PM, Spectrum Sports		Ohio	W 70–67	17–12 (9–7)	MAC Center (4,183); Kent, OH
02/28/2017; 7:00 PM		at Bowling Green	W 74–67	18–12 (10–7)	Stroh Center (2,014); Bowling Green, OH
03/03/2017; 9:00 PM, ESPN2		Akron	L 56–66	18–13 (10–8)	MAC Center (6,327); Kent, OH
MAC tournament
March 6, 2017; 7:00 pm	(6)	(11) Central Michigan; First Round	W 116–106 ^{OT}	19–13	MAC Center (2,139); Kent, OH
March 9, 2017; 9:00 pm, Spectrum Sports/ESPN3	(6)	vs. (3) Buffalo; Quarterfinals	W 68–65	20–13	Quicken Loans Arena (3,352); Cleveland, OH
March 10, 2017; 8:00 pm, CBSSN	(6)	vs. (2) Ohio; Semifinals	W 68–66	21–13	Quicken Loans Arena (6,065); Cleveland, OH
March 11, 2017; 7:30 pm, ESPN2	(6)	vs. (1) Akron; Championship	W 70–65	22–13	Quicken Loans Arena (10,376); Cleveland, OH
NCAA tournament
March 17, 2017*; 9:57 pm, truTV	(14 S)	vs. (3 S) No. 8 UCLA; First Round	L 80–97	22–14	Golden 1 Center (16,514); Sacramento, CA
*Non-conference game. ^{#}Rankings from AP Poll. (#) Tournament seedings in parentheses. S=South Region. All times are in Eastern Time Source.

== See also ==
- 2016–17 Kent State Golden Flashes women's basketball team
