= 2016–17 Ohio Bobcats men's basketball team =

American college basketball season

2016–17 Ohio Bobcats men's basketball
- Conference: Mid-American Conference
- East Division
- Record: 20–11 (11–7 MAC)
- Head coach: Saul Phillips (3rd season)
- Assistant coaches: Will Ryan; Jason Kemp; Aaron Fuss
- Home arena: Convocation Center

2016–17 Mid-American Conference men's basketball standings
| | Conf. | | | | Overall |
| Team | W | | L | PCT | W | | L | PCT |
|---|---|---|---|---|---|---|---|---|
East
| Akron | 14 | – | 4 | .778 | 27 | – | 9 | .750 |
| Ohio | 11 | – | 7 | .611 | 20 | – | 11 | .645 |
| Buffalo | 11 | – | 7 | .611 | 17 | – | 15 | .531 |
| Kent State † | 10 | – | 8 | .556 | 22 | – | 14 | .611 |
| Bowling Green | 7 | – | 11 | .389 | 13 | – | 19 | .406 |
| Miami (OH) | 4 | – | 14 | .222 | 11 | – | 21 | .344 |
West
| Ball State | 11 | – | 7 | .611 | 21 | – | 13 | .618 |
| Western Michigan | 11 | – | 7 | .611 | 16 | – | 16 | .500 |
| Toledo | 9 | – | 9 | .500 | 17 | – | 17 | .500 |
| Eastern Michigan | 7 | – | 11 | .389 | 16 | – | 17 | .485 |
| Northern Illinois | 7 | – | 11 | .389 | 15 | – | 17 | .469 |
| Central Michigan | 6 | – | 12 | .333 | 16 | – | 16 | .500 |
† 2017 MAC tournament winner

The 2016–17 Ohio Bobcats men's basketball team represented Ohio University during the 2016–17 NCAA Division I men's basketball season. The Bobcats, led by third-year head coach Saul Phillips, will play its home games at the Convocation Center in Athens, Ohio as a member of the East Division of the Mid-American Conference. They finished the regular season 20–10, 11–7 in MAC play to finish in a tie for second place in the East Division. As the No. 2 seed in the MAC tournament, they defeated Toledo before losing to eventual tournament champion Kent State in the semifinals.

== Previous season ==
The Bobcats finished the 2015–16 season 23–12, 11–7 in MAC play to finish in second place in the East Division. They defeated Northern Illinois in the quarterfinals of the MAC tournament to advance to the semifinals where they lost to Buffalo. They were invited to the College Basketball Invitational where they defeated Albany and UNC Greensboro before losing to Morehead State.

== Offseason ==
=== Departures ===
Departures
| Name | Number | Pos. | Height | Weight | Year | Hometown | Reason |
|---|---|---|---|---|---|---|---|
| Treg Setty | 0 | F | 6'8" | 194 | RS Senior | Maysville, KY | Graduated |

=== 2016 recruiting class ===
College recruiting information
| Name | Hometown | School | Height | Weight | Commit date |
|---|---|---|---|---|---|
| Rodney Culver; G | Delray Beach, FL | Pickerington Central High School | 6 ft 5 in (1.96 m) | 190 lb (86 kg) | Apr 24, 2016 |
| Rodney Culver; G | Recruit ratings: Scout: Rivals: 247Sports: (NR) | | | | |
| Jason Carter; F | Johnstown, OH | Johnstown-Monroe High School | 6 ft 7 in (2.01 m) | 215 lb (98 kg) | Jun 29, 2015 |
| Jason Carter; F | Recruit ratings: Scout: Rivals: 247Sports: (NR) | | | | |
Overall recruit ranking:
Note: In many cases, Scout, Rivals, 247Sports, On3, and ESPN may conflict in their listings of height and weight.; In these cases, the average was taken. ESPN grades are on a 100-point scale.; Sources: "Ohio Basketball Commitment List". Rivals.; "2016 Ohio Basketball Commits". Scout.; "ESPN". ESPN.; "Scout.com Team Recruiting Rankings". Scout.; "2016 Team Ranking". Rivals.

== Roster ==
2016–17 Ohio Bobcats men's basketball team
Players
Coaches

| Pos. | # | Name | Height | Weight | Year | Previous school | Hometown |
|---|---|---|---|---|---|---|---|
| F | 1 | Jason Carter | 6 ft 8 in (2.03 m) | 224 lb (102 kg) | Fr | Johnstown-Monroe High School | Johnstown, Ohio |
| G | 2 | Jaaron Simmons | 6 ft 1 in (1.85 m) | 184 lb (83 kg) | RS Jr | Houston | Dayton, Ohio |
| G | 3 | James Gollon | 6 ft 5 in (1.96 m) | 194 lb (88 kg) | So | Pacelli High School | Stevens Point, Wisconsin |
| F | 4 | Wadly Mompremier | 6 ft 10 in (2.08 m) | 229 lb (104 kg) | Sr | Miami High School | Miami, Florida |
| G | 10 | Antonio Bisutti | 6 ft 2 in (1.88 m) | 188 lb (85 kg) | Jr | Otterbein | Dublin, Ohio |
| G/F | 11 | Khari Harley | 6 ft 9 in (2.06 m) | 189 lb (86 kg) | RS Jr | Egg Harbor Township High School | Egg Harbor Township, New Jersey |
| G | 12 | Drew Crabtree (W) | 6 ft 1 in (1.85 m) | 210 lb (95 kg) | Sr | North Union High School | Marysville, Ohio |
| F | 13 | Kenny Kaminski | 6 ft 8 in (2.03 m) | 228 lb (103 kg) | RS Sr | Michigan State | Medina, Ohio |
| F | 15 | Jaylin McDonald (W) | 6 ft 6 in (1.98 m) | 185 lb (84 kg) | So | Saint Ignatius High School | Streetsboro, Ohio |
| F | 21 | Sam Frayer (W) | 6 ft 7 in (2.01 m) | 240 lb (109 kg) | Jr | Madeira High School | Cincinnati, Ohio |
| G/F | 22 | Gavin Block | 6 ft 7 in (2.01 m) | 209 lb (95 kg) | So | Lincoln Community High School | Lincoln, Illinois |
| G | 23 | Rodney Culver | 6 ft 5 in (1.96 m) | 190 lb (86 kg) | Fr | Elev8 Sports Institute | Columbus, Ohio |
| G | 24 | Mike Laster | 6 ft 5 in (1.96 m) | 199 lb (90 kg) | Jr | Cass Technical High School | Detroit, Michigan |
| F | 25 | Ellis Dozier | 6 ft 8 in (2.03 m) | 218 lb (99 kg) | RS Fr | Fishburne Military School | Sandy Spring, Maryland |
| F | 33 | Antonio Campbell | 6 ft 9 in (2.06 m) | 251 lb (114 kg) | Sr | Holy Cross High School | Cincinnati, Ohio |
| G | 35 | Jordan Dartis | 6 ft 3 in (1.91 m) | 195 lb (88 kg) | So | Newark High School | Newark, Ohio |
| F | 45 | Doug Taylor | 6 ft 9 in (2.06 m) | 258 lb (117 kg) | So | Northland High School | Columbus, Ohio |

Head coach

- Saul Phillips (UW–Platteville)

Assistant coach(es)

- Will Ryan (Wisconsin)
- Jason Kemp (UW–La Crosse)
- Aaron Fuss (Ohio State)

Legend

- (C) Team captain
- (S) Suspended
- (I) Ineligible
- (W) Walk-on
- Injured
- Current redshirt

Roster

== Preseason ==
The preseason poll and league awards were announced by the league office on October 28, 2016. Ohio was picked second in the MAC East.

=== Preseason men's basketball poll ===
(First place votes in parentheses)

==== East Division ====
1. Akron 194 (15)
2. Ohio 190 (16)
3. Buffalo 144 (5)
4. Kent State 116
5. Bowling Green 63
6. Miami 49

==== West Division ====
1. Eastern Michigan 178 (16)
2. Ball State 158 (12)
3. Northern Illinois 148 (5)
4. Toledo 100 (1)
5. Western Michigan 95
6. Central Michigan 77 (2)

==== Tournament champs ====
Akron (15), Ohio (11), Eastern Michigan (3), Buffalo (2), NIU (2), Central Michigan (1), Kent State (1), Miami (1).

=== Preseason All-MAC ===
Preseason All-MAC teams
| Team | Player | Position | Year |
|---|---|---|---|
| Preseason All-MAC East | Antonio Campbell | F | Sr. |

== Schedule and results ==
| Date time, TV | Rank^{#} | Opponent^{#} | Result | Record | Site (attendance) city, state |
Exhibition
| November 5, 2016*; 2:00 pm | | Rio Grande | W 87–56 | | Convocation Center (9,138); Athens, Ohio |
Non-conference regular season
| November 12, 2016*; 2:00 pm | | Southern | W 77–67 | 1–0 | Convocation Center (6,268); Athens, Ohio |
| November 14, 2016*; 7:00 pm, ESPN3 | | Sam Houston State | W 96–75 | 2–0 | Convocation Center (6,669); Athens, Ohio |
| November 18, 2016*; 8:00 pm, ACCN Extra | | at Georgia Tech | W 67–61 | 3–0 | Hank McCamish Pavilion (4,802); Atlanta, Georgia |
| November 25, 2016*; 7:00 pm | | Tennessee Tech | W 68–57 | 4–0 | Convocation Center (6,388); Athens, Ohio |
| November 30, 2016*; 7:00 pm | | at Marshall | L 88–98 | 4–1 | Cam Henderson Center (6,013); Huntington, West Virginia |
| December 3, 2016*; 3:30 pm, ESPN3 | | Bryant | W 79–53 | 5–1 | Convocation Center (6,895); Athens, Ohio |
| December 10, 2016*; 2:00 pm, ESPN3 | | at Iona | L 75–79 | 5–2 | Hynes Athletic Center (1,751); New Rochelle, New York |
| December 14, 2016*; 7:00 pm, BCSN | | Milwaukee | W 71–69 | 6–2 | Convocation Center (4,279); Athens, Ohio |
| December 17, 2016*; 2:00 pm | | Cleveland State | W 71–53 | 7–2 | Convocation Center (4,463); Athens, Ohio |
| December 21, 2016*; 9:00 pm, FCS | | at WKU | L 66–67 | 7–3 | E. A. Diddle Arena (2,746); Bowling Green, KY |
| December 30, 2016*; 7:00 pm | | Urbana | W 77–50 | 8–3 | Convocation Center (4,391); Athens, Ohio |
MAC regular season
| January 3, 2017; 7:00 pm, ESPN3 | | Western Michigan | W 89–58 | 9–3 (1–0) | Convocation Center (4,616); Athens, Ohio |
| January 6, 2017; 9:00 pm, ESPNU | | Kent State | W 85–67 | 10–3 (2–0) | Convocation Center (4,675); Athens, Ohio |
| January 10, 2017; 7:00 pm, BCSN | | at Buffalo | W 74–72 | 11–3 (3–0) | Alumni Arena (2,652); Amherst, NY |
| January 14, 2017; 3:30 pm, ESPN3 | | Eastern Michigan | L 49–53 | 11–4 (3–1) | Convocation Center; Athens, Ohio |
| January 17, 2017; 7:00 pm, ASN/ESPN3 | | at Akron | L 68–83 | 11–5 (3–2) | James A. Rhodes Arena (3,598); Akron, OH |
| January 21, 2017; 4:30 pm | | at Northern Illinois | W 78–69 | 12–5 (4–2) | Convocation Center (2,167); DeKalb, IL |
| January 24, 2017; 7:00 pm, BCSN | | Toledo | L 76–79 | 12–6 (4–3) | Convocation Center (5,166); Athens, Ohio |
| January 28, 2017; 12:00 pm | | at Bowling Green | W 96–72 | 13–6 (5–3) | Stroh Center (2,372); DeKalb, IL |
| January 31, 2017; 6:00 pm, ASN | | at Western Michigan | L 85–90 | 13–7 (5–4) | University Arena (1,806); Kalamazoo, Michigan |
| February 4, 2017; 3:30 pm, ESPN3 | | Akron | W 85–70 | 14–7 (6–4) | Convocation Center (10,101); Athens, Ohio |
| February 7, 2017; 7:00 pm, ESPN3 | | Central Michigan | L 87–97 | 14–8 (6–5) | Convocation Center (7,063); Athens, Ohio |
| February 10, 2017; 6:30 pm, CBSSN | | at Ball State | W 79–77 | 15–8 (7–5) | Worthen Arena (3,123); Muncie, IN |
| February 14, 2017; 7:00 pm, ESPN3 | | at Eastern Michigan | W 79–71 | 16–8 (8–5) | Convocation Center (858); Ypsilanti, Michigan |
| February 18, 2017; 2:00 pm, ESPN3 | | Bowling Green | W 95–75 | 17–8 (9–5) | Convocation Center (8,150); Athens, Ohio |
| February 21, 2017; 7:00 pm, ASN | | at Miami (OH) | W 79–62 | 18–8 (10–5) | Millett Hall (1,639); Oxford, OH |
| February 25, 2017; 7:00 pm, ESPN3 | | at Kent State | L 67–70 | 18–9 (10–6) | MAC Center (4,183); Kent, Ohio |
| February 28, 2017; 7:00 pm, ESPN3 | | Buffalo | L 79–83 | 18–10 (10–7) | Convocation Center (5,672); Athens, Ohio |
| March 3, 2017; 7:00 pm, ESPN3 | | Miami (OH) | W 69–55 | 19–10 (11–7) | Convocation Center (9,633); Athens, Ohio |
MAC tournament
| March 9, 2017; 6:30 pm, BCSN/ESPN3 | (2) | vs. (7) Toledo; Quarterfinals | W 67–66 | 20–10 | Quicken Loans Arena; Cleveland, OH |
| March 10, 2017; 8:05 pm, CBSSN | (2) | vs. (6) Kent State; Semifinals | L 66–68 | 20–11 | Quicken Loans Arena (6,065); Cleveland, OH |
*Non-conference game. ^{#}Rankings from AP Poll. (#) Tournament seedings in parentheses. All times are in Eastern Time Source,.

== Statistics ==
=== Team statistics ===
Final 2016–17 statistics

| Record | Ohio | OPP |
|---|---|---|
| Scoring | 2387 | 2166 |
| Scoring Average | 77.00 | 69.87 |
| Field goals – Att | 835–1837 | 768–1853 |
| 3-pt. Field goals – Att | 285–742 | 218–675 |
| Free throws – Att | 432–626 | 412–602 |
| Rebounds | 1141 | 1149 |
| Assists | 415 | 337 |
| Turnovers | 388 | 417 |
| Steals | 182 | 182 |
| Blocked Shots | 88 | 86 |

=== Player statistics ===
| | | | Minutes | | Scoring | | Total FGs | | | 3-point FGs | | | Free-Throws | | | Rebounds | | | | | | | | |
| Player | GP | GS | Tot | Avg | Pts | Avg | FG | FGA | Pct | 3FG | 3FA | Pct | FT | FTA | Pct | Off | Def | Tot | Avg | A | PF | TO | Stl | Blk |
|---|---|---|---|---|---|---|---|---|---|---|---|---|---|---|---|---|---|---|---|---|---|---|---|---|
| Jaaron Simmons | 31 | 31 | 1116 | 36 | 492 | 15.9 | 176 | 406 | 0.433 | 37 | 107 | 0.346 | 103 | 142 | 0.725 | 14 | 96 | 110 | 3.5 | 200 | 72 | 123 | 29 | 2 |
| Jordan Dartis | 31 | 31 | 1082 | 34.9 | 390 | 12.6 | 118 | 268 | 0.44 | 86 | 195 | 0.441 | 68 | 77 | 0.883 | 4 | 109 | 113 | 3.6 | 56 | 54 | 31 | 39 | 6 |
| Kenny Kaminski | 30 | 30 | 850 | 28.3 | 354 | 11.8 | 119 | 300 | 0.397 | 81 | 190 | 0.426 | 35 | 45 | 0.778 | 19 | 72 | 91 | 3 | 27 | 76 | 30 | 25 | 6 |
| Jason Carter | 31 | 15 | 642 | 20.7 | 306 | 9.9 | 115 | 226 | 0.509 | 9 | 44 | 0.205 | 67 | 98 | 0.684 | 61 | 141 | 202 | 6.5 | 18 | 70 | 37 | 20 | 19 |
| Gavin Block | 31 | 31 | 870 | 28.1 | 236 | 7.6 | 77 | 180 | 0.428 | 27 | 78 | 0.346 | 55 | 84 | 0.655 | 23 | 110 | 133 | 4.3 | 64 | 63 | 47 | 31 | 6 |
| Antonio Campbell | 15 | 14 | 334 | 22.3 | 229 | 15.3 | 88 | 166 | 0.53 | 23 | 64 | 0.359 | 30 | 46 | 0.652 | 25 | 100 | 125 | 8.3 | 11 | 49 | 26 | 9 | 16 |
| Mike Laster | 30 | 0 | 455 | 15.2 | 157 | 5.2 | 61 | 115 | 0.53 | 15 | 34 | 0.441 | 20 | 32 | 0.625 | 25 | 31 | 56 | 1.9 | 12 | 40 | 23 | 9 | 2 |
| Doug Taylor | 31 | 2 | 417 | 13.5 | 116 | 3.7 | 43 | 82 | 0.524 | 0 | 1 | 0 | 30 | 57 | 0.526 | 48 | 99 | 147 | 4.7 | 7 | 72 | 22 | 10 | 24 |
| Rodney Culver | 31 | 1 | 316 | 10.2 | 82 | 2.6 | 30 | 67 | 0.448 | 5 | 14 | 0.357 | 17 | 31 | 0.548 | 10 | 35 | 45 | 1.5 | 17 | 37 | 35 | 9 | 6 |
| Ellis Dozier | 12 | 0 | 29 | 2.4 | 7 | 0.6 | 3 | 9 | 0.333 | 0 | 2 | 0 | 1 | 4 | 0.25 | 1 | 1 | 2 | 0.2 | 0 | 4 | 4 | 0 | 1 |
| Antonio Bisutti | 12 | 0 | 18 | 1.5 | 5 | 0.4 | 2 | 2 | 1 | 1 | 1 | 1 | 0 | 0 | 0 | 2 | 8 | 10 | 0.8 | 1 | 2 | 2 | 1 | 0 |
| Khari Harley | 1 | 0 | 10 | 10 | 5 | 5 | 1 | 1 | 1 | 0 | 0 | 0 | 3 | 4 | 0.75 | 0 | 0 | 0 | 0 | 0 | 4 | 2 | 0 | 0 |
| Jaylin McDonald | 12 | 0 | 19 | 1.6 | 4 | 0.3 | 1 | 6 | 0.167 | 0 | 4 | 0 | 2 | 2 | 1 | 0 | 1 | 1 | 0.1 | 0 | 1 | 0 | 0 | 0 |
| Drew Crabtree | 13 | 0 | 24 | 1.8 | 3 | 0.2 | 1 | 6 | 0.167 | 1 | 5 | 0.2 | 0 | 0 | 0 | 0 | 4 | 4 | 0.3 | 2 | 4 | 1 | 0 | 0 |
| Sam Frayer | 12 | 0 | 19 | 1.6 | 1 | 0.1 | 0 | 4 | 0 | 0 | 3 | 0 | 1 | 4 | 0.25 | 2 | 6 | 8 | 0.7 | 1 | 2 | 2 | 0 | 0 |
| Total | 31 | - | 6200 | - | 2387 | 77.0 | 835 | 1837 | 0.455 | 285 | 742 | 0.384 | 432 | 626 | 0.690 | 284 | 857 | 1141 | 36.8 | 415 | 550 | 388 | 182 | 88 |
| Opponents | 31 | - | 6200 | - | 2166 | 69.9 | 768 | 1853 | 0.414 | 218 | 675 | 0.323 | 412 | 602 | 0.684 | 326 | 823 | 1149 | 37.1 | 337 | 611 | 417 | 182 | 86 |

Legend
| GP | Games played | GS | Games started | Avg | Average per game |
| FG | Field-goals made | FGA | Field-goal attempts | Off | Offensive rebounds |
| Def | Defensive rebounds | A | Assists | TO | Turnovers |
| Blk | Blocks | Stl | Steals | High | Team high |

== Awards and honors ==
=== All-MAC Awards ===
Postseason All-MAC teams
| Team | Player | Position | Year |
|---|---|---|---|
| All-MAC First Team | Jaaron Simmons | G | Jr. |
| All-MAC Honorable Mention | Jordan Dartis | G | So. |
| All-MAC Freshman Team | Jason Carter | F | Fr. |

== Rankings ==
Ranking movement Legend: ██ Increase in ranking. ██ Decrease in ranking. RV=Received votes.
| Poll | Pre | Wk 2 | Wk 3 | Wk 4 | Wk 5 | Wk 6 | Wk 7 | Wk 8 | Wk 9 | Wk 10 | Wk 11 | Wk 12 | Wk 13 | Wk 14 | Wk 15 | Wk 16 | Wk 17 | Wk 18 | Post | Final |
|---|---|---|---|---|---|---|---|---|---|---|---|---|---|---|---|---|---|---|---|---|
| AP | RV | RV | RV | NR | NR | NR | NR | NR | NR | NR | NR | NR | NR | NR | NR | NR | NR | NR | | N/A* |
| Coaches | NR | NR | NR | NR | NR | NR | NR | NR | NR | NR | NR | NR | NR | NR | NR | NR | NR | NR | | |

== See also ==
- 2016–17 Ohio Bobcats women's basketball team
