= 2016–17 Toledo Rockets men's basketball team =

American college basketball season

2016–17 Toledo Rockets men's basketball

CBI, First round
- Conference: Mid-American Conference
- West Division
- Record: 17–17 (9–9 MAC)
- Head coach: Tod Kowalczyk (7th season)
- Assistant coaches: Jason Kaslow; Jeff Massey; DeAndre Haynes
- Home arena: Savage Arena

2016–17 Mid-American Conference men's basketball standings
	Conf.				Overall
Team	W		L	PCT	W		L	PCT
East
Akron	14	–	4	.778	27	–	9	.750
Ohio	11	–	7	.611	20	–	11	.645
Buffalo	11	–	7	.611	17	–	15	.531
Kent State †	10	–	8	.556	22	–	14	.611
Bowling Green	7	–	11	.389	13	–	19	.406
Miami (OH)	4	–	14	.222	11	–	21	.344
West
Ball State	11	–	7	.611	21	–	13	.618
Western Michigan	11	–	7	.611	16	–	16	.500
Toledo	9	–	9	.500	17	–	17	.500
Eastern Michigan	7	–	11	.389	16	–	17	.485
Northern Illinois	7	–	11	.389	15	–	17	.469
Central Michigan	6	–	12	.333	16	–	16	.500
† 2017 MAC tournament winner

The 2016–17 Toledo Rockets men's basketball team represented the University of Toledo during the 2016–17 NCAA Division I men's basketball season. The Rockets, led by seventh-year head coach Tod Kowalczyk, played their home games at Savage Arena, as members of the West Division of the Mid-American Conference. They finished the season 17–17, 9–9 in MAC play to finish in third place in the West Division. As the No. 7 seed in the MAC tournament. they defeated Bowling Green in the first round to advance to the quarterfinals, where they lost to Ohio. They received an invitation to the College Basketball Invitational, where they lost in the first round to George Washington.

== Previous season ==
The Rockets finished the 2015–16 season 17–15, 8–10 in MAC play to finish in fifth place in the West Division. They lost in the first round of the MAC tournament to Eastern Michigan.

== Departures ==
Name	Number	Pos.	Height	Weight	Year	Hometown	Reason for departure
Stuckey Mosley	3	G	6'3"	180	Sophomore	Orlando, FL	Transferred to James Madison
Chandler White	5	G	6'2"	195	Freshman	Fort Wayne, IN	Transferred to St. Francis
Nick Rogers	10	G	6'1"	170	Freshman	Indianapolis, IN	Transferred to IUPUI
Nathan Boothe	53	C	6'9"	250	Senior	Gurnee, IL	Graduated

=== Incoming transfers ===
Name	Number	Pos.	Height	Weight	Year	Hometown	Previous school
Lucas Antunez	3	G	6'3"		Junior	Madrid, Spain	Junior college transferred from North Idaho College
Daniel Dzierzawski	10	G	6'1"		Junior	Hamilton, ON	Junior college transferred from Moberly Area CC
Tre'Shaun Fletcher		G/F	6'7"	205	Senior	Tacoma, WA	Transferred from Colorado. Under NCAA transfer rules, Fletcher had to sit out for the 2016–17 season. Had one year of remaining eligibility.

== Recruiting class of 2016 ==
College recruiting
Name	Hometown	School	Height	Weight	Commit date
Justin Roberts; PG	Lawrence, KS	Lawrence High School	5 ft 10 in (1.78 m)	170 lb (77 kg)	Feb 20, 2016
Justin Roberts; PG	Recruit ratings: Scout: Rivals: (NR)				
James Gordon IV; SF	Chicago, IL	Simeon Career Academy	6 ft 5 in (1.96 m)	215 lb (98 kg)	Feb 20, 2016
James Gordon IV; SF	Recruit ratings: Scout: Rivals: (NR)				
Overall recruit ranking:
Note: In many cases, Scout, Rivals, 247Sports, On3, and ESPN may conflict in their listings of height and weight.; In these cases, the average was taken. ESPN grades are on a 100-point scale.; Sources: "2016 Team Ranking". Rivals.

=== Recruiting class of 2017 ===
College recruiting (2017)
Name	Hometown	School	Height	Weight	Commit date
Logan Hill; PF	Massillon, OH	Jackson High School	6 ft 7 in (2.01 m)	205 lb (93 kg)	Jun 25, 2016
Logan Hill; PF	Recruit ratings: Scout: Rivals: (NR)				
Marreon Jackson; PG	Cleveland, OH	Garfield Heights High School	6 ft 0 in (1.83 m)	160 lb (73 kg)	Feb 15, 2016
Marreon Jackson; PG	Recruit ratings: Scout: Rivals: (NR)				
Overall recruit ranking:
Note: In many cases, Scout, Rivals, 247Sports, On3, and ESPN may conflict in their listings of height and weight.; In these cases, the average was taken. ESPN grades are on a 100-point scale.; Sources: "2017 Team Ranking". Rivals.

== Roster ==
2016–17 Toledo Rockets men's basketball team
Players
Coaches

Pos.	#	Name	Height	Weight	Year	Previous school	Hometown
F	0	James Gordon IV	6 ft 5 in (1.96 m)	215 lb (98 kg)	Fr	Siemon Career	Shelbyville, KY
G	1	Jonathan Williams	6 ft 3 in (1.91 m)	200 lb (91 kg)	Sr	Southfield-Lathrup	Southfield, MI
F	2	Taylor Adway	6 ft 9 in (2.06 m)	215 lb (98 kg)	So	Hillcrest	Hazel Crest, IL
G	3	Lucas Autunez	6 ft 3 in (1.91 m)	175 lb (79 kg)	Jr	Findlay Prep; North Idaho College	Madrid, Spain
F	4	Fred John, Jr. (W)	6 ft 5 in (1.96 m)	210 lb (95 kg)	So	Southfield	Southfield, MI
G	5	Justin Roberts	5 ft 10 in (1.78 m)	170 lb (77 kg)	Fr	Lawrence	Lawrence, KS
G	10	Daniel Dzierzawski	6 ft 0 in (1.83 m)	165 lb (75 kg)	Jr	Cathedral Secondary; Moberly Area CC	Hamilton, ON
G	13	Jaelan Sanford	6 ft 4 in (1.93 m)	195 lb (88 kg)	Fr	Reitz	Evansville, IN
F	23	Steve Taylor, Jr.	6 ft 9 in (2.06 m)	240 lb (109 kg)	RS Sr	Siemon Career; Marquette	Chicago, IL
G	25	Jordan Lauf	6 ft 5 in (1.96 m)	200 lb (91 kg)	Sr	Napoleon HS	Napoleon, OH
F/C	30	Luke Knapke	6 ft 11 in (2.11 m)	235 lb (107 kg)	RS Fr	Marion Local HS	Minster, OH
C	33	Zach Garber	6 ft 10 in (2.08 m)	245 lb (111 kg)	Sr	Vanlue	Carey, OH
F	35	Nate Navigato	6 ft 8 in (2.03 m)	215 lb (98 kg)	So	Geneva	Geneva, IL
G/F		Tre'Shaun Fletcher (I) (redshirt)	6 ft 7 in (2.01 m)	205 lb (93 kg)	Sr	Lincoln; Colorado	Tacoma, WA

Head coach

- Tod Kowalczyk (Minnesota Duluth)

Assistant coach(es)

- Jason Kaslow (Wisconsin–Stevens Point)
- Jeff Massey (Xavier)
- DeAndre Haynes (Kent State)

Legend

- (C) Team captain
- (S) Suspended
- (I) Ineligible
- (W) Walk-on
- Injured
- Current redshirt

Roster

== Schedule and results ==
Date time, TV	Rank^{#}	Opponent^{#}	Result	Record	Site (attendance) city, state
Exhibition
11/05/2016; 2:30 PM, ESPN3		Ohio Dominican	W 94–79		Savage Arena; Toledo, OH
Non-conference regular season
11/11/2016*; 7:00 PM		at Saint Joseph's	L 76–77	0–1	Hagan Arena (4,200); Philadelphia, PA
11/15/2016*; 8:00 PM, ESPN3		Youngstown State	W 103–98	1–1	Savage Arena (3,891); Toledo, OH
11/19/2016*; 7:00 PM, ESPN3		at Wright State	W 82–78	2–1	Nutter Center (3,938); Dayton, OH
11/22/2016*; 6:30 PM		at Middle Tennessee	L 60–70	2–2	Murphy Center (3,984); Murfreesboro, TN
11/25/2016*; 6:00 PM		vs. Evansville; Challenge in Music City	W 83–79 ^{2OT}	3–2	Nashville Municipal Auditorium; Nashville, TN
11/26/2016*; 8:30 PM		vs. Middle Tennessee; Challenge in Music City	L 70–73 ^{OT}	3–3	Nashville Municipal Auditorium; Nashville, TN
11/27/2016*; 4:00 PM		vs. UNC Wilmington; Challenge in Music City	L 77–102	3–4	Nashville Municipal Auditorium; Nashville, TN
12/03/2016*; 7:00 PM, ESPN3		Green Bay	L 77–78	3–5	Savage Arena (4,291); Toledo, OH
12/07/2016*; 7:00 PM, ESPN3		Detroit	W 73–65	4–5	Savage Arena (4,028); Toledo, OH
12/10/2016*; 7:00 PM		at Marshall	L 105–111 ^{OT}	4–6	Cam Henderson Center (5,696); Huntington, WV
12/17/2016*; 7:00 PM, ESPN3		Southeastern Louisiana	W 78–56	5–6	Savage Arena (3,474); Toledo, OH
12/20/2016*; 7:00 PM, ESPN3		Loyola–Chicago	W 74–70	6–6	Savage Arena (3,452); Toledo, OH
12/30/2016*; 7:00 PM, ESPN3		Ohio Christian	W 98–58	7–6	Savage Arena (3,610); Toledo, OH
MAC regular season
01/03/2017; 6:00 PM, ASN		Buffalo	W 86–54	8–6 (1–0)	Savage Arena (3,688); Toledo, OH
01/07/2017; 4:00 PM, BCSN		Miami (OH)	W 91–76	9–6 (2–0)	Savage Arena (4,471); Toledo, OH
01/10/2017; 7:00 PM, ESPN3		at Western Michigan	L 74–90	9–7 (2–1)	University Arena (1,879); Kalamazoo, MI
01/13/2017; 7:00 PM, CBSSN		at Central Michigan	L 88–96	9–8 (2–2)	McGuirk Arena (2,684); Mount Pleasant, MI
01/17/2017; 7:00 PM, BCSN		Bowling Green	W 85–73	10–8 (3–2)	Savage Arena (5,118); Toledo, OH
01/21/2017; 7:00 PM, Spectrum		at Kent State	L 61–85	10–9 (3–3)	MAC Center (6,327); Kent, OH
01/24/2017; 7:00 PM, BCSN		at Ohio	W 79–76	11–9 (4–3)	Convocation Center (5,166); Athens, OH
01/28/2017; 7:00 PM, ESPN3		Northern Illinois	L 72–74	11–10 (4–4)	Savage Arena (4,864); Toledo, OH
01/31/2017; 7:00 PM, ESPN3		at Ball State	L 80–81	11–11 (4–5)	Worthen Arena (3,058); Muncie, IN
02/04/2017; 12:00 PM, BCSN, ESPN3		at Bowling Green	L 100–104 ^{2OT}	11–12 (4–6)	Stroh Center (2,676); Bowling Green, OH
02/07/2017; 7:00 PM, BCSN		Eastern Michigan	W 73–57	12–12 (5–6)	Savage Arena (4,222); Toledo, OH
02/11/2017; 2:00 PM, CBSSN		Kent State	W 78–58	13–12 (6–6)	Savage Arena (4,829); Toledo, OH
02/14/2017; 7:00 PM, BCSN		at Akron	L 65–71	13–13 (6–7)	James A. Rhodes Arena (3,365); Akron, OH
02/18/2017; 3:30 PM, ESPN3		at Northern Illinois	W 88–80 ^{OT}	14–13 (7–7)	Convocation Center (2,007); DeKalb, IL
02/21/2017; 7:00 PM, ESPN3		Western Michigan	L 56–61 ^{OT}	14–14 (7–8)	Savage Arena (3,859); Toledo, OH
02/25/2017; 7:00 PM, ESPN3		Central Michigan	W 82–74	15–14 (8–8)	Savage Arena (4,463); Toledo, OH
02/28/2017; 7:00 PM, ESPN3		Ball State	L 74–82	15–15 (8–9)	Savage Arena (3,958); Toledo, OH
03/03/2017; 7:00 PM, ESPN3		at Eastern Michigan	W 60–56	16–15 (9–9)	Convocation Center (3,078); Ypsilanti, MI
MAC tournament
03/06/2017; 8:00 pm, ESPN3	(7)	(10) Bowling Green; First round	W 77–62	17–15	Savage Arena (4,085); Toledo, OH
03/09/2017; 6:30 pm, BCSN/ESPN3	(7)	vs. (2) Ohio; Quarterfinals	L 66–67	17–16	Quicken Loans Arena (3,352); Cleveland, OH
College Basketball Invitational
03/15/2017*; 7:00 pm, Facebook Live		at George Washington; First round	L 69–73	17–17	Charles E. Smith Center (1,016); Washington, D.C.
*Non-conference game. ^{#}Rankings from AP Poll. (#) Tournament seedings in parentheses. All times are in Eastern Time Source.

== See also ==
- 2016–17 Toledo Rockets women's basketball team
