= 2016–17 Miami RedHawks men's basketball team =

American college basketball season

2016–17 Miami RedHawks men's basketball
- Conference: Mid-American Conference
- East Division
- Record: 11–21 (4–14 MAC)
- Head coach: John Cooper (5th season)
- Assistant coaches: Rick Duckett; Sheldon Everett; Trey Meyer
- Home arena: Millett Hall

2016–17 Mid-American Conference men's basketball standings
	Conf.				Overall
Team	W		L	PCT	W		L	PCT
East
Akron	14	–	4	.778	27	–	9	.750
Ohio	11	–	7	.611	20	–	11	.645
Buffalo	11	–	7	.611	17	–	15	.531
Kent State †	10	–	8	.556	22	–	14	.611
Bowling Green	7	–	11	.389	13	–	19	.406
Miami (OH)	4	–	14	.222	11	–	21	.344
West
Ball State	11	–	7	.611	21	–	13	.618
Western Michigan	11	–	7	.611	16	–	16	.500
Toledo	9	–	9	.500	17	–	17	.500
Eastern Michigan	7	–	11	.389	16	–	17	.485
Northern Illinois	7	–	11	.389	15	–	17	.469
Central Michigan	6	–	12	.333	16	–	16	.500
† 2017 MAC tournament winner

The 2016–17 Miami RedHawks men's basketball team represented Miami University during the 2016–17 NCAA Division I men's basketball season. The RedHawks, led by fifth-year head coach John Cooper, played their home games at Millett Hall, as members of the East Division of the Mid-American Conference. They finished the season 11–21, 4–14 in MAC play to finish in last place. As the No. 12 seed in the MAC tournament, they lost in the first round to Western Michigan.

Head coach John Cooper was fired on March 10, 2017 after five seasons at Miami. Purdue associate head coach Jack Owens was named the new head coach on March 29.

== Previous season ==
The RedHawks finished the 2015–16 season 13–20, 6–12 in MAC play to finish in fifth place in the East Division. They defeated Ball State in the first round of the MAC tournament to advance to the quarterfinals where they lost to Buffalo.

== Offseason ==
=== Departures ===
Name	Number	Pos.	Height	Weight	Year	Hometown	Notes
Geovonie McKnight	0	G	6'3"	181	Senior	Middletown, OH	Graduated
L. J. Livingston, Jr.	12	F/C	6'10"	200	Senior	Upper Marlboro, MD	Graduated
Jere Vučica	14	F	6'9"	204	RS Senior	Split, Croatia	Graduated
Ali Barnes	15	G	6'0"	183	RS Sophomore	West Chester, OH	Walk-on; left the team for personal reasons
Kalif Wright	21	F	6'7"	235	Senior	Oak Hill, WV	Graduated
Willie Moore	22	G	6'3"	205	Senior	Cincinnati, OH	Graduated
Chris Bryant	24	F	6'8"	217	Senior	Tallahassee, FL	Graduated
Eric Washington	33	G	5'10"	178	RS Senior	Columbia, SC	Graduated
Brian Oddo	35	F	6'6"	205	Senior	New Lenox, IL	Graduated

=== Recruiting class of 2016 ===
College recruiting information
Name	Hometown	School	Height	Weight	Commit date
Derrick Daniels; PF	Dayton, OH	Thurgood Marshall High School	6 ft 6 in (1.98 m)	195 lb (88 kg)	Oct 16, 2015
Derrick Daniels; PF	Recruit ratings: Scout: Rivals: (NR)				
Darius Harper; PF	Springfield, OH	Springfield High School	6 ft 9 in (2.06 m)	250 lb (110 kg)	Sep 25, 2015
Darius Harper; PF	Recruit ratings: Scout: Rivals: (NR)				
Precious Ayah; PF	Decatur, GA	Greenforest Christian Academy	6 ft 7 in (2.01 m)	210 lb (95 kg)	Oct 9, 2015
Precious Ayah; PF	Recruit ratings: Scout: Rivals: (NR)				
Michael Weathers; SG	Shawnee Mission, KS	Shawnee Mission North High School	6 ft 3 in (1.91 m)	N/A	Mar 20, 2016
Michael Weathers; SG	Recruit ratings: Scout: Rivals: (NR)				
Marcus Weathers; SG	Shawnee Mission, KS	Shawnee Mission North High School	6 ft 3 in (1.91 m)	N/A	Mar 20, 2016
Marcus Weathers; SG	Recruit ratings: Scout: Rivals: (NR)				
Ben Eke Kazee; PF	Logan, WV	Logan High School	6 ft 8 in (2.03 m)	N/A	Jul 28, 2016
Ben Eke Kazee; PF	Recruit ratings: Scout: Rivals: (NR)				
Milos Jovic; SG	Prague, Czech Republic	Get Better Academy	6 ft 4 in (1.93 m)	N/A	
Milos Jovic; SG	Recruit ratings: Scout: Rivals: (NR)				
Overall recruit ranking:
Note: In many cases, Scout, Rivals, 247Sports, On3, and ESPN may conflict in their listings of height and weight.; In these cases, the average was taken. ESPN grades are on a 100-point scale.; Sources: "2016 Team Ranking". Rivals.

== Roster ==
2016–17 Miami RedHawks men's basketball team
Players
Coaches

Pos.	#	Name	Height	Weight	Year	Previous school	Hometown
C	0	Darius Harper	6 ft 8 in (2.03 m)	295 lb (134 kg)	Fr	Springfield	Springfield, OH
G	1	Zach McCormick	6 ft 2 in (1.88 m)	190 lb (86 kg)	Jr	Turpin	Cincinnati, OH
F	2	Rod Mills Jr.	6 ft 7 in (2.01 m)	220 lb (100 kg)	Jr	St. Xavier	Cincinnati, OH
F	5	Precious Ayah	6 ft 6 in (1.98 m)	207 lb (94 kg)	Fr	Greenforest	Bayelsa State, Nigeria
F	11	Logan McLane	6 ft 9 in (2.06 m)	239 lb (108 kg)	Jr	Greenfield School, NC	Winterville, NC
G/F	13	Jake Wright	6 ft 4 in (1.93 m)	203 lb (92 kg)	RS So	Hopkins; The Citadel	Hopkins, MN
G	15	Milos Jovic	6 ft 4 in (1.93 m)	180 lb (82 kg)	Fr	GB Academy	Leskovac, Serbia
G	20	Dion Wade	6 ft 6 in (1.98 m)	185 lb (84 kg)	RS Jr	Findlay Prep; Auburn	Antwerp, Belgium
G	21	Jake Bischoff (W)	6 ft 3 in (1.91 m)	195 lb (88 kg)	RS Sr	Olentangy Liberty; Concord/Otterbein	Powell, OH
F	22	Marcus Weathers	6 ft 5 in (1.96 m)	195 lb (88 kg)	Fr	Shawnee Mission North	Roeland, KS
G	24	Michael Weathers	6 ft 2 in (1.88 m)	161 lb (73 kg)	Fr	Shawnee Mission North	Roeland, KS
G	30	Abdoulaye Harouna	6 ft 5 in (1.96 m)	178 lb (81 kg)	Jr	South Kent; College of Southern Idaho	Niamey, Niger
F/C	31	Bruno Solomun	6 ft 9 in (2.06 m)	215 lb (98 kg)	Fr	Forsyth Country Day	Zagreb, Croatia
F	45	Ben Eke Kazee	6 ft 8 in (2.03 m)	216 lb (98 kg)	Fr	Logan	Delta State, Nigeria

Head coach

- John Cooper (Wichita State)

Assistant coach(es)

- Rick Duckett (North Carolina)
- Sheldon Everett (South Carolina)
- Trey Meyer (Clemson)

Legend

- (C) Team captain
- (S) Suspended
- (I) Ineligible
- (W) Walk-on
- Injured
- Current redshirt

Roster

== Schedule and results ==
Date time, TV	Rank^{#}	Opponent^{#}	Result	Record	Site (attendance) city, state
Non-conference regular season
11/11/2016*; 1:00 PM, ESPN3		Muskingum; Tarkett Sports Classic play-in game	W 84–57	1–0	Millett Hall; Oxford, OH
11/15/2016*; 7:00 PM		at Wright State	L 87–89	1–1	Nutter Center (3,813); Dayton, OH
11/18/2016*; 7:00 PM, ESPN3		Delaware; Tarkett Sports Classic	L 66–68	1–2	Millett Hall (1,317); Oxford, OH
11/19/2016*; 3:30 PM, ESPN3		Austin Peay; Tarkett Sports Classic	W 76–70	2–2	Millett Hall (1,274); Oxford, OH
11/20/2016*; 2:00 PM, ESPN3		Northern Kentucky; Tarkett Sports Classic	L 70–79	2–3	Millett Hall (1,229); Oxford, OH
11/26/2016*; 3:30 PM, ESPN3		Western Illinois	W 81–72	3–3	Millett Hall (1,083); Oxford, OH
11/30/2016*; 7:00 PM, ESPN3		Grambling State	W 78–76	4–3	Millett Hall (1,205); Oxford, OH
12/03/2016*; 2:30 PM		at Fort Wayne	L 71–87	4–4	Memorial Coliseum (1,539); Fort Wayne, IN
12/06/2016*; 8:00 PM		at Missouri	L 55–81	4–5	Mizzou Arena (3,515); Columbia, MO
12/10/2016*; 3:30 PM, ESPN3		IUPUI	W 71–68	5–5	Millett Hall (1,268); Oxford, OH
12/18/2016*; 12:00 PM, ESPNU		at UCF	L 73–80 ^{OT}	5–6	CFE Arena (2,939); Orlando, FL
12/22/2016*; 7:00 PM, ESPN3		Tennessee Tech	W 66–58	6–6	Millett Hall (1,108); Oxford, OH
12/29/2016*; 7:00 PM, ESPN3		Olivet	W 89–69	7–6	Millett Hall (1,096); Oxford, OH
MAC regular season
01/03/2017; 7:00 PM, ESPN3		Northern Illinois	W 69–67	8–6 (1–0)	Millett Hall (1,151); Oxford, OH
01/07/2017; 7:00 PM, ESPN3		at Toledo	L 76–91	8–7 (1–1)	Savage Arena (4,471); Toledo, OH
01/10/2017; 7:00 PM, ESPN3		at Ball State	L 74–85	8–8 (1–2)	Worthen Arena (3,268); Muncie, IN
01/14/2017; 7:00 PM, ESPN3		Akron	L 70–74	8–9 (1–3)	Millett Hall (3,334); Oxford, OH
01/17/2017; 8:00 PM, ESPN3		at Northern Illinois	L 58–62	8–10 (1–4)	Convocation Center (1,053); DeKalb, IL
01/21/2017; 1:30 PM		at Central Michigan	L 92–101	8–11 (1–5)	McGuirk Arena (2,708); Mount Pleasant, MI
01/24/2017; 7:00 PM, ESPN3		Buffalo	W 75–74	9–11 (2–5)	Millett Hall (1,293); Oxford, OH
01/28/2017; 3:30 PM, ESPN3		Eastern Michigan	L 57–74	9–12 (2–6)	Millett Hall (1,427); Oxford, OH
01/31/2017; 7:00 PM		at Bowling Green	L 72–83	9–13 (2–7)	Stroh Center (1,525); Bowling Green, OH
02/04/2017; 3:30 PM, ESPN3		Kent State	L 62–66	9–14 (2–8)	Millett Hall (1,474); Oxford, OH
02/07/2017; 7:00 PM, ESPN3		Western Michigan	L 55–72	9–15 (2–9)	Millett Hall (3,061); Oxford, OH
02/11/2017; 3:30 PM, ESPN3		Central Michigan	W 81–76	10–15 (3–9)	Millett Hall (1,469); Oxford, OH
02/14/2017; 7:00 PM		at Kent State	L 72–76	10–16 (3–10)	MAC Center (2,115); Kent, OH
02/18/2017; 3:30 PM, ESPN3		at Buffalo	L 58–71	10–17 (3–11)	Alumni Arena (4,002); Amherst, NY
02/21/2017; 7:00 PM, ESPN3		Ohio	L 62–79	10–18 (3–12)	Millett Hall (1,639); Oxford, OH
02/25/2017; 3:30 PM, ESPN3		Bowling Green	L 54–70	10–19 (3–13)	Millett Hall (1,586); Oxford, OH
02/28/2017; 7:00 PM, ESPN3		at Akron	W 79–75	11–19 (4–13)	James A. Rhodes Arena (3,646); Akron, OH
03/03/2017; 7:00 PM		at Ohio	L 55–69	11–20 (4–14)	Convocation Center (9,633); Athens, OH
MAC tournament
03/06/2017; 7:30 pm, ESPN3	(12)	at (5) Western Michigan; First round	L 61–65	11–21	University Arena (1,227); Kalamazoo, MI
*Non-conference game. ^{#}Rankings from AP Poll. (#) Tournament seedings in parentheses. All times are in Eastern Time Source,.

== See also ==
- 2016–17 Miami RedHawks women's basketball team
