= Antonio Campbell =

American basketball player (born 1994)

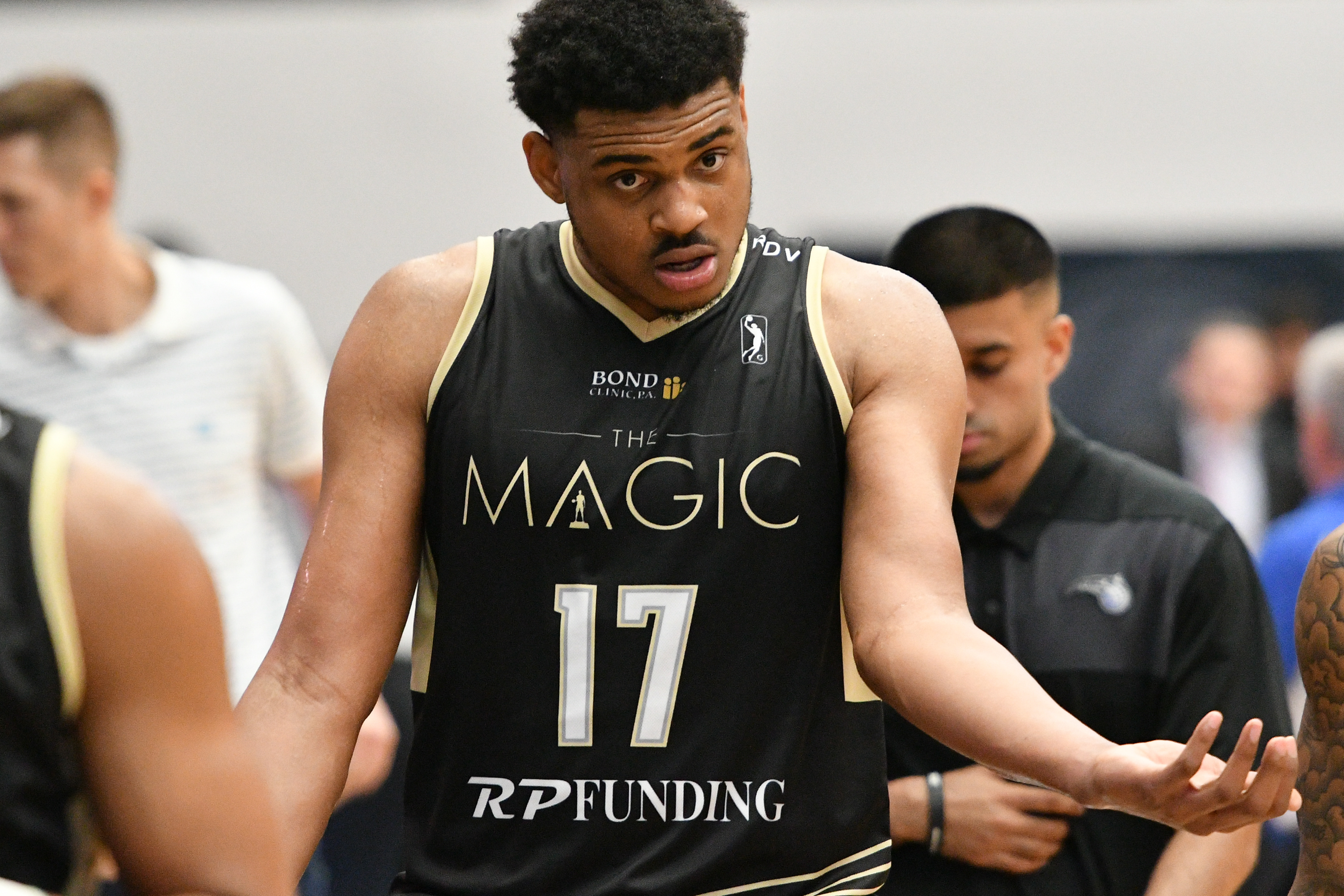
- Campbell in 2019

No. 5 – Al-Fateh
- Position: Power forward
- League: Saudi Basketball League

Personal information
- Born: December 24, 1994 (age 31) Covington, Kentucky, U.S.
- Listed height: 6 ft 9 in (2.06 m)
- Listed weight: 225 lb (102 kg)

Career information
- High school: Holy Cross (Covington, Kentucky)
- College: Ohio (2013–2017)
- NBA draft: 2017: undrafted
- Playing career: 2018–present

Career history
- 2018: Lakeland Magic
- 2018: Alaska Aces
- 2018: Pınar Karşıyaka
- 2018–2019: Lakeland Magic
- 2019: Hefei Yuanchuang
- 2019–2020: Sigortam.net İTÜ BB
- 2021: Lakeland Magic
- 2021: Prometey Kamianske
- 2021–2022: BC Astana
- 2022–2023: Al-Nassr Riyadh
- 2023: Al-Fateh
- 2023–: Alaska Aces

Career highlights
- NBA G League champion (2021); Kazakh League champion (2022); MAC Player of the Year (2016); First-team All-MAC (2016); AP Honorable Mention All-American (2016)

Antonio Campbell (born December 24, 1994) is an American basketball player for Al-Fateh of the Saudi Basketball League. He played college basketball for the Ohio Bobcats.

== College career ==
As a freshman Campbell averaged 3.8 points, 2.6 rebounds, and 9.6 minutes per game for Ohio.

In his sophomore season Campbell averaged 10.0 points, 7.6 rebounds and 24.1 minutes per game.

In his junior season, Campbell averaged 17.5 points and 10.0 rebounds per game. He was named MAC Player of the Year in 2016, receiving 18 first place votes. Despite flirting with the 2016 NBA draft, Campbell ultimately decided to return to school after not receiving a combine invite. He missed most of his senior season with a broken foot.

== Professional career ==
After going undrafted in the 2017 NBA draft, Campbell signed with the Lakeland Magic of the NBA G League on January 24, 2018, playing in 20 games and averaging 6.3 points, 4.6 rebounds and 0.7 blocks in 15.9 minutes.

On April 5, 2018, after the conclusion of the G League season, Campbell signed with the Alaska Aces of the Philippine Basketball Association. In 10 games with the Aces, Campbell averaged 22.6 points per game, 14.8 rebounds per game and 1.5 blocks per game, helping the Aces to clinch the 2nd place for the playoffs. But before the last game of the Aces, he was replaced with another import Diamon Simpson

Campbell signed with the Turkish team Pınar Karşıyaka on August 6, 2018.

On October 23, 2018, Campbell was included in the training camp roster of the Lakeland Magic.

On May 20, 2019, he signed with the Hefei Yuanchaung of the NBL-China. He scored a career-high 54 points (including a career-high 9 3-pointers) and grabbed 17 rebounds in a 125–146 loss to the Henan Golden Elephants.

On October 22, 2019, he signed with Sigortam.net İTÜ BB of the Basketball Super League. Campbell tested positive for a banned substance on March 27, 2020, and on May 15, he was issued a fine and suspended for 18 months by the Turkish Basketball Federation.

For the 2020–21 season, Campbell rejoined the Lakeland Magic where he played 7 games.

On August 25, 2021, Campbell signed with Prometey Kamianske of the Ukrainian Basketball SuperLeague. In three games, he averaged 4.7 points, 5.3 rebounds, and 1.0 block per game. On October 2, Campbell signed with Astana of the Kazakhstan Championship.

== Career statistics ==
=== International ===
Legend
GP	Games played	MPG	Minutes per game	FG%	Field goal percentage
3P%	3-point field goal percentage	FT%	Free throw percentage	RPG	Rebounds per game
APG	Assists per game	SPG	Steals per game	BPG	Blocks per game
PPG	Points per game	**Bold**	Career high		Led the league

Year	Team	League	GP	MPG	FG%	3P%	FT%	RPG	APG	SPG	BPG	PPG
2018	Alaska	PBA	10	**31.69**	**.450**	**.380**	**.750**	**14.8**	**2.0**	**1.20**	**1.50**	**22.6**
