= 2016–17 Buffalo Bulls men's basketball team =

American college basketball season

2016–17 Buffalo Bulls men's basketball
- Conference: Mid-American Conference
- East Division
- Record: 17–15 (11–7 MAC)
- Head coach: Nate Oats (2nd season)
- Assistant coaches: Jim Whitesell (2nd season); Bryan Hodgson (2nd season); Lindsey Hunter (1st season)
- Home arena: Alumni Arena

2016–17 Mid-American Conference men's basketball standings
	Conf.				Overall
Team	W		L	PCT	W		L	PCT
East
Akron	14	–	4	.778	27	–	9	.750
Ohio	11	–	7	.611	20	–	11	.645
Buffalo	11	–	7	.611	17	–	15	.531
Kent State †	10	–	8	.556	22	–	14	.611
Bowling Green	7	–	11	.389	13	–	19	.406
Miami (OH)	4	–	14	.222	11	–	21	.344
West
Ball State	11	–	7	.611	21	–	13	.618
Western Michigan	11	–	7	.611	16	–	16	.500
Toledo	9	–	9	.500	17	–	17	.500
Eastern Michigan	7	–	11	.389	16	–	17	.485
Northern Illinois	7	–	11	.389	15	–	17	.469
Central Michigan	6	–	12	.333	16	–	16	.500
† 2017 MAC tournament winner

The 2016–17 Buffalo Bulls men's basketball team represented the State University of New York at Buffalo during the 2016–17 NCAA Division I men's basketball season. The Bulls, led by second-year head coach Nate Oats, played their home games at Alumni Arena as members of the East Division of the Mid-American Conference. They finished the season 17–14, 11–7 in MAC play to finish in a tie for second place. As the No. 3 seed in the MAC tournament, they lost in the quarterfinals to Kent State.

== Previous season ==
The Bulls finished the 2015–16 season 20–15, 10–8 in MAC play to finish in a tie for third place in the East Division and third place overall. They defeated Miami (OH), Ohio, and Akron to be champions of the MAC tournament and earn the conference's automatic bid to the NCAA tournament. In their second consecutive trip to the NCAA Tournament, they lost to Miami (FL) in the first round.

== Departures ==
Name	Number	Pos.	Height	Weight	Year	Hometown	Notes
Lamonte Bearden	1	G	6'3"	160	Sophomore	Milwaukee, WI	Transferred to Western Kentucky
Mory Diane	5	G	6'3"	175	Sophomore	Detroit, MI	Transferred to Ferris State
Jarryn Skeete	10	G	6'3"	185	Senior	Brampton, ON	Graduated
Zac DiSalvo	15	G	5'11"	165	Freshman	Rochester, NY	Walk-on; left the team for personal reasons
Rodell Wigginton	20	G/F	6'5"	215	Senior	Dartmouth, NS	Graduated
Tyler Moffe	35	G	6'1"	168	Freshman	Elmria, NY	Walk-on; transferred to Jamestown CC

== Recruiting class of 2016 ==
College recruiting information
Name	Hometown	School	Height	Weight	Commit date
Davonta Jordan #30 PG	Montverde, FL	Montverde Academy	6 ft 1 in (1.85 m)	165 lb (75 kg)	
Davonta Jordan #30 PG	Recruit ratings: Scout: Rivals: (79)				
Quate McKinzie #42 PF	Burgaw, NC	Pender High School	6 ft 7 in (2.01 m)	205 lb (93 kg)	Sep 14, 2015
Quate McKinzie #42 PF	Recruit ratings: Scout: Rivals: (77)				
Brock Bertram #41 C	Apple Valley, MN	Apple Valley High School	6 ft 11 in (2.11 m)	250 lb (110 kg)	Oct 27, 2015
Brock Bertram #41 C	Recruit ratings: Scout: Rivals: (75)				
James Jones; SG	Chicago, IL	Bogan High School	6 ft 3 in (1.91 m)	185 lb (84 kg)	Oct 19, 2015
James Jones; SG	Recruit ratings: Scout: Rivals: (NR)				
Overall recruit ranking:
Note: In many cases, Scout, Rivals, 247Sports, On3, and ESPN may conflict in their listings of height and weight.; In these cases, the average was taken. ESPN grades are on a 100-point scale.; Sources: "2016 Team Ranking". Rivals.

=== Recruiting class of 2017 ===
College recruiting information (2016)
Name	Hometown	School	Height	Weight	Commit date
James Reese; SG	Columbia, SC	A. C. Flora High School	6 ft 3 in (1.91 m)	185 lb (84 kg)	Oct 1, 2016
James Reese; SG	Recruit ratings: Scout: Rivals: (NR)				
Overall recruit ranking:
Note: In many cases, Scout, Rivals, 247Sports, On3, and ESPN may conflict in their listings of height and weight.; In these cases, the average was taken. ESPN grades are on a 100-point scale.; Sources: "2017 Team Ranking". Rivals.

== Roster ==
2016–17 Buffalo Bulls men's basketball team
Players
Coaches

Pos.	#	Name	Height	Weight	Year	Previous school	Hometown
G/F	0	Blake Hamilton	6 ft 6 in (1.98 m)	205 lb (93 kg)	Sr	Pasadena; Mt. San Antonio College	Pasadena, CA
G	1	James Jones	6 ft 4 in (1.93 m)	177 lb (80 kg)	Fr	Bogan	Chicago, IL
G/F	2	Willie Conner	6 ft 5 in (1.96 m)	200 lb (91 kg)	Sr	Richard T. Crane; Angelina College	Chicago, IL
G	3	Davonta Jordan	6 ft 2 in (1.88 m)	185 lb (84 kg)	Fr	Montverde Academy	Cocoa, FL
F	4	David Kadiri	6 ft 8 in (2.03 m)	210 lb (95 kg)	Sr	Coolidge; South Plains College	Laurel, MD
G	5	C. J. Massinburg	6 ft 3 in (1.91 m)	170 lb (77 kg)	So	South Oak Cliff	Dallas, TX
G	10	Graham Dolan (W)	6 ft 5 in (1.96 m)	175 lb (79 kg)	Fr	Williamsville South	Williamsville, NY
G	22	Dontay Caruthers	6 ft 1 in (1.85 m)	195 lb (88 kg)	RS So	East; Midland/Indian Hills	Rochester, NY
G	22	Christian Pino (W)	5 ft 7 in (1.7 m)	145 lb (66 kg)	RS Jr	Romulus HS; Arizona State	Detroit, MI
F	24	Quate McKinzie	6 ft 8 in (2.03 m)	195 lb (88 kg)	Fr	Harrells Christian Academy	Burgaw, NC
F	31	Raheem Johnson	6 ft 10 in (2.08 m)	235 lb (107 kg)	RS Sr	Romulus HS; Barton CC	Detroit, MI
F	33	Nick Perkins	6 ft 8 in (2.03 m)	260 lb (118 kg)	So	Milan HS	Ypsilanti, MI
F	34	Ikenna Smart	6 ft 10 in (2.08 m)	235 lb (107 kg)	RS So	New Garden Friends School	Greensboro, NC
C	41	Brock Bertram	6 ft 11 in (2.11 m)	250 lb (113 kg)	Fr	Apple Valley	Apple Valley, MN
G/F	42	Nikola Rakićević	6 ft 5 in (1.96 m)	185 lb (84 kg)	So	E-Gimnazija Novi Sad	Smederevska Palanka, Serbia

Head coach

- Nate Oats (Maranatha Baptist)

Assistant coach(es)

- Jim Whitesell (Luther)
- Lindsey Hunter (Jackson State)
- Bryan Hodgson (Fredonia State)

Legend

- (C) Team captain
- (S) Suspended
- (I) Ineligible
- (W) Walk-on
- Injured
- Current redshirt

Roster

== Schedule and results ==
Date time, TV	Rank^{#}	Opponent^{#}	Result	Record	High points	High rebounds	High assists	Site (attendance) city, state
Exhibition
11/04/2016*; 8:30 PM		Daemen	W 87–82 ^{OT}		27 – Massinburg	8 – Tied	5 – Tied	Alumni Arena (3,402); Amherst, NY
Non-conference regular season
11/11/2016*; 8:00 PM		at Niagara	W 77–66	1–0	20 – Connor	8 – Tied	7 – Jordan	Gallagher Center (2,016); Lewiston, NY
11/14/2016*; 7:00 PM, CBSSN		at No. 11 Xavier	L 53–86	1–1	15 – Perkins	7 – Perkins	7 – Jordan	Cintas Center (10,116); Cincinnati, OH
11/17/2016*; 7:00 PM		Nazareth; Great Alaska Shootout opening round	W 85–38	2–1	21 – Perkins	8 – Perkins	11 – Hamilton	Alumni Arena (3,152); Amherst, NY
11/23/2016*; 11:00 PM, CBSSN		at Alaska Anchorage; Great Alaska Shootout quarterfinals	W 85–79	3–1	36 – Hamilton	8 – Hamilton	7 – Jordan	Alaska Airlines Center (2,606); Anchorage, AK
11/25/2016*; 8:00 pm, CBSSN		vs. Nevada; Great Alaska Shootout semifinals	L 62–67	3–2	14 – Hamilton	9 – Perkins	7 – Jordan	Alaska Airlines Center (2,723); Anchorage, AK
11/26/2016*; 9:30 PM		vs. Weber State; Great Alaska Shootout 3rd place game	W 74–72	4–2	23 – Hamilton	10 – Perkins	4 – Connor	Alaska Airlines Center (2,851); Anchorage, AK
11/29/2016*; 8:30 PM, FS1		at No. 10 Creighton	L 72–93	4–3	23 – Tied	7 – Tied	10 – Jordan	CenturyLink Center (16,434); Omaha, NE
12/03/2016*; 4:00 PM		at St. Bonaventure	L 84–90	4–4	24 – Perkins	6 – Tied	7 – Jordan	Reilly Center (5,012); Olean, NY
12/07/2016*; 7:00 PM, ACCN Extra		at Pittsburgh	L 79–84	4–5	23 – Perkins	8 – Perkins	6 – Jordan	Petersen Events Center (7,007); Pittsburgh, PA
12/10/2016*; 7:00 PM		Coppin State	W 87–52	5–5	28 – Connor	9 – McKinzie	6 – Hamilton	Alumni Arena (3,457); Amherst, NY
12/17/2016*; 3:30 PM		vs. Canisius; Big 4 Basketball Classic	L 87–94	5–6	19 – Hamilton	11 – Hamilton	4 – Tied	KeyBank Center (5,327); Buffalo, NY
12/21/2016*; 7:00 PM		vs. Robert Morris	L 71–74	5–7	24 – Hamilton	11 – Perkins	4 – Hamilton	Consol Energy Center (506); Pittsburgh, PA
12/30/2016*; 7:00 PM		Maine	W 79–60	6–7	15 – Tied	9 – Hamilton	4 – Massinburg	Alumni Arena (2,784); Amherst, NY
MAC regular season
01/03/2017; 7:00 PM, ESPN3		at Toledo	L 54–86	6–8 (0–1)	12 – McKinzie	6 – McKinzie	2 – Tied	Savage Arena (3,688); Toledo, OH
01/07/2017; 2:30 PM, ESPN3		at Eastern Michigan	W 77–68	7–8 (1–1)	21 – Hamilton	10 – Massinburg	4 – Caruthers	Convocation Center (1,862); Ypsilanti, MI
01/10/2017; 7:30 PM, ESPN3		Ohio	L 72–74	7–9 (1–2)	17 – Hamilton	13 – Hamilton	6 – Hamilton	Alumni Arena (2,652); Amherst, NY
01/14/2017; 2:00 PM, ESPN3		Ball State	L 77–92	7–10 (1–3)	23 – Kadiri	11 – Kadiri	9 – Hamilton	Alumni Arena (3,007); Amherst, NY
01/17/2017; 7:00 PM		at Kent State	W 82–69	8–10 (2–3)	22 – Massinburg	9 – Massinburg	4 – Massinburg	MAC Center (2,110); Kent, OH
01/21/2017; 3:30 PM, ESPN3		Western Michigan	W 66–54	9–10 (3–3)	21 – Perkins	10 – Perkins	10 – Hamilton	Alumni Arena (3,284); Amherst, NY
01/24/2017; 7:00 PM, ESPN3		at Miami (OH)	L 74–75	9–11 (3–4)	20 – Perkins	10 – Kadiri	4 – Massinburg	Millett Hall (1,293); Oxford, OH
01/28/2017; 7:30 PM		at Akron	L 90–91	9–12 (3–5)	33 – Hamilton	8 – Perkins	2 – Tied	James A. Rhodes Arena (4,884); Akron, OH
01/31/2017; 7:00 PM, ESPN3		Central Michigan	W 101–91	10–12 (4–5)	27 – Hamilton	11 – Hamilton	8 – Hamilton	Alumni Arena (4,631); Amherst, NY
02/03/2017; 9:00 PM, ESPNU		at Ball State	W 96–69	11–12 (5–5)	25 – Hamilton	6 – Tied	8 – Hamilton	Worthen Arena (3,326); Muncie, IN
02/07/2017; 7:00 PM, ESPN3		Northern Illinois	W 65–45	12–12 (6–5)	17 – Massinburg	12 – Perkins	4 – Tied	Alumni Arena (3,212); Amherst, NY
02/11/2017; 12:00 PM, ESPN3		at Bowling Green	W 88–74	13–12 (7–5)	19 – Hamilton	12 – Connor	3 – Caruthers	Stroh Center (2,035); Bowling Green, OH
02/14/2017; 7:00 PM, ASN		at Central Michigan	W 99–93	14–12 (8–5)	22 – Connor	9 – Massinburg	7 – Hamilton	McGuirk Arena (2,560); Mount Pleasant, MI
02/18/2017; 3:30 PM, ESPN3		Miami (OH)	W 71–58	15–12 (9–5)	23 – Hamilton	6 – Tied	7 – Caruthers	Alumni Arena (4,002); Amherst, NY
02/21/2017; 7:00 PM, ESPN3		Kent State	L 69–77	15–13 (9–6)	22 – Hamilton	7 – Tied	5 – Hamilton	Alumni Arena (3,212); Amherst, NY
02/24/2017; 8:00 PM, CBSSN		Akron	L 83–89	15–14 (9–7)	23 – Hamilton	10 – Massinburg	6 – Hamilton	Alumni Arena (6,598); Amherst, NY
02/28/2017; 7:00 PM, ESPN3		at Ohio	W 83–79	16–14 (10–7)	19 – Tied	6 – Kadiri	5 – Hamilton	Convocation Center (5,672); Athens, OH
03/03/2017; 7:00 PM, ESPN3		Bowling Green	W 80–68	17–14 (11–7)	32 – Hamilton	9 – Kadiri	6 – Hamilton	Alumni Arena (3,969); Amherst, NY
MAC Tournament
03/09/2017; 9:00 pm	(3)	vs. (6) Kent State; Quarterfinals	L 65–68	17–15	17 – Hamilton	12 – Massinburg	3 – Caruthers	Quicken Loans Arena; Cleveland, OH
*Non-conference game. ^{#}Rankings from AP Poll. (#) Tournament seedings in parentheses. All times are in Eastern Time. Source

== See also ==
- 2016–17 Buffalo Bulls women's basketball team
