= 2016–17 Central Michigan Chippewas men's basketball team =

American college basketball season

2016–17 Central Michigan Chippewas men's basketball
- Conference: Mid-American Conference
- West Division
- Record: 16–16 (6–12 MAC)
- Head coach: Keno Davis (5th season)
- Assistant coaches: Kevin Gamble; Kyle Gerdeman; Jeff Smith
- Home arena: McGuirk Arena

2016–17 Mid-American Conference men's basketball standings
	Conf.				Overall
Team	W		L	PCT	W		L	PCT
East
Akron	14	–	4	.778	27	–	9	.750
Ohio	11	–	7	.611	20	–	11	.645
Buffalo	11	–	7	.611	17	–	15	.531
Kent State †	10	–	8	.556	22	–	14	.611
Bowling Green	7	–	11	.389	13	–	19	.406
Miami (OH)	4	–	14	.222	11	–	21	.344
West
Ball State	11	–	7	.611	21	–	13	.618
Western Michigan	11	–	7	.611	16	–	16	.500
Toledo	9	–	9	.500	17	–	17	.500
Eastern Michigan	7	–	11	.389	16	–	17	.485
Northern Illinois	7	–	11	.389	15	–	17	.469
Central Michigan	6	–	12	.333	16	–	16	.500
† 2017 MAC tournament winner

The 2016–17 Central Michigan Chippewas men's basketball team represented Central Michigan University during the 2016–17 NCAA Division I men's basketball season. The Chippewas, led by fifth-year head coach Keno Davis, played their home games at McGuirk Arena as members of the West Division of the Mid-American Conference. They finished the season 16–16, 6–12 in MAC play to finish in last place in the West Division. As the No. 11 seed in the MAC tournament, they lost in the first round to Kent State.

== Previous season ==
The Chippewas finished the 2015–16 season 17–16, 10–8 in MAC play to finish in a tie for the West Division championship. They lost in the quarterfinals of the MAC tournament to Bowling Green. They were invited to the CollegeInsider.com Tournament where they lost in the first round to Tennessee–Martin.

== Departures ==
Name	Number	Pos.	Height	Weight	Year	Hometown	Notes
Rayshawn Simmons	4	G	6'4"	185	Senior	St. Louis, MO	Graduated
Austin Stewart	10	G	6'6"	215	Senior	Normal, IL	Graduated
Milos Cabarkapa	11	C	7'0"	245	RS Sophomore	Belgrade, Serbia	Transferred to Indianapolis
Chris Fowler	15	G	6'1"	195	Senior	Southfield, MI	Graduated
Tedaro France III	22	G	6'0"	170	Junior	New Haven, MI	Walk-on; didn't return
John Simons	34	F	6'8"	220	Senior	Cadillac, MI	Graduated

=== Incoming transfers ===
Name	Number	Pos.	Height	Weight	Year	Hometown	Previous School
Cecil Williams	21	F	6'6"	208	Junior	Columbia, MO	Junior college transferred from Moberly Area CC

== Recruiting class of 2016 ==
College recruiting information
Name	Hometown	School	Height	Weight	Commit date
David DiLeo; SF	Iowa City, IA	New Hampton School	6 ft 7 in (2.01 m)	210 lb (95 kg)	Nov 17, 2015
David DiLeo; SF	Recruit ratings: Scout: Rivals: (65)				
Innocent Nwoko; C	New Haven, MI	New Haven High School	6 ft 11 in (2.11 m)	220 lb (100 kg)	Sep 14, 2014
Innocent Nwoko; C	Recruit ratings: Scout: Rivals: (NR)				
Matty Smith; PG	South Elgin, IL	South Elgin High School	6 ft 0 in (1.83 m)	175 lb (79 kg)	Apr 26, 2015
Matty Smith; PG	Recruit ratings: Scout: Rivals: (NR)				
Ellis Jefferson; PG	San Antonio, TX	Brandeis High School	6 ft 1 in (1.85 m)	160 lb (73 kg)	Sep 3, 2015
Ellis Jefferson; PG	Recruit ratings: Scout: Rivals: (NR)				
Kevin McKay; SG	Warren, MI	De La Salle Collegiate High School	6 ft 4 in (1.93 m)	218 lb (99 kg)	
Kevin McKay; SG	Recruit ratings: Scout: Rivals: (NR)				
Overall recruit ranking:
Note: In many cases, Scout, Rivals, 247Sports, On3, and ESPN may conflict in their listings of height and weight.; In these cases, the average was taken. ESPN grades are on a 100-point scale.; Sources: "2016 Team Ranking". Rivals.

=== Recruiting class of 2017 ===
College recruiting information (2017)
Name	Hometown	School	Height	Weight	Commit date
A.J. Bullard; PF	The Woodlands, TX	The Woodlands High School	6 ft 9 in (2.06 m)	195 lb (88 kg)	Oct 3, 2016
A.J. Bullard; PF	Recruit ratings: Scout: Rivals: (NR)				
Overall recruit ranking:
Note: In many cases, Scout, Rivals, 247Sports, On3, and ESPN may conflict in their listings of height and weight.; In these cases, the average was taken. ESPN grades are on a 100-point scale.; Sources: "2017 Team Ranking". Rivals.

=== Recruiting class of 2018 ===
College recruiting information (2018)
Name	Hometown	School	Height	Weight	Commit date
P.J. Mitchell; PG	Detroit, MI	Loyola High School	5 ft 9 in (1.75 m)	N/A	
P.J. Mitchell; PG	Recruit ratings: Scout: Rivals: (NR)				
Overall recruit ranking:
Note: In many cases, Scout, Rivals, 247Sports, On3, and ESPN may conflict in their listings of height and weight.; In these cases, the average was taken. ESPN grades are on a 100-point scale.; Sources: "2018 Team Ranking". Rivals.

== Roster ==
2016–17 Central Michigan Chippewas men's basketball team
Players
Coaches

Pos.	#	Name	Height	Weight	Year	Previous school	Hometown
G	0	Ellis Jefferson	6 ft 0 in (1.83 m)	175 lb (79 kg)	Fr	Brandeis	San Antonio, TX
G	1	Corey Redman	6 ft 6 in (1.98 m)	185 lb (84 kg)	So	Boyne City	Boyne City, MI
G	2	Braylon Rayson	5 ft 9 in (1.75 m)	190 lb (86 kg)	Sr	West Mesquite	Dallas, TX
G	3	Marcus Keene	5 ft 9 in (1.75 m)	175 lb (79 kg)	RS Jr	Warren; Youngstown State	San Antonio, TX
G	4	Tanner Beachnau (W)	6 ft 0 in (1.83 m)	175 lb (79 kg)	Sr	Holt	Holt, MI
G	5	Janeau Joubert (W)	6 ft 1 in (1.85 m)	160 lb (73 kg)	So	Ypsilanti	Belleville, MI
C	11	Innocent Nwoko	6 ft 11 in (2.11 m)	225 lb (102 kg)	Fr	New Haven	New Haven, MI
G	12	Josh Kozinski	6 ft 4 in (1.93 m)	185 lb (84 kg)	RS Jr	Edwardsburg HS	Edwardsburg, MI
G	13	Hunter Hale (W)	6 ft 2 in (1.88 m)	165 lb (75 kg)	So	Kalamazoo Central HS	Kalamazoo, MI
F	14	David DiLeo	6 ft 8 in (2.03 m)	205 lb (93 kg)	Fr	New Hampton School	Iowa City, IA
G	15	Matty Smith	5 ft 11 in (1.8 m)	180 lb (82 kg)	Fr	South Elgin	Elgin, IL
G	20	Kevin McKay	6 ft 5 in (1.96 m)	210 lb (95 kg)	Fr	Warren De La Salle	Warren, MI
F	21	Cecil Williams	6 ft 6 in (1.98 m)	210 lb (95 kg)	Jr	IMG Academy; Moberly Area CC	Columbia, MO
G	23	DaRohn Scott	6 ft 9 in (2.06 m)	230 lb (104 kg)	So	Grand Rapids Christian	Grand Rapids, MI
F	24	Luke Meyer (W)	6 ft 11 in (2.11 m)	225 lb (102 kg)	So	Addison	Addison, MI
F	32	Blake Hibbitts	6 ft 7 in (2.01 m)	215 lb (98 kg)	RS Sr	Hudsonville	Hudsonville, MI
F	35	John McCarty (W)	6 ft 5 in (1.96 m)	210 lb (95 kg)	Jr	Lake Orion	Lake Orion, MI
C	55	Cole Israelson (W)	6 ft 9 in (2.06 m)	250 lb (113 kg)	RS Jr	Cass City	Cass City, MI

Head coach

- Keno Davis (Iowa)

Assistant coach(es)

- Kevin Gamble (Iowa)
- Jeff Smith (Southeast Missouri State)
- Kyle Gerdeman (Alma)

Legend

- (C) Team captain
- (S) Suspended
- (I) Ineligible
- (W) Walk-on
- Injured
- Current redshirt

Roster

== Schedule and results ==
Date time, TV	Rank^{#}	Opponent^{#}	Result	Record	Site (attendance) city, state
Exhibition
11/05/2016*; 1:30 PM		Slippery Rock	W 91–74		McGuirk Arena (1,762); Mount Pleasant, MI
Non-conference regular season
11/11/2016*; 7:00 PM, ESPN3		IU Kokomo	W 117–53	1–0	McGuirk Arena (2,498); Mount Pleasant, MI
11/14/2016*; 8:30 PM		at Tennessee Tech	W 86–74	2–0	Eblen Center (1,546); Cookeville, TN
11/17/2016*; 7:00 PM, CSN		Marygrove	W 107–58	3–0	McGuirk Arena (2,096); Mount Pleasant, MI
11/21/2016*; 8:30 PM		vs. Pepperdine; Lone Star Showcase	W 88–77	4–0	H-E-B Center at Cedar Park (600); Cedar Park, TX
11/22/2016*; 6:00 PM		vs. St. Bonaventure; Lone Star Showcase	L 71–102	4–1	H-E-B Center at Cedar Park (557); Cedar Park, TX
11/23/2016*; 8:30 PM		vs. Little Rock; Lone Star Showcase	L 79–91	4–2	H-E-B Center at Cedar Park (760); Cedar Park, TX
11/26/2016*; 3:00 PM, ESPN3		at Green Bay	W 89–77	5–2	Resch Center (2,799); Green Bay, WI
11/29/2016*; 7:00 PM, ESPN3		William & Mary	W 91–81	6–2	McGuirk Arena (2,453); Mount Pleasant, MI
12/03/2016*; 4:30 PM, ESPN3		Arkansas–Pine Bluff	W 82–59	7–2	McGuirk Arena (2,491); Mount Pleasant, MI
12/06/2016*; 7:00 PM, ESPN3		Green Bay	W 107–97	8–2	McGuirk Arena (2,266); Mount Pleasant, MI
12/10/2016*; 3:00 PM, BTN+		at Illinois	L 73–92	8–3	State Farm Center (13,045); Champaign, IL
12/21/2016; 9:00 PM		at Montana State	W 106–103	9–3	Brick Breeden Fieldhouse (2,066); Bozeman, MT
12/30/2016*; 5:30 PM, ESPN3		Chicago State	W 90–82	10–3	McGuirk Arena (2,450); Mount Pleasant, MI
MAC regular season
01/03/2017; 7:00 PM, ESPN3		at Eastern Michigan; Michigan MAC Trophy	L 63–85	10–4 (0–1)	Convocation Center (1,472); Ypsilanti, MI
01/07/2017; 4:00 PM, ESPN3		at Northern Illinois	L 83–87	10–5 (0–2)	Convocation Center (1,717); DeKalb, IL
01/10/2017; 7:00 PM, ESPN3		Akron	L 85–89	10–6 (0–3)	McGuirk Arena (2,302); Mount Pleasant, MI
01/13/2017; 7:00 PM, CBSSN		Toledo	W 96–88	11–6 (1–3)	McGuirk Arena (2,684); Mount Pleasant, MI
01/17/2017; 7:00 PM, ESPN3		at Ball State	L 83–98	11–7 (1–4)	Worthen Arena (3,044); Muncie, IN
01/21/2017; 1:30 PM, ESPN3		Miami (OH)	W 101–92	12–7 (2–4)	McGuirk Arena (2,708); Mount Pleasant, MI
01/24/2017; 7:00 PM, ESPN3		Bowling Green	W 82–76	13–7 (3–4)	McGuirk Arena (2,528); Mount Pleasant, MI
01/28/2017; 7:00 PM		at Kent State	W 105–98 ^{OT}	14–7 (4–4)	MAC Center (3,127); Kent, OH
01/31/2017; 7:00 PM		at Buffalo	L 91–101	14–8 (4–5)	Alumni Hall (4,631); Amherst, NY
02/04/2017; 4:30 PM, ESPN3		Western Michigan; Michigan MAC Trophy	W 86–82	15–8 (5–5)	McGuirk Arena (5,412); Mount Pleasant, MI
02/07/2017; 7:00 PM		at Ohio	W 97–87	16–8 (6–5)	Convocation Center (7,063); Athens, OH
02/11/2017; 3:30 PM, ESPN3		at Miami (OH)	L 76–81	16–9 (6–6)	Millett Hall (1,469); Oxford, OH
02/14/2017; 7:00 PM, ESPN3		Buffalo	L 93–99	16–10 (6–7)	McGuirk Arena (2,560); Mount Pleasant, MI
02/18/2017; 4:30 PM, ESPN3		Ball State	L 100–109 ^{OT}	16–11 (6–8)	McGuirk Arena; Mount Pleasant, MI
02/21/2017; 7:00 PM, ESPN3		Northern Illinois	L 66–89	16–12 (6–9)	McGuirk Arena (2,531); Mount Pleasant, MI
02/25/2017; 7:00 PM, ESPN3		at Toledo	L 66–87	16–13 (6–10)	Savage Arena (4,463); Toledo, OH
02/28/2017; 7:00 PM, ESPN3		Eastern Michigan; Michigan MAC Trophy	L 81–109	16–14 (6–11)	McGuirk Arena (2,945); Mount Pleasant, MI
03/03/2017; 7:00 PM, ESPN3		at Western Michigan; Michigan MAC Trophy	L 80–88	16–15 (6–12)	University Arena (4,194); Kalamazoo, MI
MAC tournament
03/06/2017; 7:00 pm, ESPN3	(11)	at (6) Kent State; First round	L 106–116 ^{OT}	16–16	MAC Center (2,139); Kent, OH
*Non-conference game. ^{#}Rankings from AP Poll. (#) Tournament seedings in parentheses. All times are in Eastern Time Source.

== See also ==
- 2016–17 Central Michigan Chippewas women's basketball team
