= 1978–79 Ohio Bobcats men's basketball team =

American college basketball season

1978–79 Ohio Bobcats men's basketball
- Conference: Mid-American Conference
- Record: 16–11 (10–6 MAC)
- Head coach: Dale Bandy (5th season)
- Home arena: Convocation Center

1978–79 Mid-American Conference men's basketball standings
	Conf.				Overall
Team	W		L	PCT	W		L	PCT
No. 19 Toledo	13	–	3	.813	22	–	8	.733
Central Michigan	13	–	3	.813	19	–	9	.679
Ohio	10	–	6	.625	16	–	11	.593
Ball State	9	–	7	.563	16	–	11	.593
Northern Illinois	8	–	8	.500	14	–	13	.519
Kent State	7	–	9	.438	13	–	14	.481
Bowling Green State	6	–	10	.375	14	–	13	.519
Miami (Ohio)	6	–	10	.375	9	–	18	.333
Eastern Michigan	5	–	11	.313	9	–	18	.333
Western Michigan	3	–	13	.188	7	–	23	.233
Rankings from AP Poll

The 1978–79 Ohio Bobcats men's basketball team represented Ohio University as a member of the Mid-American Conference in the college basketball season of 1978–79. The team was coached by Dale Bandy in his fifth season at Ohio. They played their home games at Convocation Center. The Bobcats finished with a record of 16–11 and third in the MAC regular season with a conference record of 10–6.

== Schedule ==
Date time, TV	Rank^{#}	Opponent^{#}	Result	Record	Site (attendance) city, state
Regular Season
11/30/1978*		at Florida	L 61–96	0–1	
12/2/1978*		at Stetson	W 98–95	1–1	
12/6/1978*		Marietta	W 92–71	2–1	
12/9/1978		Ball State	L 69–70	2–2 (0–1)	
12/16/1978*		at Youngstown State	W 86–71	3–2	
12/18/1978*		at Cleveland State	W 76–74	4–2	
12/29/1978*		at West Virginia; West Virginia Classic	W 78–76	5–2	
12/30/1978*		vs. Duquesne; West Virginia Classic	L 74–85	5–3	
MAC regular season
1/6/1979		Western Michigan	W 101–82	6–3 (1–1)	
1/10/1979		at Miami (OH)	W 74–68	7–3 (2–1)	
1/13/1979		Eastern Michigan	W 76–64	8–3 (3–1)	
1/17/1979		at Central Michigan	L 70–71	8–4 (3–2)	
1/20/1979		Bowling Green	L 77–79 ^{OT}	8–5 (3–3)	
1/22/1979*		St. Bonaventure	L 81–84 ^{OT}	8-6	
1/24/1979		at Toledo	L 67–79	8-7 (3-4)	
1/27/1979		Northern Illinois	W 94–78	9–7 (4-4)	
1/31/1979*		at Marshall	L 81–94	9–8	
2/3/1979		at Kent State	W 85–84 ^{OT}	10–8 (5–4)	
2/7/1979		Miami (OH)	W 75–60	11–8 (6–4)	
2/10/1979		at Western Michigan	W 82–70	12–8 (7–4)	
2/12/1979*		at Loyola (IL)	L 75–104	12–9	
2/17/1979		at Eastern Michigan	W 86–82	13–9 (8–4)	
2/21/1979		Central Michigan	L 62–80	13–10 (8–5)	
2/24/1979		at Bowling Green	W 80–71	14–10 (9–5)	
2/26/1979*		Robert Morris	W 75–74	15–10	
2/28/1979		Toledo	L 70–75	15–11 (10–5)	
3/3/1979		at Ball State	W 81–74	16–11 (10–6)	
*Non-conference game. ^{#}Rankings from AP Poll. (#) Tournament seedings in parentheses. All times are in Eastern Time.

== Statistics ==
=== Team statistics ===
Final 1978–79 statistics

Record	Ohio	OPP
Scoring	2126	2111
Scoring Average	78.74	78.19
Field goals – Att	851–1805	834–1742
Free throws – Att	424–588	443–649
Rebounds	1030	1091
Assists	492	359
Turnovers		
Steals	201	162
Blocked Shots	72	60

=== Player statistics ===
			Minutes		Scoring		Total FGs			Free-Throws			Rebounds						
Player	GP	GS	Tot	Avg	Pts	Avg	FG	FGA	Pct	FT	FTA	Pct	Tot	Avg	A	PF	TO	Stl	Blk
Tim Joyce	27	-	937	34.7	594	22.0	230	466	0.494	134	163	0.822	140	5.2	117	84		31	6
Steve Skaggs	27	-	949	35.1	472	17.5	196	425	0.461	80	99	0.808	71	2.6	77	73		26	2
Brewer Gray	27	-	723	26.8	208	7.7	90	180	0.500	28	46	0.609	225	8.3	49	81		31	25
Doug Graves	27	-	762	28.2	205	7.6	91	180	0.506	23	38	0.605	157	5.8	21	68		12	16
Kirk Lehman	26	-	519	20.0	184	7.1	69	142	0.486	46	57	0.807	36	1.4	68	55		24	2
Spindle Graves	27	-	548	20.3	142	5.3	51	128	0.398	40	67	0.597	71	2.6	103	107		45	4
Jim Zalenka	26	-	311	12.0	118	4.5	46	103	0.447	26	36	0.722	82	3.2	14	46		11	8
Harold Moore	27	-	308	11.4	94	3.5	39	89	0.438	16	30	0.533	50	1.9	25	24		9	2
Bill Littlefield	20	-	125	6.3	54	2.7	18	41	0.439	18	26	0.692	20	1.0	9	22		5	1
John Patterson	25	-	227	9.1	38	1.5	16	40	0.400	6	12	0.500	38	1.5	4	40		3	4
Total	27	-	-	-	2126	78.7	851	1805	0.471	424	588	0.721	1030	38.1	492	615		201	72
Opponents	27	-	-	-	2111	78.2	834	1742	0.479	443	649	0.683	1091	40.4	359	575		162	60

Legend
GP	Games played	GS	Games started	Avg	Average per game
FG	Field-goals made	FGA	Field-goal attempts	Off	Offensive rebounds
Def	Defensive rebounds	A	Assists	TO	Turnovers
Blk	Blocks	Stl	Steals	High	Team high
