= Jaaron Simmons =

American basketball player (born 1995)

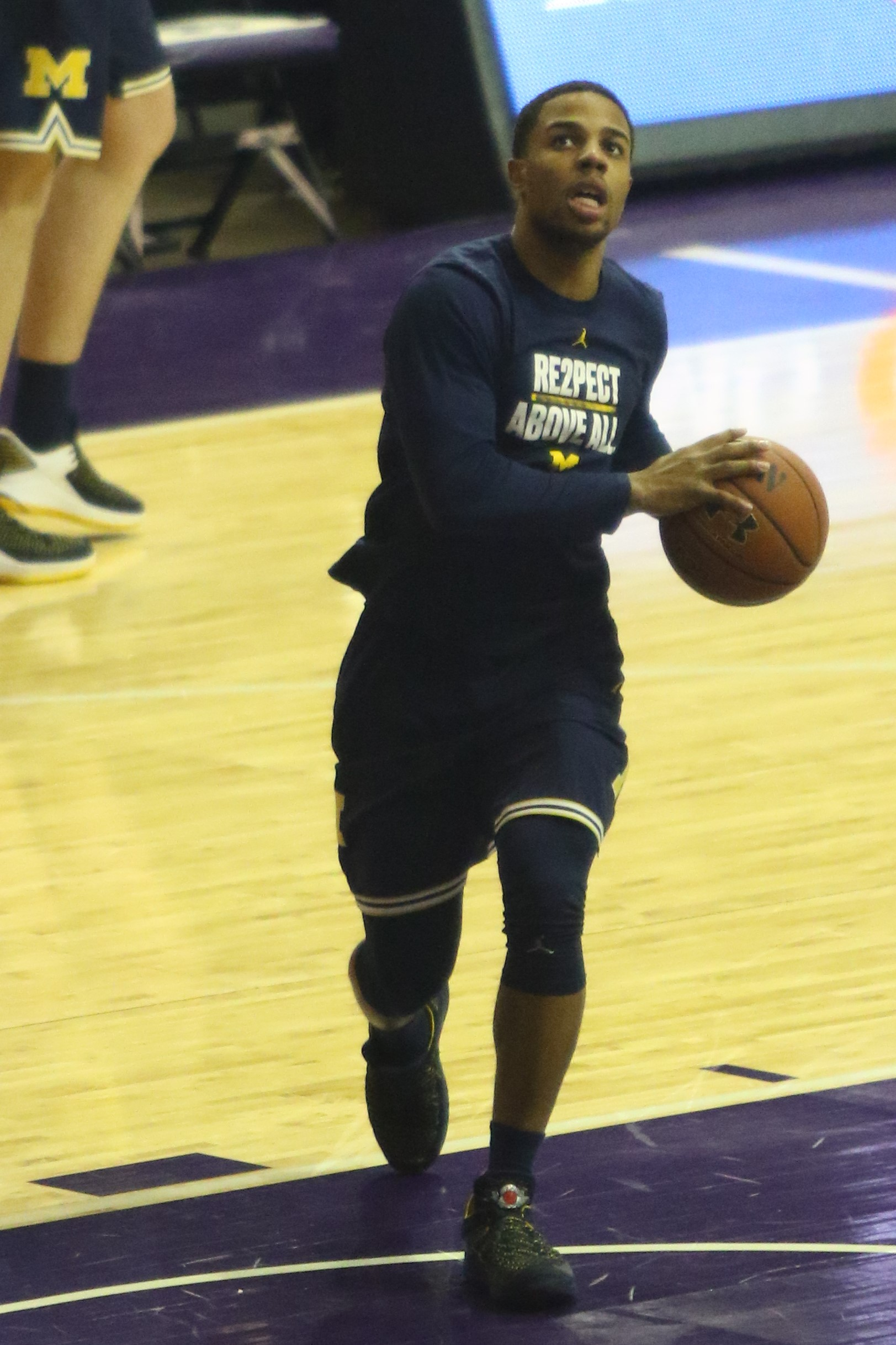
- Simmons with the 2017–18 Michigan Wolverines

Wright State Raiders
- Title: Assistant coach
- League: Horizon League

Personal information
- Born: April 8, 1995 (age 31) Dayton, Ohio, U.S.
- Listed height: 6 ft 1 in (1.85 m)
- Listed weight: 185 lb (84 kg)

Career information
- High school: Archbishop Alter (Kettering, Ohio)
- College: Houston (2013–2014); Ohio (2015–2017); Michigan (2017–2018)
- NBA draft: 2018: undrafted
- Playing career: 2018–2019
- Position: Point guard / shooting guard
- Coaching career: 2019–present

Career history
- 2018–2019: Union Neuchâtel

Career highlights
- First-team All-MAC (2018); Second-team All-MAC (2017)

Jaaron Romero Simmons (born April 8, 1995) is an American former professional basketball player. He was a standout player at Archbishop Alter High School in Kettering, Ohio, leaving as its all-time leading scorer and guiding his team to a Division II state semifinals appearance as a senior in 2013. He was also named Ohio Player of the Year after averaging 24 points, 3 rebounds, and 4 assists in his final high school season. He is the Ohio Bobcats all time leader in single-season and single game assists.

== College career ==
Simmons began his college career with Houston, choosing to play for the Cougars over several mid-major programs. He sat out for the 2014–15 season to transfer to Ohio, for whom he had an immediate impact, earning second-team and first-team All-Mid-American Conference (MAC) honors in 2017 and 2018, respectively. As a junior, he averaged 15.5 points and 7.9 assists per game, third in the nation. He transferred to Michigan for his senior campaign because he wanted to reach the NCAA Tournament. However, he received little playing time throughout the season with the national runner-up 2017–18 team playing as a backup point guard to Zavier Simpson.

== Professional career ==
On June 25, 2018, Simmons signed his first professional contract with Union Neuchâtel in Switzerland.

== Coaching career ==
In 2019, Simmons returned to Michigan to become a graduate manager of the basketball team. He was promoted to the position of video analyst in 2020. After five years on staff at Michigan, he was hired as an assistant coach for the Wright State Raiders men's basketball Team.

== See also ==
- Ohio Bobcats men's basketball statistical leaders
