= 1958–59 Ohio Bobcats men's basketball team =

American college basketball season

1958–59 Ohio Bobcats men's basketball
- Conference: Mid-American Conference
- Record: 14–10 (6–6 MAC)
- Head coach: Jim Snyder (10th season)
- Home arena: Men's Gymnasium

1958–59 Mid-American Conference men's basketball standings
	Conf.				Overall
Team	W		L	PCT	W		L	PCT
Bowling Green State	9	–	3	.750	18	–	8	.692
Miami (Ohio)	9	–	3	.750	14	–	11	.560
Ohio	6	–	6	.500	14	–	10	.583
Marshall	6	–	6	.500	12	–	12	.500
Kent State	6	–	6	.500	11	–	13	.458
Toledo	5	–	7	.417	11	–	13	.458
Western Michigan	1	–	11	.083	2	–	20	.091
Rankings from AP Poll

The 1958–59 Ohio Bobcats men's basketball team represented Ohio University as a member of the Mid-American Conference in the college basketball season of 1958–59. The team was coached by Jim Snyder and played their home games at the Men's Gymnasium. The Bobcats finished the regular season with a record of 14–10 and finished third in the MAC regular season with a conference record of 6–6.

== Schedule ==
Date time, TV	Rank^{#}	Opponent^{#}	Result	Record	Site (attendance) city, state
Regular Season
12/4/1958*		Marietta	W 86–53	1–0	
12/6/1958*		Chareleston (WV)	W 118–69	2–0	
12/13/1958*		Southern Illinois	W 101–83	3–0	
12/15/1958*		at Morehead State	L 73–75	3–1	
12/18/1958*		at Niagara	L 65–72	3–2	
12/20/1958*		at Cornell	W 58–54 ^{OT}	4–2	
12/29/1958*		vs. Middle Tennessee Statel; All-American City Tournament	W 77–66	5–2	
12/30/1958*		vs. Utah State; All-American City Tournament	W 80–72	6–2	
1/3/1959*		at Wittenberg	L 44–45	6–3	
MAC regular season
1/7/1959		at Marshall	W 88–84	7–3 (1–0)	
1/10/1959		at Kent State	L 58–73	7–4 (1–1)	
1/13/1959		at Miami (OH)	L 54–56 ^{OT}	7–5 (1–2)	
1/16/1959		Western Michigan	W 83–61	8–5 (2–2)	
1/24/1959*		Morehead State	W 88–77	9–5	
1/26/1959		Kent State	W 87–68	10–-5 (3–2)	
1/31/1959		at Western Michigan	W 85–69	11–-5 (4–2)	
2/2/1959		at Toledo	L 67–79 ^{OT}	11–6 (4–3)	
2/11/1959		Marshall	L 73–74	11–7 (4–4)	
2/14/1959		Bowling Green	W 89–67	12–7 (5–4)	
2/16/1959		Toledo	W 67–56	13–7 (6–4)	
2/21/1959		at Bowling Green	L 67–80	13–8 (6–5)	
2/24/1959		Miami (OH)	L 71–84	13–9 (6–6)	
2/28/1959*		at Louisville	L 70–72	13–10	
3/2/1959*		at Marietta	W 112–92	14–10	
*Non-conference game. ^{#}Rankings from AP Poll. (#) Tournament seedings in parentheses. All times are in Eastern Time.

== Statistics ==
=== Team statistics ===
Final 1958–59 statistics

Record	Ohio	OPP
Scoring	1861	1681
Scoring Average	77.54	70.04
Field goals – Att	728–1713	655–1667
Free throws – Att	405–636	371–557
Rebounds	1385	1020
Assists		
Turnovers		
Steals		
Blocked Shots		

=== Player statistics ===
			Minutes		Scoring		Total FGs			Free-Throws			Rebounds						
Player	GP	GS	Tot	Avg	Pts	Avg	FG	FGA	Pct	FT	FTA	Pct	Tot	Avg	A	PF	TO	Stl	Blk
Bunk Adams	24	-			347	14.5	135	321	0.421	77	146	0.527	272	11.3		49			
Jerry Wolf	24	-			315	13.1	128	281	0.456	59	97	0.608	199	8.3		60			
Dave Scott	24	-			302	12.6	120	277	0.433	62	90	0.689	319	13.3		71			
Bob Anderson	24	-			298	12.4	114	274	0.416	70	99	0.707	96	4.0		62			
Dick Norman	24	-			213	8.9	85	195	0.436	43	54	0.796	75	3.1		30			
Dale Bandy	21	-			136	6.5	42			52									
_ Johnson	21	-			85	4.0	38			9									
Howie Jolliff	7	-			56	8.0	24			8									
Bob Gaunt	18	-			47	2.6	18			11									
Total	24	-	-	-	1861	77.5	728	1713	0.425	405	636	0.637	1385	57.7		409			
Opponents	24	-	-	-	1681	70.0	655	1667	0.393	371	557	0.666	1020	42.5		443			

Legend
GP	Games played	GS	Games started	Avg	Average per game
FG	Field-goals made	FGA	Field-goal attempts	Off	Offensive rebounds
Def	Defensive rebounds	A	Assists	TO	Turnovers
Blk	Blocks	Stl	Steals	High	Team high
