= Holy Cross High School (Covington, Kentucky) =

Location
- 3617 Church Street; Covington, (Kenton County), Kentucky 41015; United States
- 39°2′54″N 84°30′6″W

Information
- Type: Private, Coeducational
- Religious affiliation: Roman Catholic
- Established: 1921
- Principal: Rob Knox
- Teaching staff: 38
- Grades: 9–12
- Average class size: 18.7 students
- Colors: Red and Black
- Slogan: "A Size For All"
- Sports: basketball, Football, Soccer.
- Team name: Indians
- Newspaper: The Tribe Tribune
- Website: www.hchscov.com

Holy Cross High School is a private, Roman Catholic high school in Covington, Kentucky. It is located in the Roman Catholic Diocese of Covington. The mascot is the Indians. The current principal is Rob Knox.

== Background ==
Holy Cross High School was established in 1891. It has two buildings: The first, the "Old Building", was built in 1891, while the other, the "New Building", was built in 1961. The school is known for its academic enhancement program, which features courses focused on assisting students who have difficulty in core subjects. The school also offers a variety of programs to assist families requiring financial assistance.

== Extracurricular activities ==
Holy Cross High School offers a wide range of activities for students. It is perhaps best known for its Y-Club, which facilitates participation in the Kentucky Youth Assembly and Kentucky United Nations Assembly, the two statewide mock government conferences facilitated by the Kentucky YMCA. Since its founding in 2012, the Holy Cross Y-Club has produced a chief justice (in the Kentucky Youth Assembly), a president of the Senate (in the Kentucky Youth Assembly), and two secretaries-general (in the Kentucky United Nations Assembly). Approximately 1/3 of the school attends each conference. Teams of 15 students are chosen to attend one international mock government conference per year, typically hosted by a premier university. Students are selected based on achievement in the statewide conferences, and past competitions have included the Harvard Model United Nations and Harvard Model Congress San Francisco.

Other popular activities include art club, football, soccer, basketball, volleyball, golf, bowling, softball, track and field, cross country, swimming, intramural basketball, tennis, academic team, school paper, drama club, choir, Students Against Destructive Decisions (SADD), rosary club, and baseball. Among the major sports, soccer, basketball and volleyball have won the Kentucky "All-A Tournament" in recent years. The school has won two state sanctioned State Championships by the football team in 2011, and in 2015 the girls' basketball team won State and the All "A" Classic ending the year #25 in the US.
