= 2016–17 Northern Illinois Huskies men's basketball team =

American college basketball season

2016–17 Northern Illinois Huskies men's basketball
- Conference: Mid-American Conference
- West Division
- Record: 15–17 (7–11 MAC)
- Head coach: Mark Montgomery (6th season)
- Assistant coaches: Jon Borovich; Lou Dawkins; Jason Larson
- Home arena: Convocation Center

2016–17 Mid-American Conference men's basketball standings
	Conf.				Overall
Team	W		L	PCT	W		L	PCT
East
Akron	14	–	4	.778	27	–	9	.750
Ohio	11	–	7	.611	20	–	11	.645
Buffalo	11	–	7	.611	17	–	15	.531
Kent State †	10	–	8	.556	22	–	14	.611
Bowling Green	7	–	11	.389	13	–	19	.406
Miami (OH)	4	–	14	.222	11	–	21	.344
West
Ball State	11	–	7	.611	21	–	13	.618
Western Michigan	11	–	7	.611	16	–	16	.500
Toledo	9	–	9	.500	17	–	17	.500
Eastern Michigan	7	–	11	.389	16	–	17	.485
Northern Illinois	7	–	11	.389	15	–	17	.469
Central Michigan	6	–	12	.333	16	–	16	.500
† 2017 MAC tournament winner

The 2016–17 Northern Illinois Huskies men's basketball team represented Northern Illinois University during the 2016–17 NCAA Division I men's basketball season. The Huskies, led by sixth-year head coach Mark Montgomery, played their home games at the Convocation Center in DeKalb, Illinois as members of the West Division of the Mid-American Conference. They finished the season 15–17, 7–11 in MAC play to finish in a tie for eighth place. As the No. 9 seed in the MAC tournament, they lost in the first round to Eastern Michigan.

== Previous season ==
The Huskies finished the 2015–16 season 21–13, 9–9 in MAC play to finish in a tie for third place in the West Division. They defeated Western Michigan in the first round of the MAC tournament before losing to Ohio in the quarterfinals. They received an invitation to the inaugural Vegas 16, which only had eight teams, and lost in the quarterfinals to UC Santa Barbara.

== Preseason ==
Northern Illinois was picked to finish in third place in the West Division in the MAC preseason poll. Marin Maric was selected to the West Division All-MAC preseason team.

== Departures ==
Name	Number	Pos.	Height	Weight	Year	Hometown	Notes
Travon Baker	5	G	5'10"	170	Senior	Detroit, MI	Graduated
Darrell Bowie	10	G/F	6'7"	220	Senior	Milwaukee, WI	Graduated
Chuks Iroegbu	11	G/F	6'4"	210	RS Senior	Elk Grove, CA	Graduated
Jordan Thomas	12	G	5'11"	185	Sophomore	Northfield, IL	Walk-on; left the team for personal reasons
Michael Orris	24	G	6'2"	200	RS Junior	Crete, IL	Graduate transferred to South Dakota State
Jay DeHaan	25	G	6'2"	185	Sophomore	Naperville, IL	Walk-on; transferred to UW–Parkside

=== Incoming transfers ===
Name	Number	Pos.	Height	Weight	Year	Hometown	Previous School
Lacey James	4	F	6'9"	220	Sophomore	Grand Rapids, MI	Transferred from Rider. Under NCAA transfer rules, James will have to sit out for the 2016–17 season. Will have three years of remaining eligibility. Will join the team as a preferred walk-on.
Sean Damaska	21	C	6'7"	252	RS Senior	Milton, GA	Transferred from Indiana. Will be eligible to play immediately since Damaska graduated from Indiana. Will join the team as a preferred walk-on.

== Recruiting class of 2016 ==
College recruiting information
Name	Hometown	School	Height	Weight	Commit date
Eugene German; PG	Gary, IN	21st Century Charter School	6 ft 1 in (1.85 m)	150 lb (68 kg)	Jun 21, 2015
Eugene German; PG	Recruit ratings: Scout: Rivals: (NR)				
Noah McCarty; PF	Sterling, IL	Newman Central Catholic High School	6 ft 8 in (2.03 m)	220 lb (100 kg)	Aug 9, 2015
Noah McCarty; PF	Recruit ratings: Scout: Rivals: (NR)				
Nick Wagner; PG	Galesville, WI	Gale-Ettrick-Trempealeau High School	6 ft 3 in (1.91 m)	180 lb (82 kg)	Sep 6, 2015
Nick Wagner; PG	Recruit ratings: Scout: Rivals: (NR)				
Overall recruit ranking:
Note: In many cases, Scout, Rivals, 247Sports, On3, and ESPN may conflict in their listings of height and weight.; In these cases, the average was taken. ESPN grades are on a 100-point scale.; Sources: "2016 Team Ranking". Rivals.

=== Recruiting class of 2017 ===
College recruiting information (2017)
Name	Hometown	School	Height	Weight	Commit date
Owen Hamilton #37 C	Prescott, WI	Prescott High School	6 ft 11 in (2.11 m)	245 lb (111 kg)	Sep 18, 2016
Owen Hamilton #37 C	Recruit ratings: Scout: Rivals: (NR)				
Overall recruit ranking:
Note: In many cases, Scout, Rivals, 247Sports, On3, and ESPN may conflict in their listings of height and weight.; In these cases, the average was taken. ESPN grades are on a 100-point scale.; Sources: "2017 Team Ranking". Rivals.

== Roster ==
2016–17 Northern Illinois Huskies men's basketball team
Players
Coaches

Pos.	#	Name	Height	Weight	Year	Previous school	Hometown
G	0	Marshawn Wilson	6 ft 3 in (1.91 m)	205 lb (93 kg)	So	Hill-Murray	Oakdale, MN
G	2	Laytwan Porter	6 ft 2 in (1.88 m)	185 lb (84 kg)	So	Auburn	Rockford, IL
G	3	Dontel Highsmith	6 ft 2 in (1.88 m)	200 lb (91 kg)	Sr	Dowagiac	Dowagiac, MI
F	4	Lacey James (I, W) (redshirt)	6 ft 9 in (2.06 m)	230 lb (104 kg)	So	Wayland Union; Rider	Grand Rapids, MI
G	5	Justin Thomas	5 ft 11 in (1.8 m)	180 lb (82 kg)	Fr	Pike	Indianapolis, IN
G	10	Eugene German	6 ft 0 in (1.83 m)	165 lb (75 kg)	Fr	21st Century Charter	Gary, IN
F	11	Noah McCarthy	6 ft 7 in (2.01 m)	210 lb (95 kg)	Fr	Sterling Newman	Rock Falls, IL
F	15	Jaylen Key	6 ft 8 in (2.03 m)	220 lb (100 kg)	So	Homestead	Mequon, WI
C	21	Sean Damaska (W)	6 ft 7 in (2.01 m)	252 lb (114 kg)	RS Sr	Bleesed Trinity Catholic; Indiana	Milton, GA
G	23	Aaric Armstead	6 ft 5 in (1.96 m)	195 lb (88 kg)	Sr	La Jolla Prep	Chicago, IL
G	30	Nick Wagner	6 ft 3 in (1.91 m)	190 lb (86 kg)	Fr	Gale-Ettrick-Trempealeau	Galesville, WI
G	31	Austin Pauga	6 ft 6 in (1.98 m)	210 lb (95 kg)	So	IMG Academy	Naperville, IL
C	32	Andrew Zelis	7 ft 0 in (2.13 m)	255 lb (116 kg)	Sr	Wheaton North; Kaskaskia College	Wheaton, IL
G	33	Jon Siu (W)	6 ft 5 in (1.96 m)	255 lb (116 kg)	So	Middlesex School	Hong Kong
C	34	Marin Maric	6 ft 10 in (2.08 m)	250 lb (113 kg)	Sr	La Lumiere School	Split, Croatia
G/F	42	Levi Bradley	6 ft 7 in (2.01 m)	200 lb (91 kg)	So	Pius XI	Milwaukee, WI

Head coach

- Mark Montgomery (Michigan State)

Assistant coach(es)

- Jon Borovich (Central Michigan)
- Lou Dawkins (Tulsa)
- Jason Larson (Grand Valley State)

Legend

- (C) Team captain
- (S) Suspended
- (I) Ineligible
- (W) Walk-on
- Injured
- Current redshirt

Roster

== Schedule and results ==
Date time, TV	Rank^{#}	Opponent^{#}	Result	Record	Site (attendance) city, state
Non-conference regular season
11/11/2016*; 7:00 PM, ESPN3		Indiana State	W 80–78 ^{OT}	1–0	Convocation Center (1,565); DeKalb, IL
11/14/2016*; 7:00 PM		Roosevelt	W 99–55	2–0	Convocation Center (756); DeKalb, IL
11/16/2016*; 8:00 PM, ESPN3		Idaho	W 63–49	3–0	Convocation Center (1,430); DeKalb, IL
11/19/2016*; 10:00 PM		at Cal State Northridge	L 82–84	3–1	Matadome (886); Northridge, CA
11/23/2016*; 7:00 PM, ESPN3		Cal Poly; NIU Thanksgiving Classic	L 64–68	3–2	Convocation Center (844); DeKalb, IL
11/25/2016*; 1:00 PM		Elon; NIU Thanksgiving Classic	L 80–85 ^{2OT}	3–3	Convocation Center; DeKalb, IL
11/26/2016*; 3:30 PM		UIC; NIU Thanksgiving Classic	W 92–81	4–3	Convocation Center; DeKalb, IL
11/30/2016*; 7:00 PM, ESPN3		at Indiana State	L 52–63	4–4	Hulman Center (3,730); Terre Haute, IN
12/11/2016*; 4:00 PM, BTN		at Minnesota	L 57–77	4–5	Williams Arena (8,625); Minneapolis, MN
12/14/2016*; 7:00 PM		Olivet Nazarene	W 95–69	5–5	Convocation Center (523); DeKalb, IL
12/17/2016*; 6:00 PM		at FIU	W 60–53	6–5	FIU Arena (810); Miami, FL
12/20/2016*; 7:00 PM, ESPN3		at South Florida	W 59–48	7–5	USF Sun Dome (2,129); Tampa, FL
12/31/2016*; 3:30 PM		Illinois–Springfield	W 77–62	8–5	Convocation Center (1,083); DeKalb, IL
MAC regular season
01/03/2017; 6:00 PM, ESPN3		at Miami (OH)	L 67–69	8–6 (0–1)	Millett Hall (1,151); Oxford, OH
01/07/2017; 3:30 PM		Central Michigan	W 87–83	9–6 (1–1)	Convocation Center (1,717); DeKalb, IL
01/10/2017; 6:00 PM		at Kent State	W 74–70	10–6 (2–1)	MAC Center (2,033); Kent, OH
01/14/2017; 11:00 AM, ESPN3		at Bowling Green	W 69–52	11–6 (3–1)	Stroh Center; Bowling Green, OH
01/17/2017; 7:00 PM, ESPN3		Miami (OH)	W 62–58	12–6 (4–1)	Convocation Center (1,053); DeKalb, IL
01/21/2017; 7:00 PM, ESPN3		Ohio	L 69–78	12–7 (4–2)	Convocation Center (2,167); DeKalb, IL
01/24/2017; 7:00 PM, ESPN3		Kent State	L 66–73	12–8 (4–3)	Convocation Center (868); DeKalb, IL
01/28/2017; 6:00 PM, ESPN3		at Toledo	W 74–72	13–8 (5–3)	Savage Arena (4,864); Toledo, OH
01/31/2017; 7:00 PM, ESPN3		Akron	L 73–76	13–9 (5–4)	Convocation Center (1,042); DeKalb, IL
02/04/2017; 3:30 PM, ESPN3		Eastern Michigan	W 81–69	14–9 (6–4)	Convocation Center (2,443); DeKalb, IL
02/07/2017; 6:00 PM, ESPN3		at Buffalo	L 45–65	14–10 (6–5)	Alumni Arena (3,212); Amherst, NY
02/11/2017; 6:00 PM, ESPN3		at Western Michigan	L 67–76	14–11 (6–6)	University Arena (3,140); Kalamazoo, MI
02/14/2017; 7:00 PM, ESPN3		Ball State	L 72–81	14–12 (6–7)	Convocation Center (759); DeKalb, IL
02/18/2017; 3:30 PM, ESPN3		Toledo	L 80–88 ^{OT}	14–13 (6–8)	Convocation Center (2,007); DeKalb, IL
02/21/2017; 6:00 PM, ESPN3		at Central Michigan	W 89–66	15–13 (7–8)	McGuirk Arena (2,531); Mount Pleasant, MI
02/25/2017; 11:00 AM, ESPN3		at Eastern Michigan	L 68–84	15–14 (7–9)	Convocation Center (1,115); Ypsilanti, MI
02/28/2017; 7:00 PM, ESPN3		Western Michigan	L 56–70	15–15 (7–10)	Convocation Center (862); DeKalb, IL
03/03/2017; 6:00 PM, ESPN3		at Ball State	L 82–87	15–16 (7–11)	Worthen Arena (4,457); Muncie, IN
MAC tournament
03/06/2017; 7:00 pm, ESPN3	(9)	at (8) Eastern Michigan first round	L 69–72	15–17	Convocation Center (981); Ypsilanti, MI
*Non-conference game. ^{#}Rankings from AP Poll. (#) Tournament seedings in parentheses. All times are in Eastern Time.

== See also ==
- 2016–17 Northern Illinois Huskies women's basketball team
