= 2015–16 Mid-American Conference men's basketball season =

- League: NCAA Division I
- Sport: Basketball
- Teams: 12

Regular season
- League champions: Akron
- Runners-up: Ohio
- Season MVP: Antonio Campbell

Tournament
- Champions: Buffalo
- Runners-up: Akron
- Finals MVP: Willie Conner

Mid-American men's basketball seasons
- ← 2014–15 2016–17 →

2015–16 Mid-American Conference men's basketball standings
	Conf.				Overall
Team	W		L	PCT	W		L	PCT
East
Akron	13	–	5	.722	26	–	9	.743
Ohio	11	–	7	.611	23	–	12	.657
Kent State	10	–	8	.556	19	–	13	.594
Buffalo †	10	–	8	.556	20	–	15	.571
Miami (OH)	6	–	12	.333	13	–	20	.394
Bowling Green	5	–	13	.278	16	–	18	.471
West
Ball State	10	–	8	.556	21	–	14	.600
Central Michigan	10	–	8	.556	17	–	16	.515
Northern Illinois	9	–	9	.500	21	–	13	.618
Eastern Michigan	9	–	9	.500	18	–	15	.545
Toledo	8	–	10	.444	17	–	15	.531
Western Michigan	7	–	11	.389	13	–	19	.406
† 2016 MAC tournament winner

The 2015–16 Mid-American Conference men's basketball season began with practices in October 2015, followed by the start of the 2015–16 NCAA Division I men's basketball season in November. Conference play began in January 2016 and concluded in March 2016. Akron won the regular season title with a conference record of 13–5 over second place Ohio. Third-seeded Buffalo defeated Akron in the MAC tournament final and represented the MAC in the NCAA tournament where they lost to Miami (FL) in the first round.

== Preseason awards ==
The preseason poll and league awards were announced by the league office on October 28, 2015.

=== Preseason men's basketball poll ===
(First place votes in parentheses)

==== East Division ====
1. Akron 132 (17)
2. Kent State 116 (5)
3. Ohio 69
4. Buffalo 64 (1)
5. Miami 60
6. Bowling Green 42

==== West Division ====
1. Central Michigan 138 (23)
2. Toledo 110
3. Western Michigan 94
4. Eastern Michigan 71
5. Northern Illinois 37
6. Ball State 33

==== Tournament champs ====
Central Michigan (15), Akron (6), Buffalo (1), Kent State (1)

=== Honors ===
Honor	Recipient
Preseason All-MAC East	Pat Forsythe, Sr., C, Akron
Preseason All-MAC East	Lamonte Bearden, So., G, Buffalo
Preseason All-MAC East	Jimmy Hall, R-Jr., F, Kent State
Preseason All-MAC East	Eric Washington, Sr., G, Miami
Preseason All-MAC East	Antonio Campbell, Jr., F, Ohio
Preseason All-MAC West	Chris Fowler, Sr., G, Central Michigan
Preseason All-MAC West	John Simons, Sr., F, Central Michigan
Preseason All-MAC West	Raven Lee, R-Jr., G, Eastern Michigan
Preseason All-MAC West	Nathan Boothe, Sr., C, Toledo
Preseason All-MAC West	Connar Tava, Sr., F, Western Michigan

== Postseason ==
=== Postseason awards ===
1. Coach of the Year: Keith Dambrot, Akron
2. Player of the Year: Antonio Campbell, Ohio
3. Freshman of the Year: James Thompson IV, Eastern Michigan
4. Defensive Player of the Year: Khaliq Spicer, Kent State
5. Sixth Man of the Year: Isaiah Johnson, Akron

=== Honors ===
Honor	Recipient
Postseason All-MAC First Team	Isaiah Johnson, C, Akron
Postseason All-MAC First Team	Chris Fowler, G, Central Michigan
Postseason All-MAC First Team	Jimmy Hall, F, Kent State
Postseason All-MAC First Team	Antonio Campbell, C, Ohio
Postseason All-MAC First Team	Nathan Boothe, F/C, Toledo
Postseason All-MAC Second Team	Reggie McAdams, F, Akron
Postseason All-MAC Second Team	Franko House, F, Ball State
Postseason All-MAC Second Team	James Thompson IV, C, Eastern Michigan
Postseason All-MAC Second Team	Jaaron Simmons, G, Ohio
Postseason All-MAC Second Team	Thomas Wilder, G, Western Michigan
Postseason All-MAC Third Team	Lamonte Bearden, G, Buffalo
Postseason All-MAC Third Team	Blake Hamilton, W, Buffalo
Postseason All-MAC Third Team	Braylon Rayson, G, Central Michigan
Postseason All-MAC Third Team	Marin Maric, C, Northern Illinois
Postseason All-MAC Third Team	Jonathan Williams, G, Toledo
Postseason All-MAC Honorable Mention	Antino Jackson, G, Akron
Postseason All-MAC Honorable Mention	Spencer Parker, F, Bowling Green
Postseason All-MAC Honorable Mention	Raven Lee, G, Eastern Michigan
Postseason All-MAC Honorable Mention	Eric Washington, G, Miami
Postseason All-MAC Honorable Mention	Geovonie McKnight, G, Miami
All-MAC Freshman Team	Josh Williams, G, Akron
All-MAC Freshman Team	CJ Massinburg, G, Buffalo
All-MAC Freshman Team	James Thompson IV, C, Eastern Michigan
All-MAC Freshman Team	Marshawn Wilson, G, Northern Illinois
All-MAC Freshman Team	Jordan Dartis, G, Ohio
All-MAC Defensive Team	Franko House, F, Ball State
All-MAC Defensive Team	Willie Conner, W, Buffalo
All-MAC Defensive Team	Tim Bond, F, Eastern Michigan
All-MAC Defensive Team	Khaliq Spicer, C, Kent State
All-MAC Defensive Team	Aaric Armstead, G, Northern Illinois

== See also ==
2015–16 Mid-American Conference women's basketball season
