= 2016–17 Mid-American Conference men's basketball season =

- League: NCAA Division I
- Sport: Basketball
- Teams: 12

Regular season
- League champions: Akron
- Season MVP: Isaiah Johnson

Tournament
- Champions: Kent State
- Runners-up: Akron
- Finals MVP: Jaylin Walker

Mid-American men's basketball seasons
- ← 2015–16 2017–18 →

2016–17 Mid-American Conference men's basketball standings
	Conf.				Overall
Team	W		L	PCT	W		L	PCT
East
Akron	14	–	4	.778	27	–	9	.750
Ohio	11	–	7	.611	20	–	11	.645
Buffalo	11	–	7	.611	17	–	15	.531
Kent State †	10	–	8	.556	22	–	14	.611
Bowling Green	7	–	11	.389	13	–	19	.406
Miami (OH)	4	–	14	.222	11	–	21	.344
West
Ball State	11	–	7	.611	21	–	13	.618
Western Michigan	11	–	7	.611	16	–	16	.500
Toledo	9	–	9	.500	17	–	17	.500
Eastern Michigan	7	–	11	.389	16	–	17	.485
Northern Illinois	7	–	11	.389	15	–	17	.469
Central Michigan	6	–	12	.333	16	–	16	.500
† 2017 MAC tournament winner

The 2016–17 Mid-American Conference men's basketball season began with practices in October 2016, followed by the start of the 2016–17 NCAA Division I men's basketball season in November. Conference play began in January 2017 and concluded in March 2017. Akron won the regular season title with a conference record of 14–4 over a cluster of four teams tied at 11–7. Sixth-seeded Kent State upset Akron in the MAC tournament final and represented the MAC in the NCAA tournament where they lost to UCLA in the first round.

== Preseason awards ==
The preseason poll and league awards were announced by the league office on October 28, 2016.

=== Preseason men's basketball poll ===
(First place votes in parentheses)

==== East Division ====
1. Akron 194 (15)
2. Ohio 190 (16)
3. Buffalo 144 (5)
4. Kent State 116
5. Bowling Green 63
6. Miami 49

==== West Division ====
1. Eastern Michigan 178 (16)
2. Ball State 158 (12)
3. Northern Illinois 148 (5)
4. Toledo 100 (1)
5. Western Michigan 95
6. Central Michigan 77 (2)

==== Tournament champs ====
Akron (15), Ohio (11), Eastern Michigan (3), Buffalo (2), NIU (2), Central Michigan (1), Kent State (1), Miami (1).

=== Honors ===
Honor	Recipient
Preseason All-MAC East	Isaiah Johnson, Sr., C, Akron
Preseason All-MAC East	Blake Hamilton, Sr., W, Buffalo
Preseason All-MAC East	Jimmy Hall, Sr., F, Kent State
Preseason All-MAC East	Antonio Campbell, Sr., F, Ohio
Preseason All-MAC East	Jaaron Simmons, Jr., G, Ohio
Preseason All-MAC West	Franko House, Sr., F, Ball State
Preseason All-MAC West	James Thompson IV, So., F/C, Eastern Michigan
Preseason All-MAC West	Marin Maric, Sr., C, Northern Illinois
Preseason All-MAC West	Jonathan Williams, Sr., G, Toledo
Preseason All-MAC West	Thomas Wilder, Jr., G, Western Michigan

== Postseason ==
=== Postseason awards ===
1. Coach of the Year: Keith Dambrot, Akron
2. Player of the Year: Isaiah Johnson, Akron
3. Freshman of the Year: Michael Weathers, Miami
4. Defensive Player of the Year: Dontay Caruthers, Buffalo
5. Sixth Man of the Year: Nick Perkins, Buffalo

=== Honors ===
Honor	Recipient
Postseason All-MAC First Team	Isaiah Johnson, C, Akron, Senior
Postseason All-MAC First Team	Marcus Keene, G, Central Michigan, Junior
Postseason All-MAC First Team	Jimmy Hall, F, Kent State, Senior
Postseason All-MAC First Team	Jaaron Simmons, G, Ohio, Junior
Postseason All-MAC First Team	Thomas Wilder, G, Western Michigan, Senior
Postseason All-MAC Second Team	Kwan Cheatham Jr., F, Akron, Senior
Postseason All-MAC Second Team	Tayler Persons, G, Ball State, Sophomore
Postseason All-MAC Second Team	Blake Hamilton, Wing, Buffalo, Senior
Postseason All-MAC Second Team	James Thompson IV, F, Eastern Michigan, Sophomore
Postseason All-MAC Second Team	Steve Taylor Jr., F, Toledo, Senior
Postseason All-MAC Third Team	Franko House, F, Ball State, Senior
Postseason All-MAC Third Team	Braylon Rayson, G, Central Michigan, Senior
Postseason All-MAC Third Team	Marin Maric, C, Northern Illinois, Senior
Postseason All-MAC Third Team	Jonathan Williams, G, Toledo, Senior
Postseason All-MAC Third Team	Tucker Haymond, F, Western Michigan, Senior
Postseason All-MAC Honorable Mention	Antino Jackson, G, Akron, Junior
Postseason All-MAC Honorable Mention	Zack Denny, G, Bowling Green, Senior
Postseason All-MAC Honorable Mention	C.J. Massinburg, G, Buffalo, Sophomore
Postseason All-MAC Honorable Mention	Michael Weathers, G, Miami, Freshman
Postseason All-MAC Honorable Mention	Jordan Dartis, G, Ohio, Sophomore
All-MAC Freshman Team	Michael Weathers, G, Miami
All-MAC Freshman Team	Jason Carter, F, Ohio
All-MAC Freshman Team	Reggie Jones, G, Western Michigan
All-MAC Freshman Team	Dylan Frye, G, Bowling Green
All-MAC Freshman Team	Eugene German, G, Northern Illinois
All-MAC Defensive Team	Trey Moses, C, Ball State, Sophomore
All-MAC Defensive Team	Zack Denny, G, Bowling Green, Senior
All-MAC Defensive Team	Dontay Caruthers, G, Buffalo, Sophomore
All-MAC Defensive Team	Tim Bond, G/F, Eastern Michigan, Junior
All-MAC Defensive Team	Deon Edwin, F, Kent State, Senior

== See also ==
2016–17 Mid-American Conference women's basketball season
