= 2016–17 Western Michigan Broncos men's basketball team =

American college basketball season

2016–17 Western Michigan Broncos men's basketball

MAC West Division co-champions
- Conference: Mid-American Conference
- West Division
- Record: 16–16 (11–7 MAC)
- Head coach: Steve Hawkins (14th season)
- Assistant coaches: Clayton Bates; Larry Farmer; James Holland
- Home arena: University Arena

2016–17 Mid-American Conference men's basketball standings
| | Conf. | | | | Overall |
| Team | W | | L | PCT | W | | L | PCT |
|---|---|---|---|---|---|---|---|---|
East
| Akron | 14 | – | 4 | .778 | 27 | – | 9 | .750 |
| Ohio | 11 | – | 7 | .611 | 20 | – | 11 | .645 |
| Buffalo | 11 | – | 7 | .611 | 17 | – | 15 | .531 |
| Kent State † | 10 | – | 8 | .556 | 22 | – | 14 | .611 |
| Bowling Green | 7 | – | 11 | .389 | 13 | – | 19 | .406 |
| Miami (OH) | 4 | – | 14 | .222 | 11 | – | 21 | .344 |
West
| Ball State | 11 | – | 7 | .611 | 21 | – | 13 | .618 |
| Western Michigan | 11 | – | 7 | .611 | 16 | – | 16 | .500 |
| Toledo | 9 | – | 9 | .500 | 17 | – | 17 | .500 |
| Eastern Michigan | 7 | – | 11 | .389 | 16 | – | 17 | .485 |
| Northern Illinois | 7 | – | 11 | .389 | 15 | – | 17 | .469 |
| Central Michigan | 6 | – | 12 | .333 | 16 | – | 16 | .500 |
† 2017 MAC tournament winner

The 2016–17 Western Michigan Broncos men's basketball team represented Western Michigan University during the 2016–17 NCAA Division I men's basketball season. The Broncos, led by 14th-year head coach Steve Hawkins, played their home games at University Arena as members of the West Division of the Mid-American Conference. They finished the season 16–16, 11–7 in MAC play to tie for first in the West Division. As the No. 5 seed in the MAC tournament, they lost in the quarterfinals of the conference tournament to Ball State. They declined invitations from both the CollegeInsider.com and College Basketball Invitational postseason tournaments.

== Previous season ==
The Broncos finished the 2015–16 season 13–19 overall and 7–11 in MAC play to finish in last place in the West Division. They lost in the first round of the MAC tournament to Northern Illinois. WMU tied Eastern Michigan for the Michigan MAC Trophy with a 3–1 record. However, due to not having a clear winner, Central Michigan retained the trophy that they won in 2014–15.

== Departures ==
| Name | Position | Height | Weight | Year | Hometown | Notes |
|---|---|---|---|---|---|---|
| Anthony Avery | F | 6′ 7″ | 205 | Senior | Chicago, IL | Graduated |
| Khadim Dieng | C | 6′ 11″ | 200 | Sophomore | Senegal | Transferred to Davenport |
| Jared Klein | G | 6′ 2″ | 175 | Senior | Otsego, MI | Graduated |
| Kellen McCormick | F | 6′ 8″ | 215 | Junior (redshirt) | West Bloomfield, MI | Graduate transfer to Georgia Tech |
| Taylor Perry | G | 6′ 5″ | 200 | Senior | Rochester, MI | Graduated |
| Connar Tava | F | 6′ 6″ | 245 | Senior | Macomb, MI | Graduate transfer to Boston College |

== Recruiting class of 2016 ==
College recruiting information
| Name | Hometown | School | Height | Weight | Commit date |
|---|---|---|---|---|---|
| Reggie Jones; SF | Marion, IN | Marion High School | 6 ft 5 in (1.96 m) | 180 lb (82 kg) | |
| Reggie Jones; SF | Recruit ratings: Scout: Rivals: (73) | | | | |
| Jared Printy; SG | Marion, IA | Linn-Mar High School | 6 ft 5 in (1.96 m) | N/A | Sep 24, 2015 |
| Jared Printy; SG | Recruit ratings: Scout: Rivals: (NR) | | | | |
| Brandon Johnson; PF | Chicago, IL | Thornton Fractional South High School | 6 ft 8 in (2.03 m) | 200 lb (91 kg) | Oct 6, 2015 |
| Brandon Johnson; PF | Recruit ratings: Scout: Rivals: (NR) | | | | |
| Adida Ikongshul; SF | Madison, IN | Shawe Memorial High School | 6 ft 6 in (1.98 m) | N/A | |
| Adida Ikongshul; SF | Recruit ratings: Scout: Rivals: (NR) | | | | |
| Jarrin Randall; PG | Chicago, IL | Morgan Park High School | 6 ft 0 in (1.83 m) | 165 lb (75 kg) | Sep 6, 2015 |
| Jarrin Randall; PG | Recruit ratings: Scout: Rivals: (NR) | | | | |
Overall recruit ranking:
Note: In many cases, Scout, Rivals, 247Sports, On3, and ESPN may conflict in their listings of height and weight.; In these cases, the average was taken. ESPN grades are on a 100-point scale.; Sources: "2016 Western Michigan Basketball Commits". Rivals.; "2016 Western Michigan Basketball Commits". Scout.; "2016 Western Michigan Basketball Commits". ESPN.; "Scout.com Team Recruiting Rankings". Scout.; "2016 Team Ranking". Rivals.

=== Recruiting class of 2017 ===
College recruiting information (2017)
| Name | Hometown | School | Height | Weight | Commit date |
|---|---|---|---|---|---|
| T. J. Clifford; PF | Downers Grove, IL | Downers Grove South High School | 6 ft 6 in (1.98 m) | N/A | Jul 9, 2016 |
| T. J. Clifford; PF | Recruit ratings: Scout: Rivals: (NR) | | | | |
| Michael Flowers; PG | Southfield, MI | Southfield High School | 6 ft 2 in (1.88 m) | N/A | |
| Michael Flowers; PG | Recruit ratings: Scout: Rivals: (NR) | | | | |
Overall recruit ranking:
Note: In many cases, Scout, Rivals, 247Sports, On3, and ESPN may conflict in their listings of height and weight.; In these cases, the average was taken. ESPN grades are on a 100-point scale.; Sources: "2017 Western Michigan Basketball Commits". Rivals.; "2016 Western Michigan Basketball Commits". Scout.; "2016 Western Michigan Basketball Commits". ESPN.; "Scout.com Team Recruiting Rankings". Scout.; "2017 Team Ranking". Rivals.

== Season ==
On December 12, during the season, redshirt freshman guard Joeviair Kennedy was charged with murder and armed robbery in the killing of a WMU student.

== Roster ==
2016–17 Western Michigan Broncos men's basketball team
Players
Coaches

| Pos. | # | Name | Height | Weight | Year | Previous school | Hometown |
|---|---|---|---|---|---|---|---|
| G | 0 | Bryce Moore | 6 ft 2 in (1.88 m) | 196 lb (89 kg) | So | Park Tudor | Indianapolis, IN |
| G/F | 1 | Tucker Haymond | 6 ft 6 in (1.98 m) | 213 lb (97 kg) | Sr | Garfield | Seattle, WA |
| G/F | 2 | Joeviair Kennedy (S) | 6 ft 4 in (1.93 m) | 195 lb (88 kg) | RS Fr | Muskegon | Muskegon, MI |
| G/F | 3 | Josh Davis | 6 ft 5 in (1.96 m) | 175 lb (79 kg) | So | Henry J. Ford | Detroit, MI |
| G | 4 | Jared Printy | 6 ft 2 in (1.88 m) | 172 lb (78 kg) | Fr | Linn-Mar | Cedar Rapids, IA |
| G | 10 | Thomas Wilder | 6 ft 3 in (1.91 m) | 190 lb (86 kg) | Jr | Quakerdale Prep | Montgomery, IL |
| G | 11 | Ryan Wade (W) | 5 ft 9 in (1.75 m) | 175 lb (79 kg) | So | Laingsburg | Laingsburg, MI |
| G | 12 | Jarrin Randall | 5 ft 11 in (1.8 m) | 149 lb (68 kg) | Fr | Morgan Park | Chicago, IL |
| G/F | 13 | Brandon Allen (W) | 5 ft 10 in (1.78 m) | 156 lb (71 kg) | Fr | Haslett | East Lansing, MI |
| G/F | 23 | Reggie Jones | 6 ft 6 in (1.98 m) | 203 lb (92 kg) | Fr | Marion | Marion, IN |
| F | 24 | Adida Ikongshul | 6 ft 6 in (1.98 m) | 185 lb (84 kg) | Fr | Madison Consolidated | Nigeria |
| F | 35 | Brandon Johnson | 6 ft 8 in (2.03 m) | 203 lb (92 kg) | Fr | Thea Bowman Leadership Academy | Chicago, IL |
| C | 42 | Drake LaMont | 6 ft 10 in (2.08 m) | 240 lb (109 kg) | Jr | American Heritage | Plantation, FL |
| C | 50 | Seth Dugan | 7 ft 0 in (2.13 m) | 240 lb (109 kg) | So | Otsego | Otsego, MI |

Head coach

- Steve Hawkins (South Alabama)

Assistant coach(es)

- Clayton Bates (Florida)
- Larry Farmer (UCLA)
- James Holland (USC Upstate)

Legend

- (C) Team captain
- (S) Suspended
- (I) Ineligible
- (W) Walk-on
- Injured
- Current redshirt

Roster

== Schedule and results ==
The following table lists WMU's schedule.

| Date time, TV | Rank^{#} | Opponent^{#} | Result | Record | Site (attendance) city, state |
Exhibition game
| November 5, 2016*; 3:00 pm | | Kalamazoo | W 108–57 | | University Arena (1,696); Kalamazoo, MI |
Non-conference regular season
| November 11, 2016*; 7:00 pm, ESPN3 | | Marygrove | W 90–74 | 1–0 | University Arena (2,058); Kalamazoo, MI |
| November 14, 2016*; 7:00 pm, ESPN3 | | at Oakland | L 60–77 | 1–1 | Athletics Center O'rena (2,335); Rochester, MI |
| November 17, 2016*; 11:30 am, ESPN2 | | vs. No. 3 Villanova; Charleston Classic quarterfinals | L 65–76 | 1–2 | TD Arena (4,125); Charleston, SC |
| November 18, 2016*; 3:30 pm, ESPN3 | | vs. UTEP; Charleston Classic consolation round | L 75–85 | 1–3 | TD Arena (4,020); Charleston, SC |
| November 20, 2016*; 1:30 pm, ESPN3 | | vs. Boise State; Charleston Classic 7th place game | L 70–91 | 1–4 | TD Arena (1,293); Charleston, SC |
| November 26, 2016*; 2:00 pm, ESPN3 | | Central Arkansas | W 80–63 | 2–4 | University Arena (1,844); Kalamazoo, MI |
| November 30, 2016*; 7:00 pm, ESPN3 | | UNC Wilmington | L 92–97 | 2–5 | University Arena (1,823); Kalamazoo, MI |
| December 7, 2016*; 7:00 pm, ESPN3 | | vs. Cleveland State | L 62–85 | 2–6 | Quicken Loans Arena (1,313); Cleveland, OH |
| December 10, 2016*; 1:00 pm, ESPN3 | | James Madison | W 74–67 | 3–6 | University Arena (1,968); Kalamazoo, MI |
| December 18, 2016*; 8:00 pm, P12N | | at Washington | L 86–92 | 3–7 | Hec Edmundson Pavilion (7,129); Seattle, WA |
| December 21, 2016*; 11:00 pm, P12N | | at No. 2 UCLA | L 68–82 | 3–8 | Pauley Pavilion (10,695); Los Angeles, CA |
| December 29, 2016*; 7:00 pm, ESPN3 | | Alabama A&M | W 80–50 | 4–8 | University Arena (2,260); Kalamazoo, MI |
MAC regular season
| January 3, 2017; 7:00 pm, ESPN3 | | at Ohio | L 58–89 | 4–9 (0–1) | Convocation Center (4,616); Athens, OH |
| January 6, 2017; 6:30 pm | | at Akron | L 59–66 | 4–10 (0–2) | James A. Rhodes Arena (2,760); Akron, OH |
| January 10, 2017; 7:00 pm, ESPN3 | | Toledo | W 90–74 | 5–10 (1–2) | University Arena (1,879); Kalamazoo, MI |
| January 14, 2017; 2:00 pm, ESPN3 | | Kent State | W 92–88 | 6–10 (2–2) | University Arena (2,418); Kalamazoo, MI |
| January 17, 2017; 7:00 pm, ESPN3 | | at Eastern Michigan; Michigan MAC Trophy | L 80–86 | 6–11 (2–3) | Convocation Center (1,485); Ypsilanti, MI |
| January 21, 2017; 3:30 pm, ESPN3 | | at Buffalo | L 54–66 | 6–12 (2–4) | Alumni Arena (3,284); Amherst, NY |
| January 24, 2017; 7:00 pm, ESPN3 | | Akron | L 80–90 | 6–13 (2–5) | University Arena (2,079); Kalamazoo, MI |
| January 28, 2017; 1:00 pm, ESPN3 | | at Ball State | L 78–84 | 6–14 (2–6) | John E. Worthen Arena (4,298); Muncie, IN |
| January 31, 2017; 7:00 pm, ESPN3 | | Ohio | W 90–85 | 7–14 (3–6) | University Arena (1,806); Kalamazoo, MI |
| February 4, 2017; 4:30 pm, ESPN3 | | at Central Michigan; Michigan MAC Trophy | L 82–86 | 7–15 (3–7) | McGuirk Arena (5,412); Mount Pleasant, MI |
| February 7, 2017; 7:00 pm, ESPN3 | | at Miami (OH) | W 72–55 | 8–15 (4–7) | Millett Hall (3,061); Oxford, OH |
| February 11, 2017; 7:00 pm, ESPN3 | | Northern Illinois | W 76–67 | 9–15 (5–7) | University Arena (3,140); Kalamazoo, MI |
| February 14, 2017; 7:00 pm, ESPN3 | | Bowling Green | W 89–79 | 10–15 (6–7) | University Arena (1,763); Kalamazoo, MI |
| February 18, 2017; 4:00 pm, ESPN3 | | Eastern Michigan; Michigan MAC Trophy | W 88–80 | 11–15 (7–7) | University Arena; Kalamazoo, MI |
| February 21, 2017; 7:00 pm, ESPN3 | | at Toledo | W 61–56 ^{OT} | 12–15 (8–7) | Savage Arena (3,859); Toledo, OH |
| February 25, 2017; 2:00 pm, ESPN3 | | Ball State | W 80–55 | 13–15 (9–7) | University Arena (2,857); Kalamazoo, MI |
| February 28, 2017; 8:00 pm, ESPN3 | | at Northern Illinois | W 70–56 | 14–15 (10–7) | Convocation Center (862); DeKalb, IL |
| March 3, 2017; 7:00 pm, ESPN3 | | Central Michigan; Michigan MAC Trophy | W 88–80 | 15–15 (11–7) | University Arena (4,194); Kalamazoo, MI |
MAC tournament
| March 6, 2017; 7:30 pm, ESPN3 | (5) | (12) Miami; First round | W 65–61 | 16–15 | University Arena (1,227); Kalamazoo, MI |
| March 9, 2017; 2:30 pm, BCSN/ESPN3 | (5) | vs. (4) Ball State; Quarterfinals | L 63–66 | 16–16 | Quicken Loans Arena (2,245); Cleveland, OH |
*Non-conference game. ^{#}Rankings from AP Poll. (#) Tournament seedings in parentheses. All times are in Eastern Time Zone.

== See also ==
- 2016–17 Western Michigan Broncos women's basketball team
