= 2016–17 Bowling Green Falcons men's basketball team =

American college basketball season

2016–17 Bowling Green Falcons men's basketball
- Conference: Mid-American Conference
- East Division
- Record: 13–19 (7–11 MAC)
- Head coach: Michael Huger (2nd season)
- Assistant coaches: Anthony Stacey; Mike Summey; Kevin Noon
- Home arena: Stroh Center

2016–17 Mid-American Conference men's basketball standings
	Conf.				Overall
Team	W		L	PCT	W		L	PCT
East
Akron	14	–	4	.778	27	–	9	.750
Ohio	11	–	7	.611	20	–	11	.645
Buffalo	11	–	7	.611	17	–	15	.531
Kent State †	10	–	8	.556	22	–	14	.611
Bowling Green	7	–	11	.389	13	–	19	.406
Miami (OH)	4	–	14	.222	11	–	21	.344
West
Ball State	11	–	7	.611	21	–	13	.618
Western Michigan	11	–	7	.611	16	–	16	.500
Toledo	9	–	9	.500	17	–	17	.500
Eastern Michigan	7	–	11	.389	16	–	17	.485
Northern Illinois	7	–	11	.389	15	–	17	.469
Central Michigan	6	–	12	.333	16	–	16	.500
† 2017 MAC tournament winner

The 2016–17 Bowling Green Falcons men's basketball team represented Bowling Green State University during the 2016–17 NCAA Division I men's basketball season. The Falcons, led by second-year head coach Michael Huger, played their home games at the Stroh Center as members of the East Division of the Mid-American Conference.

They finished the season 13–19, 7–11 in MAC play to finish in a tie for eighth place. As the No. 10 seed in the MAC tournament, they lost in the first round to Toledo.

== Previous season ==
The Falcons finished the 2015–16 season 16–18, 5–13 in MAC play to finish in last place in the East Division. They defeated Kent State and Central Michigan to advance to the semifinals of the MAC tournament where they lost to Akron.

== Departures ==
Name	Number	Pos.	Height	Weight	Year	Hometown	Notes
Josh Gomez	0	C	6'10"	226	Senior	Bronx, NY	Graduated
Spencer Parker	3	F	6'7"	210	Senior	West Bloomfield, MI	Graduated
JD Tisdale	5	G	6'4"	185	Junior	Flint, MI	Transferred to Rogers State
David Joseph	10	G	6'0"	187	Senior	Queens, NY	Graduated
Brandon Busuttil	15	G	6'4"	205	Senior	Kitchener, ON	Graduated
Garrett Mayleben	33	F	6'9"	245	RS Sophomore	Milford, OH	Left the team for personal reasons

=== Incoming transfers ===
Name	Number	Pos.	Height	Weight	Year	Hometown	Previous School
Jeff Uju	13	F	6'7"	220	Junior	Bolingbrook, IL	Junior college transferred from Western Texas College

== Recruiting class of 2016 ==
College recruiting information
Name	Hometown	School	Height	Weight	Commit date
Roderick Caldwell; PG	Dayton, OH	Wayne High School	5 ft 10 in (1.78 m)	160 lb (73 kg)	Sep 28, 2015
Roderick Caldwell; PG	Recruit ratings: Scout: Rivals: (NR)				
Dylan Frye; PG	Pembroke Pines, FL	Mater Academy Charter High School	6 ft 2 in (1.88 m)	170 lb (77 kg)	Sep 11, 2015
Dylan Frye; PG	Recruit ratings: Scout: Rivals: (NR)				
Justin Turner; SG	Detroit, MI	Renaissance High School	6 ft 4 in (1.93 m)	190 lb (86 kg)	Apr 12, 2016
Justin Turner; SG	Recruit ratings: Scout: Rivals: (NR)				
Overall recruit ranking:
Note: In many cases, Scout, Rivals, 247Sports, On3, and ESPN may conflict in their listings of height and weight.; In these cases, the average was taken. ESPN grades are on a 100-point scale.; Sources: "2016 Team Ranking". Rivals.

=== Recruiting class of 2017 ===
College recruiting information (2017)
Name	Hometown	School	Height	Weight	Commit date
Derek Koch #67 PF	West Salem, OH	Northwestern High School	6 ft 8 in (2.03 m)	225 lb (102 kg)	Sep 18, 2016
Derek Koch #67 PF	Recruit ratings: Scout: Rivals: (73)				
Daeqwon Plowden; SF	Philadelphia, PA	Mastery Charter School	6 ft 5 in (1.96 m)	N/A	Sep 7, 2016
Daeqwon Plowden; SF	Recruit ratings: Scout: Rivals: (NR)				
Joniya Gadson; PF	Fort Lauderdale, FL	Dillard High School	6 ft 11 in (2.11 m)	N/A	Oct 2, 2016
Joniya Gadson; PF	Recruit ratings: Scout: Rivals: (NR)				
Overall recruit ranking:
Note: In many cases, Scout, Rivals, 247Sports, On3, and ESPN may conflict in their listings of height and weight.; In these cases, the average was taken. ESPN grades are on a 100-point scale.; Sources: "2017 Team Ranking". Rivals.

== Roster ==
2016–17 Bowling Green Falcons men's basketball team
Players
Coaches

Pos.	#	Name	Height	Weight	Year	Previous school	Hometown
F	1	Demajeo Wiggins	6 ft 10 in (2.08 m)	240 lb (109 kg)	So	Springfield	Toledo, OH
G	2	Malik Hluchoweckyj	6 ft 1 in (1.85 m)	175 lb (79 kg)	So	Bellevue West	Bellevue, NE
G	3	Rodrick Caldwell	5 ft 10 in (1.78 m)	175 lb (79 kg)	Fr	Wayne	Dayton, OH
G	4	Zack Denny	6 ft 2 in (1.88 m)	180 lb (82 kg)	Sr	Valley View	Germantown, OH
G	5	Dylan Frye	6 ft 2 in (1.88 m)	170 lb (77 kg)	Fr	Mater Academy	Pembroke Pines, FL
G	10	Justin Turner	6 ft 4 in (1.93 m)	190 lb (86 kg)	Fr	Renaissance	Detroit, MI
G	11	Antown Lillard	6 ft 5 in (1.96 m)	180 lb (82 kg)	So	Cleveland Central Catholic	Cleveland, OH
F	13	Jeffery Uju	6 ft 7 in (2.01 m)	220 lb (100 kg)	Jr	Oak Hill Academy; Western Texas College	Boilingbrook, IL
G	14	Wes Alcegaire	6 ft 6 in (1.98 m)	210 lb (95 kg)	Sr	Archbishop Curley-Notre Dame; Daytona State College	Miami, FL
G	20	Ismail Ali	6 ft 1 in (1.85 m)	165 lb (75 kg)	Sr	San Leandro; Antelope Valley College	South Hayward, CA
G	24	Matt Fox	6 ft 4 in (1.93 m)	190 lb (86 kg)	Jr	Anthony Wayne	Maumee, OH
G	30	Ethan Good (W)	6 ft 1 in (1.85 m)	180 lb (82 kg)	Fr	Wapakoneta	Wapakoneta, OH
F	32	Rasheed Worrell	6 ft 8 in (2.03 m)	220 lb (100 kg)	RS So	Sipsey Valley	Coker, AL

Head coach

- Michael Huger (Bowling Green)

Assistant coach(es)

- Anthony Stacey (Bowling Green)
- Mike Summey (NC State)
- Kevin Noon (Bowling Green)

Legend

- (C) Team captain
- (S) Suspended
- (I) Ineligible
- (W) Walk-on
- Injured
- Current redshirt

Roster

== Schedule and results ==
Date time, TV	Rank^{#}	Opponent^{#}	Result	Record	Site (attendance) city, state
Exhibition
November 4, 2016*; 5:00 pm		Capital	W 71–56		Stroh Center (871); Bowling Green, OH
Non-conference regular season
November 11, 2016*; 7:00 pm, ESPN3		at Oakland	L 70–78	0–1	Athletics Center O'rena (3,250); Rochester, MI
November 13, 2016*; 3:15 pm, ESPN3		at South Dakota	L 72–78	0–2	Sanford Coyote Sports Center (3,017); Vermillion, SD
November 19, 2016*; 4:00 pm, ESPN3		UMKC; Bill Frack Tournament	L 69–71	0–3	Stroh Center (1,676); Bowling Green, OH
November 20, 2016*; 6:00 pm, ESPN3		Green Bay; Bill Frack Tournament	L 61–77	0–4	Stroh Center (1,514); Bowling Green, OH
November 21, 2016*; 7:00 pm, ESPN3		Murray State; Bill Frack Tournament	W 78–77	1–4	Stroh Center (1,545); Bowling Green, OH
November 26, 2016*; 12:00 pm		Morgan State	W 90–58	2–4	Stroh Center (1,074); Bowling Green, OH
November 29, 2016*; 7:00 pm		Notre Dame College	W 86–60	3–4	Stroh Center (1,707); Bowling Green, OH
December 4, 2016*; 8:00 pm, ESPNU		at Cincinnati	L 56–85	3–5	Fifth Third Arena (7,162); Cincinnati, OH
December 6, 2016*; 8:00 pm, ESPN3		at Evansville	L 66–69	3–6	Ford Center (3,513); Evansville, IN
December 10, 2016*; 12:00 pm, ESPN3		Detroit	W 74–61	4–6	Stroh Center (1,513); Bowling Green, OH
December 18, 2016*; 5:00 pm		at San Jose State	L 76–77	4–7	Event Center Arena (1,452); San Jose, CA
December 22, 2016*; 12:00 pm, ESPN3		Alabama A&M	W 74–61	5–7	Stroh Center (1,338); Bowling Green, OH
December 30, 2016*; 2:00 pm		Norfolk State	W 86–77	6–7	Stroh Center (1,820); Bowling Green, OH
MAC regular season
January 3, 2017; 7:00 pm, ESPN3		at Akron	L 84–89	6–8 (0–1)	James A. Rhodes Arena (2,742); Akron, OH
January 7, 2017; 1:00 pm		at Ball State	W 76–71	7–8 (1–1)	Worthen Arena (2,645); Muncie, IN
January 10, 2017; 7:00 pm, ESPN3		Eastern Michigan	L 53–81	7–9 (1–2)	Stroh Center (1,605); Bowling Green, OH
January 14, 2017; 12:00 pm, ESPN3		Northern Illinois	L 52–69	7–10 (1–3)	Stroh Center; Bowling Green, OH
January 17, 2017; 7:00 pm, ESPN3		at Toledo	L 73–85	7–11 (1–4)	Savage Arena (5,118); Toledo, OH
January 21, 2017; 2:30 pm, ESPN3		Ball State	W 79–74	8–11 (2–4)	Stroh Center (2,953); Bowling Green, OH
January 24, 2017; 7:00 pm, ESPN3		at Central Michigan	L 76–82	8–12 (2–5)	McGuirk Arena (2,528); Mount Pleasant, MI
January 28, 2017; 12:00 pm, ESPN3		Ohio	L 72–96	8–13 (2–6)	Stroh Center (2,372); Bowling Green, OH
January 31, 2017; 7:00 pm, ESPN3		Miami (OH)	W 83–72	9–13 (3–6)	Stroh Center (1,525); Bowling Green, OH
February 4, 2017; 4:00 pm, ESPN3		Toledo	W 104–100 ^{2OT}	10–13 (4–6)	Stroh Center (2,676); Bowling Green, OH
February 7, 2017; 7:00 pm		at Kent State	W 84–83 ^{OT}	11–13 (5–6)	MAC Center (2,629); Kent, OH
February 11, 2017; 12:00 pm, ESPN3		Buffalo	L 74–88	11–14 (5–7)	Stroh Center (2,035); Bowling Green, OH
February 14, 2017; 7:00 pm, ESPN3		at Western Michigan	L 79–89	11–15 (5–8)	University Arena (1,763); Kalamazoo, MI
February 18, 2017; 2:00 pm, ESPN3		at Ohio	L 75–95	11–16 (5–9)	Convocation Center (8,150); Athens, OH
February 21, 2017; 9:00 pm, ESPN3		Akron	W 66–65	12–16 (6–9)	Stroh Center (1,611); Bowling Green, OH
February 25, 2017; 3:30 pm, ESPN3		at Miami (OH)	W 70–54	13–16 (7–9)	Millett Hall (1,586); Oxford, OH
February 28, 2017; 7:00 pm, ESPN3		Kent State	L 67–74	13–17 (7–10)	Stroh Center (2,014); Bowling Green, OH
March 3, 2017; 7:00 pm, ESPN3		at Buffalo	L 68–80	13–18 (7–11)	Alumni Arena (3,969); Amherst, NY
MAC tournament
03/06/2017; 8:00 pm, ESPN3	(10)	at (7) Toledo; First round	L 62–77	13–19	Savage Arena (4,085); Toledo, OH
*Non-conference game. ^{#}Rankings from AP Poll. (#) Tournament seedings in parentheses. All times are in Eastern Time Source.

== See also ==
- 2016–17 Bowling Green Falcons women's basketball team
