= 2015–16 Toledo Rockets men's basketball team =

American college basketball season

2015–16 Toledo Rockets men's basketball
- Conference: Mid-American Conference
- West Division
- Record: 17–15 (8–10 MAC)
- Head coach: Tod Kowalczyk (6th season)
- Assistant coaches: Jason Kaslow; Jeff Massey; Nick Dials
- Home arena: Savage Arena

2015–16 Mid-American Conference men's basketball standings
| | Conf. | | | | Overall |
| Team | W | | L | PCT | W | | L | PCT |
|---|---|---|---|---|---|---|---|---|
East
| Akron | 13 | – | 5 | .722 | 26 | – | 9 | .743 |
| Ohio | 11 | – | 7 | .611 | 23 | – | 12 | .657 |
| Kent State | 10 | – | 8 | .556 | 19 | – | 13 | .594 |
| Buffalo † | 10 | – | 8 | .556 | 20 | – | 15 | .571 |
| Miami (OH) | 6 | – | 12 | .333 | 13 | – | 20 | .394 |
| Bowling Green | 5 | – | 13 | .278 | 16 | – | 18 | .471 |
West
| Ball State | 10 | – | 8 | .556 | 21 | – | 14 | .600 |
| Central Michigan | 10 | – | 8 | .556 | 17 | – | 16 | .515 |
| Northern Illinois | 9 | – | 9 | .500 | 21 | – | 13 | .618 |
| Eastern Michigan | 9 | – | 9 | .500 | 18 | – | 15 | .545 |
| Toledo | 8 | – | 10 | .444 | 17 | – | 15 | .531 |
| Western Michigan | 7 | – | 11 | .389 | 13 | – | 19 | .406 |
† 2016 MAC tournament winner

The 2015–16 Toledo Rockets Huskies men's basketball team represented the University of Toledo during the 2015–16 NCAA Division I men's basketball season. The Rockets, led by sixth-year head coach Tod Kowalczyk, played their home games at Savage Arena, as members of the West Division of the Mid-American Conference. They finished the season 17–15, 8–10 in MAC play to finish in fifth place in the West Division. They lost in the first round of the MAC tournament to Eastern Michigan.

== Previous season ==
The Rockets finished the season 20–13, 11–7 in MAC play to finish in second place in the West Division. They advanced to the semifinals of the MAC tournament, where they lost to Central Michigan. Despite having 20 wins, they were not invited to a postseason tournament.

== Departures ==
| Name | Number | Pos. | Height | Weight | Year | Hometown | Reason for departure |
|---|---|---|---|---|---|---|---|
| Kurt Hall | 0 | G/F | 6'6" | 200 | Freshman | North Chicago, IL | Transferred to St. Cloud State |
| Dre Applewhite | 2 | G/F | 6'5" | 220 | Sophomore | Memphis, TN | Transferred to Our Lady of the Lake |
| Justin Drummond | 4 | G/F | 6'4" | 200 | Senior | Washington, D.C. | Graduated |
| Aubrey Williams | 15 | F | 6'7" | 215 | RS sophomore | Bowie, MD | Transferred to Kennesaw State |
| Julius Brown | 20 | G | 5'10" | 170 | Senior | Markham, IL | Graduated |
| Angel Aparicio | 22 | G | 6'5" | 190 | Junior | Benicarló, Spain | Transferred |
| J. D. Weatherspoon | 24 | F | 6'6" | 215 | Senior | Columbus, OH | Graduated |

=== Incoming transfers ===
| Name | Number | Pos. | Height | Weight | Year | Hometown | Previous school |
|---|---|---|---|---|---|---|---|
| Steve Taylor, Jr. | 23 | F | 6'7" | 240 | Senior | Chicago, IL | Transferred from Marquette. Under NCAA transfer rules, Taylor had to sit out for the 2015–16 season. Had one year of remaining eligibility. |

== Recruiting class of 2015 ==
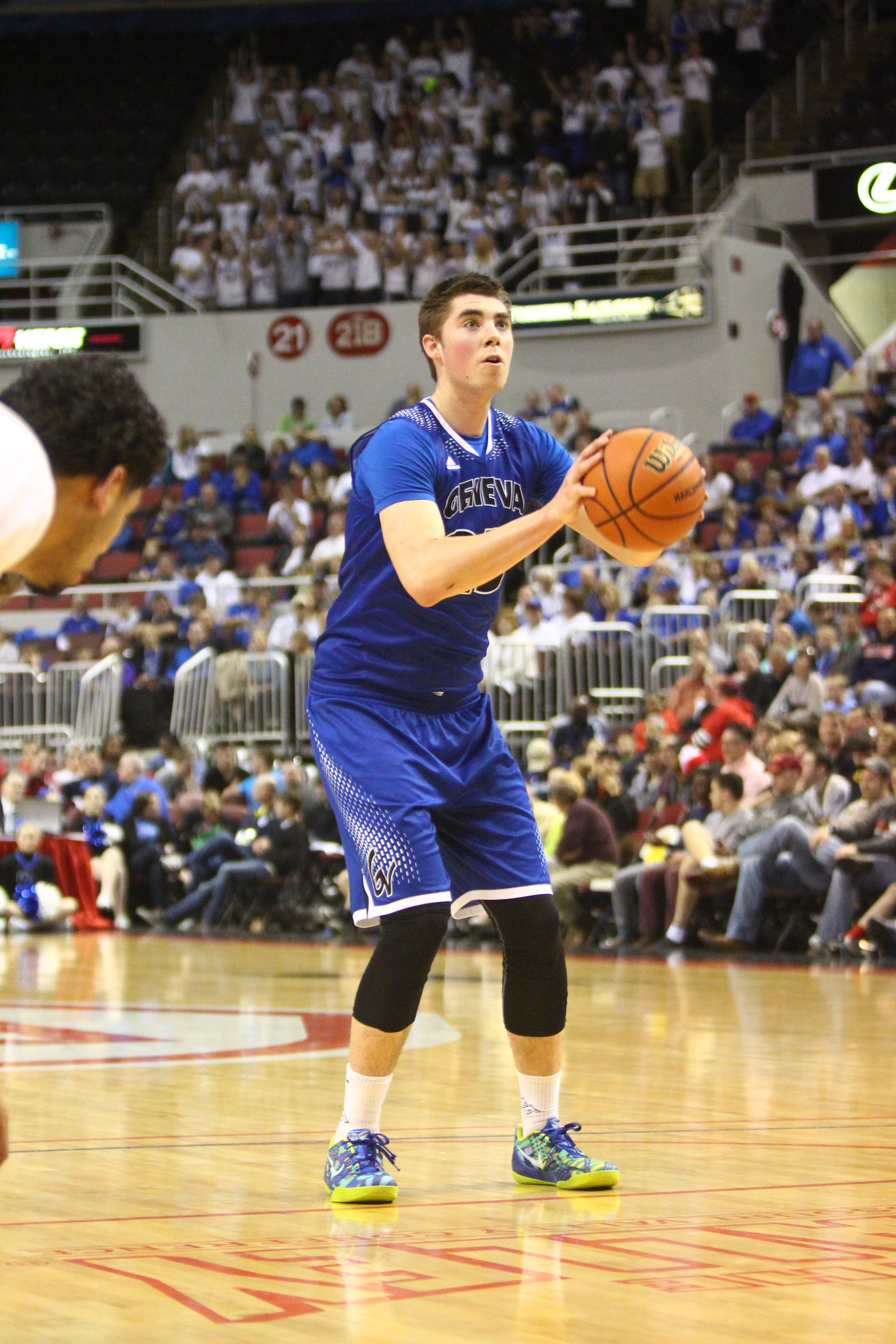
Nate Navigato at the 2015 IHSA 4A final four

College recruiting
| Name | Hometown | School | Height | Weight | Commit date |
|---|---|---|---|---|---|
| Nick Rogers #49 PG | Whitestown, IN | Elev8 Basketball Academy | 6 ft 1 in (1.85 m) | 170 lb (77 kg) | Mar 16, 2015 |
| Nick Rogers #49 PG | Recruit ratings: Scout: Rivals: (76) | | | | |
| Luke Knapke #50 C | Minster, OH | Marion Local High School | 6 ft 10 in (2.08 m) | 200 lb (91 kg) | Jul 29, 2015 |
| Luke Knapke #50 C | Recruit ratings: Scout: Rivals: (76) | | | | |
| Chandler White; SG | Fort Wayne, IN | Carroll High School | 6 ft 2 in (1.88 m) | 195 lb (88 kg) | Aug 6, 2014 |
| Chandler White; SG | Recruit ratings: Scout: Rivals: (NR) | | | | |
| Taylor Adway; PF | Hazel Crest, IL | Hillcrest High School | 6 ft 7 in (2.01 m) | 200 lb (91 kg) | Jul 3, 2014 |
| Taylor Adway; PF | Recruit ratings: Scout: Rivals: (NR) | | | | |
| Jaelan Sanford; PG | Evansville, IN | Reitz Memorial High School | 6 ft 4 in (1.93 m) | 195 lb (88 kg) | Aug 7, 2014 |
| Jaelan Sanford; PG | Recruit ratings: Scout: Rivals: (NR) | | | | |
| Nate Navigato; PF | Geneva, IL | Geneva High School | 6 ft 7 in (2.01 m) | 192 lb (87 kg) | May 6, 2015 |
| Nate Navigato; PF | Recruit ratings: Scout: Rivals: (NR) | | | | |
Overall recruit ranking:
Note: In many cases, Scout, Rivals, 247Sports, On3, and ESPN may conflict in their listings of height and weight.; In these cases, the average was taken. ESPN grades are on a 100-point scale.; Sources: "2015 Team Ranking". Rivals.

== Roster ==
2015–16 Toledo Rockets men's basketball team
Players
Coaches

| Pos. | # | Name | Height | Weight | Year | Previous school | Hometown |
|---|---|---|---|---|---|---|---|
| G | 1 | Jonathan Williams | 6 ft 3 in (1.91 m) | 180 lb (82 kg) | Jr | Southfield-Lathrup HS | Southfield, MI |
| F | 2 | Taylor Adway | 6 ft 9 in (2.06 m) | 210 lb (95 kg) | Fr | Hillcrest HS | Hazel Crest, IL |
| G | 3 | Stuckey Mosley | 6 ft 3 in (1.91 m) | 180 lb (82 kg) | So | Timber Creek HS | Orlando, FL |
| G | 5 | Chandler White | 6 ft 2 in (1.88 m) | 195 lb (88 kg) | Fr | Carroll HS | Fort Wayne, IN |
| G | 10 | Nick Rogers | 6 ft 1 in (1.85 m) | 170 lb (77 kg) | Fr | Elve8 Institute (FL) | Indianapolis, IN |
| G | 13 | Jaelan Sanford | 6 ft 4 in (1.93 m) | 195 lb (88 kg) | Fr | Reitz HS | Evansville, IN |
| F | 23 | Steve Taylor, Jr. (I) (redshirt) | 6 ft 7 in (2.01 m) | 240 lb (109 kg) | Sr | Siemon Career; Marquette | Chicago, IL |
| G | 25 | Jordan Lauf | 6 ft 5 in (1.96 m) | 190 lb (86 kg) | Jr | Napoleon HS | Napoleon, OH |
| F/C | 30 | Luke Knapke | 6 ft 11 in (2.11 m) | 210 lb (95 kg) | Fr | Marion Local HS | Minster, OH |
| C | 33 | Zach Garber | 6 ft 10 in (2.08 m) | 240 lb (109 kg) | Jr | Vanlue HS | Carey, OH |
| F | 35 | Nate Navigato | 6 ft 8 in (2.03 m) | 215 lb (98 kg) | Fr | Geneva HS | Geneva, IL |
| C | 53 | Nathan Boothe | 6 ft 9 in (2.06 m) | 250 lb (113 kg) | Sr | Warren Township HS | Gurnee, IL |

Head coach

- Tod Kowalczyk (Minnesota Duluth)

Assistant coach(es)

- Jason Kaslow (Wisconsin–Stevens Point)
- Jeff Massey (Xavier)
- Nick Dials (Akron)

Legend

- (C) Team captain
- (S) Suspended
- (I) Ineligible
- (W) Walk-on
- Injured
- Current redshirt

Roster

== Schedule ==
| Date time, TV | Rank^{#} | Opponent^{#} | Result | Record | Site (attendance) city, state |
Exhibition
| 11/07/2015*; 2:30 pm | | Hillsdale | W 100–99 | | Savage Arena; Toledo, OH |
Non-conference regular season
| 11/14/2015*; 2:30 pm | | West Virginia Tech | W 96–65 | 1–0 | Savage Arena (3,860); Toledo, OH |
| 11/18/2015*; 7:05 pm | | at Youngstown State | W 100–78 | 2–0 | Beeghly Center (1,723); Youngstown, OH |
| 11/21/2015*; 5:00 pm | | at Loyola–Chicago; Great Alaska Shootout Opening Round | L 62–69 | 2–1 | Joseph J. Gentile Arena (1,556); Chicago, IL |
| 11/25/2015*; 11:30 pm, CBSSN | | vs. San Jose State; Great Alaska Shootout quarterfinals | W 89–74 | 3–1 | Alaska Airlines Center (2,340); Anchorage, AK |
| 11/27/2015*; 9:30 pm, CBSSN | | vs. Loyola–Chicago; Great Alaska Shootout semifinals | W 82–74 | 4–1 | Alaska Airlines Center (2,757); Anchorage, AK |
| 11/28/2015*; 11:30 pm | | vs. Middle Tennessee; Great Alaska Shootout championship game | L 70–78 | 4–2 | Alaska Airlines Center (3,132); Anchorage, AK |
| 12/02/2015*; 7:00 pm | | Cleveland State | W 76–65 | 5–2 | Savage Arena (4,014); Toledo, OH |
| 12/06/2015*; 2:00 pm | | at Green Bay | W 71–69 | 6–2 | Resch Center (2,864); Green Bay, WI |
| 12/09/2015*; 7:30 pm | | at Detroit | L 62–69 | 6–3 | Calihan Hall (1,556); Detroit, MI |
| 12/12/2015*; 7:00 pm | | Oakland | L 64–76 | 6–4 | Savage Arena (4,684); Toledo, OH |
| 12/19/2015*; 7:00 pm | | Bethune-Cookman | W 102–68 | 7–4 | Savage Arena (4,029); Toledo, OH |
| 12/21/2015*; 7:00 pm | | North Carolina A&T | W 95–62 | 8–4 | Savage Arena (4,006); Toledo, OH |
| 12/30/2015*; 7:00 pm, ESPN3 | | Northern Kentucky | W 90–73 | 9–4 | Savage Arena (4,609); Toledo, OH |
MAC regular season
| 01/06/2016; 7:00 pm, ESPN3 | | at Ball State | L 69–87 | 9–5 (0–1) | John E. Worthen Arena (2152); Muncie, IN |
| 01/09/2016; 3:30 pm, TWCSC/ESPN3 | | at Miami (OH) | W 84–76 | 10–5 (1–1) | Millett Hall (1,224); Oxford, OH |
| 01/12/2016; 7:00 pm, ESPN3 | | Northern Illinois | W 71–66 | 10–6 (1–2) | Savage Arena (4,271); Toledo, OH |
| 01/15/2016; 7:00 pm, CBSSN | | Akron | W 78–64 | 11–6 (2–2) | Savage Arena (5,130); Toledo, OH |
| 01/19/2016; 7:00 pm, BCSN/ESPN3 | | at Bowling Green | W 81–76 | 12–6 (3–2) | Stroh Center (3,304); Bowling Green, OH |
| 01/22/2016; 6:30 pm, CBSSN | | at Northern Illinois | L 49–58 | 13–7 (3–3) | Convocation Center (3,166); DeKalb, IL |
| 01/26/2016; 7:00 pm, BCSN/ESPN3 | | Ohio | L 79–87 | 12–8 (3–4) | Savage Arena (4,276); Toledo, OH |
| 01/30/2016; 7:00 pm, ESPN3 | | Buffalo | L 68–73 | 12–9 (3–5) | Savage Arena (5,041); Toledo, OH |
| 02/02/2016; 7:00 pm, ESPN3 | | Western Michigan | W 89–62 | 13–9 (4–5) | Savage Arena (3,854); Toledo, OH |
| 02/06/2016; 7:00 pm, ESPN3 | | at Kent State | W 82–76 | 14–9 (5–5) | MAC Center (4,503); Kent, OH |
| 02/09/2016; 7:00 pm, TWCSC/ESPN3 | | at Buffalo | W 71–69 | 15–9 (7–4) | Alumni Arena (2,706); Amherst, NY |
| 02/13/2016; 7:00 pm, ESPN3 | | Miami (OH) | W 93–49 | 16–9 (7–5) | Savage Arena (5,029); Toledo, OH |
| 02/16/2016; 7:00 pm, ASN/ESPN3 | | at Central Michigan | L 69–77 | 16–10 (7–6) | McGuirk Arena (2,139); Mount Pleasant, MI |
| 02/20/2016; 12:00 pm, ESPN3 | | at Eastern Michigan | L 85–91 | 16–11 (7–7) | Convocation Center (1,636); Ypsilanti, MI |
| 02/23/2016; 7:00 pm, BCSN/ESPN3 | | Ball State | W 77–67 | 17–11 (8–7) | Savage Arena (4,112); Toledo, OH |
| 02/27/2016; 7:00 pm, ESPN3 | | Central Michigan | L 74–76 | 17–12 (8–8) | Savage Arena (5,629); Toledo, OH |
| 03/01/2016; 7:00 pm, ESPN3 | | at Western Michigan | L 64–70 | 17–13 (8–9) | University Arena (2,382); Kalamazoo, MI |
| 03/04/2016; 7:00 pm, BCSN/ESPN3 | | Eastern Michigan | L 71–75 | 17–14 (8–10) | Savage Arena (4,633); Toledo, OH |
MAC tournament
| 03/07/2016; 7:30 pm, ESPN3 | (9) | at (8) Eastern Michigan | L 60–69 | 17–15 | Convocation Center (1,556); Ypsilanti, MI |
*Non-conference game. ^{#}Rankings from AP Poll. (#) Tournament seedings in parentheses. All times are in Eastern.
