= 2015–16 Miami RedHawks men's basketball team =

American college basketball season

2015–16 Miami RedHawks men's basketball
- Conference: Mid-American Conference
- East Division
- Record: 13–20 (6–12 MAC)
- Head coach: John Cooper (4th season)
- Assistant coaches: Rick Duckett; Sheldon Everett; Trey Meyer
- Home arena: Millett Hall

2015–16 Mid-American Conference men's basketball standings
	Conf.				Overall
Team	W		L	PCT	W		L	PCT
East
Akron	13	–	5	.722	26	–	9	.743
Ohio	11	–	7	.611	23	–	12	.657
Kent State	10	–	8	.556	19	–	13	.594
Buffalo †	10	–	8	.556	20	–	15	.571
Miami (OH)	6	–	12	.333	13	–	20	.394
Bowling Green	5	–	13	.278	16	–	18	.471
West
Ball State	10	–	8	.556	21	–	14	.600
Central Michigan	10	–	8	.556	17	–	16	.515
Northern Illinois	9	–	9	.500	21	–	13	.618
Eastern Michigan	9	–	9	.500	18	–	15	.545
Toledo	8	–	10	.444	17	–	15	.531
Western Michigan	7	–	11	.389	13	–	19	.406
† 2016 MAC tournament winner

The 2015–16 Miami RedHawks men's basketball team represented Miami University during the 2015–16 NCAA Division I men's basketball season. The RedHawks, led by fourth-year head coach John Cooper, played their home games at Millett Hall, as members of the East Division of the Mid-American Conference.

They finished the season 13–20, 6–12 in MAC play to finish in fifth place in the East Division. They defeated Ball State in the first round of the MAC tournament to advance to the quarterfinals, where they lost to Buffalo.

== Previous season ==
The RedHawks finished the season 13–19, 8–10 in MAC play to finish in fifth place in the East Division. They lost in the first round of the MAC tournament to Eastern Michigan.

== Departures ==
Name	Number	Pos.	Height	Weight	Year	Hometown	Notes
Will Sullivan	3	G	6'3"	190	Senior	Elmhurst, IL	Graduated
Joshua Oswald	4	F	6'7"	225	Sophomore	Melbourne, Australia	Transferred to Emporia State
Jaryd Eustance	5	G	6'7"	201	Sophomore	Brisbane, Australia	Left the team for personal reasons
Tre Hawkins	20	G	5'10"	155	Freshman	Cincinnati, OH	Left the team for personal reasons
John Hawkins	40	C	7'0"	252	RS junior	Troy, MI	Left the team for personal reasons

=== Incoming transfers ===
Name	Number	Pos.	Height	Weight	Year	Hometown	Previous school
Jake Wright	13	G/F	6'4"	195	Sophomore	Hopkins, MN	Transferred from The Citadel. Under NCAA transfer rules, Wright had to sit out from the 2015–16 season. Had three years of remaining eligibility.
Jere Vučica	14	F	6'8"	210	RS senior	Split, Croatia	Transferred from North Alabama. Was eligible to play immediately, since he graduated from North Alabama.
Abdoulaye Harouna	30	G	6'4"	185	Sophomore	Niamey, Niger	Junior college, transferred from College of Southern Idaho.

== Recruiting class of 2015 ==
There was no recruiting class of 2015.

=== Recruiting class of 2016 ===
College recruiting (2016)
Name	Hometown	School	Height	Weight	Commit date
Braxton Beverly; PG	Hazard, KY	Perry County Central High School	5 ft 10 in (1.78 m)	160 lb (73 kg)	Sep 14, 2015
Braxton Beverly; PG	Recruit ratings: Scout: Rivals: (NR)				
Overall recruit ranking:
Note: In many cases, Scout, Rivals, 247Sports, On3, and ESPN may conflict in their listings of height and weight.; In these cases, the average was taken. ESPN grades are on a 100-point scale.; Sources: "2016 Team Ranking". Rivals.

== Roster ==
2015–16 Miami RedHawks men's basketball team
Players
Coaches

Pos.	#	Name	Height	Weight	Year	Previous school	Hometown
G	0	Geovonie McKnight	6 ft 3 in (1.91 m)	181 lb (82 kg)	Sr	Middletown HS	Middletown, OH
G	1	Zach McCormick	6 ft 2 in (1.88 m)	177 lb (80 kg)	So	Turpin HS	Cincinnati, OH
F	2	Rod Mills	6 ft 7 in (2.01 m)	208 lb (94 kg)	So	St. Xavier HS	Cincinnati, OH
F	11	Logan McLane	6 ft 9 in (2.06 m)	230 lb (104 kg)	So	Greenfield School	Winterville, NC
F/C	12	L. J. Livingston, Jr.	6 ft 10 in (2.08 m)	200 lb (91 kg)	Sr	Patterson Mill HS; Pensacola State	Upper Marlboro, MD
G/F	13	Jake Wright (I) (redshirt)	6 ft 4 in (1.93 m)	190 lb (86 kg)	So	Hopkins HS; The Citadel	Hopkins, MN
F	14	Jere Vučica	6 ft 9 in (2.06 m)	204 lb (93 kg)	RS Sr	PASS Marko Antun; North Alabama	Split, Croatia
G	15	Ali Barnes (W)	6 ft 0 in (1.83 m)	183 lb (83 kg)	RS So	Lakota West HS; Concord	West Chester, OH
G	20	Dion Wade	6 ft 6 in (1.98 m)	180 lb (82 kg)	RS So	Findlay Prep; Auburn	Antwerp, Belgium
F	21	Kalif Wright	6 ft 7 in (2.01 m)	235 lb (107 kg)	Sr	Oak Hill HS; Kilgore	Oak Hill, WV
G	22	Willie Moore	6 ft 3 in (1.91 m)	205 lb (93 kg)	Sr	Aiken HS; Oregon	Cincinnati, OH
F	24	Chris Bryant	6 ft 8 in (2.03 m)	217 lb (98 kg)	Sr	Rickards, HS; College of Central Florida	Tallahassee, FL
G	25	Jake Bischoff (W)	6 ft 3 in (1.91 m)	195 lb (88 kg)	RS Jr	Olentangy Liberty HS; Concord/Otterbein	Powell, OH
G	30	Abdoulaye Harouna	6 ft 5 in (1.96 m)	178 lb (81 kg)	So	South Kent; College of Southern Idaho	Niamey, Niger
G	33	Eric Washington	5 ft 10 in (1.78 m)	178 lb (81 kg)	RS Sr	Keenan; Presbyterian	Columbia, SC
F	35	Brian Oddo	6 ft 6 in (1.98 m)	205 lb (93 kg)	Sr	Providence Catholic HS	New Lenox, IL

Head coach

- John Cooper (Wichita State)

Assistant coach(es)

- Rick Duckett (North Carolina)
- Sheldon Everett (South Carolina)
- Trey Meyer (Clemson)

Legend

- (C) Team captain
- (S) Suspended
- (I) Ineligible
- (W) Walk-on
- Injured
- Current redshirt

Roster

== Schedule ==
Date time, TV	Rank^{#}	Opponent^{#}	Result	Record	Site (attendance) city, state
Exhibition
11/04/2015*; 7:00 pm		Ohio Midwestern	W 90–24		Millett Hall; Oxford, OH
Non-conference regular season
11/13/2015*; 7:00 pm, FCS		at Xavier	L 72–81	0–1	Cintas Center (10,372); Cincinnati, OH
11/17/2015*; 7:00 pm, ESPN3		Kenyon	W 68–47	1–1	Millett Hall (541); Oxford, OH
11/20/2015*; 7:00 pm		Lipscomb; Men Against Breast Cancer Challenge	W 70–68	2–1	Millett Hall (1,255); Oxford, OH
11/21/2015*; 3:30 pm		Florida Atlantic; Men Against Breast Cancer Challenge	L 69–75	2–2	Millett Hall (1,196); Oxford, OH
11/22/2015*; 2:00 pm, ESPN3		Northeastern; Men Against Breast Cancer Challenge	W 67–61	3–2	Millett Hall (1,174); Oxford, OH
11/24/2015*; 7:00 pm, ESPN3		IPFW	L 53–57	3–3	Millett Hall (1,224); Oxford, OH
11/28/2015*; 1:30 pm, ESPN3		UCF	W 64–63	4–3	Millett Hall (1,254); Oxford, OH
12/05/2015*; 1:00 pm		at IUPUI	L 64–78	4–4	Fairgrounds Coliseum (1,079); Indianapolis, IN
12/13/2015*; 1:30 pm, ESPN3		Wright State	W 72–67	5–4	Millett Hall (1,397); Oxford, OH
12/15/2015*; 7:00 pm, ESPN3		Jackson State	W 64–53	6–4	Millett Hall (1,119); Oxford, OH
12/18/2015*; 8:30 pm		at Tennessee Tech	L 64–77	6–5	Eblen Center (1,378); Cookeville, TN
12/22/2015*; 7:00 pm, TWCSC		at Dayton	L 63–64	6–6	UD Arena (13,206); Dayton, OH
01/02/2016*; 3:30 pm, ESPN3		South Carolina State	L 67–71	6–7	Millett Hall (1,392); Oxford, OH
MAC regular season
01/06/2016; 7:00 pm, BCSN/TWCSC/ESPN3		at Bowling Green	L 62–73	6–8 (0–1)	Stroh Center (1,611); Bowling Green, OH
01/09/2016; 3:30 pm, TWCSC/ESPN3		Toledo	L 76–84	6–9 (0–2)	Millett Hall (1,224); Oxford, OH
01/12/2016; 7:00 pm		at Kent State	L 68–76	6–10 (0–3)	MAC Center (2,588); Kent, OH
01/16/2016; 2:00 pm, ESPN3		at Ball State	L 46–48	6–11 (0–4)	John E. Worthen Arena (3,218); Muncie, IN
01/19/2016; 7:00 pm, ESPN3		Buffalo	L 60–77	6–12 (0–5)	Millett Hall (1,221); Oxford, OH
01/23/2016; 7:00 pm		at Akron	L 46–75	6–13 (0–6)	James A. Rhodes Arena (3,686); Akron, OH
01/26/2016; 7:00 pm, ASN/ESPN3		Central Michigan	L 51–68	6–14 (0–7)	Millett Hall (1,431); Oxford, OH
01/30/2016; 3:30 pm, ESPN3		Northern Illinois	W 72–59	7–14 (1–7)	Millett Hall (1,297); Oxford, OH
02/02/2016; 7:00 pm, ESPN3		at Eastern Michigan	L 69–94	7–15 (1–8)	Convocation Center (779); Ypsilanti, MI
02/06/2016; 3:30 pm, ESPN3		Bowling Green	W 55–51	8–15 (2–8)	Millett Hall (1,330); Oxford, OH
02/09/2016; 7:00 pm, ASN/ESPN3		at Western Michigan	W 45–44	9–15 (3–8)	University Arena (2,014); Kalamazoo, MI
02/13/2016; 7:00 pm, ESPN3		at Toledo	L 49–93	9–16 (3–9)	Savage Arena (5,029); Toledo, OH
02/16/2016; 7:00 pm, ESPN3		Ball State	L 56–73	9–17 (3–10)	Millett Hall (1,706); Oxford, OH
02/20/2016; 2:00 pm		at Ohio	W 76–64	9–18 (3–11)	Convocation Center (9,018); Athens, OH
02/23/2016; 7:00 pm, ASN/ESPN3		Akron	W 77–64	10–18 (4–11)	Millett Hall (1,371); Oxford, OH
02/27/2016; 3:30 pm, ESPN3		Kent State	W 74–65	11–18 (5–11)	Millett Hall (1,330); Oxford, OH
03/01/2016; 7:00 pm		at Buffalo	W 67–59	12–18 (6–11)	Alumni Arena (4,798); Amherst, NY
03/04/2016; 7:00 pm, ESPN3		Ohio	L 65–67	12–19 (6–12)	Millett Hall (4,208); Oxford, OH
MAC tournament
03/07/2016; 7:00 pm, ESPN3	(11)	at (6) Ball State; First round	W 49–47	13–19	John E. Worthen Arena (2,245); Muncie, IN
03/10/2016; 9:00 pm, ESPN3	(11)	vs. (3) Buffalo; Quarterfinals	L 81–94	13–20	Quicken Loans Arena (2,311); Cleveland, OH
*Non-conference game. ^{#}Rankings from AP Poll. (#) Tournament seedings in parentheses. All times are in Eastern Time.
