= John Cooper (basketball) =

American college basketball coach

Current position
- Title: Assistant coach
- Team: Kansas State
- Conference: Big 12

Biographical details
- Born: February 16, 1969 (age 57); Kansas City, Missouri, U.S.

Playing career
- 1987–1991: Wichita State
- 1991–1992: Fort Wayne Fury
- 1992–1993: Commodore Mustangs
- Position: Forward

Coaching career (HC unless noted)
- 1993–1995: Fayetteville State (asst.)
- 1995–2001: South Carolina (asst.)
- 2002–2004: Oregon (asst.)
- 2004–2009: Auburn (asst.)
- 2009–2012: Tennessee State
- 2012–2017: Miami (Ohio)
- 2017–2020: Oklahoma State (Special Asst. to the HC)
- 2020–2022: SMU (asst.)
- 2022–2026: UNLV (asst.)
- 2026-Present: Kansas State (asst.)

Head coaching record
- Overall: 102–152 (.402)

John Anthony Cooper (born February 16, 1969) is an American college basketball coach who is an assistant coach at Kansas State University.

Cooper was previously the head men's basketball coach at Miami University, accepting the position on April 6, 2012 after Charlie Coles announced his retirement. He was let go by the university at the end of the 2016–17 season. Prior to accepting the Job at Miami, Cooper was the head coach at Tennessee State University from 2009 to 2012.

== Head coaching record ==
Record table
Season	Team	Overall	Conference	Standing	Postseason
Tennessee State Tigers (Ohio Valley Conference) (2009–2012)
2009–10	Tennessee State	9–23	6–12	8th	
2010–11	Tennessee State	14–16	10–8	5th	
2011–12	Tennessee State	20–13	11–5	2nd	CIT First Round
Tennessee State:		43–52 (.453)	27–25 (.519)		
Miami RedHawks (Mid-American Conference) (2012–2017)
2012–13	Miami	9–22	3–13	6th (East)	
2013–14	Miami	13–18	8–10	4th (East)	
2014–15	Miami	13–19	8–10	5th (East)	
2015–16	Miami	13–20	6–12	5th (East)	
2016–17	Miami	11–21	4–14	6th (East)	
Miami:		59–100 (.371)	29–59 (.330)		
Total:		102–152 (.402)			
National champion Postseason invitational champion Conference regular season champion Conference regular season and conference tournament champion Division regular season champion Division regular season and conference tournament champion Conference tournament champion
