= 2015–16 Kent State Golden Flashes men's basketball team =

American college basketball season

2015–16 Kent State Golden Flashes men's basketball
- Conference: Mid-American Conference
- East Division
- Record: 19–13 (10–8 MAC)
- Head coach: Rob Senderoff (5th season)
- Assistant coaches: Eric Haut; Bobby Steinburg; DeAndre Haynes
- Home arena: MAC Center

2015–16 Mid-American Conference men's basketball standings
	Conf.				Overall
Team	W		L	PCT	W		L	PCT
East
Akron	13	–	5	.722	26	–	9	.743
Ohio	11	–	7	.611	23	–	12	.657
Kent State	10	–	8	.556	19	–	13	.594
Buffalo †	10	–	8	.556	20	–	15	.571
Miami (OH)	6	–	12	.333	13	–	20	.394
Bowling Green	5	–	13	.278	16	–	18	.471
West
Ball State	10	–	8	.556	21	–	14	.600
Central Michigan	10	–	8	.556	17	–	16	.515
Northern Illinois	9	–	9	.500	21	–	13	.618
Eastern Michigan	9	–	9	.500	18	–	15	.545
Toledo	8	–	10	.444	17	–	15	.531
Western Michigan	7	–	11	.389	13	–	19	.406
† 2016 MAC tournament winner

The 2015–16 Kent State Golden Flashes men's basketball team represented Kent State University during the 2015–16 NCAA Division I men's basketball season, their 100th season of play. The Golden Flashes, led by fifth year head coach Rob Senderoff, played their home games at the Memorial Athletic and Convocation Center, also known as the MAC Center, as members of the East Division of the Mid-American Conference. They finished the season 19–13, 10–8 in MAC play to finish in a tie for third place in the East Division. They lost in the first round of the MAC tournament to Bowling Green. Despite having 19 wins, they did not participate in a postseason tournament.

== Previous season ==
The Golden Flashes finished the season 23–12, 12–6 in MAC play to finish in a share for the East Division championship as well as a share of the MAC overall regular season championship. They lost in the quarterfinals of the MAC tournament to Akron. They were invited to the CollegeInsider.com Tournament where they defeated Middle Tennessee in the first round and Texas A&M Corpus–Christi in the second round before losing in the quarterfinals to Northern Arizona.

== Departures ==
Name	Number	Pos.	Height	Weight	Year	Hometown	Notes
Devareaux Manley	0	G	6'4"	200	Senior	Oakland, CA	Graduated
Kris Brewer	1	G	6'3"	185	Senior	Memphis, TN	Graduated
Gary Akbar	13	G/F	6'5"	220	Junior	Dayton, OH	Graduated & transferred to UT Permian Basin
Craig Brown	15	G/F	6'5"	220	Senior	Miami, FL	Graduated
Marquiez Lawerence	20	F	6'8"	200	Sophomore	Columbus, OH	Transferred to Central Missouri
Derek Jackson	23	G	6'1"	170	RS Senior	Cleveland, OH	Graduated
Blake Vedder	41	C	7'4"	235	Senior	Chesterland, OH	Graduated

=== Incoming transfers ===
Name	Number	Pos.	Height	Weight	Year	Hometown	Previous School
Galal Cancer	15	G	6'2"	180	RS Senior	Albany, NY	Transferred from Cornell. Will be eligible to play immediately since Cancer graduated from Cornell.
Desmond Ridenour	25	G	6'2"	185	Junior	Cleveland Heights, OH	Transferred from Duquesne. Under NCAA transfer rules, Ridenour will have to sit out from the 2015–16 season. Will have two years of remaining eligibility.

== Recruiting class of 2015 ==
College recruiting information
Name	Hometown	School	Height	Weight	Commit date
Jalen Avery #44 PG	Covington, KY	Shroder Paideia Academy	6 ft 2 in (1.88 m)	170 lb (77 kg)	Sep 29, 2014
Jalen Avery #44 PG	Recruit ratings: Scout: Rivals: (77)				
Devon Andrews #73 SG	Lorain, OH	Lorain High School	6 ft 5 in (1.96 m)	195 lb (88 kg)	Sep 25, 2013
Devon Andrews #73 SG	Recruit ratings: Scout: Rivals: (75)				
Jaylin Walker; SG	Romulus, MI	Romulus High School	6 ft 2 in (1.88 m)	180 lb (82 kg)	Sep 25, 2013
Jaylin Walker; SG	Recruit ratings: Scout: Rivals: (75)				
Overall recruit ranking:
Note: In many cases, Scout, Rivals, 247Sports, On3, and ESPN may conflict in their listings of height and weight.; In these cases, the average was taken. ESPN grades are on a 100-point scale.; Sources: "2015 Team Ranking". Rivals.

=== Recruiting class of 2016 ===
College recruiting information (2016)
Name	Hometown	School	Height	Weight	Commit date
Yavari Hall; SG	Warrensville Heights, OH	Warrensville Heights High School	6 ft 3 in (1.91 m)	185 lb (84 kg)	Jun 16, 2015
Yavari Hall; SG	Recruit ratings: Scout: Rivals: (74)				
Mitch Peterson; SG	Richfield, OH	Walsh Jesuit High School	6 ft 4 in (1.93 m)	190 lb (86 kg)	May 1, 2015
Mitch Peterson; SG	Recruit ratings: Scout: Rivals: (NR)				
Overall recruit ranking:
Note: In many cases, Scout, Rivals, 247Sports, On3, and ESPN may conflict in their listings of height and weight.; In these cases, the average was taken. ESPN grades are on a 100-point scale.; Sources: "2016 Team Ranking". Rivals.

== Roster ==
2015–16 Kent State Golden Flashes men's basketball team
Players
Coaches

Pos.	#	Name	Height	Weight	Year	Previous school	Hometown
G	0	Jalen Avery	6 ft 0 in (1.83 m)	185 lb (84 kg)	Fr	Shroder HS	Covington, KY
G	1	Xavier Pollard	6 ft 4 in (1.93 m)	210 lb (95 kg)	RS Sr	Suffield Academy; Maine	Bronx, NY
F/C	3	Marvin Jones	6 ft 10 in (2.08 m)	205 lb (93 kg)	RS Jr	Thornton HS; Highland CC	Chicago, IL
F	4	Chris Ortiz	6 ft 8 in (2.03 m)	225 lb (102 kg)	Sr	South Kent School	Brooklyn, NY
G	5	Kellon Thomas	5 ft 11 in (1.8 m)	190 lb (86 kg)	RS Jr	Southport HS	Indianapolis, IN
G	11	Jon Fleming	5 ft 9 in (1.75 m)	160 lb (73 kg)	Jr	Fishers HS	Fishers, IN
F	14	Alonzo Walker	6 ft 6 in (1.98 m)	180 lb (82 kg)	Fr	Orangeville Prep	Brampton, ON
G	15	Galal Cancer	6 ft 2 in (1.88 m)	180 lb (82 kg)	RS Sr	Christian Brothers Academy; Cornell	Albany, NY
F	21	Khalig Spicer	6 ft 9 in (2.06 m)	230 lb (104 kg)	Sr	Robichaud HS	Detroit, MI
G	23	Jaylin Walker	6 ft 1 in (1.85 m)	180 lb (82 kg)	Fr	Romulus HS	Detroit, MI
G	25	Desmond Ridenour (I) (redshirt)	6 ft 2 in (1.88 m)	185 lb (84 kg)	Jr	Benedictine; Duquesne	Cleveland Heights, OH
G	30	Deon Edwin	6 ft 3 in (1.91 m)	210 lb (95 kg)	RS Jr	Red Lion Christian Academy; Laramie County CC	British Virgin Islands
F	32	Raasean Davis	6 ft 8 in (2.03 m)	260 lb (118 kg)	So	Paulding County HS	Chicago, IL
F	35	Jimmy Hall	6 ft 7 in (2.01 m)	235 lb (107 kg)	RS Jr	St. Anthony HS; Hofstra	Brooklyn, NY

Head coach

- Rob Senderoff (Albany)

Assistant coach(es)

- Eric Haut (Kent State)
- Bobby Steinberg (Middle Tennessee)
- DeAndre Haynes (Kent State)

Legend

- (C) Team captain
- (S) Suspended
- (I) Ineligible
- (W) Walk-on
- Injured
- Current redshirt

Roster

== Schedule and results ==
Date time, TV	Rank^{#}	Opponent^{#}	Result	Record	Site (attendance) city, state
Non-Conference Games
11/14/2015*; 7:00 pm		Youngstown State; Coaches vs. Cancer Tip-Off	W 79–70	1–0	MAC Center (5,471); Kent, OH
11/18/2015*; 8:00 pm		at Southern Illinois	L 69–72	1–1	SIU Arena (4,362); Carbondale, IL
11/21/2015*; 7:00 pm		Marist	W 79–72	2–1	MAC Center (3,822); Kent, OH
11/24/2015*; 8:30 pm		Saint Francis (PA)	W 79–60	3–1	MAC Center (3,262); Kent, OH
11/28/2015*; 4:00 pm, ESPN3		at Pittsburgh	L 76–85	3–2	Peterson Events Center (7,815); Pittsburgh, PA
12/5/2015*; 3:00 pm		vs. Cleveland State	W 66–62	4–2	Quicken Loans Arena (3,671); Cleveland, OH
12/7/2015*; 7:00 pm		at NJIT	W 80–75	5–2	Fleisher Center (987); Newark, NJ
12/10/2015*; 7:00 pm		Louisiana–Monroe; Las Vegas Classic Regional Round	W 73–62	6–2	MAC Center (2,689); Kent, OH
12/12/2015*; 7:00 pm		Canisius; Las Vegas Classic Regional Round	W 84–77	7–2	MAC Center (3,107); Kent, OH
12/22/2015*; 8:00 pm		vs. #18 SMU; Las Vegas Classic Semifinals	L 74–90	7–3	Orleans Arena; Paradise, NV
12/23/2015*; 8:00 pm, FS1		vs. Penn State; Las Vegas Classic 3rd Place Game	L 69-75	7–4	Orleans Arena; Paradise, NV
12/30/2015*; 4:00 pm		at North Carolina A&T	W 61–60	8–4	Corbett Sports Center (1,015); Greensboro, NC
1/2/2016*; 7:00 pm		Oberlin	W 104–58	9–4	MAC Center (2,414); Kent, OH
Conference Games
1/5/2016; 7:00 pm		at Western Michigan	W 87–84 ^{OT}	10–4 (1–0)	University Arena (2,016); Kalamazoo, MI
1/8/2016; 6:30 pm, CBSSN		Buffalo	L 67–76	10–5 (1–1)	MAC Center (3,522); Kent, OH
1/12/2016; 7:00 pm		Miami (OH)	W 76–68	11–5 (2–1)	MAC Center (2,588); Kent, OH
1/16/2016; 7:00 pm		Ohio	W 89–82	12–5 (3–1)	MAC Center (3,845); Kent, OH
1/19/2016; 7:00 pm, ESPN3		at Ball State	W 76–68	13–5 (4–1)	Worthen Arena (3,190); Muncie, IN
1/23/2016; 4:00 pm		at Bowling Green	W 62–59	14–5 (5–1)	Stroh Center (3,100); Bowling Green, OH
1/26/2016; 7:00 pm		Eastern Michigan	W 73–58	15–5 (6–1)	MAC Center (3,858); Kent, OH
1/29/2016; 9:00 pm, ESPNU		at Ohio	L 61–72	15–6 (6–2)	Convocation Center (6,713); Athens, OH
2/2/2016; 7:00 pm		at Central Michigan	L 61–88	15–7 (6–3)	McGuirk Arena (2,138); Mount Pleasant, MI
2/6/2016; 7:00 pm		Toledo	L 67–82	15–8 (6–4)	MAC Center (4,503); Kent, OH
2/9/2016; 7:00 pm		Northern Illinois	W 75–74	16–8 (7–4)	MAC Center (2,764); Kent, OH
2/13/2016; 12:00 pm, ESPN3		at Eastern Michigan	L 70–75	16–9 (7–5)	Convocation Center (1,059); Ypsilanti, MI
2/16/2016; 7:00 pm		Western Michigan	W 85–78 ^{OT}	17–9 (8–5)	MAC Center (3,035); Kent, OH
2/19/2016; 6:00 pm, ESPNU		Akron	W 85–76	18–9 (9–5)	MAC Center (6,327); Kent, OH
2/23/2016; 6:00 pm, TWCSC		at Buffalo	L 70–87	18–10 (9–6)	Alumni Arena (3,284); Buffalo, NY
2/27/2016; 3:30 pm		at Miami (OH)	L 65–74	18–11 (9–7)	Millett Hall (1,330); Oxford, OH
3/1/2016; 7:00 pm, TWCSC		Bowling Green	W 70–54	19–11 (10–7)	MAC Center (3,531); Kent, OH
3/4/2016; 7:00 pm, ESPN2		at Akron	L 60–74	19–12 (10–8)	James A. Rhodes Arena (5,301); Akron, OH
MAC tournament
3/7/2016; 7:00 pm	(5)	(12) Bowling Green; First round	L 69–70	19–13	MAC Center (2,660); Kent, OH
*Non-conference game. ^{#}Rankings from AP Poll. (#) Tournament seedings in parentheses. All times are in Eastern.

== See also ==
- List of Kent State Golden Flashes men's basketball seasons
