= 2015–16 Ohio Bobcats men's basketball team =

American college basketball season

2015–16 Ohio Bobcats men's basketball

CBI, Semifinals
- Conference: Mid-American Conference
- East Division
- Record: 23–12 (11–7 MAC)
- Head coach: Saul Phillips (2nd season)
- Assistant coaches: Will Ryan; Jason Kemp; Aaron Fuss
- Home arena: Convocation Center

2015–16 Mid-American Conference men's basketball standings
	Conf.				Overall
Team	W		L	PCT	W		L	PCT
East
Akron	13	–	5	.722	26	–	9	.743
Ohio	11	–	7	.611	23	–	12	.657
Kent State	10	–	8	.556	19	–	13	.594
Buffalo †	10	–	8	.556	20	–	15	.571
Miami (OH)	6	–	12	.333	13	–	20	.394
Bowling Green	5	–	13	.278	16	–	18	.471
West
Ball State	10	–	8	.556	21	–	14	.600
Central Michigan	10	–	8	.556	17	–	16	.515
Northern Illinois	9	–	9	.500	21	–	13	.618
Eastern Michigan	9	–	9	.500	18	–	15	.545
Toledo	8	–	10	.444	17	–	15	.531
Western Michigan	7	–	11	.389	13	–	19	.406
† 2016 MAC tournament winner

The 2015–16 Ohio Bobcats men's basketball team represented Ohio University during the 2015–16 NCAA Division I men's basketball season. The Bobcats, led by second year head coach Saul Phillips, played its home games at the Convocation Center in Athens, Ohio as a member of the East Division of the Mid-American Conference. They finished the season 23–12, 11–7 in MAC play to finish in second place in the East Division. They defeated Northern Illinois in the quarterfinals of the MAC tournament to advance to the semifinals where they lost to Buffalo. They were invited to the College Basketball Invitational where they defeated Albany and UNC Greensboro to advance to the semifinals where they lost to Morehead State.

== Previous season ==
The Bobcats finished the 2014–15 season 10–20, 5–13 in MAC play to finish in last place in the East Division. They lost in the first round of the MAC tournament to Western Michigan.

=== Departures ===
Departures
Name	Number	Pos.	Height	Weight	Year	Hometown	Reason
Javarez Willis	3	G	5'11"	172	RS Senior	Homer, LA	Graduated
Maurice Ndour	5	F	6'9"	200	Senior	Mbour, Senegal	Graduated
Ryan Taylor	14	G	6'1"	190	Freshman	Gary, IN	Transferred to Evansville
Stevie Taylor	22	G	5'10"	174	Senior	Gahanna, OH	Graduated

== Recruits ==
College recruiting information
Name	Hometown	School	Height	Weight	Commit date
Doug Taylor; C	Columbus, OH	Northland High School	6 ft 8 in (2.03 m)	220 lb (100 kg)	
Doug Taylor; C	Recruit ratings: Scout: Rivals: 247Sports: (76)				
Jordan Dartis; SG	Newark, OH	Newark High School	6 ft 2 in (1.88 m)	180 lb (82 kg)	Aug 11, 2014
Jordan Dartis; SG	Recruit ratings: Scout: Rivals: 247Sports: (75)				
Ellis Dozier; PF	Sandy Spring, MD	Fishburne Military School	6 ft 9 in (2.06 m)	225 lb (102 kg)	Nov 5, 2014
Ellis Dozier; PF	Recruit ratings: Scout: Rivals: 247Sports: (70)				
Gavin Block; SG	Lincoln, IL	Lincoln Community High School	6 ft 5 in (1.96 m)	185 lb (84 kg)	Oct 20, 2014
Gavin Block; SG	Recruit ratings: Scout: Rivals: 247Sports: (NR)				
James Gollon; SF	Stevens Point, WI	Pacelli High School	6 ft 5 in (1.96 m)	N/A	Feb 15, 2015
James Gollon; SF	Recruit ratings: Scout: Rivals: 247Sports: (NR)				
Overall recruit ranking:
Note: In many cases, Scout, Rivals, 247Sports, On3, and ESPN may conflict in their listings of height and weight.; In these cases, the average was taken. ESPN grades are on a 100-point scale.; Sources: "Ohio Basketball Commitment List". Rivals.; "2015 Ohio Basketball Commits". Scout.; "ESPN". ESPN.; "Scout.com Team Recruiting Rankings". Scout.; "2015 Team Ranking". Rivals.

=== Recruiting class of 2016 ===
College recruiting information (2016)
Name	Hometown	School	Height	Weight	Commit date
Jason Carter; PF	Johnstown, OH	Johnstown-Monroe High School	6 ft 6 in (1.98 m)	N/A	Jun 29, 2015
Jason Carter; PF	Recruit ratings: Scout: Rivals: 247Sports: (NR)				
Overall recruit ranking:
Note: In many cases, Scout, Rivals, 247Sports, On3, and ESPN may conflict in their listings of height and weight.; In these cases, the average was taken. ESPN grades are on a 100-point scale.; Sources: "Ohio Basketball Commitment List". Rivals.; "2015 Ohio Basketball Commits". Scout.; "ESPN". ESPN.; "Scout.com Team Recruiting Rankings". Scout.; "2015 Team Ranking". Rivals.

== Roster ==
2015–16 Ohio Bobcats men's basketball team
Players
Coaches

Pos.	#	Name	Height	Weight	Year	Hometown
F	0	Treg Setty	6 ft 8 in (2.03 m)	194 lb (88 kg)	RS Sr	Maysville, KY
G	2	Jaaron Simmons	6 ft 1 in (1.85 m)	175 lb (79 kg)	RS So	Dayton, OH
G	3	James Gollon	6 ft 5 in (1.96 m)	190 lb (86 kg)	Fr	Stevens Point, WI
F	4	Wadly Mompremier	6 ft 10 in (2.08 m)	225 lb (102 kg)	Jr	Miami, FL
G/F	11	Khari Harley	6 ft 8 in (2.03 m)	175 lb (79 kg)	RS So	Egg Harbor Township, NJ
G	12	Drew Crabtree (W)	6 ft 1 in (1.85 m)	190 lb (86 kg)	So	Marysville, OH
F	13	Kenny Kaminski	6 ft 1 in (1.85 m)	190 lb (86 kg)	RS Jr	Medina, OH
F	21	Sam Frayer (W)	6 ft 6 in (1.98 m)	215 lb (98 kg)	So	Cincinnati, OH
G/F	22	Gavin Frayer	6 ft 6 in (1.98 m)	195 lb (88 kg)	Fr	Lincoln, IL
G	24	Mike Laster	6 ft 4 in (1.93 m)	180 lb (82 kg)	So	Detroit, MI
F	25	Ellis Dozier	6 ft 9 in (2.06 m)	225 lb (102 kg)	Fr	Sandy Spring, MD
F	33	Antonio Campbell	6 ft 8 in (2.03 m)	260 lb (118 kg)	Jr	Cincinnati, OH
G	35	Jordan Dartis	6 ft 2 in (1.88 m)	180 lb (82 kg)	Fr	Newark, OH
F	45	Doug Taylor	6 ft 8 in (2.03 m)	220 lb (100 kg)	Fr	Columbus, OH

Head coach

- Saul Phillips (UW–Platteville)

Assistant coach(es)

- Will Ryan (Wisconsin)
- Jason Kemp (UW–La Crosse)
- Aaron Fuss (Ohio State)

Legend

- (C) Team captain
- (S) Suspended
- (I) Ineligible
- (W) Walk-on
- Injured
- Current redshirt

Roster

== Preseason ==
The preseason poll and league awards were announced by the league office on October 28, 2015. Ohio was picked to finish third in the MAC East.

=== Preseason men's basketball poll ===
(First place votes in parentheses)

==== East Division ====
1. Akron 132 (17)
2. Kent State 116 (5)
3. Ohio 69
4. Buffalo 64 (1)
5. Miami 60
6. Bowling Green 42

==== West Division ====
1. Central Michigan 138 (23)
2. Toledo 110
3. Western Michigan 94
4. Eastern Michigan 71
5. Northern Illinois 37
6. Ball State 33

==== Tournament champs ====
Central Michigan (15), Akron (6), Buffalo (1), Kent State (1)

=== Preseason All-MAC ===
Preseason All-MAC teams
Team	Player	Position	Year
Preseason All-MAC East	Antonio Campbell	F	Jr.

== Schedule ==
Date time, TV	Rank^{#}	Opponent^{#}	Result	Record	Site (attendance) city, state
Exhibition
11/07/2015*; 2:00 pm		Indiana Tech	W 73–57	–	Convocation Center (8,384); Athens, OH
Non-conference regular season
11/14/2015*; 2:00 pm		Florida Gulf Coast	W 85–75	1–0	Convocation Center (5,851); Athens, OH
11/16/2015*; 7:00 pm		Tennessee State	W 75–67	2–0	Convocation Center (5,854); Athens, OH
11/20/2015*; 12:30 pm		vs. Tulsa; Paradise Jam quarterfinals	L 88–90	2–1	Sports and Fitness Center (5,854); St. Thomas, VI
11/21/2015*; 4:00 pm		vs. Norfolk State; Paradise Jam Consolation	W 93–71	3–1	Sports and Fitness Center; St. Thomas, VI
11/23/2015*; 4:00 pm		vs. Florida State; Paradise Jam 5th place game	W 90–81	3–2	Sports and Fitness Center (1,433); St. Thomas, VI
12/01/2015*; 7:00 pm, TWCSC		Marshall	W 85–70	4–2	Convocation Center (6,783); Athens, OH
12/05/2015*; 4:00 pm, TWCSC		at St. Bonaventure	L 68–81	4–3	Reilly Center (3,565); Olean, NY
12/12/2015*; 1:00 pm, TWCSC/ESPN3		at Cleveland State	W 76–67	5–3	Quicken Loans Arena (3,261); Cleveland, OH
12/15/2015*; 7:00 pm, TWCSC		Ohio Dominican	W 93–69	6–3	Convocation Center (5,223); Athens, OH
12/17/2015*; 7:00 pm		Jackson State	W 72–67	7–3	Convocation Center (5,183); Athens, OH
12/21/2015*; 7:00 pm		Arkansas–Pine Bluff	W 65–58	8–3	Convocation Center (5,254); Athens, OH
12/30/2015*; 7:00 pm		UC Riverside	W 81–59	9–3	Convocation Center (5,267); Athens, OH
MAC regular season
01/06/2016; 8:00 pm, ESPN3		at Northern Illinois	L 69–80	9–4 (0–1)	Convocation Center (1,038); DeKalb, IL
01/09/2016; 2:00 pm		Ball State	W 79–73	10–4 (1–1)	Convocation Center (6,703); Athens, OH
01/12/2016; 7:00 pm, TWCSC		Bowling Green	L 75–91	10–5 (1–2)	Convocation Center (7,083); Athens, OH
01/16/2016; 7:00 pm		at Kent State	L 82–89	10–6 (1–3)	MAC Center (3,845); Kent, OH
01/19/2016; 7:00 pm, ASN		Western Michigan	W 82–64	11–6 (2–3)	Convocation Center (6,346); Athens, OH
01/23/2016; 4:30 pm, ESPN3		at Central Michigan	L 49–72	11–7 (2–4)	McGuirk Arena (3,333); Mount Pleasant, MI
01/26/2016; 7:00 pm, BCSN		at Toledo	W 81–79	12–7 (3–4)	Savage Arena (4,276); Toledo, OH
01/30/2016; 9:00 pm, ESPNU		Kent State	W 72–61	13–7 (4–4)	Convocation Center (6,713); Athens, OH
02/02/2016; 7:00 pm, TWCSC		Akron	L 68–80	13–8 (4–5)	Convocation Center (6,403); Athens, OH
02/06/2016; 2:00 pm, ESPN3		Northern Illinois	W 80–69	14–8 (5–5)	Convocation Center (8,773); Athens, OH
02/09/2016; 7:00 pm, ESPN3		at Ball State	W 72–69	15–8 (6–5)	John E. Worthen Arena (3,100); Muncie, IN
02/13/2016; 7:00 pm, ESPNU		at Buffalo	W 94–75	16–8 (7–5)	Alumni Arena (2,702); Amherst, NY
02/16/2016; 7:00 pm		Eastern Michigan	W 86–64	17–8 (8–5)	Convocation Center (6,212); Athens, OH
02/20/2016; 2:00 pm		Miami (OH)	W 76–64	18–8 (9–5)	Convocation Center (9,018); Athens, OH
02/23/2016; 7:00 pm		at Bowling Green	L 82–87	18–9 (9–6)	Stroh Center (2,332); Bowling Green, OH
02/27/2016; 3:30 pm, ESPN3		Buffalo	W 103–96 ^{OT}	19–9 (10–6)	Convocation Center (7,221); Athens, OH
03/01/2016; 8:00 pm, ASN		at Akron	L 76–91	19–10 (10–7)	James A. Rhodes Arena (4,192); Akron, OH
03/04/2016; 7:00 pm, ESPN3		at Miami (OH)	W 67–65	20–10 (11–7)	Millett Hall (4,208); Oxford, OH
MAC tournament
03/10/2016; 6:30 pm, BCSN/ESPN3	(2)	vs. (7) Northern Illinois; Quarterfinals	W 79–62	21–10	Quicken Loans Arena (2,311); Cleveland, OH
03/11/2016; 9:05 pm, BCSN/ESPN3	(2)	vs. (3) Buffalo; Semifinals	L 74–88	21–11	Quicken Loans Arena (6,427); Cleveland, OH
CBI
03/16/2016*; 7:00 pm		Albany; First round	W 94–90 ^{OT}	22–11	Convocation Center (3,034); Athens, OH
03/21/2016*; 7:00 pm		UNC Greensboro; Quarterfinals	W 72–67	23–11	Convocation Center (3,567); Athens, OH
03/23/2016*; 7:00 pm		Morehead State; Semifinals	L 72–77	23–12	Convocation Center (3,712); Athens, OH
*Non-conference game. ^{#}Rankings from AP Poll. (#) Tournament seedings in parentheses. All times are in Eastern Time.

== Statistics ==
=== Team statistics ===
Final 2015–16 statistics

Record	Ohio	OPP
Scoring	2746	2617
Scoring Average	78.46	74.77
Field goals – Att	937–1993	919–2117
3-pt. Field goals – Att	296–767	261–720
Free throws – Att	576–759	518–704
Rebounds	1251	1197
Assists	487	412
Turnovers	414	356
Steals	157	209
Blocked Shots	128	89

=== Player statistics ===
			Minutes		Scoring		Total FGs			3-point FGs			Free-Throws			Rebounds								
Player	GP	GS	Tot	Avg	Pts	Avg	FG	FGA	Pct	3FG	3FA	Pct	FT	FTA	Pct	Off	Def	Tot	Avg	A	PF	TO	Stl	Blk
Antonio Campbell	35	35	1013	28.9	598	17.1	237	423	0.56	43	117	0.368	81	111	0.73	74	283	357	10.2	23	111	44	23	63
Jaaron Simmons	35	34	1276	36.5	542	15.5	172	370	0.465	32	78	0.41	166	213	0.779	9	115	124	3.5	275	108	136	29	0
Treg Setty	35	35	985	28.1	420	12	155	319	0.486	32	86	0.372	78	108	0.722	51	127	178	5.1	30	97	55	29	9
Kenny Kaminski	33	33	1004	30.4	416	12.6	132	341	0.387	83	229	0.362	69	80	0.863	13	110	123	3.7	41	73	38	17	10
Jordan Dartis	32	26	1015	31.7	315	9.8	97	198	0.49	67	140	0.479	54	61	0.885	4	61	65	2	40	58	32	24	2
Gavin Block	34	2	611	18	172	5.1	48	121	0.397	23	65	0.354	53	64	0.828	7	64	71	2.1	52	54	31	13	1
Wadly Mompremier	30	0	272	9.1	78	2.6	27	49	0.551	2	5	0.4	22	46	0.478	32	60	92	3.1	3	35	18	4	34
Khari Harley	20	9	284	14.2	64	3.2	19	54	0.352	6	22	0.273	20	29	0.69	7	21	28	1.4	9	26	13	9	4
Mike Laster	33	0	309	9.4	64	1.9	25	57	0.439	1	8	0.125	13	18	0.722	13	16	29	0.9	4	28	17	2	0
Doug Taylor	29	1	148	5.1	45	1.6	15	32	0.469	1	2	0.5	14	19	0.737	24	30	54	1.9	3	30	6	5	5
James Gollon	20	0	109	5.5	21	1.1	6	18	0.333	4	11	0.364	5	8	0.625	2	12	14	0.7	5	11	15	2	0
Drew Crabtree	9	0	9	1	6	0.7	2	4	0.5	2	4	0.5	0	0	0	1	2	3	0.3	1	1	0	0	0
Jaylin McDonald	8	0	7	0.9	3	0.4	1	1	1	0	0	0	1	2	0.5	0	0	0	0	1	0	0	0	0
Sam Frayer	10	0	8	0.8	2	0.2	1	5	0.2	0	0	0	0	0	0	3	1	4	0.4	0	0	1	0	0
Total	35	-	7050	-	2746	78.5	937	1993	0.470	296	767	0.386	576	759	0.759	289	962	1251	35.7	487	632	414	157	128
Opponents	35	-	7050	-	2617	74.8	919	2117	0.434	261	720	0.363	518	704	0.736	326	871	1197	34.2	412	690	356	209	89

Legend
GP	Games played	GS	Games started	Avg	Average per game
FG	Field-goals made	FGA	Field-goal attempts	Off	Offensive rebounds
Def	Defensive rebounds	A	Assists	TO	Turnovers
Blk	Blocks	Stl	Steals	High	Team high

== Awards and honors ==
=== All-MAC Awards ===
Postseason All-MAC teams
Team	Player	Position	Year
MAC Player of the Year	Antonio Campbell	C	Jr.
All-MAC First Team	Antonio Campbell	C	Jr.
All-MAC Second Team	Jaaron Simmons	G	RS-So.
All-MAC Freshman Team	Jordan Dartis	G	Fr.

== See also ==
- 2015–16 Ohio Bobcats women's basketball team
