= 2016 MAC men's basketball tournament =

- Classification: Division I
- Season: 2015–16
- Teams: 12
- Site: Quicken Loans Arena; Cleveland, Ohio
- First round site: Campus sites
- Champions: Buffalo (2nd title)
- Winning coach: Nate Oats (1st title)
- MVP: Willie Conner (Buffalo)
- Television: TWCSC (Ohio), ESPN2
- MAC men's basketball tournaments

2015–16 Mid-American Conference men's basketball standings
	Conf.				Overall
Team	W		L	PCT	W		L	PCT
East
Akron	13	–	5	.722	26	–	9	.743
Ohio	11	–	7	.611	23	–	12	.657
Kent State	10	–	8	.556	19	–	13	.594
Buffalo †	10	–	8	.556	20	–	15	.571
Miami (OH)	6	–	12	.333	13	–	20	.394
Bowling Green	5	–	13	.278	16	–	18	.471
West
Ball State	10	–	8	.556	21	–	14	.600
Central Michigan	10	–	8	.556	17	–	16	.515
Northern Illinois	9	–	9	.500	21	–	13	.618
Eastern Michigan	9	–	9	.500	18	–	15	.545
Toledo	8	–	10	.444	17	–	15	.531
Western Michigan	7	–	11	.389	13	–	19	.406
† 2016 MAC tournament winner

The 2016 Mid-American Conference men's basketball tournament was the post-season men's basketball tournament for the Mid-American Conference (MAC) 2015–16 college basketball season. Tournament first-round games were held on campus sites at the higher seed on March 7. The remaining rounds were held at Quicken Loans Arena in Cleveland between March 10–12. Buffalo won the tournament and received the conference's automatic bid into the 2016 NCAA tournament where they lost to Miami (FL) in the first round.

== Format ==
In 2016, the tournament reverted to its original structure with the top four seeds receiving just one bye into the quarterfinals. From 2012 to 2015, the top two seeds received byes into the semifinals while the third and fourth seeds received a bye to the quarterfinals.

== Seeds ==
Seed	School	Conference record	Division	Tiebreaker
1 †	Akron	13–5	East	
2 †	Ohio	11–7	East	
3 †	Buffalo	10–8	East	No. 1: 4–0 vs. tied teams (2–0 vs. KSU, 1–0 vs. BSU, 1–0 vs. CMU)
4 †	Central Michigan	10–8	West	No. 1: 2–2 vs. tied teams (0–1 vs. Buffalo, 1–0 vs. KSU, 1–1 vs. BSU); No. 2: 2–1 vs. tied teams (1–0 vs. KSU, 1–1 vs. BSU)
5	Kent State	10–8	East	No. 1: 1–3 vs. tied teams (0–2 vs. Buffalo, 1–0 vs. BSU, 0–1 vs. CMU); No. 2: 1–1 vs. tied teams (1–0 vs. BSU, 0–1 vs. CMU); No. 3: 1–0 vs. BSU
6	Ball State	10–8	West	No. 1: 1–3 vs. tied teams (0–1 vs. Buffalo, 0–1 vs. Kent State, 1–1 vs. CMU); No. 2: 1–2 vs. tied teams (0–1 vs. KSU, 1–1 vs. CMU); No. 3: 0–1 vs. KSU
7	Northern Illinois	9–9	West	No. 1: 1–1 vs. EMU; No. 2: 1–1 vs. No. 1 Akron
8	Eastern Michigan	9–9	West	No. 1: 1–1 vs. NIU; No. 2: 0–1 vs. No. 1 Akron
9	Toledo	8–10	West	
10	Western Michigan	7–11	West	
11	Miami (OH)	6–12	East	
12	Bowling Green	5–13	East	
† Received a bye to quarterfinals

== Schedule ==
Game	Time	Matchup^{#}	Television
First round – Monday March 7
1	7:00 pm	No. 12 Bowling Green 70 at No. 5 Kent State 69	ESPN3
2	7:00 pm	No. 11 Miami (OH) 49 at No. 6 Ball State 47	ESPN3
3	7:30 pm	No. 9 Toledo 60 at No. 8 Eastern Michigan 69	ESPN3
4	8:00 pm	No. 10 Western Michigan 50 at No. 7 Northern Illinois 56	ESPN3
Quarterfinals – Thursday March 10
5	Noon	No. 8 Eastern Michigan 63 vs. No. 1 Akron 65	TWC SportsChannel OH/BCSN; ESPN3
6	2:30 pm	No. 12 Bowling Green 62 vs. No. 4 Central Michigan 59	TWC SportsChannel OH/BCSN; ESPN3
7	6:30 pm	No. 7 Northern Illinois 62 vs. No. 2 Ohio 79	TWC SportsChannel OH/BCSN; ESPN3
8	9:00 pm	No. 11 Miami (OH) 81 vs. No. 3 Buffalo 94	TWC SportsChannel OH/BCSN; ESPN3
Semifinals – Friday March 11
9	6:30 pm	No. 12 Bowling Green 66 vs. No. 1 Akron 80	TWC SportsChannel OH/BCSN; ESPN3
10	9:00 pm	No. 3 Buffalo 88 vs. No. 2 Ohio 74	TWC SportsChannel OH/BCSN; ESPN3
Championship – Saturday March 12
11	7:30 pm	No. 3 Buffalo 64 vs. No. 1 Akron 61	ESPN2
* Game times in ET. # Rankings denote tournament seed

== Bracket ==
First round Monday, March 7
7	Northern Illinois	56
10	Western Michigan	50
6	Ball State	47
11	Miami (OH)	49
8	Eastern Michigan	69
9	Toledo	60
5	Kent State	69
12	Bowling Green	70

Quarterfinals; Thursday, March 10
2	Ohio	79
7	Northern Illinois	62
3	Buffalo	94
11	Miami (OH)	81
1	Akron	65
8	Eastern Michigan	63
4	Central Michigan	59
12	Bowling Green	62

Semifinals; Friday, March 11
2	Ohio	74
3	Buffalo	88
1	Akron	80
12	Bowling Green	66

Championship; Saturday, March 12
3	Buffalo	64
1	Akron	61

First round games at campus sites of lower-numbered seeds

== All-Tournament Team ==
Tournament MVP – Willie Conner, Buffalo

Player	Team
Isaiah Johnson	Akron
Antonio Campbell	Ohio
Lamonte Bearden	Buffalo
Willie Conner	Buffalo
C.J. Massinburg	Buffalo

== See also ==
- 2016 MAC women's basketball tournament
