= Franko House =

American basketball player (born 1994)

Personal information
- Born: September 19, 1994 (age 32) Elkhart, Indiana, U.S.
- Listed height: 6 ft 5.5 in (1.97 m)
- Listed weight: 248 lb (112 kg)

Career information
- High school: Concord (Elkhart, Indiana)
- College: Ball State (2013–2017)
- NBA draft: 2017: undrafted
- Playing career: 2017–2019
- Position: Small forward / Power forward

Career history
- 2017–2019: Landstede Hammers
- 2019: Alaska Aces

Career highlights
- Dutch League champion (2019); Dutch Supercup champion (2019); Second-team All-MAC (2016); Third-team All-MAC (2017); MAC All-Defensive Team (2016)

Frankie Stanton House (born September 19, 1994) is an American former professional basketball player. He also played American football as a tight end. He played college basketball at Ball State University, and signed with the Chicago Bears as an undrafted free agent in 2017.

== High school and college career ==
House played high school football and basketball at Concord High School where he was a 3-time Elkhart Truth All-Area First-team selection for basketball and played for the Indiana Elite AAU program while also playing tight end and defensive end.

House signed with Ball State in 2013 where he played in all 30 games and made 21 starts for the Cardinals.

In 2014–2015, House played in all 30 games and made 29 starts for the Cardinals, where he averaged 10.3 points, 5.5 rebounds and 2.4 assists per game, ranking within the top three on the Cardinals roster in all three categories. House also ranked ninth in the MAC for overall field goal percentage.

In 2015–2016, House was selected to both the all-MAC second-team and MAC all-defensive team.

Following the season, House was worked out by the Chicago Bears and declared for the 2017 NFL draft.

== Professional career ==
=== Chicago Bears ===
Despite not playing football at Ball State, House signed with the Chicago Bears as an undrafted free agent tight end on May 11, 2017. He was waived by the Bears on May 31, 2017.

== Basketball career ==
=== Landstede Hammers ===
House signed with the Landstede Hammers in 2017 and left the squad in 2019.

=== Alaska Aces ===
House signed with the Alaska Aces on October 3, 2019, for the PBA Governor's Cup. On October 13, House grabbed a career-high 23 rebounds to go along with 22 points in a 78–71 win over the Rain or Shine Elasto Painters.

== Career statistics ==
=== Professional ===
Legend
GP	Games played	MPG	Minutes per game	FG%	Field goal percentage
3P%	3-point field goal percentage	FT%	Free throw percentage	RPG	Rebounds per game
APG	Assists per game	SPG	Steals per game	BPG	Blocks per game
PPG	Points per game	**Bold**	Career high		Led the league

Year	Team	League	GP	MPG	FG%	3P%	FT%	RPG	APG	SPG	BPG	PPG
2017–18	Landstede Hammers	Dutch League	35	24.1	**.515**	**.395**	.757	6.2	1.3	**.9**	.3	12.3
2018–19	Landstede Hammers	Dutch League	15	23.3	.462	.160	.750	6.8	1.7	.7	.2	10.2
2019	Alaska Aces	PBA	9	**37.7**	.435	.143	**.818**	**13.0**	**3.6**	.2	**.9**	**17.4**
Career		All Leagues	59	26.0	.484	.286	.767	7.4	1.8	.8	.4	12.5
