= 2015–16 Northern Illinois Huskies men's basketball team =

American college basketball season

2015–16 Northern Illinois Huskies men's basketball

Vegas 16, Quarterfinals
- Conference: Mid-American Conference
- West Division
- Record: 21–13 (9–9 MAC)
- Head coach: Mark Montgomery (5th season)
- Assistant coach: Jon Borovich; Lou Dawkins; Jason Larson
- Home arena: Convocation Center

2015–16 Mid-American Conference men's basketball standings
	Conf.				Overall
Team	W		L	PCT	W		L	PCT
East
Akron	13	–	5	.722	26	–	9	.743
Ohio	11	–	7	.611	23	–	12	.657
Kent State	10	–	8	.556	19	–	13	.594
Buffalo †	10	–	8	.556	20	–	15	.571
Miami (OH)	6	–	12	.333	13	–	20	.394
Bowling Green	5	–	13	.278	16	–	18	.471
West
Ball State	10	–	8	.556	21	–	14	.600
Central Michigan	10	–	8	.556	17	–	16	.515
Northern Illinois	9	–	9	.500	21	–	13	.618
Eastern Michigan	9	–	9	.500	18	–	15	.545
Toledo	8	–	10	.444	17	–	15	.531
Western Michigan	7	–	11	.389	13	–	19	.406
† 2016 MAC tournament winner

The 2015–16 Northern Illinois Huskies men's basketball team represented Northern Illinois University during the 2015–16 NCAA Division I men's basketball season. The Huskies, led by fifth year head coach Mark Montgomery, played their home games at the Convocation Center as members of the West Division of the Mid-American Conference. They finished the season 21–13, 9–9 in MAC play to finish in a tie for third place in the West Division. They defeated Western Michigan in the first round of the MAC tournament to advance to the quarterfinals where they lost to Ohio. They were invited to the inaugural Vegas 16, which only had eight teams, where they lost in the quarterfinals to UC Santa Barbara.

== Previous season ==
The Huskies finished the season 14–16, 8–10 in MAC play to finish in a tie for fourth place in the West Division. They lost in the first round of the MAC tournament to Akron.

== Departures ==
Name	Number	Pos.	Height	Weight	Year	Hometown	Notes
Pete Rakocevic	0	C	6'11"	245	RS Senior	Chicago, IL	Graduated
Aaron Armstead	2	G	6'4"	195	Senior	Chicago, IL	Graduated
Kevin Gray	13	F	6'8"	225	Senior	Chicago, IL	Graduated & transferred to Minnesota State
Keith Gray	21	F	6'8"	225	RS Junior	Chicago, IL	Graduated & transferred to Flagler College
Anthony Johnson	33	G	6'3"	190	RS Senior	Chicago, IL	Graduated
Jordan Threloff	42	F	6'9"	255	RS Senior	DeKalb, IL	Graduated

=== Incoming transfers ===
Name	Number	Pos.	Height	Weight	Year	Hometown	Previous School
Andrew Zelis	32	C	7'0"	245	Junior	Wheaton, IL	Junior college transferred from Kaskaskia College

== Recruiting class of 2015 ==
College recruiting information
Name	Hometown	School	Height	Weight	Commit date
Marshawn Wilson #27 PG	Oakdale, MN	Hill-Murray School	6 ft 3 in (1.91 m)	185 lb (84 kg)	Mar 31, 2015
Marshawn Wilson #27 PG	Recruit ratings: Scout: Rivals: (80)				
Jaylen Key #39 PF	Milwaukee, WI	Homestead High School	6 ft 6 in (1.98 m)	210 lb (95 kg)	Sep 7, 2014
Jaylen Key #39 PF	Recruit ratings: Scout: Rivals: (79)				
Levi Bradley; SF	Milwaukee, WI	Pius XI High School	6 ft 5 in (1.96 m)	170 lb (77 kg)	Sep 7, 2014
Levi Bradley; SF	Recruit ratings: Scout: Rivals: (79)				
Laytwan Porter; PG	Rockford, IL	Auburn High School	6 ft 0 in (1.83 m)	170 lb (77 kg)	Sep 8, 2014
Laytwan Porter; PG	Recruit ratings: Scout: Rivals: (NR)				
Austin Pauga; SG	Naperville, IL	IMG Academy	6 ft 6 in (1.98 m)	205 lb (93 kg)	Oct 14, 2014
Austin Pauga; SG	Recruit ratings: Scout: Rivals: (NR)				
Overall recruit ranking:
Note: In many cases, Scout, Rivals, 247Sports, On3, and ESPN may conflict in their listings of height and weight.; In these cases, the average was taken. ESPN grades are on a 100-point scale.; Sources: "2015 Team Ranking". Rivals.

=== Recruiting class of 2016 ===
College recruiting information (2016)
Name	Hometown	School	Height	Weight	Commit date
Eugene German; PG	Gary, IN	21st Century Charter School	6 ft 1 in (1.85 m)	150 lb (68 kg)	Jun 21, 2015
Eugene German; PG	Recruit ratings: Scout: Rivals: (NR)				
Noah McCarty; PF	Sterling, IL	Newman Central Catholic High School	6 ft 8 in (2.03 m)	220 lb (100 kg)	Aug 9, 2015
Noah McCarty; PF	Recruit ratings: Scout: Rivals: (NR)				
Nick Wagner; PG	Galesville, WI	Gale-Ettrick-Trempealeau High School	6 ft 3 in (1.91 m)	180 lb (82 kg)	Sep 6, 2015
Nick Wagner; PG	Recruit ratings: Scout: Rivals: (NR)				
Overall recruit ranking:
Note: In many cases, Scout, Rivals, 247Sports, On3, and ESPN may conflict in their listings of height and weight.; In these cases, the average was taken. ESPN grades are on a 100-point scale.; Sources: "2016 Team Ranking". Rivals.

== Roster ==
2015–16 Northern Illinois Huskies men's basketball team
Players
Coaches

Pos.	#	Name	Height	Weight	Year	Previous school	Hometown
G	0	Marshawn Wilson	6 ft 3 in (1.91 m)	205 lb (93 kg)	Fr	Hill-Murray	Oakdale, MN
G	2	Laytwan Porter	6 ft 2 in (1.88 m)	185 lb (84 kg)	Fr	Auburn	Rockford, IL
G	3	Dontel Highsmith	6 ft 2 in (1.88 m)	200 lb (91 kg)	Jr	Dowagiac	Dowagiac, MI
G	5	Travon Baker	5 ft 10 in (1.78 m)	170 lb (77 kg)	Sr	Detroit Consortium	Detroit, MI
G/F	10	Darrell Bowie	6 ft 7 in (2.01 m)	220 lb (100 kg)	Sr	La Jolla Prep	Milwaukee, WI
G/F	11	Chuks Iroegbu	6 ft 4 in (1.93 m)	210 lb (95 kg)	RS Sr	Franklin HS; Washington State	Elk Grove, CA
G	12	Jordan Thomas (W)	5 ft 11 in (1.8 m)	185 lb (84 kg)	So	Menomonee Falls (WI)	Northfield, IL
F	15	Jaylen Key	6 ft 8 in (2.03 m)	220 lb (100 kg)	Fr	Homestead	Mequon, WI
G	23	Aaric Armstead	6 ft 5 in (1.96 m)	195 lb (88 kg)	Jr	La Jolla Prep	Chicago, IL
G	24	Michael Orris	6 ft 2 in (1.88 m)	200 lb (91 kg)	RS Jr	Crete-Monee; Kansas State	Crete, IL
G	25	Jay DeHaan (W)	6 ft 2 in (1.88 m)	185 lb (84 kg)	So	Waubonsie Valley	Naperville, IL
G	31	Austin Pauga	6 ft 6 in (1.98 m)	210 lb (95 kg)	Fr	IMG Academy	Naperville, IL
C	32	Andrew Zelis	7 ft 0 in (2.13 m)	255 lb (116 kg)	Jr	Wheaton North; Kaskaskia College	Wheaton, IL
G	33	Jon Siu (W)	6 ft 5 in (1.96 m)	255 lb (116 kg)	Fr	Middlesex School	Hong Kong
C	34	Marin Maric	6 ft 10 in (2.08 m)	250 lb (113 kg)	Jr	La Lumiere School	Split, Croatia
G/F	42	Levi Bradley	6 ft 7 in (2.01 m)	200 lb (91 kg)	Fr	Pius XI	Milwaukee, WI

Head coach

- Mark Montgomery (Michigan State)

Assistant coach(es)

- Jon Borovich (Central Michigan)
- Lou Dawkins (Tulsa)
- Jason Larson (Grand Valley State)

Legend

- (C) Team captain
- (S) Suspended
- (I) Ineligible
- (W) Walk-on
- Injured
- Current redshirt

Roster

== Schedule ==
Date time, TV	Opponent	Result	Record	Site (attendance) city, state
Non-conference regular season
11/13/2015*; 7:00 pm, ESPN3	Cal State Northridge; NIU Showcase	W 83–71	1–0	Convocation Center (995); DeKalb, IL
11/14/2015*; 3:30 pm	South Dakota; NIU Showcase	W 72–65	2–0	Convocation Center (913); DeKalb, IL
11/15/2015*; 3:30 pm, ESPN3	Wright State; NIU Showcase	W 65–59	3–0	Convocation Center (888); DeKalb, IL
11/21/2015*; 1:00 pm	Eureka	W 100–52	4–0	Convocation Center (457); DeKalb, IL
11/25/2015*; 7:00 pm	Indiana Northwest	W 87–55	5–0	Convocation Center (578); DeKalb, IL
11/28/2015*; 9:00 pm	at Idaho	W 66–59	6–0	Memorial Gym (571); Moscow, ID
12/02/2015*; 7:00 pm, ESPN3	Chicago State	W 80–58	7–0	Convocation Center (1,047); DeKalb, IL
12/04/2015*; 7:00 pm	at Missouri	L 71–78	7–1	Mizzou Arena (6,214); Columbia, MO
12/16/2015*; 6:00 pm, BTN	at Ohio State	L 54–67	7–2	Value City Arena (12,880); Columbus, OH
12/19/2015*; 2:00 pm	FIU	W 78–75 ^{2OT}	8–2	Convocation Center (959); DeKalb, IL
12/22/2015*; 7:00 pm	Roosevelt	W 85–52	9–2	Convocation Center (823); DeKalb, IL
12/29/2015*; 7:00 pm	at UIC	W 70–65	10–2	UIC Pavilion (2,349); Chicago, IL
01/02/2016*; 1:00 pm	Judson	W 91–48	11–2	Convocation Center (1,073); DeKalb, IL
MAC Regular season
01/06/2016; 7:00 pm, ESPN3	Ohio	W 80–69	12–2 (1–0)	Convocation Center (1,038); DeKalb, IL
01/09/2016; 7:30 pm, ESPN3	Eastern Michigan	W 80–63	13–2 (2–0)	Convocation Center (1,349); DeKalb, IL
01/12/2016; 6:00 pm, ESPN3	at Toledo	W 71–66	14–2 (3–0)	Savage Arena (4,271); Toledo, OH
01/16/2016; 6:00 pm, ESPN3	at Western Michigan	L 69–83	14–3 (3–1)	University Arena (2,649); Kalamazoo, MI
01/19/2016; 7:00 pm, ESPN3	Central Michigan	W 75–70	15–3 (4–1)	Convocation Center (1,497); DeKalb, IL
01/22/2016; 5:30 pm, CBSSN	Toledo	W 58–49	16–3 (5–1)	Convocation Center (3,166); DeKalb, IL
01/26/2016; 6:00 pm	at Akron	L 66–76	16–4 (5–2)	James A. Rhodes Arena (3,205); Akron, OH
01/30/2016; 2:30 pm, ESPN3	at Miami (OH)	L 59–72	16–5 (5–3)	Millett Hall (1,297); Oxford, OH
02/02/2016; 8:00 pm, ASN	Buffalo	L 78–90	16–6 (5–4)	Convocation Center (1,494); DeKalb, IL
02/06/2016; 1:00 pm	at Ohio	L 69–80	16–7 (5–5)	Convocation Center (8,773); Athens, OH
02/09/2016; 6:00 pm	at Kent State	L 74–75	16–8 (5–6)	MAC Center (2,764); Kent, OH
02/13/2016; 4:45 pm, ESPN3	Akron	W 80–79	17–8 (6–6)	Convocation Center (3,457); DeKalb, IL
02/16/2016; 7:00 pm, ESPN3	Bowling Green	W 71–60	18–8 (7–6)	Convocation Center (1,148); DeKalb, IL
02/19/2016; 5:30 pm, CBSSN	at Ball State	L 59–63	18–9 (7–7)	John E. Worthen Arena (5,160); Muncie, IN
02/23/2016; 6:00 pm, ESPN3	at Central Michigan	L 64–76	18–10 (7–8)	McGuirk Arena (2,371); Mount Pleasant, MI
02/27/2016; 3:30 pm, ESPN3	Western Michigan	W 76–67	19–10 (8–8)	Convocation Center (3,019); DeKalb, IL
03/01/2016; 6:00 pm, ESPN3	at Eastern Michigan	L 71–75	19–11 (8–9)	Convocation Center (993); Ypsilanti, MI
03/04/2016; 6:00 pm, CBSSN	Ball State	W 80–69	20–11 (9–9)	Convocation Center (2,102); DeKalb, IL
MAC tournament
03/07/2016; 7:00 pm, ESPN3	Western Michigan; First round	W 56–50	21–11	Convocation Center (1,594); DeKalb, IL
03/10/2016; 5:30 pm, ESPN3	vs. Ohio; Quarterfinals	L 62–79	21–12	Quicken Loans Arena (2,311); Cleveland, OH
Vegas 16
03/28/2016*; 4:30 pm, CBSSN	vs. UC Santa Barbara; Quarterfinals	L 63–70	21–13	Mandalay Bay Events Center; Paradise, NV
*Non-conference game. ^{#}Rankings from AP Poll. (#) Tournament seedings in parentheses. All times are in Central Time.
