= Jonathan Williams (basketball, born 1995) =

American basketball player

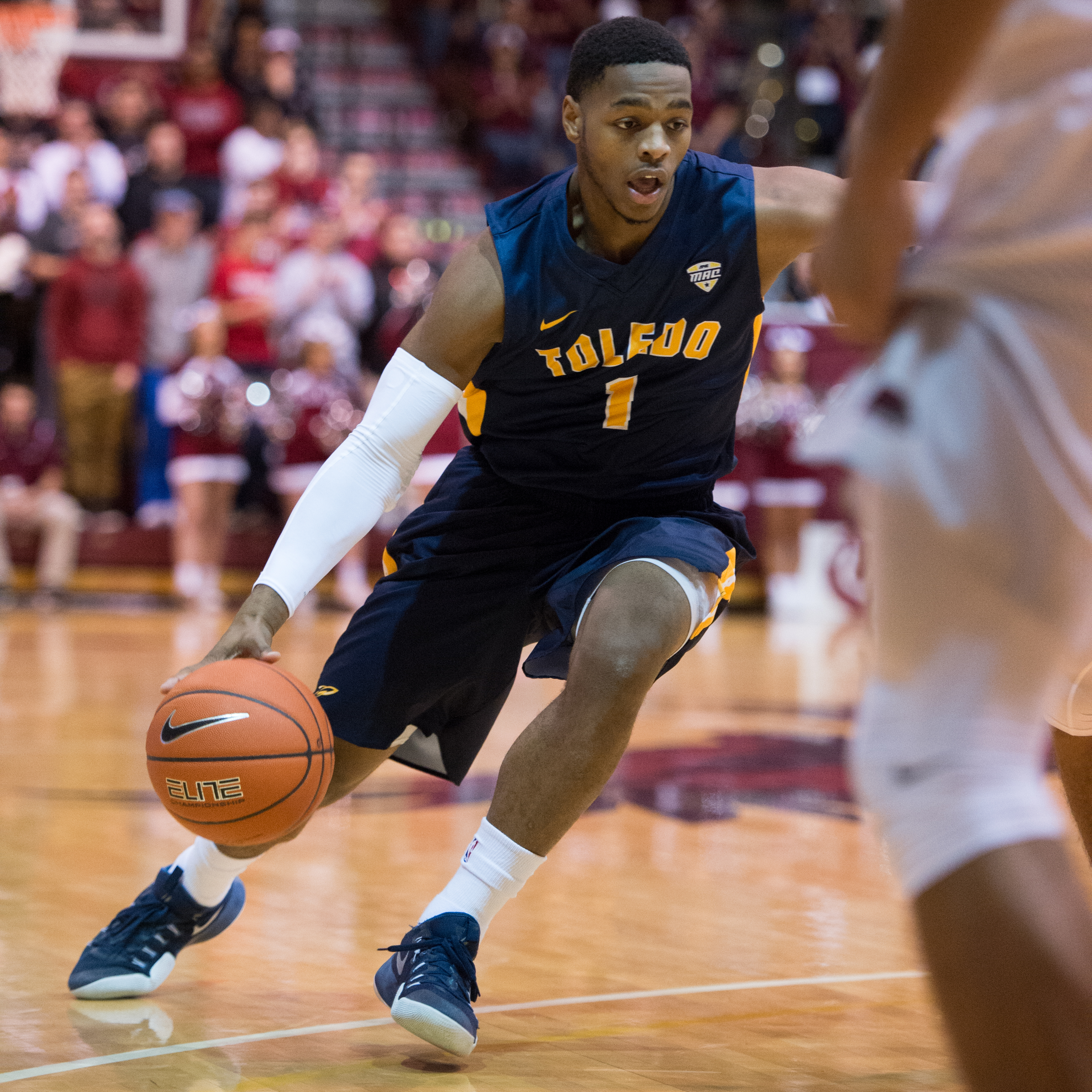
- Williams with Toledo in 2016

Personal information
- Born: February 25, 1995 (age 31) Farmington, Michigan
- Listed height: 6 ft 3 in (1.91 m)
- Listed weight: 180 lb (82 kg)

Career information
- High school: Southfield-Lathrup (Southfield, Michigan)
- College: Toledo (2013–2017)
- NBA draft: 2017: undrafted
- Playing career: 2017–2023
- Position: Point guard / shooting guard

Career history
- 2017–2018: GTK Gliwice
- 2018–2019: Okapi Aalstar
- 2019–2020: Polpharma Starogard Gdański
- 2021: Sheffield Sharks
- 2021–2022: GTK Gliwice
- 2022–2023: BK Olomoucko
- 2023: KW Titans

Jonathan Edward Williams (born February 25, 1995), also known by his nickname "Jon-Jon", is an American former professional basketball player. Williams played four seasons of college basketball for Toledo before starting a professional career in Europe.

As a senior at Toledo, Williams averaged 19.6 points per game. He was named to the Third Team All-MAC.

== Professional career ==
In his first professional season, Williams played with GTK Gliwice of the Polish Basketball League.

On August 1, 2018, Williams signed a one-year contract with Crelan Okapi Aalstar of the Belgian Pro Basketball League.

On October 19, 2019, he has signed with Polpharma Starogard Gdański of the Polska Liga Koszykówki (PLK).

Williams began the 2021–22 season with the Sheffield Sharks of the British Basketball League and averaged 16.4 points, 4.0 rebounds, and 2.3 assists per game. On December 27, 2021, he has signed with GTK Gliwice of the Polish Basketball League.
