= Isaiah Johnson (basketball) =

American basketball player (born 1994)

Personal information
- Born: November 7, 1994 (age 32) Cincinnati, Ohio, U.S.
- Listed height: 6 ft 10 in (2.08 m)
- Listed weight: 290 lb (132 kg)

Career information
- High school: Walnut Hills (Cincinnati, Ohio)
- College: Akron (2013–2017)
- NBA draft: 2017: undrafted
- Playing career: 2017–present
- Position: Center

Career history
- 2017: KFUM Nässjö
- 2019: Sudbury Five

Career highlights
- AP Honorable Mention All-American (2017); MAC Player of the Year (2017); 2× First-team All-MAC (2016, 2017); MAC Sixth Man of the Year (2016)

Isaiah Johnson (born November 7, 1994) is an American basketball player. He played college basketball at the University of Akron, where he was named the Mid-American Conference Player of the Year for the 2016–17 season.

== Early life ==
Johnson was born in Cincinnati, Ohio, where he attended Walnut Hills High School. He played basketball and football at Walnut Hills.

== College career ==
Johnson was recruited by college coaches in both sports, but opted to play basketball at Akron. After two seasons in a reserve role, Johnson became a key player off the bench for the Zips as a junior in 2015–16, averaging 13.6 points and 7.6 rebounds per game and was named first-team All-Mid-American Conference (MAC) and the MAC Sixth Man of the Year.

As a senior in the 2016–17 season, Johnson entered the starting lineup full-time. He averaged 16.6 points and 7.1 rebounds and provided one of the season's highlights when he uncharacteristically hit a buzzer-beating three-pointer to beat Ball State. He led the Zips to a second consecutive MAC regular season title and was named the conference player of the year.

== Professional career ==
=== KFUM Nässjö ===
Johnson began his professional career in the 2017–18 season with KFUM Nässjö of the Swedish Basketligan. He played eight games for Nässjö before leaving in November 2017. He averaged 10.5 points, 6.8 rebounds, 1.3 assists and 1.1 steals per game.

=== Sudbury Five ===
On January 12, 2019, Johnson joined the Sudbury Five of the National Basketball League of Canada. In 15 games to finish the 2018–19 season, he averaged 7.1 points and 4.3 rebounds per game.

== Personal life ==
Johnson is the son of Walter Johnson IV and Yvonne Cook. He has six siblings. His grandfather is former Cleveland Browns football player Walter Johnson III.
