= 2007–08 Mid-American Conference men's basketball season =

- League: NCAA Division I
- Sport: Basketball
- Teams: 12

Regular season
- League champions: Kent State
- Runners-up: Western Michigan
- Season MVP: Al Fisher

Tournament
- Champions: Kent State
- Runners-up: Akron
- Finals MVP: Haminn Quaintance

Mid-American men's basketball seasons
- ← 2006–07 2008–09 →

2007–08 Mid-American Conference men's basketball standings
| | Conf. | | | | Overall |
| Team | W | | L | PCT | W | | L | PCT |
|---|---|---|---|---|---|---|---|---|
East
| Kent State † | 13 | – | 3 | .813 | 28 | – | 7 | .800 |
| Akron | 11 | – | 5 | .688 | 24 | – | 11 | .686 |
| Ohio | 9 | – | 7 | .563 | 20 | – | 13 | .606 |
| Miami (OH) | 9 | – | 7 | .563 | 17 | – | 16 | .515 |
| Bowling Green | 7 | – | 9 | .438 | 13 | – | 16 | .448 |
| Buffalo | 3 | – | 13 | .188 | 10 | – | 20 | .333 |
West
| Western Michigan | 12 | – | 4 | .750 | 20 | – | 12 | .625 |
| Central Michigan | 8 | – | 8 | .500 | 14 | – | 17 | .452 |
| Eastern Michigan | 8 | – | 8 | .500 | 14 | – | 17 | .452 |
| Toledo | 7 | – | 8 | .467 | 11 | – | 19 | .367 |
| Ball State | 5 | – | 11 | .313 | 6 | – | 24 | .200 |
| Northern Illinois | 3 | – | 12 | .200 | 6 | – | 22 | .214 |
† 2008 MAC tournament winner Rankings from AP Poll

The 2007–08 Mid-American Conference men's basketball season began with practices in October 2007, followed by the start of the 2007–08 NCAA Division I men's basketball season in November. Conference play began in January 2008 and concluded in March 2008. Kent State won the regular season title with a conference record of 13–3 over second-place Western Michigan. Kent State defeated third-seeded Akron in the MAC tournament final and represented the MAC in the NCAA tournament. As the nine seed in the Midwest Region they lost in the first round to UNLV.

== Preseason awards ==
The preseason poll was announced by the league office on October 18, 2007.

=== Preseason men's basketball poll ===
(First place votes in parentheses)

==== East Division ====
1. Kent State (10) 147
2. Miami (9) 146
3. Ohio (8) 131
4. Akron (5) 128
5. Buffalo 52
6. Bowling Green 47

==== West Division ====
1. Western Michigan (23) 173
2. Toledo (6) 144
3. Central Michigan (3) 131
4. Eastern Michigan 92
5. Northern Illinois 58
6. Ball State 53

==== Tournament champs ====
Kent State (7), Western Michigan (6), Ohio (5), Miami (5), Akron (4), Toledo (3), Bowling Green (1)

=== Honors ===
| Honor | Recipient |
|---|---|
| Preseason All-MAC East | Jeremiah Wood, Akron |
| Preseason All-MAC East | Mike Scott, Kent State |
| Preseason All-MAC East | Tim Pollitz, Miami |
| Preseason All-MAC East | Leon Williams, Ohio |
| Preseason All-MAC East | Jerome Tillman, Ohio |
| Preseason All-MAC West | Peyton Stovall, Ball State |
| Preseason All-MAC West | Giordan Watson, Central Michigan |
| Preseason All-MAC West | Carlos Medlock, Eastern Michigan |
| Preseason All-MAC West | Kashif Payne, Toledo |
| Preseason All-MAC West | Joe Reitz, Western Michigan |

== Postseason ==
=== Postseason awards ===
1. Coach of the Year: Jim Christian, Kent State
2. Player of the Year: Al Fisher, Kent State
3. Freshman of the Year: Darion Anderson, Northern Illinois
4. Defensive Player of the Year: Haminn Quaintance, Kent State
5. Sixth Man of the Year: Brian Moten, Bowling Green

=== Honors ===
| Honor | Recipient |
|---|---|
| Postseason All-MAC First Team | Al Fisher, Kent State |
| Postseason All-MAC First Team | Tim Pollitz, Miami |
| Postseason All-MAC First Team | Leon Williams, Ohio |
| Postseason All-MAC First Team | Joe Reitz, Western Michigan |
| Postseason All-MAC First Team | David Kool, Western Michigan |
| Postseason All-MAC Second Team | Jeremiah Wood, Akron |
| Postseason All-MAC Second Team | Giordan Watson, Central Michigan |
| Postseason All-MAC Second Team | Haminn Quaintance, Kent State |
| Postseason All-MAC Second Team | Mike Scott, Kent State |
| Postseason All-MAC Second Team | Michael Bramos, Miami |
| Postseason All-MAC Honorable Mention | Nick Dials, Akron |
| Postseason All-MAC Honorable Mention | Anthony Newell, Ball State |
| Postseason All-MAC Honorable Mention | Peyton Stovall, Ball State |
| Postseason All-MAC Honorable Mention | Nate Miller, Bowling Green |
| Postseason All-MAC Honorable Mention | Andy Robinson, Buffalo |
| Postseason All-MAC Honorable Mention | Carlos Medlock, Eastern Michigan |
| Postseason All-MAC Honorable Mention | Chris Singletary, Kent State |
| Postseason All-MAC Honorable Mention | Kenny Hayes, Miami |
| Postseason All-MAC Honorable Mention | Jerome Tillman, Ohio |
| Postseason All-MAC Honorable Mention | Tyrone Kent, Toledo |
| All-MAC Freshman Team | Steve McNees, Akron |
| All-MAC Freshman Team | Melvin Goins, Ball State |
| All-MAC Freshman Team | Joe Jakubowski, Bowling Green |
| All-MAC Freshman Team | Jeremy Allen, Central Michigan |
| All-MAC Freshman Team | Darion Anderson, Northern Illinois |

== See also ==
2007–08 Mid-American Conference women's basketball season
