= 2005–06 Mid-American Conference men's basketball season =

- League: NCAA Division I
- Sport: Basketball
- Teams: 12

Regular season
- League champions: Kent State
- Season MVP: DeAndre Haynes

Tournament
- Champions: Miami
- Runners-up: Akron
- Finals MVP: Kevin Warzynski

Mid-American men's basketball seasons
- 2004–05 2006–07

2005–06 Mid-American Conference men's basketball standings
| | Conf. | | | | Overall |
| Team | W | | L | PCT | W | | L | PCT |
|---|---|---|---|---|---|---|---|---|
East
| Kent State † | 15 | – | 3 | .833 | 24 | – | 8 | .750 |
| Akron | 14 | – | 4 | .778 | 23 | – | 9 | .719 |
| Miami (OH) | 14 | – | 4 | .778 | 18 | – | 12 | .600 |
| Ohio | 10 | – | 8 | .556 | 19 | – | 11 | .633 |
| Buffalo | 8 | – | 10 | .444 | 19 | – | 13 | .594 |
| Bowling Green | 5 | – | 13 | .278 | 9 | – | 21 | .300 |
West
| Northern Illinois | 12 | – | 6 | .667 | 17 | – | 11 | .607 |
| Toledo | 10 | – | 8 | .556 | 20 | – | 10 | .667 |
| Western Michigan | 10 | – | 8 | .556 | 14 | – | 17 | .452 |
| Ball State | 6 | – | 12 | .333 | 10 | – | 18 | .357 |
| Eastern Michigan | 3 | – | 15 | .167 | 7 | – | 21 | .250 |
| Central Michigan | 1 | – | 17 | .056 | 4 | – | 24 | .143 |
† 2006 MAC tournament winner Rankings from AP Poll

The 2005–06 Mid-American Conference men's basketball season began with practices in October 2005, followed by the start of the 2005–06 NCAA Division I men's basketball season in November. Conference play began in January 2007 and concluded in March 2007. Kent State won the regular season title with a conference record of 15–3 over second-place Akron and Miami. Kent State defeated seventh-seeded Toledo in the MAC tournament final and represented the MAC in the NCAA tournament. There they lost in the first round to Pittsburgh.

The MAC went from 13 teams in 2004–05 to 12 with the departure of Marshall for Conference USA. This was the last change in the MAC's core membership for 20 years; its next such change was the arrival of UMass ahead of the 2025–26 season.

== Preseason awards ==
The preseason poll was announced by the league office on October 26, 2005.

=== Preseason men's basketball poll ===
(First place votes in parentheses)

==== East Division ====
1. Ohio (16) 153
2. Akron (6) 120
3. Miami (4) 85
4. Kent State 85
5. Buffalo 79
6. Bowling Green 45

==== West Division ====
1. Toledo (15) 135
2. Ball State (5) 127
3. Western Michigan (5) 114
4. Northern Illinois (1) 97
5. Eastern Michigan 54
6. Central Michigan 40

==== Tournament champs ====
Ohio (14), Akron (5), Ball State (4), Miami (2), Toledo (1)

=== Honors ===
| Honor | Recipient |
|---|---|
| Preseason All-MAC East | Leon Williams, Ohio |
| Preseason All-MAC East | Mychal Green, Ohio |
| Preseason All-MAC East | Romeo Travis, Akron |
| Preseason All-MAC East | Yassin Idbihi, Buffalo |
| Preseason All-MAC East | Kevin Warzynski, Kent State |
| Preseason All-MAC West | Mike McKinney, Northern Illinois |
| Preseason All-MAC West | John Bowler, Eastern Michigan |
| Preseason All-MAC West | Sammy Villegas, Toledo |
| Preseason All-MAC West | Peyton Stovall, Ball State |
| Preseason All-MAC West | Joe Reitz, Western Michigan |

== Postseason ==
=== Postseason awards ===
1. Coach of the Year: Jim Christian, Kent State
2. Player of the Year: DeAndre Haynes,
3. Freshman of the Year: Maurice Acker, Ball State
4. Defensive Player of the Year: James Hughes, Northern Illinois
5. Sixth Man of the Year: Kevin Warzynski, Kent State

== See also ==
2005–06 Mid-American Conference women's basketball season
