= 2007–08 Kent State Golden Flashes men's basketball team =

American college basketball season

2007–08 Kent State Golden Flashes men's basketball

MAC tournament champions MAC Regular season champions

NCAA tournament, first round
- Conference: Mid-American Conference
- East Division
- Record: 28–7 (13–3 MAC)
- Head coach: Jim Christian (6th season)
- Assistant coach: Geno Ford
- Home arena: Memorial Athletic and Convocation Center

2007–08 Mid-American Conference men's basketball standings
	Conf.				Overall
Team	W		L	PCT	W		L	PCT
East
Kent State †	13	–	3	.813	28	–	7	.800
Akron	11	–	5	.688	24	–	11	.686
Ohio	9	–	7	.563	20	–	13	.606
Miami (OH)	9	–	7	.563	17	–	16	.515
Bowling Green	7	–	9	.438	13	–	16	.448
Buffalo	3	–	13	.188	10	–	20	.333
West
Western Michigan	12	–	4	.750	20	–	12	.625
Central Michigan	8	–	8	.500	14	–	17	.452
Eastern Michigan	8	–	8	.500	14	–	17	.452
Toledo	7	–	8	.467	11	–	19	.367
Ball State	5	–	11	.313	6	–	24	.200
Northern Illinois	3	–	12	.200	6	–	22	.214
† 2008 MAC tournament winner Rankings from AP Poll

The 2007–08 Kent State Golden Flashes men's basketball team represented Kent State University in the 2007–08 college basketball season. The team was coached by Jim Christian and played their home games in the Memorial Athletic and Convocation Center. They were members of the Mid-American Conference. They finished the season 28–7, 13–3 in MAC play. The Golden Flashes won the MAC tournament to receive an automatic bid to the NCAA tournament. Kent State lost to UNLV in the opening round.

== Roster ==
2007–08 Kent State Golden Flashes men's basketball team
Players
Coaches

Pos.	#	Name	Height	Weight	Year	Hometown
F	0	Rashad Woods	6 ft 5 in (1.96 m)	—	Jr	Houston, TX
G	0	Tyree Evans	6 ft 3 in (1.91 m)	—	So
F	1	Haminn Quaintance	6 ft 8 in (2.03 m)	—	Sr	Sarasota, FL
G	2	Chris Singletary	6 ft 4 in (1.93 m)	—	So	Chicago, IL
G	5	Albert Fisher	6 ft 1 in (1.85 m)	—	Jr	Pennsauken, NJ
G	11	Jordan Mincy	5 ft 10 in (1.78 m)	—	Jr	Memphis, TN
G	22	Mike McKee	6 ft 5 in (1.96 m)	—	So
F	30	Frank Henery-Ala	6 ft 5 in (1.96 m)	—	So
G	32	Rodriguez Sherman	6 ft 2 in (1.88 m)	—	So
F	34	Julian Sullinger	6 ft 5 in (1.96 m)	—	Jr	Columbus, OH
C	55	Brandon Parks	6 ft 10 in (2.08 m)	—	So

Head coach

- Jim Christian (Rhode Island)

Assistant coach(es)

- Geno Ford (Ohio)

Legend

- (C) Team captain
- (S) Suspended
- (I) Ineligible
- (W) Walk-on
- Injured
- Current redshirt

Roster

== Schedule and results ==
Date time, TV	Rank^{#}	Opponent^{#}	Result	Record	Site (attendance) city, state
Non-conference regular season
Nov 10, 2007*		at Detroit	L 60–61	0–1	Calihan Hall (2,236); Detroit, Michigan
Nov 15, 2007*		Hampton	W 77–71	1–1	Memorial Athletic and Convocation Center (3,455); Kent, Ohio
Nov 18, 2007*		Coppin State	W 74–51	2–1	Memorial Athletic and Convocation Center (2,046); Kent, Ohio
Nov 20, 2007*		Longwood	W 80–62	3–1	Memorial Athletic and Convocation Center (2,879); Kent, Ohio
Nov 23, 2007*		vs. Xavier	L 65–78	3–2	Sears Centre; Hoffman Estates, Illinois
Nov 24, 2007*		vs. Illinois State	W 65–59	4–2	Sears Centre (4,000); Hoffman Estates, Illinois
Nov 28, 2007*		Saint Louis	W 81–40	5–2	Memorial Athletic and Convocation Center (3,678); Kent, Ohio
Dec 1, 2007*		at UNC Greensboro	W 71–64	6–2	Fleming Gymnasium (1,831); Greensboro, North Carolina
Dec 5, 2007*		at Youngstown State	W 59–52	7–2	Beeghly Center (3,562); Youngstown, Ohio
Dec 8, 2007*		George Mason	W 73–55	8–2	Memorial Athletic and Convocation Center (4,378); Kent, Ohio
Dec 20, 2007*		Purdue-Fort Wayne	W 72–70	9–2	Memorial Athletic and Convocation Center (2,507); Kent, Ohio
Dec 29, 2007*		Cleveland State	W 84–69	10–2	Memorial Athletic and Convocation Center (3,576); Kent, Ohio
Jan 2, 2008*		at No. 1 North Carolina	L 61–90	10–3	Dean Smith Center (20,356); Chapel Hill, North Carolina
MAC regular season
Jan 6, 2008		Buffalo	W 68–63	11–3 (1–0)	Memorial Athletic and Convocation Center (2,587); Kent, Ohio
Jan 9, 2008*		Texas A&M	W 61–50	12–3	Memorial Athletic and Convocation Center (2,142); Kent, Ohio
Jan 12, 2008		Bowling Green	W 63–49	13–3 (2–0)	Memorial Athletic and Convocation Center (3,175); Kent, Ohio
Jan 17, 2008		at Miami (OH)	W 74–62	14–3 (3–0)	Millett Hall (1,967); Oxford, Ohio
Jan 19, 2008		at Ohio	L 59–71	14–4 (3–1)	Convocation Center (7,718); Athens, Ohio
Jan 23, 2008		Akron	W 75–69	15–4 (4–1)	Memorial Athletic and Convocation Center (6,516); Kent, Ohio
Jan 27, 2008		Western Michigan	W 67–58	16–4 (5–1)	Memorial Athletic and Convocation Center (3,674); Kent, Ohio
Jan 30, 2008		at Eastern Michigan	W 77–67	17–4 (6–1)	Convocation Center (559); Ypsilanti, Michigan
Feb 2, 2008		at Toledo	L 56–59	17–5 (6–2)	John F. Savage Hall (4,552); Toledo, Ohio
Feb 6, 2008		Ball State	W 64–61 ^{OT}	18–5 (7–2)	Memorial Athletic and Convocation Center (3,086); Kent, Ohio
Feb 9, 2008		Northern Illinois	W 82–67	19–5 (8–2)	Memorial Athletic and Convocation Center (4,056); Kent, Ohio
Feb 12, 2008		at Central Michigan	W 79–66	20–5 (9–2)	Rose Arena (1,658); Mount Pleasant, Michigan
Feb 16, 2008		Ohio	W 72–62	21–5 (10–2)	Memorial Athletic and Convocation Center (6,130); Kent, Ohio
Feb 19, 2008		at Buffalo	W 76–66	22–5 (11–2)	Alumni Arena (1,206); Buffalo, New York
Feb 23, 2008*		at No. 23 Saint Mary's	W 65–57	23–5	McKeon Pavilion (3,500); Moraga, California
Mar 1, 2008	No. 23	at Bowling Green	L 83–89	23–6 (11–3)	Anderson Arena (1,464); Bowling Green, Ohio
Mar 4, 2008		Miami (OH)	W 50–39	24–6 (12–3)	Memorial Athletic and Convocation Center (5,476); Kent, Ohio
Mar 9, 2008		at Akron	W 61–58	25–6 (13–3)	James A. Rhodes Arena (5,607); Akron, Ohio
MAC tournament
Mar 13, 2008*	(1)	vs. (8) Toledo; Quarterfinals	W 77–57	26–6	Quicken Loans Arena; Cleveland, Ohio
Mar 14, 2008*	(1)	vs. (5) Miami (OH); Semifinals	W 49–47	27–6	Quicken Loans Arena; Cleveland, Ohio
Mar 15, 2008*	(1)	vs. (3) Akron; Championship	W 74–55	28–6	Quicken Loans Arena (12,942); Cleveland, Ohio
NCAA tournament
Mar 20, 2008*	(9 MW)	vs. (8 MW) UNLV; First Round	L 58–71	28–7	Qwest Center Omaha (17,162); Omaha, Nebraska
*Non-conference game. ^{#}Rankings from AP Poll. (#) Tournament seedings in parentheses. MW=Midwest. All times are in Eastern.

== Awards and honors ==
- Al Fisher – MAC Player of the Year
- Jim Christian – MAC Men's Coach of the Year
