= 2008 MAC men's basketball tournament =

- 2008 Tournament Logo
- Classification: Division I
- Season: 2007–08
- Teams: 12
- Site: Quicken Loans Arena; Cleveland, Ohio
- Champions: Kent State (5th title)
- Winning coach: Jim Christian (2nd title)
- MVP: Haminn Quaintance (Kent State)
- Top scorer: Michael Bramos (Miami (OH)) (50 points)
- Television: FSN Ohio, ESPN2
- MAC men's basketball tournaments

The 2008 Mid-American Conference men's basketball tournament was the post-season men's basketball tournament for the Mid-American Conference (MAC) 2007–2008 season. It was won by the #1 seed Kent State Golden Flashes, who defeated their arch-rival and #3 seed Akron Zips 74–55 in front of 12,942 fans. Kent State center Haminn Quaintance led all scorers with 16 points and was named the tournament MVP.

The basketball tournament took place March 12 through March 15 at Quicken Loans Arena in Cleveland. FSN Ohio televised the quarterfinals and semifinals while ESPN2 broadcast the tournament championship nationally.

== Format ==
Each of the 12 men's basketball teams in the MAC received a berth in the conference tournament. Teams were seeded by conference record with the following tie-breakers:

- Head-to-head competition
- Winning percentage vs. ranked conference teams (top to bottom, regardless of division, vs. common opponents regardless of the number of times played)
- Coin flip

The top four seeds received byes into the quarterfinals. The winners of each division were awarded the #1 and #2 seeds. The team with the best record of the two received the #1 seed.

2007–08 Mid-American Conference men's basketball standings
	Conf.				Overall
Team	W		L	PCT	W		L	PCT
East
Kent State †	13	–	3	.813	28	–	7	.800
Akron	11	–	5	.688	24	–	11	.686
Ohio	9	–	7	.563	20	–	13	.606
Miami (OH)	9	–	7	.563	17	–	16	.515
Bowling Green	7	–	9	.438	13	–	16	.448
Buffalo	3	–	13	.188	10	–	20	.333
West
Western Michigan	12	–	4	.750	20	–	12	.625
Central Michigan	8	–	8	.500	14	–	17	.452
Eastern Michigan	8	–	8	.500	14	–	17	.452
Toledo	7	–	8	.467	11	–	19	.367
Ball State	5	–	11	.313	6	–	24	.200
Northern Illinois	3	–	12	.200	6	–	22	.214
† 2008 MAC tournament winner Rankings from AP Poll

=== Tiebreakers ===
- Ohio received No. 4 seed based on 1–1 record vs. No. 1 Kent State; Miami was 0–2 vs. Kent State. Ohio and Miami split the season series 1–1.
- Central Michigan received No. 6 seed based on 1–0 record vs. No. 3 Akron; EMU was 0–1 vs. Akron. CMU and EMU split the season series 1–1 and had the same record vs. No. 1 Kent State (0–1) and No. 2 WMU (1–1).

== Bracket ==
First round Wednesday, March 12
8	Toledo	52
9	Bowling Green	48
5	Miami (OH)	69
12	Buffalo	68
7	Eastern Michigan	59
10	Ball State	55
6	Central Michigan	83
11	Northern Illinois	71

Quarterfinals; Thursday, March 13
1	Kent State	77
8	Toledo	57
4	Ohio	61
5	Miami (OH)	74
2	Western Michigan	70
7	Eastern Michigan	61
3	Akron	81
6	Central Michigan	60

Semifinals; Friday, March 14
1	Kent State	49
5	Miami (OH)	47
2	Western Michigan	62
3	Akron	73

Final; Saturday, March 15
1	Kent State	74
3	Akron	55

== All-tournament team ==
- Al Fisher (Kent State)
- Haminn Quaintance (Kent State)
- Joe Reitz (Western Michigan)
- Mike Scott (Kent State)
- Jeremiah Wood (Akron)

== See also ==
- Mid-American Conference men's basketball tournament
