= 2007–08 Ohio Bobcats men's basketball team =

American college basketball season

2007–08 Ohio Bobcats men's basketball

CBI, Quarterfinals
- Conference: Mid-American Conference
- East Division
- Record: 20–13 (9–7 MAC)
- Head coach: Tim O'Shea (7th season)
- Assistant coaches: John Rhodes; Kevin Kuwik; Bacari Alexander
- Home arena: Convocation Center

2007–08 Mid-American Conference men's basketball standings
	Conf.				Overall
Team	W		L	PCT	W		L	PCT
East
Kent State †	13	–	3	.813	28	–	7	.800
Akron	11	–	5	.688	24	–	11	.686
Ohio	9	–	7	.563	20	–	13	.606
Miami (OH)	9	–	7	.563	17	–	16	.515
Bowling Green	7	–	9	.438	13	–	16	.448
Buffalo	3	–	13	.188	10	–	20	.333
West
Western Michigan	12	–	4	.750	20	–	12	.625
Central Michigan	8	–	8	.500	14	–	17	.452
Eastern Michigan	8	–	8	.500	14	–	17	.452
Toledo	7	–	8	.467	11	–	19	.367
Ball State	5	–	11	.313	6	–	24	.200
Northern Illinois	3	–	12	.200	6	–	22	.214
† 2008 MAC tournament winner Rankings from AP Poll

The 2007–08 Ohio Bobcats men's basketball team represented Ohio University in the college basketball season of 2007–08. The team was coached by Tim O'Shea and played their home games at the Convocation Center. They finished the season 20–13 and 9–7 in MAC play to finish tied for third in the MAC East. After the season O'Shea left Ohio for a position at his alma-mater.

== Roster ==
2007–08 Ohio Bobcats men's basketball team
Players
Coaches

Pos.	#	Name	Height	Weight	Year	Hometown
G	3	Michael Allen	6 ft 0 in (1.83 m)	180 lb (82 kg)	Jr	Detroit, Michigan
G	24	Tommy Freeman	6 ft 5 in (1.96 m)	180 lb (82 kg)	Fr	Muncie, Indiana
G	0	Mike Harris	6 ft 4 in (1.93 m)	195 lb (88 kg)	So	Columbus, Ohio
C	32	Zach Nagtzaam	6 ft 11.5 in (2.12 m)	255 lb (116 kg)	Fr	Ayr, Ontario
F	25	Justin Orr	6 ft 6 in (1.98 m)	205 lb (93 kg)	Jr	Cincinnati, Ohio
F	23	Maurice Pearson	6 ft 9 in (2.06 m)	220 lb (100 kg)	Fr	Silver Spring, Maryland
F	44	Asown Sayles	6 ft 5 in (1.96 m)	210 lb (95 kg)	So	McKeesport, Pennsylvania
F	33	Jerome Tillman	6 ft 6 in (1.98 m)	235 lb (107 kg)	Jr	Beavercreek, Ohio
C	12	Kenneth van Kempen	6 ft 10 in (2.08 m)	265 lb (120 kg)	So	Weert, Netherlands
G	13	Andrew Vroman	6 ft 3 in (1.91 m)	185 lb (84 kg)	Sr	Bowling Green, Ohio
G	4	Bubba Walther	6 ft 5 in (1.96 m)	175 lb (79 kg)	Sr	Cincinnati, Ohio
F	1	DeVaughn Washington	6 ft 7 in (2.01 m)	215 lb (98 kg)	Fr	Virginia Beach, Virginia
G	11	Bert Whittington IV	5 ft 11.5 in (1.82 m)	170 lb (77 kg)	Jr	Hankamer, Texas
F	5	Leon Williams	6 ft 8 in (2.03 m)	245 lb (111 kg)	Sr	Baltimore, Maryland

Head coach

Tim O'Shea

Assistant coach(es)

John Rhodes
Kevin Kuwik
Bacari Alexander

Legend

- (C) Team captain
- (S) Suspended
- (I) Ineligible
- (W) Walk-on
- Injured
- Current redshirt

== Coaching staff ==
Name	Position	College	Graduating year
Tim O'Shea	Head coach	Boston College	1984
John Rhodes	Assistant coach	Ohio University	1988
Kevin Kuwik	Assistant coach	Notre Dame	1996
Bacari Alexander	Assistant coach	Detroit	1999
Doug Dewey	Graduate Assistant	Ohio University	2006

== Preseason ==
The preseason poll was announced by the league office on October 18, 2007. Ohio was picked third in the MAC East.

=== Preseason men's basketball poll ===
(First place votes in parentheses)

==== East Division ====
1. Kent State (10) 147
2. Miami (9) 146
3. Ohio (8) 131
4. Akron (5) 128
5. Buffalo 52
6. Bowling Green 47

==== West Division ====
1. Western Michigan (23) 173
2. Toledo (6) 144
3. Central Michigan (3) 131
4. Eastern Michigan 92
5. Northern Illinois 58
6. Ball State 53

==== Tournament champs ====
Kent State (7), Western Michigan (6), Ohio (5), Miami (5), Akron (4), Toledo (3), Bowling Green (1)

=== Preseason All-MAC ===
Preseason All-MAC teams
Team	Player	Position	Year
Preseason All-MAC East	Jerome Tillman	F	Jr.
Preseason All-MAC East	Leon Williams	F	Sr.

== Schedule and results ==
Date time, TV	Rank^{#}	Opponent^{#}	Result	Record	Site (attendance) city, state
Regular Season
11/9/07*; 7:00 pm		New Mexico State	W 80–72	1–0	Convocation Center (4,701); Athens, OH
11/17/07*; 7:00 pm		Cornell	W 102–89	2–0	Convocation Center (4,570); Athens, OH
11/26/07*; 7:00 pm		at Holy Cross	L 60–62	2–1	Hart Center (2,547); Worcester, MA
11/29/07*; 7:00 pm		at Temple	L 88–90	2–2	Liacouras Center (4,286); Philadelphia, PA
12/2/07*; 2:00 pm		at St. Francis (NY)	W 67–63	3–2	Peter Aquilone Court (307); Brooklyn, NY
12/5/07*; 7:00 pm		St. Bonaventure	W 77–58	4–2	Convocation Center (2,118); Athens, OH
12/8/07*; 2:00 pm		Delaware	W 78–59	5–2	Convocation Center (3,538); Athens, OH
12/12/07*; 8:00 pm		at Maryland	W 61–55	6–2	Comcast Center (12,950); College Park, MD
12/15/07*; 4:05 pm		at No. 3 Kansas	L 51–88	6–3	Sprint Center (18,482); Kansas City, MO
12/19/07*; 5:00 pm		vs. St. John's; Rainbow Classic	W 71–69	7–3	Stan Sheriff Center (6,099); Honolulu, HI
12/21/07*; 7:30 pm		vs. Louisiana-Lafayette; Rainbow Classic	W 74–68	8–3	Stan Sheriff Center (6,075); Honolulu, HI
12/22/07*; 8:00 pm		vs. Saint Mary's; Rainbow Classic	L 63–70	8–4	Stan Sheriff Center (5,908); Honolulu, HI
1/2/08*; 7:00 pm		at Bucknell	W 53–47	9–4	Sojka Pavilion (2,893); Lewisburg, PA
MAC regular season
1/5/09; 4:00 pm		at Bowling Green	L 49–52	9–5 (0–1)	Stroh Center (1,414); Bowling Green, OH
1/12/08; 2:00 pm		Miami (OH)	W 72–63	10–5 (1–1)	Convocation Center (9,026); Athens, OH
1/17/08; 9:05 pm		at Akron	L 54–55	10–6 (1–2)	James A. Rhodes Arena (4557); Akron, OH
1/19/08; 6:00 pm		Kent State	W 71–59	11–6 (2–2)	Convocation Center (7,718); Athens, OH
1/23/08; 7:00 pm		at Buffalo	W 68–59	12–6 (3–2)	Alumni Arena (2,059); Buffalo, NY
1/26/08; 2:00 pm		Ball State	W 61–59	13–6 (4–2)	Convocation Center (10,182); Athens, OH
1/29/08; 7:00 pm		Central Michigan	W 62–47	14–6 (5–2)	Convocation Center (3,705); Athens, OH
2/2/08; 2:00 pm		at Northern Illinois	W 73–55	15–6 (6–2)	Convocation Center (2,324); DeKalb, IL
2/6/08; 7:00 pm		at Eastern Michigan	L 56–63	15–7 (6–3)	Convocation Center (344); Ypsilanti, MI
2/9/08; 2:30 pm		Western Michigan	W 57–54	16–7 (7–3)	Convocation Center (6,884); Athens, OH
2/13/08; 7:00 pm		at Toledo	L 52–54	16–8 (7–4)	Savage Arena (3,576); Toledo, OH
2/16/08; 3:00 pm		at Kent State	L 62–72	16–9 (7–5)	Memorial Athletic and Convocation Center (6,130); Kent, Ohio
2/19/08; 2:00 pm		Bowling Green	W 69–48	17–9 (8–5)	Convocation Center (3,486); Athens, OH
2/23/08*; 1:00 pm		George Mason	W 69–57	18–9 (8–5)	Convocation Center (7,439); Athens, OH
3/1/08; 7:30 pm		at Miami (OH)	L 49–73	18–10 (8–6)	Millett Hall (3,535); Oxford, OH
3/4/08; 7:00 pm		Akron	L 77–80	18–11 (8–7)	Convocation Center (4,139); Athens, OH
3/9/08; 2:00 pm		Buffalo	W 94–80	19–11 (9–7)	Convocation Center (4,139); Athens, OH
MAC tournament
3/12/08; 9:40 pm		vs. Miami (OH); First Round	L 61–74	19–12	Quicken Loans Arena (5,073); Cleveland, OH
CBI
3/18/08*; 7:00 pm		Brown; First Round	W 80–74	20–12	Convocation Center (1,169); Athens, OH
3/24/08*; 7:05 pm		at Bradley; Quarterfinals	L 73–79	20–13	Carver Arena (6,425); Peoria, IL
*Non-conference game. ^{#}Rankings from AP Poll. (#) Tournament seedings in parentheses. All times are in Eastern.

== Statistics ==
=== Team statistics ===
Final 2007–08 statistics

Record	Ohio	OPP
Scoring	2234	2147
Scoring Average	67.70	65.06
Field goals – Att	765–1703	745–1697
3-pt. Field goals – Att	224–647	–
Free throws – Att	480–671	–
Rebounds	1106	1006
Assists	477	
Turnovers	474	
Steals	251	
Blocked Shots	66	

=== Player statistics ===
			Minutes		Scoring		Total FGs			3-point FGs			Free-Throws			Rebounds								
Player	GP	GS	Tot	Avg	Pts	Avg	FG	FGA	Pct	3FG	3FA	Pct	FT	FTA	Pct	Off	Def	Tot	Avg	A	PF	TO	Stl	Blk
Leon Williams	33	33	1009	30.6	542	16.4	180	293	0.614	1	1	1	181	247	0.733	145	180	325	9.8	41	93	80	47	23
Jerome Tillman	32	32	1026	32.1	427	13.3	152	293	0.519	24	64	0.375	99	129	0.767	69	173	242	7.6	36	79	69	34	15
Bubba Walther	31	19	920	29.7	380	12.3	118	293	0.403	82	225	0.364	62	71	0.873	9	52	61	2	116	47	61	46	2
Bert Whittington	33	13	716	21.7	263	8	91	262	0.347	49	149	0.329	32	50	0.64	12	51	63	1.9	45	50	51	34	1
Justin Orr	33	27	765	23.2	224	6.8	81	192	0.422	28	76	0.368	34	53	0.642	32	54	86	2.6	45	42	52	16	9
Michael Allen	32	29	953	29.8	153	4.8	57	127	0.449	13	36	0.361	26	44	0.591	14	56	70	2.2	142	81	84	36	3
Kenneth van Kempen	33	1	379	11.5	77	2.3	31	77	0.403	1	2	0.5	14	21	0.667	21	41	62	1.9	10	73	25	7	5
Allen Hester	27	7	341	12.6	71	2.6	25	87	0.287	12	56	0.214	9	16	0.563	6	24	30	1.1	16	25	17	17	1
Tommy Freeman	30	4	248	8.3	60	2	18	43	0.419	13	35	0.371	11	15	0.733	4	12	16	0.5	17	23	13	5	0
DeVaughn Washington	32	0	208	6.5	29	0.9	10	27	0.37	0	1	0	9	20	0.45	5	30	35	1.1	4	49	16	8	7
Asown Sayles	8	0	29	3.6	6	0.8	2	8	0.25	1	2	0.5	1	3	0.333	5	4	9	1.1	4	4	1	1	0
Andrew Vroman	6	0	6	1	2	0.3	0	1	0	0	0	0	2	2	1	0	0	1	0.2	1	0	1	0	0
Total	33	-	6600	-	2234	67.7	765	1703	0.449	224	647	0.346	480	671	0.715	352	754	1106	33.5	477	566	474	251	66
Opponents	33	-	-	-	2147	65.1	745	1697	0.439			-			-			1006	30.5					

Legend
GP	Games played	GS	Games started	Avg	Average per game
FG	Field-goals made	FGA	Field-goal attempts	Off	Offensive rebounds
Def	Defensive rebounds	A	Assists	TO	Turnovers
Blk	Blocks	Stl	Steals	High	Team high

== Awards and honors ==
=== All-MAC Awards ===
Postseason All-MAC teams
Team	Player	Position	Year
All-MAC First team	Leon Williams	F	Sr.
All-MAC Honorable Mention	Jerome Tillman	F	Jr.
