= 2005–06 Ohio Bobcats men's basketball team =

American college basketball season

2005–06 Ohio Bobcats men's basketball
- Conference: Mid-American Conference
- East Division
- Record: 19–11 (10–8 MAC)
- Head coach: Tim O'Shea (5th season)
- Assistant coaches: John Rhodes; Adam Demong; Brian Townsend; Kevin Kuwik
- Home arena: Convocation Center

2005–06 Mid-American Conference men's basketball standings
	Conf.				Overall
Team	W		L	PCT	W		L	PCT
East
Kent State †	15	–	3	.833	24	–	8	.750
Akron	14	–	4	.778	23	–	9	.719
Miami (OH)	14	–	4	.778	18	–	12	.600
Ohio	10	–	8	.556	19	–	11	.633
Buffalo	8	–	10	.444	19	–	13	.594
Bowling Green	5	–	13	.278	9	–	21	.300
West
Northern Illinois	12	–	6	.667	17	–	11	.607
Toledo	10	–	8	.556	20	–	10	.667
Western Michigan	10	–	8	.556	14	–	17	.452
Ball State	6	–	12	.333	10	–	18	.357
Eastern Michigan	3	–	15	.167	7	–	21	.250
Central Michigan	1	–	17	.056	4	–	24	.143
† 2006 MAC tournament winner Rankings from AP Poll

The 2005–06 Ohio Bobcats men's basketball team represented Ohio University in the college basketball season of 2005–06. The team was coached by Tim O'Shea and played their home games at the Convocation Center. They finished the season 19–11 and 10–9 in MAC play to finish fourth in the MAC East.

== Roster ==
2005–06 Ohio Bobcats men's basketball team
Players
Coaches

Pos.	#	Name	Height	Weight	Year	Hometown
F	32	Matt Annen	6 ft 6 in (1.98 m)	225 lb (102 kg)	Jr	Elk River, Minnesota
G	11	Antonio Chatman	6 ft 1 in (1.85 m)	170 lb (77 kg)	So	Charlestown, Massachusetts
G	10	Whitney Davis	6 ft 3 in (1.91 m)	188 lb (85 kg)	Jr	Ann Arbor, Michigan
G	3	Jeremy Fears	6 ft 3 in (1.91 m)	185 lb (84 kg)	So	Joliet, Illinois
G	00	Mychal Green	6 ft 4 in (1.93 m)	195 lb (88 kg)	Sr	Columbus, Ohio
F	23	Jeff Halbert	6 ft 5 in (1.96 m)	205 lb (93 kg)	Sr	White Bear Lake, Minnesota
F	2	Johnnie Jackson	6 ft 6 in (1.98 m)	210 lb (95 kg)	Jr	Memphis, Tennessee
G	14	Stephen King	6 ft 3 in (1.91 m)	191 lb (87 kg)	Jr	Richfield, Minnesota
F	44	Cliff McGowen	6 ft 9 in (2.06 m)	226 lb (103 kg)	Sr	Westerville, Ohio
F/C	20	Ken Ottrix	6 ft 9 in (2.06 m)	215 lb (98 kg)	Jr	Hilliard, Ohio
F	33	Jerome Tillman	6 ft 6 in (1.98 m)	230 lb (104 kg)	Fr	Beavercreek, Ohio
F	1	Sonny Troutman	6 ft 5 in (1.96 m)	210 lb (95 kg)	Jr	Indianapolis, Indiana
F	5	Leon Williams	6 ft 8 in (2.03 m)	245 lb (111 kg)	So	Baltimore, Maryland

Head coach

Tim O'Shea

Assistant coach(es)

John Rhodes
Kevin Kuwik
Brian Townsend
Adam Demong

Legend

- (C) Team captain
- (S) Suspended
- (I) Ineligible
- (W) Walk-on
- Injured
- Current redshirt

== Coaching staff ==
Name	Position	College	Graduating year
Tim O'Shea	Head coach	Boston College	1984
John Rhodes	Associate Head Coach	Ohio University	1988
Kevin Kuwik	Assistant coach	Notre Dame	1996
Brian Townsend	Assistant coach	Michigan	1991
Adam DeMong	Assistant coach	Boston College	2003

== Preseason ==
The preseason poll was announced by the league office on October 26, 2005. Ohio was picked first in the MAC East.

=== Preseason men's basketball poll ===
(First place votes in parentheses)

==== East Division ====
1. Ohio (16) 153
2. Akron (6) 120
3. Miami (4) 85
4. Kent State 85
5. Buffalo 79
6. Bowling Green 45

==== West Division ====
1. Toledo (15) 135
2. Ball State (5) 127
3. Western Michigan (5) 114
4. Northern Illinois (1) 97
5. Eastern Michigan 54
6. Central Michigan 40

==== Tournament champs ====
Ohio (14), Akron (5), Ball State (4), Miami (2), Toledo (1)

=== Preseason All-MAC ===
Preseason All-MAC teams
Team	Player	Position	Year
Preseason All-MAC East	Leon Williams	F	So.

== Schedule and results ==
Date time, TV	Rank^{#}	Opponent^{#}	Result	Record	Site (attendance) city, state
Regular Season
11/26/05*; 3:00 pm		St. Francis	W 77–61	1–0	Convocation Center (2,164); Athens, OH
12/3/05*; 4:00 pm		American	W 81–50	2–0	Convocation Center (2,137); Athens, OH
12/6/05*; 7:30 pm		at Marist	W 69–63	3–0	McCann Arena (2,463); Poughkeepsie, NY
12/10/05*; 6:00 pm		Rhode Island	W 71–63	4–0	Convocation Center (4,578); Athens, OH
12/14/05*; 8:00 pm		at Cincinnati	L 58–86	4–1	Fifth Third Arena (9,133); Cincinnati, OH
12/17/05*; 3:00 pm		Shippensburg	W 73–57	5–1	Convocation Center (3,130); Athens, OH
12/22/05*; 7:00 pm		Detroit	W 56–55	6–1	Convocation Center (3,614); Athens, OH
12/30/05*; 8:00 pm		vs. No. 19 Kentucky	L 63–71	6–2	US Bank Arena (16,043); Cincinnati, OH
MAC regular season
1/4/06; 7:00 pm		Western Michigan	W 87–55	7–2 (1–0)	Convocation Center (4,405); Athens, OH
1/8/06; 2:00 pm		Ball State	W 71–60	8–2 (2–0)	Convocation Center (4,196); Athens, OH
1/11/06; 7:00 pm		at Eastern Michigan	W 75–63	9–2 (3–0)	Convocation Center (1,330); Ypsilanti, MI
1/14/06; 2:00 pm		Central Michigan	W 76–44	10–2 (4–0)	Convocation Center (10,094); Athens, OH
1/17/06; 8:05 pm		at Northern Illinois	L 59–64	10–3 (4–1)	Convocation Center (1,712); DeKalb, IL
1/21/06; 4:30 pm		at Toledo	W 71–68	11–3 (5–1)	Savage Arena (7,334); Toledo, OH
1/24/06; 7:00 pm		Akron	W 66–63	12–3 (6–1)	Convocation Center (5,981); Athens, OH
1/26/06; 8:00 pm		at Buffalo	L 51–70	12–4 (6–2)	Alumni Arena (5,884); Buffalo, NY
12/29/06; 12:00 pm		Miami (OH)	L 59–73	12–5 (6–3)	Convocation Center (7,238); Athens, OH
2/1/06; 7:00 pm		Kent State	L 60–73	12–6 (6–4)	Convocation Center (4,283); Athens, OH
2/4/06; 2:00 pm		at Bowling Green	W 93–90 ^{2OT}	13–6 (7–4)	Stroh Center (2,054); Bowling Green, OH
2/9/06; 7:00 pm		Northern Illinois	W 78–67	14–6 (8–4)	Convocation Center (4,126); Athens, OH
2/12/06; 7:00 pm		at Western Michigan	L 62–65	14–7 (8–5)	University Arena (3,386); Kalamazoo, MI
2/15/06; 7:00 pm		at Miami (OH)	L 54–65	14–8 (8–6)	Millett Hall (4,007); Oxford, OH
2/18/06*; 8:00 pm		Samford	W 64–52	15–8 (8–6)	Convocation Center (5,112); Athens, OH
2/22/06; 7:00 pm		Buffalo	W 85–72	16–8 (9–6)	Convocation Center (4,006); Athens, OH
2/25/06; 4:00 pm		at Akron	L 61–76	16–9 (9–7)	James A. Rhodes Arena (5,202); Akron, Ohio
2/28/06; 8:00 pm		at Kent State	L 58–78	16–10 (9–8)	Memorial Athletic and Convocation Center (5,207); Kent, OH
3/4/06; 8:00 pm		Bowling Green	W 85–48	17–10 (10–8)	Convocation Center (6,384); Athens, OH
MAC tournament
3/6/06; 7:00 pm		Central Michigan; First Round	W 82–53	18–10	Convocation Center (4,198); Athens, OH
3/9/06; 9:00 pm		vs. Miami (OH); Quarterfinals	W 73–58	19–10	Quicken Loans Arena (6,865); Cleveland, OH
3/10/06; 7:00 pm		vs. Kent State; Semifinals	L 59–72	19–11	Quicken Loans Arena (10,917); Cleveland, OH
*Non-conference game. ^{#}Rankings from AP Poll. (#) Tournament seedings in parentheses. All times are in Eastern.

== Statistics ==
=== Team statistics ===
Final 2005–06 statistics

Record	Ohio	OPP
Scoring	2077	1935
Scoring Average	69.23	64.50
Field goals – Att	719–1570	712–1610
3-pt. Field goals – Att	218–609	–
Free throws – Att	421–606	–
Rebounds	986	957
Assists	427	
Turnovers	424	
Steals	255	
Blocked Shots	70	

=== Player statistics ===
			Minutes		Scoring		Total FGs			3-point FGs			Free-Throws			Rebounds								
Player	GP	GS	Tot	Avg	Pts	Avg	FG	FGA	Pct	3FG	3FA	Pct	FT	FTA	Pct	Off	Def	Tot	Avg	A	PF	TO	Stl	Blk
Mychal Green	30	30	965	32.2	382	12.7	126	292	0.432	70	167	0.419	60	79	0.759	30	99	129	4.3	57	64	63	34	14
Leon Williams	30	30	786	26.2	331	11	126	213	0.592	0	0	0	79	123	0.642	72	136	208	6.9	20	108	59	21	14
Sonny Troutman	30	30	826	27.5	263	8.8	91	219	0.416	26	92	0.283	55	77	0.714	26	58	84	2.8	83	70	69	58	3
Whitney Davis	30	0	717	23.9	247	8.2	81	177	0.458	29	80	0.363	56	87	0.644	33	58	91	3	27	47	40	32	4
Jeff Halbert	28	25	584	20.9	183	6.5	61	135	0.452	47	108	0.435	14	19	0.737	19	61	80	2.9	39	37	20	16	3
Jeremy Fears	19	16	509	26.8	182	9.6	67	159	0.421	16	54	0.296	32	47	0.681	21	27	48	2.5	79	31	62	37	4
Jerome Tillman	26	5	400	15.4	175	6.7	65	124	0.524	1	16	0.063	44	61	0.721	37	62	99	3.8	7	42	20	13	15
Antonio Chatman	30	14	694	23.1	153	5.1	45	112	0.402	17	48	0.354	46	60	0.767	7	33	40	1.3	89	40	55	22	1
Johnnie Jackson	30	0	398	13.3	120	4	41	102	0.402	8	35	0.229	30	40	0.75	27	47	74	2.5	18	42	27	17	7
Ken Ottrix	14	0	50	3.6	22	1.6	10	20	0.5	0	0	0	2	2	1	7	9	16	1.1	1	12	3	1	4
Stephen King	9	0	30	3.3	14	1.6	5	7	0.714	3	5	0.6	1	1	1	0	0	3	0.3	2	1	1	0	0
Matt Annen	14	0	61	4.4	5	0.4	1	5	0.2	1	4	0.25	2	7	0.286	3	9	12	0.9	0	4	1	2	0
Seth Bauman	5	0	15	3	0	0	0	0	0	0	0	0	0	1	0	1	6	7	1.4	5	2	0	2	1
Cliff McGowen	5	0	15	3	0	0	0	5	0	0	0	0	0	2	0	3	1	4	0.8	0	1	0	0	0
Total	30	-	6050	-	2077	69.2	719	1570	0.458	218	609	0.358	421	606	0.695	330	656	986	32.9	427	502	424	255	70
Opponents	30	-	6050	-	1935	64.5	712	1610	0.442			-			-			957	31.9					

Legend
GP	Games played	GS	Games started	Avg	Average per game
FG	Field-goals made	FGA	Field-goal attempts	Off	Offensive rebounds
Def	Defensive rebounds	A	Assists	TO	Turnovers
Blk	Blocks	Stl	Steals	High	Team high
