= 2007–08 Ball State Cardinals men's basketball team =

American college basketball season

2007–08 Ball State Cardinals men's basketball
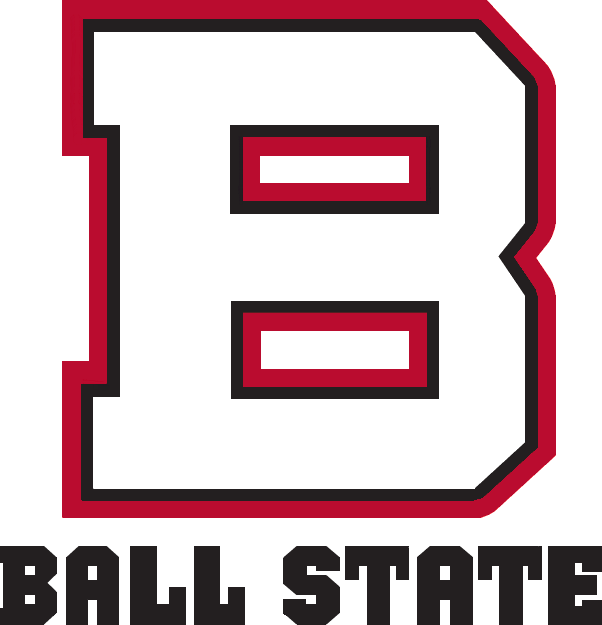
- Conference: Mid-American Conference
- West
- Record: 6–24 (5–11 MAC)
- Head coach: Billy Taylor
- Assistant coaches: Jim Molinari; Joseph Price; Bob Simmons
- Home arena: John E. Worthen Arena

2007–08 Mid-American Conference men's basketball standings
	Conf.				Overall
Team	W		L	PCT	W		L	PCT
East
Kent State †	13	–	3	.813	28	–	7	.800
Akron	11	–	5	.688	24	–	11	.686
Ohio	9	–	7	.563	20	–	13	.606
Miami (OH)	9	–	7	.563	17	–	16	.515
Bowling Green	7	–	9	.438	13	–	16	.448
Buffalo	3	–	13	.188	10	–	20	.333
West
Western Michigan	12	–	4	.750	20	–	12	.625
Central Michigan	8	–	8	.500	14	–	17	.452
Eastern Michigan	8	–	8	.500	14	–	17	.452
Toledo	7	–	8	.467	11	–	19	.367
Ball State	5	–	11	.313	6	–	24	.200
Northern Illinois	3	–	12	.200	6	–	22	.214
† 2008 MAC tournament winner Rankings from AP Poll

The 2007–08 Ball State Cardinals men's basketball team was an NCAA Division I college basketball team competing in the Mid-American Conference.

== Coaching staff ==
- Billy Taylor – Head coach
- Jim Molinari – Assistant coach
- Joseph Price – Assistant coach
- Bob Simmons – Assistant coach
- Jay Newberry – Director of Basketball Operations

== Preseason ==
Billy Taylor replaced Ronny Thompson as head coach of the team. Only Peyton Stovall, Brandon Lampley, Anthony Newell and Rashaun McLemore (who redshirted) would return from last year's team.

== Roster ==
Note: Flags indicate national team eligibility at FIBA sanctioned events. Players may hold other non-FIBA nationality not displayed.

No.		Position	Player
0	(United States)	G	Othello Banaci
1	(United States)	F	Malik Perry
2	(United States)	G	Joey Clawson
3	(United States)	G	Melvin Goins
4	(United States)	G	Brandon Lampley
5	(United States)	G	Deontay Twyman

No.		Position	Player
10	(United States)	G	KeAundre Peak
11	(United States)	G	Laron Frazier
12	(United States)	G	Peyton Stovall
24	(United States)	G	Rob Giles
30	(United States)	F	Dexter Hinkley
32	(United States)	F	Anthony Newell
34	(United States)	G	Rashaun McLemore

Walk-on players are italicized.

== Schedule ==
Date time, TV	Opponent	Result	Record	Site city, state
11/09/2007*; 7:00 pm	Butler	L 45-61	0–1	John E. Worthen Arena; Muncie, IN
11/14/2007*; 7:00 pm	Milwaukee	L 74-81 ^{OT}	0–2	John E. Worthen Arena; Muncie, IN
11/21/2007*; 7:00 pm	No. 5 Georgetown	L 48-57	0–3	John E. Worthen Arena (4,381); Muncie, IN
11/24/2007*; 2:00 pm	Evansville	L 50-51	0–4	John E. Worthen Arena; Muncie, IN
11/27/2007*; 7:00 pm	at Saint Joseph's	L 63-74	0–5	Alumni Memorial Fieldhouse; Philadelphia, PA
12/01/2007*; 7:30 pm	at Valparaiso	L 58-71	0–6	Athletics-Recreation Center; Valparaiso, IN
12/05/2007*; 7:00 pm	at Purdue	L 57-70	0–7	Mackey Arena; West Lafayette, IN
12/08/2007*; 7:00 pm, Ball State Sports Network	at Indiana State	L 48-59	0–8	Hulman Center; Terre Haute, IN
12/16/2007*; 2:00 pm	at Arkansas State	L 47-57	0–9	Convocation Center; Jonesboro, AR
12/19/2007*; 7:00 pm	UC Santa Barbara	L 52-79	0–10	John E. Worthen Arena; Muncie, IN
12/22/2007*; 2:00 pm, Ball State Sports Network	Illinois State	L 49-65	0–11	John E. Worthen Arena; Muncie, IN
12/31/2007*; 2:00 pm	IPFW	W 69-62	1–11	John E. Worthen Arena; Muncie, IN
01/06/2008; 2:00 pm, Ball State Sports Network	at Toledo	L 54–58	1–12 (0–1)	Savage Hall; Toledo, OH
01/13/2008; 2:00 pm, Comcast Local	Central Michigan	W 82–71	2–12 (1–1)	John E. Worthen Arena; Muncie, IN
01/16/2008; 7:00 pm, Ball State Sports Network	Western Michigan	L 45-71	2–13 (1–2)	University Arena; Kalamazoo, MI
01/19/2008; 2:00 pm, Comcast Local	Eastern Michigan	W 64–60	3–13 (2–2)	John E. Worthen Arena; Muncie, IN
01/22/2008; 7:00 pm, Ball State Sports Network	at Northern Illinois	L 58-60	3–14 (2–3)	Convocation Center; DeKalb, IL
01/26/2008; 2:00 pm, ESPN Full Court	at Ohio	L 59-61	3–15 (2–4)	Convocation Center; Athens, OH
01/30/2008; 7:00 pm	Bowling Green	L 53-63	3–16 (2–5)	John E. Worthen Arena; Muncie, IN
02/02/2008; 2:00 pm, Ball State Sports Network	Miami (OH)	L 54-66	3–17 (2–6)	John E. Worthen Arena; Muncie, IN
02/06/2008; 7:00 pm	at Kent State	L 61-64 ^{OT}	3–18 (2–7)	Memorial Athletic and Convocation Center; Kent, OH
02/09/2008; 7:00 pm, Ball State Sports Network	Akron	L 61-70	3–19 (2–8)	John E. Worthen Arena; Muncie, IN
02/13/2008; 7:00 pm	at Buffalo	W 76-67	4–19 (3–8)	Alumni Arena; Buffalo, NY
02/17/2008; 2:00 pm, Ball State Sports Network	Toledo	W 59-52	5–19 (4–8)	John E. Worthen Arena; Muncie, IN
02/20/2008; 7:00 pm, Comcast Local	at Central Michigan	L 58-63	5–20 (4–9)	Daniel P. Rose Center; Mount Pleasant, MI
02/23/2008*; 7:00 pm	at Eastern Kentucky; ESPN Bracket Busters	L 48-51	5–21	Alumni Coliseum; Richmond, KY
03/01/2008; 2:00 pm, Ball State Sports Network	at Eastern Michigan	L 64-75	5–22 (4–10)	Convocation Center; Ypsilanti, MI
03/04/2008; 7:00 pm	Northern Illinois	W 69–63	6–22 (5–10)	John E. Worthen Arena; Muncie, IN
03/09/2008; 2:00 pm, Ball State Sports Network	at Western Michigan	L 53–57	6–23 (5–11)	University Arena; Kalamazoo, MI
03/12/2008	vs. Eastern Michigan; MAC tournament	L 55–59	6–24	Quicken Loans Arena; Cleveland, OH
*Non-conference game. (#) Tournament seedings in parentheses. All times are in Eastern Time.

== Awards ==
=== Mid-American Conference Player of the Week ===
- Peyton Stovall, January 7
