= 2005–06 Eastern Michigan Eagles men's basketball team =

American college basketball season

2005–06 Eastern Michigan Eagles men's basketball
- Conference: Mid-American Conference
- West Division
- Record: 7–21 (3–15 MAC)
- Head coach: Charles E. Ramsey (1st season)
- Assistant coaches: Derrick McDowell; Dusty May; Carl Thomas
- Home arena: Convocation Center

2005–06 Mid-American Conference men's basketball standings
	Conf.				Overall
Team	W		L	PCT	W		L	PCT
East
Kent State †	15	–	3	.833	24	–	8	.750
Akron	14	–	4	.778	23	–	9	.719
Miami (OH)	14	–	4	.778	18	–	12	.600
Ohio	10	–	8	.556	19	–	11	.633
Buffalo	8	–	10	.444	19	–	13	.594
Bowling Green	5	–	13	.278	9	–	21	.300
West
Northern Illinois	12	–	6	.667	17	–	11	.607
Toledo	10	–	8	.556	20	–	10	.667
Western Michigan	10	–	8	.556	14	–	17	.452
Ball State	6	–	12	.333	10	–	18	.357
Eastern Michigan	3	–	15	.167	7	–	21	.250
Central Michigan	1	–	17	.056	4	–	24	.143
† 2006 MAC tournament winner Rankings from AP Poll

The 2005–06 Eastern Michigan Eagles men's basketball team represented Eastern Michigan University during the 2005–06 NCAA Division I men's basketball season. The Eagles, led by 1st year head coach Charles E. Ramsey, played their home games at the Eastern Michigan University Convocation Center and were members of the West Division of the Mid-American Conference. They finished the season 7–21, 3–15 in MAC play. They were knocked out in the 1st round of the MAC Tournament by Western Michigan.

== Roster ==
The team captains were John Bowler, Danny McElhinny.

Number	Name	Position	Height	Weight	Year	Hometown	HS/Previous
2	B.J. Ford	Guard	6–1	170	Freshman	Caledonia, Michigan	East Kentwood
3	Carlos Medlock	Guard	6–0	170	Freshman	Detroit, Michigan	Murray Wright
4	James Matthews	Center	6–8	240	Junior	Detroit, Michigan	Marquette
5	Nick Freer	Guard/Forward	6–6	195	Sophomore	Stevensville, Michigan	Lakeshore
12	Desmond Young	Guard	6–1	180	Freshman	Grand Blanc, Michigan	Grand Blanc
13	Danny McElhinny	Guard	6–0	175	Senior	Hermitage, Pennsylvania	Kennedy Catholic
21	Craig Cashen	Center/Forward	6–8	210	Junior	Cincinnati, Ohio	St. Xavier
23	Gino Smith	Forward	6–7	217	Freshman	Cincinnati, Ohio	Harmony Community School
31	Zane Gay	Guard	6–4	195	Freshman	Olivet, Michigan	Olivet
33	Derek VanSolkema	Guard	6–1	175	Redshirt Sophomore	Grand Rapids, Michigan	South Christian
34	Kyle Dodd	Center	6–11	210	Freshman	Rockwood, Ontario	John F. Ross Collegiate and Vocational Institute
42	John Bowler	Forward	6–9	260	Senior	Chicago, Illinois	Notre Dame
44	Chris Knaub	Center	6–10	225	Junior	South Bend, Indiana	Jacksonville (TX) J.C

== Schedule ==
Date time, TV	Rank^{#}	Opponent^{#}	Result	Record	High points	High rebounds	High assists	Site (attendance) city, state
November 18, 2005*; 8:30 pm		California	W 67–65	1–0	19 – Bowler	12 – Bowler	3 – McElhinny, Medlock, Smith	Convocation Center (3165); Ypsilanti, Michigan
November 26, 2005*; 1:00 pm		at North Dakota State	L 65–87	1–1	23 – Bowler	8 – Bowler, Freer	2 – Freer, Medlock, VanSolkema	Bison Sports Arena (2255); Fargo, North Dakota
November 29, 2005*; 7:00 pm		Detroit	L 60–64	1–2	19 – Bowler	9 – Bowler	4 – Medlock	Convocation Center (1663); Ypsilanti, Michigan
December 03, 2005*; 8:00 pm, ESPN+		at No. 17 Indiana	L 63–79	1–3	28 – Bowler	9 – Bowler	4 – Bowler, Medlock	Assembly Hall (17169); Bloomington, Indiana
December 07, 2005*; 8:30 pm		Youngstown State	W 77–71	2–3	21 – Bowler, Medlock	9 – Bowler	3 – Bowler, Cashen, Freer	Convocation Center (1300); Ypsilanti, Michigan
December 14, 2005*; 7:00 pm		at Green Bay	L 69–73	2–4	19 – Bowler	13 – Bowler	7 – Bowler	Resch Center (2037); Green Bay, Wisconsin
December 22, 2005*; 6:00 pm		Tulsa	W 67–62	3–4	15 – Cashen, Medlock	9 – Smith	4 – Medlock	Convocation Center (1383); Ypsilanti, Michigan
December 30, 2005*; 1:00 pm		at Northern Colorado	L 70–76	3–5	21 – Bowler	10 – Bowler	3 – McElhinny	Bank of Colorado Arena (412); Greeley, Colorado
January 04, 2006; 7:00 pm		at Buffalo	L 53–66	3–6 (0–1)	17 – McElhinny	6 – Bowler	5 – Medlock	Alumni Arena (3679); Amherst, New York
January 07, 2006; 4:00 pm		at Miami	L 59–64 ^{OT}	3–7 (0–2)	31 – Bowler	10 – Bowler	4 – Bowler	Millett Hall (3473); Oxford, Ohio
January 11, 2006; 7:00 pm		Ohio	L 63–75	3–8 (0–3)	18 – Smith	11 – Bowler	6 – Medlock	Convocation Center (1330); Ypsilanti, Michigan
January 14, 2006; 7:30 pm		Kent State	L 64–74	3–9 (0–4)	23 – Bowler	14 – Bowler	3 – Bowler, Medlock, Smith	Convocation Center (1627); Ypsilanti, Michigan
January 18, 2006; 7:00 pm		at Bowling Green	L 72–79	3–10 (0–5)	18 – Bowler	7 – Bowler	5 – Medlock	Convocation Center (1275); Ypsilanti, Michigan
January 21, 2006*; 7:00 pm, Ohio News Network		at Akron	L 61–79	3–11 (0–6)	16 – Bowler	9 – Bowler	5 – Bowler	James A. Rhodes Arena (4461); Akron, Ohio
January 24, 2006; 7:00 pm, Comcast Local		Western Michigan	L 62–68	3–12 (0–7)	15 – Bowler	12 – Bowler	3 – Bowler, Cashen	Convocation Center (1169); Ypsilanti, Michigan
January 26, 2006; 7:00 pm		at Toledo	L 58–88	3–13 (0–8)	14 – Medlock	11 – Bowler	3 – Bowler, McElhinny	Savage Arena (1121); Toledo, Ohio
January 29, 2006; 2:00 pm		Northern Illinois	L 55–67	3–14 (0–9)	17 – Bowler	7 – Bowler	3 – Medlock, Smith	Convocation Center (1219); Ypsilanti, Michigan
February 01, 2006; 7:00 pm		Central Michigan	W 81–75	4–14 (1–9)	24 – Bowler	11 – Bowler	3 – Cashen, Freer	Convocation Center (1253); Ypsilanti, Michigan
February 04, 2006; 4:00 pm, Comcast Local		at Ball State	W 56–43	5–14 (2–9)	18 – McElhinny	12 – Bowler	3 – Medlock	John E. Worthen Arena (4424); Muncie, Indiana
February 07, 2006; 7:00 pm		at Bowling Green	L 71–73	5–15 (2–10)	22 – Medlock	17 – Bowler	5 – Bowler	Stroh Center (2154); Bowling Green, Ohio
February 11, 2006; 7:30 pm		Akron; Cram the Convo Night	L 72–77	5–16 (2–11)	24 – Medlock	10 – Bowler	8 – Medlock	Convocation Center (1805); Ypsilanti, Michigan
February 15, 2006; 7:00 pm		at Western Michigan	L 64–67	5–17 (2–12)	20 – Medlock	9 – Matthews	7 – McElhinny	University Arena (1682); Kalamazoo, Michigan
February 18, 2006*; 3:05 pm		at Eastern Illinois; ESPN Bracket Buster	W 65–50	6–17 (2–12)	24 – Bowler	15 – Bowler	4 – Bowler	Lantz Arena (1071); Charleston, Illinois
February 22, 2006; 7:00 pm		Toledo	L 59–70	6–18 (2–13)	29 – Bowler	15 – Bowler	2 – Medlock	Convocation Center (1358); Ypsilanti, Michigan
February 26, 2006; 3:05 pm		at Northern Illinois	L 61–94	6–19 (2–14)	32 – Bowler	7 – Bowler	3 – Medlock	Convocation Center (3389); DeKalb, Illinois
March 01, 2006; 7:00 pm		at Central Michigan	L 52–55	7–19 (3–14)	21 – Bowler, McElhinny	14 – Bowler	3 – Ford, Medlock	McGuirk Arena (1679); Mount Pleasant, Michigan
March 04, 2006; 2:00 pm, Ball State Sports Network		Ball State	L 77–89 ^{OT}	7–20 (3–15)	31 – Bowler	15 – Bowler	7 – Medlock	Convocation Center (1367); Ypsilanti, Michigan
March 06, 2006; 7:00 pm		at Western Michigan; MAC Tournament Game	L 55–60	7–21 (3–15)	18 – Bowler	15 – Bowler	2 – Cashen, McElhinny	University Arena (1682); Kalamazoo, Michigan
*Non-conference game. ^{#}Rankings from AP Poll. (#) Tournament seedings in parentheses.

== Awards ==
1st Team All-MAC

- John Bowler

MAC All-Freshman team

- Carlos Medlock

MAC Freshman Of The Year

- Carlos Medlock

E-Club Hall of Fame

- Ben Braun

MAC Individual Records

- John Bowler- Scoring (563/20.1)
- 2006 John Bowler- Rebounding (301/10.8)

== Season Highlights ==
11/01 vs Cal

- Head Coaching Debut of EMU's Charles E. Ramsey.
- EMU inducts former head coach Ben Braun into the EMU Athletics Hall of Fame.

01/14 vs Kent State

- EMU celebrated Kennedy McIntosh Night with the retiring of his #54 jersey
