= 2007–08 Western Michigan Broncos men's basketball team =

American college basketball season

2007–08 Western Michigan Broncos men's basketball

MAC West Division Champions
- Conference: Mid-American Conference
- West
- Record: 20–12 (12–4 MAC)
- Head coach: Steve Hawkins
- Assistant coaches: Clayton Bates; Cornell Mann; Andy Hipsher
- Home arena: University Arena

2007–08 Mid-American Conference men's basketball standings
	Conf.				Overall
Team	W		L	PCT	W		L	PCT
East
Kent State †	13	–	3	.813	28	–	7	.800
Akron	11	–	5	.688	24	–	11	.686
Ohio	9	–	7	.563	20	–	13	.606
Miami (OH)	9	–	7	.563	17	–	16	.515
Bowling Green	7	–	9	.438	13	–	16	.448
Buffalo	3	–	13	.188	10	–	20	.333
West
Western Michigan	12	–	4	.750	20	–	12	.625
Central Michigan	8	–	8	.500	14	–	17	.452
Eastern Michigan	8	–	8	.500	14	–	17	.452
Toledo	7	–	8	.467	11	–	19	.367
Ball State	5	–	11	.313	6	–	24	.200
Northern Illinois	3	–	12	.200	6	–	22	.214
† 2008 MAC tournament winner Rankings from AP Poll

The 2007–08 Western Michigan Broncos men's basketball team is an NCAA Division I college basketball team competing in the Mid-American Conference (MAC). The Broncos, 20–12 overall and 12–4 in the conference, captured the MAC West Division championship by four games and earned the No. 2 seed in the conference tournament. WMU reached the semi-finals of the MAC tournament before falling to No. 3 seed Akron.

During the regular season, Western Michigan defeated No. 25 ranked Davidson College, a team that reached the Elite Eight of the NCAA tournament. WMU finished the non-conference portion of their schedule 7–7, defeating Davidson, Detroit Mercy, Loyola Chicago, North Carolina Central, Pepperdine, Southern Illinois and Wisconsin–Green Bay.

WMU also retained the Michigan MAC Trophy for the third consecutive season.

Sophomore David Kool and senior Joe Reitz earned First Team All-MAC honors. Reitz was also named to the MAC All-Tournament team.

== Preseason ==
The Broncos were picked to win the West Division by members of the MAC News Media Association, receiving 23 of 32 possible first place votes (Toledo received six votes and Central Michigan three). Western Michigan also received six votes to win the MAC Tournament, which was second to Kent State (7 votes).

Joe Reitz was named to the Preseason All-MAC Team.

== Awards ==
- Derek Drews
  - West Division Player of the Week (week 1)
- David Kool
  - All-MAC First Team
  - 3-time West Division Player of the Week (weeks 12, 16, 17)
- Joe Reitz
  - All-MAC First Team
  - 4-time West Division Player of the Week (weeks 2, 7, 13, 14)
  - Academic All-District IV First Team
  - Mid-American Conference Academic Player of the Week (February 7)

== Roster ==
No.	Name	Pos.	Height	Weight	Year	Hometown (Previous school)
4	Derek Drews	F	6'5"	224	Jr.	Elkhart, IN (Elkhart Central)
1	Derek Fracalossi	G/F	6'5"	203	Sr.	Davison, MI (Davison)
34	Shawntes Gary	G	6'2"	207	Jr.	Elkhart, IN (Concord)
13	Justin Hairston *	F	6'5"	215	Fr.	Fort Wayne, IN (Fort Wayne South)
5	Andrew Hershberger	F	6'7"	223	Sr.	Goshen, IN (Goshen)
0	Dan Hess	F/C	6'7"	225	Sr.	Owosso, MI (Corunna)
23	David Kool	G	6'3"	200	So.	Grand Rapids, MI (South Christian)
2	Silver Laku	G	6'2"	180	Sr.	Toronto, ON (Marc Garneau Collegiate Institute)
33	Donald Lawson	C	6'9"	234	So.	Chicago, IL (Leo Catholic)
21	Martelle McLemore	G	6'5"	198	So.	Detroit, MI (Consortium Prep)
22	Michael Redell	G	6'0"	183	Jr.	Rockford, MI (Cleveland State)
42	Joe Reitz	C	6'7"	256	Sr.	Fishers, IN (Hamilton Southeastern)
12	Andre Ricks	G	5'9"	159	Jr.	Detroit, MI (Pershing)
15	Alex Wolf	G	5'11"	198	Fr.-R	Parchment, MI (Parchment)
3	Jon Workman *	F	6'9"	220	So.	LaGrange, IN (Lakeland)

* Will redshirt the 2007–2008 season

== Schedule ==
Date time, TV	Rank^{#}	Opponent^{#}	Result	Record	Site (attendance) city, state
Exhibition
November 1, 2007*; 7:00pm		Tri-State; Exhibition	W 94–54	0–0	University Arena (2,088); Kalamazoo, MI
Regular season
November 10, 2007*; 9:30pm		vs. Pacific; World Vision Invitational	L 76–90	0–1	McArthur Court (8,601); Eugene, OR
November 11, 2007*; 6:30pm		vs. Pepperdine; World Vision Invitational	W 70–65	1–1	McArthur Court (8,406); Eugene, OR
November 12, 2007*; 10:30pm, ESPN Full Court		at No. 13 Oregon; World Vision Invitational	L 88–97	1–2	McArthur Court (8,341); Eugene, OR
November 16, 2007*; 8:00pm, WYIN		at Loyola Chicago	W 63–61	2–2	Alumni Gym (1,100); Chicago, IL
November 19, 2007*; 7:00pm		at Detroit Mercy	W 60–59	3–2	Calihan Hall (2,085); Detroit, MI
November 21, 2007*; 7:00pm		No. 25 Davidson	W 83–76	4–2	University Arena (3,542); Kalamazoo, MI
November 28, 2007*; 8:05pm		at Valparaiso	L 65–77	4–3	Athletics-Recreation Center (3,678); Valparaiso, IN
December 1, 2007*; 10:00pm		at San Diego State	L 61–72	4–4	Cox Arena (7,122); San Diego, CA
December 8, 2007*; 2:00pm		Northwestern	L 63–65	4–5	University Arena (4,112); Kalamazoo, MI
December 15, 2007*; 7:00pm		at Indiana-Purdue Indianapolis	L 63–71	4–6	IUPUI Gymnasium (972); Indianapolis, IN
December 18, 2007*; 7:00pm		Southern Illinois	W 57–41	5–6	University Arena (3,168); Kalamazoo, MI
December 22, 2007*; 2:00pm		at Iona	L 62–67	5–7	Hynes Athletic Center (1,411); New Rochelle, NY
January 2, 2008*; 7:00pm		North Carolina Central	W 70–43	6–7	University Arena (2,832); Kalamazoo, MI
January 5, 2008; 2:00pm		Northern Illinois	W 86–69	7–7 (1–0)	University Arena (3,204); Kalamazoo, MI
January 12, 2008; 4:00pm		at Eastern Michigan; Michigan MAC Trophy	L 71–81	7–8 (1–1)	Convocation Center (1,397); Ypsilanti, MI
January 16, 2008; 7:00pm, Ball State Sports Network		at Ball State	W 71–45	8–8 (2–1)	John E. Worthen Arena (3,201); Muncie, IN
January 19, 2008; 2:00pm		Toledo	W 75–62	9–8 (3–1)	University Arena (4,157); Kalamazoo, MI
January 22, 2008; 7:00pm, ESPNU		Central Michigan; Michigan MAC Trophy	W 72–52	10–8 (4–1)	University Arena (3,859); Kalamazoo, MI
January 27, 2008; 2:00pm		at Kent State	L 58–67	10–9 (4–2)	Memorial Athletic and Convocation Center (3,674); Kent, OH
January 29, 2008; 7:00pm		at Buffalo	W 100–90 ^{2OT}	11–9 (5–2)	Alumni Arena (1,787); Buffalo, NY
February 2, 2008; 4:00pm		Bowling Green	W 64–50	12–9 (6–2)	University Arena (4,116); Kalamazoo, MI
February 6, 2008; 7:00pm, Comcast Local		Akron	W 86–66	13–9 (7–2)	University Arena (2,733); Kalamazoo, MI
February 9, 2008; 2:30pm, Comcast Local, FSN Ohio		at Ohio	L 54–57	13–10 (7–3)	Convocation Center (6,884); Athens, OH
February 12, 2008; 7:00pm		Miami	W 78–75 ^{2OT}	14–10 (8–3)	University Arena (3,172); Kalamazoo, MI
February 20, 2008; 9:00pm, ESPNU		Eastern Michigan; Michigan MAC Trophy	W 70–52	15–10 (9–3)	University Arena (3,014); Kalamazoo, MI
February 23, 2008*; 8:05pm		at Wisconsin–Green Bay; ESPN Bracket Busters	W 74–67	16–10	Resch Center (3,414); Green Bay, WI
February 26, 2008; 8:00pm		at Northern Illinois	W 56–49	17–10 (10–3)	Convocation Center (2,032); DeKalb, IL
March 1, 2008; 7:00pm		at Toledo	W 69–55	18–10 (11–3)	Savage Hall (6,813); Toledo, OH
March 4, 2008; 7:00pm, Comcast TV		at Central Michigan; Michigan MAC Trophy	L 68–72	18–11 (11–4)	Daniel P. Rose Center (1,178); Mount Pleasant, MI
March 9, 2008; 2:00pm, Ball State Sports Network		Ball State	W 57–53	19–11 (12–4)	University Arena (4,546); Kalamazoo, MI
MAC Tournament
March 13, 2008*; 12:00pm, FSN Ohio, FSN Plus		vs. Eastern Michigan; MAC Tournament quarterfinals	W 70–61	20–11	Quicken Loans Arena (TBA); Cleveland, OH
March 14, 2008*; 7:00pm, FSN Ohio, FSN Plus		vs. Akron; MAC Tournament semifinals	L 62–73	20–12	Quicken Loans Arena (TBA); Cleveland, OH
*Non-conference game. ^{#}Rankings from AP Poll. (#) Tournament seedings in parentheses. All times are in Eastern Time.

== Coaching staff ==
- Steve Hawkins – Head coach
- Clayton Bates – Assistant coach
- Cornell Mann – Assistant coach
- Andy Hipsher – Assistant coach
- Phil Sayers – Director of Basketball Operations

== 2008–2009 recruits ==
Western Michigan signed forwards Muhammed Conteh, Justin Hairston and Flenard Whitfield, center Lemarcus Lowe and guards Mike Douglas and Demetrius Ward during this season. Each player will be a freshman for the 2008–09 season. Lowe was rated the #1 Michigan high school center in 2007.
