= 2006 MAC men's basketball tournament =

- Classification: Division I
- Season: 2005–06
- Teams: 12
- Site: Quicken Loans Arena; Cleveland, Ohio
- Champions: Kent State (4th title)
- Winning coach: Jim Christian (2nd title)
- MVP: Kevin Warzynski (Kent State)
- MAC men's basketball tournaments

2005–06 Mid-American Conference men's basketball standings
	Conf.				Overall
Team	W		L	PCT	W		L	PCT
East
Kent State †	15	–	3	.833	24	–	8	.750
Akron	14	–	4	.778	23	–	9	.719
Miami (OH)	14	–	4	.778	18	–	12	.600
Ohio	10	–	8	.556	19	–	11	.633
Buffalo	8	–	10	.444	19	–	13	.594
Bowling Green	5	–	13	.278	9	–	21	.300
West
Northern Illinois	12	–	6	.667	17	–	11	.607
Toledo	10	–	8	.556	20	–	10	.667
Western Michigan	10	–	8	.556	14	–	17	.452
Ball State	6	–	12	.333	10	–	18	.357
Eastern Michigan	3	–	15	.167	7	–	21	.250
Central Michigan	1	–	17	.056	4	–	24	.143
† 2006 MAC tournament winner Rankings from AP Poll

The 2006 MAC men's basketball tournament, a part of the 2005-06 NCAA Division I men's basketball season, took place from March 6–March 11, 2006 at Quicken Loans Arena in Cleveland. The March 6 first-round games were held at the higher seeds home arenas. Its winner received the Mid-American Conference's automatic bid to the 2006 NCAA tournament. It is a single-elimination tournament with four rounds and the four highest seeds received byes in the first round. All MAC teams were invited to participate. Kent State, the MAC regular season winner, received the number one seed in the tournament. Kent State defeated seventh-seeded Toledo in the final. In the NCAA tournament they lost in the first round to Pittsburgh.

== Tournament ==
=== Seeds ===
The top two seeds of the tournament were given to division winners. Since Kent State had a better record than Northern Illinois, they were given the #1 seed, and the Huskies were given the #2 seed. The remainder of the bracket was determined by overall record. For the #3 seed, Akron and Miami were tied with a 14–4 conference record. They had also split their two regular season matches. The next tiebreaker is to determine the teams performance against ranked teams in order. Akron was able to win one game against the Golden Flashes while Miami was unable to win one, so Akron was given the fourth seed and Miami was given the final bye in the tournament. The #5 seed was determined through a three-way tie between Ohio, Toledo, and Western Michigan. Ohio had won its matches against Western Michigan and Toledo so they were given the #5 seed. Since Toledo was able to defeat Kent State in the regular season and Western Michigan was not, they were given the #6 seed. Buffalo was seven games behind Kent State and had earned the eighth seed. Ball State was the #9 seed and the final East Division team, Bowling Green was the #10 seed. The final two teams, Eastern Michigan and Central Michigan were given the eleventh and twelfth seeds, respectively.

=== Bracket ===
First round March 6, 2006
8	Buffalo	80
9	Ball State	72
5	Ohio	82
12	Central Michigan	53
7	Toledo	77
10	Bowling Green	52
6	Western Michigan	60
11	Eastern Michigan	55

Quarterfinals; March 9, 2006
1	Kent State	76
8	Buffalo	67
4	Miami (OH)	58
5	Ohio	73
2	Northern Illinois	77
7	Toledo	78
3	Akron	72
6	Western Michigan	57

Semifinals; March 10, 2006
1	Kent State	72
5	Ohio	59
7	Toledo	77
3	Akron	69

Championship; March 11, 2006
1	Kent State	71
7	Toledo	66

=== First round ===
Team	1st	2nd	Final
Central Michigan	50	32	82
Ohio	32	21	53

Team	1st	2nd	Final
Toledo	34	43	77
Bowling Green	21	31	52

Team	1st	2nd	Final
Western Michigan	33	22	55
Eastern Michigan	25	35	60

Team	1st	2nd	Final
Buffalo	44	36	80
Ball State	28	44	72

=== Quarterfinals ===
Team	1st	2nd	Final
Toledo	39	39	78
Northern Illinois	23	54	77

Team	1st	2nd	Final
Kent State	35	41	76
Buffalo	27	40	67

Team	1st	2nd	Final
Akron	31	41	72
Western Michigan	28	29	57

Team	1st	2nd	Final
Ohio	40	33	73
Miami	32	26	58

=== Semi-finals ===
Team	1st	2nd	Final
Kent State	33	39	72
Ohio	26	33	59

Team	1st	2nd	Final
Toledo	34	43	77
Akron	40	29	69

=== Finals ===
Team	1st	2nd	Final
Kent State	32	39	71
Toledo	21	45	66
