= Louis Orr =

American basketball player and coach (1958–2022)

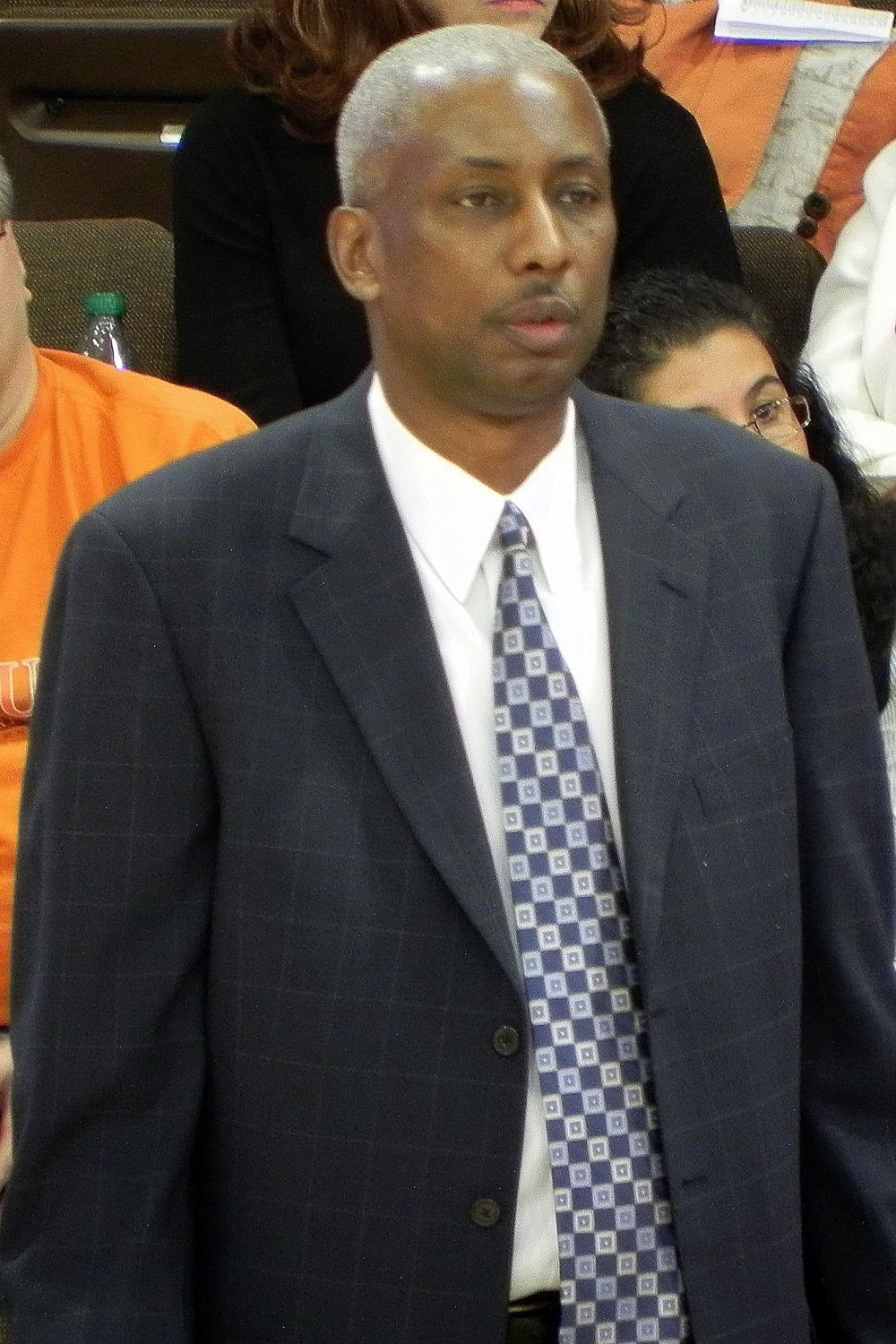
- Orr in 2011

Personal information
- Born: May 7, 1958 Cincinnati, Ohio, U.S.
- Died: December 15, 2022 (aged 64) Cincinnati, Ohio, U.S.
- Listed height: 6 ft 8 in (2.03 m)
- Listed weight: 175 lb (79 kg)

Career information
- High school: Withrow (Cincinnati, Ohio)
- College: Syracuse (1976–1980)
- NBA draft: 1980: 2nd round, 29th overall pick
- Drafted by: Indiana Pacers
- Playing career: 1980–1988
- Position: Power forward / small forward
- Number: 55
- Coaching career: 1991–2022

Career history

Playing
- 1980–1982: Indiana Pacers
- 1982–1988: New York Knicks

Coaching
- 1991–1994: Xavier (assistant)
- 1994–1996: Providence (assistant)
- 1996–2000: Syracuse (assistant)
- 2000–2001: Siena
- 2001–2006: Seton Hall
- 2007–2014: Bowling Green
- 2017–2022: Georgetown (assistant)

Career highlights
- As player: First-team All-Big East (1980); No. 55 retired by Syracuse Orange (2015); As head coach: MAAC regular season champion (2001); MAC regular season champion (2009); Big East Coach of the Year (2003); MAC Coach of the Year (2009)
- Stats at NBA.com
- Stats at Basketball Reference

Louis McLaughlin Orr (May 7, 1958 – December 15, 2022) was an American basketball player and coach. He played professionally in the National Basketball Association (NBA) and became a college basketball coach. Orr was the head coach at Bowling Green State University from 2007 to 2014 and at Seton Hall from 2001 until 2006. He was formerly an assistant at Xavier University, Providence College and his alma mater Syracuse University, before getting his first head coaching job at Siena College. He was also an assistant coach at Georgetown under his former New York Knicks teammate Patrick Ewing.

== Playing career ==
Orr attended Withrow High School where he was coached by Charles Cadle. Orr was recruited by Jim Boeheim as part of his first recruiting class to play at Syracuse University from 1976 to 1980, and was part of the famed "Louie & Bouie Show" with teammate Roosevelt Bouie. The duo was named so after the student newspaper The Daily Orange ran a caricature of them heading up the basketball court in tuxedos and top hats. During his four years, the Orangemen had a 100–18 record. Orr scored 1,487 points, helping team to four NCAA tournament appearances.

After graduating from Syracuse in 1980, he was the 28th pick in the 1980 NBA draft, selected by the Indiana Pacers. Orr played two seasons with the Pacers, which included a playoff appearance his rookie season, during which Orr averaged 12 points, 5 rebounds, and 2.5 steals a game in a first round loss against the Philadelphia 76ers. After that, he moved on to the New York Knicks, and played for six years, with three overall playoff berths. Orr averaged career highs in points and rebounds for the Knicks, with 12.7 and 4.9, respectively, in the 1984–85 season. On January 20, 1987, Orr scored 8 points, grabbed 6 rebounds, recorded 6 assists, and hit a game-winning three point shot as time expired in a 111–109 win over the Boston Celtics. He scored over 5,500 career points as a pro.

== Coaching career ==
Orr's first assistant coaching job in 1990 in his hometown of Cincinnati, Ohio, with Xavier. Then, in 1994, he began serving under Pete Gillen at Providence and soon he was an assistant under Jim Boeheim at Syracuse. During his tenure there, he rose to become a noted assistant, and helped them to a 92–40 record in that time. Syracuse reached the Sweet 16 of the NCAA tournament twice during Orr's time there.

=== Siena ===
In 2000, Orr received his first head coaching job, accepting the position as head coach at Siena College. In his lone year at Siena, Orr led the Saints to a three-way tie for first place in the Metro Atlantic Athletic Conference and a 20–11 record, the best ever for a first-year Siena coach. Siena broke many attendance records that year as well.

=== Seton Hall ===
Orr became the first former Big East player to become a head coach in the conference after he was hired in 2001 by Seton Hall after Tommy Amaker left to become the head coach at Michigan. In his first year in the Big East Conference, Orr went 12–18, but was noted for playing Duke very close in the Maui Invitational.

By his fifth season at Seton Hall, Orr had led the Pirates to two NCAA Tournaments in three years. In the 2004 NCAA tournament, Seton Hall defeated the 9th seed Arizona in the first round before falling to 1st seed Duke in the second round. During the 2005–06 season, Orr led Seton Hall to a 9–7 record in the Big East and an 18–12 record overall. Seton Hall was seeded 10th in the 2006 NCAA tournament and played the 7th seed Wichita State, falling 86–66. Although Orr had made the NCAA tournament twice and the NIT once in his five seasons at Seton Hall, concerns about lackluster recruiting resulted in his firing after the 2005–06 season with a record of 80–69.

=== Bowling Green ===
After sitting out from coaching for a season, Orr was hired to become the men's basketball coach at Bowling Green State University, replacing former head coach Dan Dakich whose contract was not renewed by Bowling Green after ten seasons. In his first season at Bowling Green, Orr posted a 13–17 overall record and 7–9 record in the MAC, finishing 5th in the East Division. The following season, Orr led Bowling Green to their 10th MAC regular season title after the Falcons posted an 11–5 conference record. Although the top seed in the conference tournament, Bowling Green would fall in the tournament semifinals to eventual champion Akron. As the MAC regular season champion, Bowling Green received an automatic bid to the 2009 National Invitation Tournament. Bowling Green was the 8th seed in bracket 3 and played at the bracket's top seed Creighton. Bowling Green made a strong comeback, but fell short, losing to Creighton 73–71 in their first-round game. Orr was named the MAC Coach of the Year for Bowling Green's performance during the 2008–09 season.

On March 11, 2014, Bowling Green announced that it would not renew Orr's contract. Orr was 101–121 in seven seasons, including a record of 54–60 in Mid-American Conference play.

== Death ==
On December 15, 2022, Orr died of melanoma at his home in Cincinnati at the age of 64.

== Career statistics ==
=== NBA ===
Legend
GP	Games played	GS	Games started	MPG	Minutes per game
FG%	Field goal percentage	3P%	3-point field goal percentage	FT%	Free throw percentage
RPG	Rebounds per game	APG	Assists per game	SPG	Steals per game
BPG	Blocks per game	PPG	Points per game	**Bold**	Career high

==== Regular season ====
Year	Team	GP	GS	MPG	FG%	3P%	FT%	RPG	APG	SPG	BPG	PPG
1980–81	Indiana	**82**		21.8	.491	.000	.807	4.4	1.6	.7	.3	10.5
1981–82	Indiana	80	41	24.4	**.497**	.125	.799	4.1	1.7	.7	.3	11.5
1982–83	New York	**82**	14	20.3	.462	.000	.800	2.8	1.1	.8	.3	8.4
1983–84	New York	78	20	21.0	.458	–	**.820**	2.9	.8	.8	.2	8.9
1984–85	New York	79	31	**31.0**	.486	.100	.784	**4.9**	1.7	**1.3**	.3	**12.7**
1985–86	New York	74	**64**	30.2	.445	.000	.784	4.2	**2.4**	.8	**.4**	11.9
1986–87	New York	65	8	22.2	.427	**.200**	.727	3.6	1.7	.7	.3	7.0
1987–88	New York	29	0	6.2	.320	.000	.500	1.2	.3	.2	.0	1.4
Career		569	178	23.5	.468	.083	.787	3.7	1.5	.8	.3	9.7

==== Playoffs ====
Year	Team	GP	GS	MPG	FG%	3P%	FT%	RPG	APG	SPG	BPG	PPG
1981	Indiana	2		**28.0**	.360	–	.857	**5.0**	**2.0**	**2.5**	.5	**12.0**
1983	New York	6		17.5	.383	–	**1.000**	3.5	.5	.8	**.7**	7.7
1984	New York	**12**		18.1	**.414**	–	.789	4.2	.5	.3	.1	6.1
1988	New York	2	0	1.5	.000	–	.500	1.0	.0	.0	.0	.5
Career		22	0	17.9	.392	–	.842	3.8	.6	.6	.3	6.5

=== Head coaching record ===
Record table
Season	Team	Overall	Conference	Standing	Postseason
**Siena Saints** (Metro Atlantic Athletic Conference) (2000–2001)
2000–01	Siena	20–11	12–6	T–1st	
Siena:		20–11 (.645)	12–6 (.667)		
**Seton Hall Pirates** (Big East Conference) (2001–2006)
2001–02	Seton Hall	12–18	5–11	6th (West)	
2002–03	Seton Hall	17–13	10–6	T–3rd (West)	NIT First Round
2003–04	Seton Hall	21–10	10–6	T–5th	NCAA Division I Second Round
2004–05	Seton Hall	12–16	4–12	T–9th	
2005–06	Seton Hall	18–12	9–7	7th	NCAA Division I First Round
Seton Hall:		80–69 (.537)	38–42 (.475)		
**Bowling Green Falcons** (Mid-American Conference) (2007–2014)
2007–08	Bowling Green	13–17	7–9	5th (East)	
2008–09	Bowling Green	19–14	11–5	T–1st (East)	NIT First Round
2009–10	Bowling Green	14–16	6–10	6th (East)	
2010–11	Bowling Green	14–19	8–8	T–5th (East)	
2011–12	Bowling Green	16–16	9–7	6th (East)	CIT First Round
2012–13	Bowling Green	13–19	7–9	T–4th (East)	
2013–14	Bowling Green	12–20	6–12	6th (East)	
Bowling Green:		101–121 (.455)	54–60 (.474)		
Total:		201–201 (.500)			
National champion Postseason invitational champion Conference regular season champion Conference regular season and conference tournament champion Division regular season champion Division regular season and conference tournament champion Conference tournament champion
