= 2007–08 Bowling Green Falcons men's basketball team =

American college basketball season

2007–08 Bowling Green Falcons men's basketball
- Conference: Mid-American Conference
- East
- Record: 13–17 (7–9 MAC)
- Head coach: Louis Orr
- Assistant coaches: LaMonta Stone; George Jackson; Andy Moore
- Home arena: Anderson Arena

2007–08 Mid-American Conference men's basketball standings
	Conf.				Overall
Team	W		L	PCT	W		L	PCT
East
Kent State †	13	–	3	.813	28	–	7	.800
Akron	11	–	5	.688	24	–	11	.686
Ohio	9	–	7	.563	20	–	13	.606
Miami (OH)	9	–	7	.563	17	–	16	.515
Bowling Green	7	–	9	.438	13	–	16	.448
Buffalo	3	–	13	.188	10	–	20	.333
West
Western Michigan	12	–	4	.750	20	–	12	.625
Central Michigan	8	–	8	.500	14	–	17	.452
Eastern Michigan	8	–	8	.500	14	–	17	.452
Toledo	7	–	8	.467	11	–	19	.367
Ball State	5	–	11	.313	6	–	24	.200
Northern Illinois	3	–	12	.200	6	–	22	.214
† 2008 MAC tournament winner Rankings from AP Poll

The 2007–08 Bowling Green Falcons men's basketball team was an NCAA Division I college basketball team competing in the Mid-American Conference.

== Preseason ==
On April 4, 2007, Bowling Green State University announced Louis Orr as the program's 15th head coach, replacing Dan Dakich who left BG to become an assistant under Kelvin Sampson at Indiana. Louis Orr joined the Falcons after five years at Seton Hall, where he compiled an 80–69 record and led the Pirates to two NCAA tournament appearances. Entering the 2007–08 season, Bowling Green was picked to finish sixth in the MAC East division by the MAC News Media Association.

== Coaching staff ==
- Louis Orr – Head coach
- LaMonta Stone – Assistant coach
- George Jackson – Assistant coach
- Andy Moore – Assistant coach
- Rick Palmer – Director of Basketball Operations

== Roster ==
Note: Flags indicate national team eligibility at FIBA sanctioned events. Players may hold other non-FIBA nationality not displayed.

No.		Position	Player
1	(United States)	G	Brian Moten
2	(United States)	F	Darryl Clements
12	(United States)	G	Ryan Sims
14	(United States)	G	Joe Jakubowski
20	(United States)	F	Nate Miller
23	(United States)	F	Chris Knight

No.		Position	Player
24	(United States)	F	Cameron Madlock
32	(United States)	G	Matt Karaffa
34	(United States)	F	Erik Marschall
45	(United States)	C	Otis Polk
50	(United States)	C	Marc Larson

Starters are indicated in bold

== Schedule ==
Date time, TV	Rank^{#}	Opponent^{#}	Result	Record	Site city, state
Exhibition
11/01/07*; 7:00pm		Wayne State (MI); Exhibition	**W** 59–44	—	Anderson Arena; Bowling Green, OH
Regular season
11/09/07*; 5:00pm		vs. Western Carolina; Peggy Cronin Classic	**L** 60–63	0–1	Fifth Third Arena; Cincinnati, OH
11/10/07*; 4:00pm		vs. Belmont; Peggy Cronin Classic	**W** 78–67	1–1	Fifth Third Arena; Cincinnati, OH
11/11/07*; 8:00pm, WXIX		at Cincinnati; Peggy Cronin Classic	**W** 69–67	2–1	Fifth Third Arena; Cincinnati, OH
11/17/07*; 4:00pm		Morehead State	**W** 86–70	3–1	Anderson Arena; Bowling Green, OH
11/24/07*; 2:00pm, BCSN		Temple	**L** 55–72	3–2	Anderson Arena; Bowling Green, OH
11/27/07*; 7:00pm		at Furman	**W** 67–58	4–2	Timmons Arena; Greenville, SC
12/01/07*; 4:00pm, FSN Detroit		at Oakland	**L** 80–90	4–3	Athletics Center O'rena; Rochester, MI
12/06/07*; 9:05pm		at Northern Colorado	**L** 60–64 ^{OT}	4–4	Butler-Hancock Sports Pavilion; Greeley, CO
12/16/07*; 2:00pm		Illinois State	**L** 58–69	4–5	Anderson Arena; Bowling Green, OH
12/22/07*; 2:00pm, WTWO		at Indiana State	**L** 57–62	4–6	Hulman Center; Terre Haute, IN
12/29/07*; 7:00pm, BCSN		Eastern Illinois	**W** 52–48	5–6	Anderson Arena; Bowling Green, OH
01/02/08*; 7:00pm, BCSN		Duquesne	**L** 78–96	5–7	Anderson Arena; Bowling Green, OH
01/02/08; 4:00pm, BCSN		Ohio	**W** 52–49	6–7 (1–0)	Anderson Arena; Bowling Green, OH
01/12/08; 7:00pm		at Kent State	**L** 49–63	6–8 (1–1)	Memorial Athletic and Convocation Center; Kent, OH
01/17/08; 7:00pm, BCSN		Buffalo	**W** 83–70	7–8 (2–1)	Anderson Arena; Bowling Green, OH
01/20/08; 7:00pm		at Akron	**L** 44–80	7–9 (2–2)	James A. Rhodes Arena; Akron, OH
01/23/08; 7:00pm, BCSN		Miami (OH)	**W** 55–52	8–9 (3–2)	Anderson Arena; Bowling Green, OH
01/27/08; 2:00pm, BCSN		Northern Illinois	**W** 63–59	9–9 (4–2)	Anderson Arena; Bowling Green, OH
01/30/08; 7:00pm		at Ball State	**W** 63–53	10–9 (5–2)	John E. Worthen Arena; Muncie, IN
02/02/08; 4:00pm		at Western Michigan	**L** 50–64	10–10 (5–3)	University Arena; Kalamazoo, MI
02/06/08; 7:00pm, BCSN		Central Michigan	**L** 77–81 ^{OT}	10–11 (5–4)	Anderson Arena; Bowling Green, OH
02/10/08; 4:00pm, ESPNU		Toledo	**W** 69–58	11–11 (6–4)	Anderson Arena; Bowling Green, OH
02/13/08; 7:00pm, Comcast Local		at Eastern Michigan	**L** 68–78	11–12 (6–5)	Convocation Center; Ypsilanti, MI
02/16/08; 2:00pm		Akron	**L** 56–65	11–13 (6–6)	Anderson Arena; Bowling Green, OH
02/19/08; 7:00pm, ESPN Full Court		at Ohio	**L** 48–69	11–14 (6–7)	Convocation Center; Athens, OH
02/23/08*; 4:05pm		at Detroit; ESPN Bracket Busters	**W** 81–65	12–14 (6–7)	Calihan Hall; Detroit, MI
03/01/08; 12:30pm		No. 23 Kent State	**W** 89–83	13–14 (7–7)	Anderson Arena; Bowling Green, OH
03/04/08; 7:00pm		at Buffalo	**L** 50–96	13–15 (7–8)	Alumni Arena; Amherst, NY
03/09/08; 12:00pm, FSN Ohio		at Miami (OH)	**L** 59–75	13–16 (7–9)	Millett Hall; Oxford, OH
MAC tournament
3/13/08*; 5:30pm		vs. Toledo; MAC Tournament first round	**L** 48–52	13–17 (7–9)	Quicken Loans Arena; Cleveland, OH
*Non-conference game. ^{#}Rankings from Coaches' Poll. (#) Tournament seedings in parentheses. All times are in Eastern Time.

== Awards ==
=== Mid-American Conference Player of the Week ===
- Chris Knight, week 1
- Joe Jakubowski, week 17
