= 2005–06 Kent State Golden Flashes men's basketball team =

American college basketball season

2005–06 Kent State Golden Flashes men's basketball

MAC tournament champions MAC East Division Champions

NCAA tournament, first round
- Conference: Mid-American Conference
- East
- Record: 25–9 (15–3 MAC)
- Head coach: Jim Christian (4th season)
- Assistant coach: Rob Senderoff (4th season)
- Home arena: Memorial Athletic and Convocation Center

2005–06 Mid-American Conference men's basketball standings
	Conf.				Overall
Team	W		L	PCT	W		L	PCT
East
Kent State †	15	–	3	.833	24	–	8	.750
Akron	14	–	4	.778	23	–	9	.719
Miami (OH)	14	–	4	.778	18	–	12	.600
Ohio	10	–	8	.556	19	–	11	.633
Buffalo	8	–	10	.444	19	–	13	.594
Bowling Green	5	–	13	.278	9	–	21	.300
West
Northern Illinois	12	–	6	.667	17	–	11	.607
Toledo	10	–	8	.556	20	–	10	.667
Western Michigan	10	–	8	.556	14	–	17	.452
Ball State	6	–	12	.333	10	–	18	.357
Eastern Michigan	3	–	15	.167	7	–	21	.250
Central Michigan	1	–	17	.056	4	–	24	.143
† 2006 MAC tournament winner Rankings from AP Poll

The 2005–06 Kent State Golden Flashes men's basketball team represented Kent State University as a member of the Mid-American Conference during the 2005–06 NCAA Division I men's basketball season. Led by fourth-year head coach Jim Christian, the Flashes reached the NCAA tournament under the third different head coach in a six-year span. After finishing atop the MAC East division in the regular season standings, Kent State won the MAC tournament to receive the conference's automatic bid to the NCAA tournament. Playing as the No. 12 seed in the Oakland region, Kent State lost to No. 5 seed Pittsburgh in the opening round. The team finished the season with a record of 25–9 (15–3 MAC).

== Roster ==
2005–06 Kent State Golden Flashes men's basketball team
Players
Coaches

Pos.	#	Name	Height	Weight	Year	Hometown
C	2	Nate Gerwig	6 ft 9 in (2.06 m)	260 lb (118 kg)	Sr	Pittsburgh, Pennsylvania
F	4	Isaac Knight	6 ft 7 in (2.01 m)	225 lb (102 kg)	Fr	Detroit, Michigan
G	5	Omni Smith	6 ft 3 in (1.91 m)	175 lb (79 kg)	Jr	Chicago, Illinois
G	11	Jordan Mincy	5 ft 10 in (1.78 m)	175 lb (79 kg)	Fr	Memphis, Tennessee
G	13	Jay Youngblood	6 ft 5 in (1.96 m)	200 lb (91 kg)	Sr	Detroit, Michigan
F	21	Mike Scott	6 ft 7 in (2.01 m)	190 lb (86 kg)	So	Indianapolis, Indiana
G	23	DeAndre Haynes	6 ft 2 in (1.88 m)	185 lb (84 kg)	Sr	Detroit, Michigan
G	25	Armon Gates	6 ft 2 in (1.88 m)	185 lb (84 kg)	Jr	Country Club Hills, Illinois
F	34	Julian Sullinger	6 ft 5 in (1.96 m)	230 lb (104 kg)	Fr	Columbus, Ohio
F	42	Kevin Warzynski	6 ft 8 in (2.03 m)	245 lb (111 kg)	Sr	Mount Pleasant, South Carolina

Head coach

- Jim Christian

Assistant coach(es)

- Rob Senderoff

Legend

- (C) Team captain
- (S) Suspended
- (I) Ineligible
- (W) Walk-on
- Injured
- Current redshirt

Roster

== Schedule and results ==
Date time, TV	Rank^{#}	Opponent^{#}	Result	Record	Site (attendance) city, state
Non-conference Regular season
Nov 21, 2005*		Delaware State	L 56–65	0–1	Memorial Athletic and Convocation Center; Kent, Ohio
Nov 22, 2005*		Austin Peay	W 94–67	1–1	Memorial Athletic and Convocation Center; Kent, Ohio
Nov 25, 2005*		vs. Rutgers	L 52–55	1–2	South Padre Island Convention Centre; South Padre Island, Texas
Nov 26, 2005*		vs. Texas-Rio Grande Valley	W 82–70	2–2	South Padre Island Convention Centre; South Padre Island, Texas
Nov 30, 2005*		at Youngstown State	W 77–69	3–2	Beeghly Center; Youngstown, Ohio
Dec 3, 2005*		Cleveland State	W 83–68	4–2	Memorial Athletic and Convocation Center; Kent, Ohio
Dec 8, 2005*		Purdue-Fort Wayne	W 86–61	5–2	Memorial Athletic and Convocation Center; Kent, Ohio
Dec 10, 2005*		at Southern Illinois	L 51–58	5–3	SIU Arena; Carbondale, Illinois
Dec 30, 2005*		at Syracuse	L 66–78	6–5	Carrier Dome; Syracuse, New York
MAC Regular season
Jan 4, 2006		Toledo	W 76–68	7–5 (1–0)	Memorial Athletic and Convocation Center; Kent, Ohio
Mar 4, 2006		at Akron	L 67–75	22–8 (15–3)	James A. Rhodes Arena; Akron, Ohio
MAC Tournament
Mar 9, 2006*		vs. Buffalo; Quarterfinals	W 76–67	23–8	Quicken Loans Arena; Cleveland, Ohio
Mar 10, 2006*		vs. Ohio; Semifinals	W 72–59	24–8	Quicken Loans Arena; Cleveland, Ohio
Mar 11, 2006*		vs. Toledo; Championship game	W 71–66	25–8	Quicken Loans Arena; Cleveland, Ohio
NCAA Tournament
Mar 17, 2006*	(12 OAK)	vs. (5 OAK) No. 16 Pittsburgh; First round	L 64–79	25–9	Palace of Auburn Hills; Auburn Hills, Michigan
*Non-conference game. ^{#}Rankings from AP poll. (#) Tournament seedings in parentheses. OAK=Oakland. All times are in Eastern.
