= 2007–08 Buffalo Bulls men's basketball team =

American college basketball season

2007–08 Buffalo Bulls men's basketball
- Conference: Mid-American Conference
- East
- Record: 10-20 (3-13 MAC)
- Head coach: Reggie Witherspoon
- Home arena: Alumni Arena

2007–08 Mid-American Conference men's basketball standings
	Conf.				Overall
Team	W		L	PCT	W		L	PCT
East
Kent State †	13	–	3	.813	28	–	7	.800
Akron	11	–	5	.688	24	–	11	.686
Ohio	9	–	7	.563	20	–	13	.606
Miami (OH)	9	–	7	.563	17	–	16	.515
Bowling Green	7	–	9	.438	13	–	16	.448
Buffalo	3	–	13	.188	10	–	20	.333
West
Western Michigan	12	–	4	.750	20	–	12	.625
Central Michigan	8	–	8	.500	14	–	17	.452
Eastern Michigan	8	–	8	.500	14	–	17	.452
Toledo	7	–	8	.467	11	–	19	.367
Ball State	5	–	11	.313	6	–	24	.200
Northern Illinois	3	–	12	.200	6	–	22	.214
† 2008 MAC tournament winner Rankings from AP Poll

The 2007-08 Buffalo Bulls Men's Basketball Team represented the University at Buffalo in the college basketball season of 2007–08. The team was coached by Reggie Witherspoon. The Bulls played their home games at Alumni Arena.

Buffalo was defeated by Miami (OH) in the first round of the MAC tournament.

== Roster ==
2007–08 Buffalo Bulls men's basketball team
Players
Coaches

Pos.	#	Name	Height	Weight	Year	Hometown
G	1	Andy Robinson	6 ft 1 in (1.85 m)	190 lb (86 kg)	Jr	Schenectady, New York
G	2	Byron Mulkey	6 ft 0 in (1.83 m)	170 lb (77 kg)	So	Wheatfield, New York
G	3	Sean Smiley	6 ft 1 in (1.85 m)	165 lb (75 kg)	So	Erie, Pennsylvania
G	12	Rodney Pierce	6 ft 2 in (1.88 m)	195 lb (88 kg)	So	Buffalo, New York
F/C	15	Vadim Fedotov	6 ft 9 in (2.06 m)	260 lb (118 kg)	Jr	Munich, Germany
F	21	Andrew Atman	7 ft 0 in (2.13 m)	210 lb (95 kg)	Sr	Pittsburgh, Pennsylvania
G	22	John Boyer	6 ft 1 in (1.85 m)	185 lb (84 kg)	So	Hollidaysport, Pennsylvania
G/F	25	Calvin Betts	6 ft 3 in (1.91 m)	225 lb (102 kg)	So	Rochester, New York
F	32	Jawaan Alston	6 ft 8 in (2.03 m)	220 lb (100 kg)	Fr	Uniontown, Pennsylvania
F	33	Adekambi Laleye	6 ft 9 in (2.06 m)	210 lb (95 kg)	So	Ottawa, Ontario
G/F	24	Greg Gamble	6 ft 4 in (1.93 m)	210 lb (95 kg)	Jr	Niagara Falls, New York
F	35	Brian Addison	6 ft 8 in (2.03 m)	225 lb (102 kg)	Jr	Queens, New York
F	40	Max Boudreau	6 ft 7 in (2.01 m)	230 lb (104 kg)	So	Montreal, Quebec
G/F	42	Dave Barnett	6 ft 5 in (1.96 m)	200 lb (91 kg)	Fr	East Aurora, New York
F	44	Christian Schmidt	6 ft 8 in (2.03 m)	210 lb (95 kg)	Jr	Chemnitz, Germany

Head coach

Reggie Witherspoon

Assistant coach(es)

Legend

- (C) Team captain
- (S) Suspended
- (I) Ineligible
- (W) Walk-on
- Injured
- Current redshirt

== Schedule ==
Date time, TV	Rank^{#}	Opponent^{#}	Result	Record	Site (attendance) city, state
Exhibition
November 2, 2007*; 7:00		Buffalo State College; Exhibition	W 113-48		Alumni Arena; Amherst, New York
Regular season
November 7, 2007*; 4:00		vs. Ohio Valley; Coaches Vs. Cancer Classic	W 89-82	1-0	Gampel Pavilion; Storrs, CT
November 8, 2007*; 9:00, ESPNU		vs. UConn; Coaches Vs. Cancer Classic	L 52-87	1-1	Gampel Pavilion; Storrs, CT
November 13, 2007*; 7:00		South Florida	W 76-69	2-1	Alumni Arena; Amherst, New York
November 20, 2007*; 7:05		at Niagara	L 68-80	2-2	Gallagher Center; Lewiston, New York
November 23, 2007*; 7:30		at No. 2 Pitt	L 45-92	2-3	Petersen Events Center; Pittsburgh, Pennsylvania
November 27, 2007*; 7:00		Canisius	W 68-59	3-3	Alumni Arena; Amherst, New York
November 29, 2007*; 7:00		Tulane	W 65-51	4-3	Alumni Arena; Amherst, New York
December 1, 2007*; 7:00		Evansville	W 81-60	5-3	Alumni Arena; Amherst, New York
December 5, 2007*; 7:00		at Florida International	L 63-76	5-4	Pharmed Arena; Miami, Florida
December 21, 2007*; 9:00		vs. Wyoming; Sun Bowl Tournament	L 63-66	5-5	Don Haskins Center; El Paso, Texas
December 22, 2007*; 5:00		vs. USC Upstate; Sun Bowl Tournament	W 80-66	6-5	Don Haskins Center; El Paso, Texas
December 29, 2007*; 2:00		at UNC-Asheville	L 90-101 ^{OT}	6-6	Justice Center; Asheville, NC
January 6, 2008; 2:00		at Kent State	L 63-68	6-7 (0-1)	Memorial Athletic and Convocation Center; Kent, OH
January 12, 2008; 7:00		Akron	L 68-76	6-8 (0-2)	Alumni Arena; Amherst, New York
January 17, 2008; 7:00		at Bowling Green	L 70-83	6-9 (0-3)	Anderson Arena; Bowling Green, OH
January 20, 2008; 2:00		at Miami (OH)	L 57-64	6-10 (0-4)	Millett Hall; Oxford, OH
January 23, 2008; 7:00		Ohio	L 59-68	6-11 (0-5)	Alumni Arena; Amherst, New York
January 26, 2008; 7:00		at Toledo	L 63-76	6-12 (0-6)	Savage Hall; Toledo, OH
January 29, 2008; 7:00		Western Michigan	L 90-100 ^{2OT}	6-13 (0-7)	Alumni Arena; Amherst, New York
February 2, 2008; 6:30		at Central Michigan	L 96-100 ^{2OT}	6-14 (0-8)	Daniel P. Rose Center; Mount Pleasant, Michigan
February 5, 2008; 8:00		at Northern Illinois	W 89-81	7-14 (1-8)	Convocation Center; Dekalb, Illinois
February 10, 2008; 4:00		Eastern Michigan	W 68-64	8-14 (2-8)	Alumni Arena; Amherst, New York
February 13, 2008; 7:00		Ball State	L 67-76	8-15 (2-9)	Alumni Arena; Amherst, New York
February 16, 2008; 7:00		Miami (OH)	L 55-64	8-16 (2-10)	Alumni Arena; Amherst, New York
February 19, 2008; 7:00		Kent State	L 66-76	8-17 (2-11)	Alumni Arena; Amherst, New York
February 23, 2008*; TBA		Youngstown State; ESPN Bracket Buster	W 95-82	9-17 (2-11)	Alumni Arena; Amherst, New York
March 1, 2008; 7:00		at Akron	L 56-76	9-18 (2-12)	James A. Rhodes Arena; Akron, Ohio
March 4, 2008; 7:00		Bowling Green	W 96-50	10-18 (3-12)	Alumni Arena; Amherst, New York
March 9, 2008; 2:00		at Ohio	L 80-94	10-19 (3-13)	Convocation Center; Athens, Ohio
MAC tournament
March 12, 2008		vs. Miami; MAC tournament	L 68-69	10-20 (3-13)	Quicken Loans Arena; Cleveland, Ohio
*Non-conference game. ^{#}Rankings from Coaches' Poll. (#) Tournament seedings in parentheses.
