= 2007–08 Eastern Michigan Eagles men's basketball team =

American college basketball season

2007–08 Eastern Michigan Eagles men's basketball
- Conference: Mid-American Conference
- West Division
- Record: 14–17 (8–8 MAC)
- Head coach: Charles E. Ramsey (3 season)
- Assistant coaches: Derrick McDowell; Carl Thomas; Dave Donnelly
- Home arena: Convocation Center

2007–08 Mid-American Conference men's basketball standings
	Conf.				Overall
Team	W		L	PCT	W		L	PCT
East
Kent State †	13	–	3	.813	28	–	7	.800
Akron	11	–	5	.688	24	–	11	.686
Ohio	9	–	7	.563	20	–	13	.606
Miami (OH)	9	–	7	.563	17	–	16	.515
Bowling Green	7	–	9	.438	13	–	16	.448
Buffalo	3	–	13	.188	10	–	20	.333
West
Western Michigan	12	–	4	.750	20	–	12	.625
Central Michigan	8	–	8	.500	14	–	17	.452
Eastern Michigan	8	–	8	.500	14	–	17	.452
Toledo	7	–	8	.467	11	–	19	.367
Ball State	5	–	11	.313	6	–	24	.200
Northern Illinois	3	–	12	.200	6	–	22	.214
† 2008 MAC tournament winner Rankings from AP Poll

The 2007–08 Eastern Michigan Eagles men's basketball team represented Eastern Michigan University during the 2007–08 NCAA Division I men's basketball season. The Eagles, led by 3rd year head coach Charles E. Ramsey, played their home games at the Eastern Michigan University Convocation Center and were members of the West Division of the Mid-American Conference. They finished the season 14–17, 8–8 in MAC play. They team finished 2nd in the MAC West. They were knocked out in the 2nd round of the MAC Tournament by Western Michigan. The team captains were Carlos Medlock, Travis Lewis and Jesse Bunkley.

== Roster ==
Number	Name	Position	Height	Weight	Year	Hometown	HS/Previous
0	Nenad Banjanin	Forward	6–7	215	Senior	Belgrade, Serbia	Lon Morris J.C.
2	Solomon Farris	Wing	6–4	200	Freshman	Detroit, Michigan	Osborn
3	Carlos Medlock	Guard	6–0	186	Junior	Detroit, Michigan	Murray Wright
5	Tyler Jones	Guard	6–2	210	Junior	Belleville, Michigan	Belleville
10	Jarred Axon	Guard	5–11	180	Senior	Jackson, Michigan	Schoolcraft C.C
12	L.J. Frazier	Guard	5–10	160	Freshman	Ypsilanti, Michigan	Ypsilanti
15	Will Cooper	Wing	6–6	180	Redshirt Freshman	Detroit, Michigan	Bridgton Academy
20	Zane Gay	Guard	6–5	201	Junior	Olivet, Michigan	Olivet
21	Wendale Farrow	Wing	6–7	210	Junior	Sacramento, California	American River J.C.
22	Merlynd Ameti	Guard	6–0	175	Freshman	Detroit, Michigan	Annapolis
23	Jesse Bunkley	Guard	6–5	208	Senir	Detroit, Michigan	Mott C.C.
25	Justin Dobbins	Forward	6–8	240	Sophomore	Cleveland, Ohio	Glenville
32	Travis Lewis	Guard	6–2	200	Senior	Kalamazoo, Michigan	Loy Norrix
33	Brandon Bowdry	Forward	6–6	229	Sophomore	St. Louis, Missouri	Taylor (Mich.) Truman
34	Kyle Dodd	Center	6–11	210	Junior	Rockwood, Ontario	John F. Ross Collegiate and Vocational Institute

== Coaching staff ==
Name	Position	College	Graduating year
Charles Ramsey	Head coach	Eastern Michigan University	1992
Derrick McDowell	Associate Coach	Stetson University	1983
Carl Thomas	Assistant coach	Eastern Michigan University	2000
Dave Donnelly	Assistant coach	Sauk Valley College	1995
Rich Marion	Director of Basketball Operations	Eastern Michigan	1996

== Schedule ==
Date time, TV	Rank^{#}	Opponent^{#}	Result	Record	High points	High rebounds	High assists	Site (attendance) city, state
October 31, 2007*; 8:00 pm		Northwood; Exhibition	W 75–56		17 – Axon	7 – Banjanin	– N/A	Convocation Center; Ypsilanti, Michigan
November 9, 2007*; 12:00 pm		Brown; Education Day	L 55–74	0–1	15 – Farrow	6 – Axon, Farrow	6 – Medlock	Convocation Center (2136); Ypsilanti, Michigan
November 11, 2007*; 4:00 pm		Radford	W 72–55	1–1	16 – Medlock	9 – Farrow	4 – Axon, Medlock	Convocation Center (489); Ypsilanti, Michigan
November 17, 2007*; 6:00 pm		at Oakland	L 71–86	1–2	19 – Bunkley	7 – Farrow	5 – Axon	Athletics Center O'rena (1825); Auburn Hills, Michigan
November 21, 2007*; 7:00 pm		at Manhattan	W 61–57	2–2	22 – Dobbins	14 – Dobbins	9 – Medlock	Draddy Gymnasium (1647); Bronx, New York
November 24, 2007*; 4:00 pm		at St. Bonaventure	W 63–60	3–2	17 – Bunkley	9 – Dobbins	6 – Medlock	Reilly Center (3689); St. Bonaventure, New York
November 28, 2007*; 7:00 pm		Detroit	L 68–72	3–3	21 – Medlock	5 – Dobins, Dodd, Lewis	3 – Bunkley	Convocation Center (1099); Ypsilanti, Michigan
December 01, 2007*; 7:00 pm		at Notre Dame	L 65–76	3–4	26 – Dobbins	4 – Jones, Lewis	6 – Medlock	Edmund P. Joyce Center (9277); Notre Dame, Indiana
December 04, 2007*; 7:00 pm		Illinois State	W 72–63	4–4	18 – Medlock	8 – Dobbins	3 – Bunkley	Convocation Center (385); Ypsilanti, Michigan
December 22, 2007*; 2:00 pm		at Temple	L 55–58	4–5	19 – Medlock	10 – Lewis	3 – Lewis, Medlock	Liacouras Center (3725); Philadelphia, Pennsylvania
December 28, 2007*; 5:00 pm		vs. No. 25 Rhode Island; Texas A&M Corpus Christi Islander Invitational	L 75–92	4–6	12 – Gay	4 – Farrow	4 – Medlock	American Bank Center (2065); Corpus Christi, Texas
December 29, 2007*; 8:30 pm		at Texas A&M Corpus Christi; Texas A&M Corpus Christi Islander Invitational	L 72–75 ^{OT}	4–7	16 – Medlock	7 – Lewis	6 – Medlock	American Bank Center (1807); Corpus Christi, Texas
January 02, 2008*; 7:00 pm		Chicago State	L 68–72	4–8	16 – Bunkley	11 – Lewis	6 – Medlock	Convocation Center (507); Ypsilanti, Michigan
January 06, 2008; 2:00 pm		at Central Michigan; Michigan MAC Trophy	L 53–62	4–9 (0–1)	10 – Gay	5 – Dobbins, Lewis, Medlock	5 – Medlock	Daniel P. Rose Center (1544); Mount Pleasant, Michigan
January 12, 2008; 4:00 pm		Western Michigan; Michigan MAC Trophy	W 81–71	5–9 (1–1)	16 – Medock	11 – Lewis	3 – Lewis, Medlock	Convocation Center (1397); Ypsilanti, Michigan
January 16, 2008; 7:00 pm		at Northern Illinois	W 65–61	6–9 (2–1)	23 – Axon	7 – Dobbins	4 – Gay	Convocation Center (1653); DeKalb, Illinois
January 19, 2008; 1:00 pm, Comcast		at Ball State	L 60–64	6–10 (2–2)	21 – Medlock	6 – Lewis	4 – Benjanin, Medlock	John E. Worthen Arena (2949); Muncie, Indiana
January 22, 2008; 7:00 pm, Comcast Local		Toledo	W 68–44	7–10 (3–2)	20 – Medlock	7 – Lewis	6 – Bunkley	Convocation Center (879); Ypsilanti, Michigan
January 26, 2008; 4:00 pm		at Miami	L 52–65	7–11 (3–3)	15 – Medlock	7 – Lewis	7 – Lewis	Millett Hall (2464); Oxford, Ohio
January 30, 2008; 7:00 pm		Kent State	L 67–77	7–12 (3–4)	17 – Medlock	8 – Farrow	3 – Axon, Lewis	Convocation Center (559); Ypsilanti, Michigan
February 02, 2008; 7:00 pm		at Akron	L 61–80	7–13 (3–5)	17 – Jones	5 – Lewis	3 – Cooper	James A. Rhodes Arena (4301); Akron, Ohio
February 06, 2008; 7:00 pm		Ohio	W 63–56	8–13 (4–5)	18 – Axon	6 – Medlock	5 – Medlock	Convocation Center (344); Ypsilanti, Michigan
February 10, 2008; 4:00pm		at Buffalo	L 64–68	8–14 (4–6)	15 – Bunkley	8 – Medlock	6 – Medlock	Alumni Arena (2069); Amherst, New York
February 13, 2008; 7:00 pm, Comcast Local		Bowling Green	W 78–68	9–14 (5–6)	26 – Medlock	6 – Gay	5 – Medlock	Convocation Center (479); Ypsilanti, Michigan
February 16, 2008; 2:00 pm		Central Michigan; Michigan MAC Trophy	W 67–64	10–14 (6–6)	15 – Dobbins	6 – Dobbins, Lewis	2 – Axon, Bunkley, Dobbins, Lewis	Convocation Center (1797); Ypsilanti, Michigan
February 20, 2008; 9:00 pm, ESPNU		at Western Michigan; Michigan MAC Trophy	L 52–70	10–15 (6–7)	11 – Medlock	5 – Bunkley	3 – Bunkley, Medlock	University Arena (3014); Kalamazoo, Michigan
February 23, 2008*; 4:00 pm		Southeast Missouri State; ESPN Bracket Buster	W 86–82	11–15	29 – Axon	7 – Jones	6 – Medlock	Convocation Center (1139); Ypsilanti, Michigan
March 01, 2008; 2:00pm, Ball State Sports Network		Ball State	W 75–64	12–15 (7–7)	20 – Medlock	9 – Lewis	6 – Medlock	Convocation Center (768); Ypsilanti, Michigan
March 04, 2008; 7:00pm		at Toledo	L 63–72	12–16 (7–8)	20 – Medlock	7 – Bunkley	4 – Bunkley	Savage Arena (3322); Toledo, Ohio
March 9, 2008; 2:00pm		Northern Illinois; Senior Day	W 82–63	13–16 (8–8)	23 – Medlock	9 – Lewis	5 – Medlock	Convocation Center (827); Ypsilanti, Michigan
March 12, 2008; 12:30pm		vs. Ball State; MAC Tournament	W 59–55	14–16 (6–10)	21 – Dobbins	10 – Lewis	3 – Dobbins	Quicken Loans Arena; Cleveland, Ohio
March 13, 2008; 12:00pm, FSN Ohio, FSN Plus		vs. Western Michigan; MAC Tournament	L 62–70	14–17	15 – Bunkley	8 – Lewis	4 – Medlock	Quicken Loans Arena; Cleveland, Ohio
*Non-conference game. ^{#}Rankings from AP Poll. (#) Tournament seedings in parentheses.

== Awards ==
All-MAC Honorable Mention

- Carlos Medlock

MAC Player of the Week

- Nov. 13, 2007 Carlos Medlock

Texas A&M Corpus Christi Islander Invitational

- Carlos Medlock
