= Al Fisher =

American basketball guard

Personal information
- Born: September 7, 1986 (age 39) Pennsauken Township, New Jersey, U.S.
- Listed height: 6 ft 1 in (1.85 m)
- Listed weight: 185 lb (84 kg)

Career information
- High school: Pennsauken (Pennsauken, New Jersey)
- College: Siena (2004–2005); Redlands CC (2006–2007); Kent State (2007–2009)
- NBA draft: 2009: undrafted
- Playing career: 2009–2012
- Position: Guard

Career history
- 2009–2010: Akçakoca Poyraz
- 2010: Hapoel Be'eri
- 2010–2011: Ironi Ramat Gan
- 2011: Bejjeh
- 2012: Maccabi Kiryat Gat
- 2012: Elitsur Ramla

Career highlights
- MAC Player of the Year (2008); 2× First-team All-MAC (2008, 2009)

Albert Fisher (born September 7, 1986) is an American former professional basketball guard. He played in college for the Kent State Golden Flashes. He led the team to the 2008 NCAA tournament while averaging 14 points per game. The Mid-American Conference Player of the Year that season, Fisher made several big shots during the Flashes' run to the tournament.

Fisher played for Pennsauken High School during his prep years. He spent his first two years at Siena College in New York and Redlands Community College in Oklahoma before transferring to Kent State.
