= Jim Christian =

American basketball player and coach (born 1965)

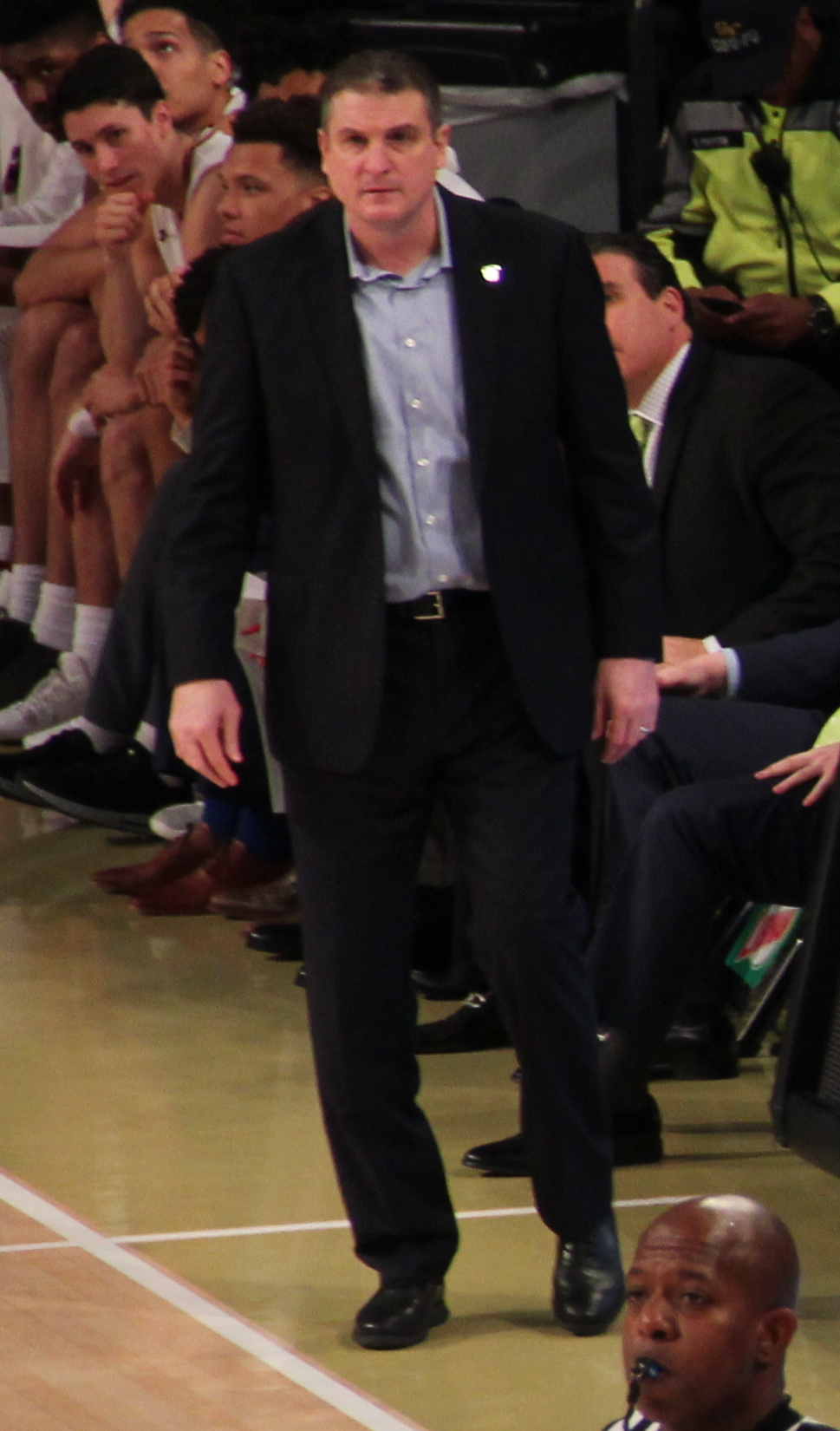
- Christian in 2019

Current position
- Title: Head coach
- Team: Canisius
- Conference: MAAC
- Record: 17–53 (.243)

Biographical details
- Born: February 6, 1965 (age 61); Bethpage, New York, U.S.

Playing career
- 1983–1985: Boston University
- 1986–1988: Rhode Island
- 1988–1989: Sydney City Comets
- Position: Guard

Coaching career (HC unless noted)
- 1990–1992: Western Kentucky (assistant)
- 1992–1994: Saint Francis (PA) (assistant)
- 1994–1995: Western Kentucky (assistant)
- 1995–1996: Miami (OH) (assistant)
- 1996–1999: Pittsburgh (assistant)
- 2001–2002: Kent State (assistant)
- 2002–2008: Kent State
- 2008–2012: TCU
- 2012–2014: Ohio
- 2014–2021: Boston College
- 2024–present: Canisius

Head coaching record
- Overall: 337–339 (.499)
- Tournaments: 0–2 (NCAA Division I); 0–5 (NIT); 1–1 (CBI); 2–1 (CIT)

Accomplishments and honors

Championships
- 2 MAC tournament (2006, 2008); 3 MAC regular season (2006, 2008, 2013); 5 MAC East Division (2003, 2004, 2006, 2008, 2013)

Awards
- 2× MAC Coach of the Year (2006, 2008)

James Patrick Christian (born February 6, 1965) is an American college basketball coach who is the head coach of the Canisius Golden Griffins. He previously served as the head coach at Boston College, Kent State, TCU and Ohio.

== Playing career ==
Christian was born in Bethpage, New York. He was an all-state guard at St. Dominic High School in nearby Oyster Bay while playing under Ralph Willard, who later was the head coach at Western Kentucky, Pittsburgh, and Holy Cross. Following his prep career, Christian was recruited by coach Rick Pitino at Boston University where he played two seasons before transferring to the University of Rhode Island. Both Willard and Pitino also attended St. Dominic High School.

Christian played his final two campaigns under Tom Penders at the University of Rhode Island, where he helped the Rams reach the Sweet Sixteen of the 1988 NCAA tournament. The former standout guard guided the Rams to victories over Missouri and Syracuse before dropping a 73–72 decision to Duke in the Sweet 16 round.

After earning his bachelor's degree in consumer affairs from the University of Rhode Island in 1988, Christian spent one season playing professionally in the Australian Basketball Association for the Sydney City Comets.

== Coaching career ==
After returning to the United States, Christian became the Western Kentucky University Hilltoppers' assistant coach under head coach Ralph Willard from 1990 to 1992. From there, Christian went on to assist head coaches Tom McConnell at Saint Francis University (1992–1994), Matt Kilcullen again at Western Kentucky University (1994–1995), Herb Sendek at Miami University (1995–1996), Ralph Willard at University of Pittsburgh (1996–1999), and Stan Heath at Kent State University (2001–2002).

=== Kent State ===
After assisting former head coach Stan Heath in the 2001–02 season, Christian became head coach at Kent State University from 2002 to 2008, where he led the Golden Flashes to six consecutive seasons of twenty or more wins, four MAC East division titles, two overall MAC titles, and two conference tournament championships. His teams also had five post-season appearances, three in the NIT and two in the NCAA Tournament. His record at Kent State was 137–59.

=== TCU ===
At Texas Christian University, Christian took over the position vacated by Neil Dougherty in March 2008. In Christian's final year coaching the Horned Frogs, he helped the program break a seven-year losing streak and gave them a bid in the College Basketball Invitational Tournament. The squad posted an 18–15 overall record, four more wins than in any season since 2004–05, and ended with its best finish ever in the Mountain West Conference at fifth place.

=== Ohio ===
On Tuesday, April 3, 2012, Christian was named the new head basketball coach at Ohio, becoming the program's 17th head coach, after former head coach John Groce left for Illinois.

In Christian's first year, the Ohio Bobcats shared the MAC regular season title with Akron with a conference record of 14–2, Ohio's first regular season title since 1994. Ohio earned themselves a No. 2 seed in the MAC tournament, where they beat Western Michigan 74–63. The following evening, Ohio lost to Akron 65–46 in the MAC Championships, losing a bid to the NCAA tournament. However, Ohio earned an at-large bid in the 2013 NIT tournament as a number 6 seed in the Alabama quadrant.

On April 3, 2014, Christian resigned his position at Ohio to become the head coach at Boston College, replacing Steve Donahue.

=== Boston College ===
On April 3, 2014, Jim Christian was named the Head Coach at Boston College. Under Christian, the Eagles saw little success, winning just 6 games in conference play in his first 3 seasons. They found some success in his fourth season, going 19–16, their best record since the 2010–2011 season. They also clinched an invitation to the NIT, their first postseason appearance since they went to the NCAA Tournament in 2009. That was however, the extent of their success under coach Christian as they finished with a losing record every other season.

After starting the 2020–2021 season 3–13, Boston College fired Jim Christian as their head coach and named Scott Spinelli their interim coach. In 7 1/2 seasons, Jim Christian was 78–132 overall, 26–94 in conference play.

=== Return to Kent State ===
On June 21, 2022, Jim Christian returned to Kent State as the Assistant Athletic Director.

=== Canisius ===
On April 8, 2024, Christian was named head coach at Canisius.

== Personal life ==
Christian and his wife, Patty, were married in the summer of 2005, and have three children, MacKenzie, Zach, and Jay.

== Head coaching record ==
Record table
Season	Team	Overall	Conference	Standing	Postseason
Kent State Golden Flashes (Mid-American Conference) (2002–2008)
2002–03	Kent State	21–10	12–6	1st (East)	NIT First Round
2003–04	Kent State	22–9	13–5	1st (East)	NIT First Round
2004–05	Kent State	20–13	11–7	T–2nd (East)	NIT First Round
2005–06	Kent State	25–9	15–3	1st (East)	NCAA Division I Round of 64
2006–07	Kent State	21–11	12–4	2nd (East)	
2007–08	Kent State	28–7	13–3	1st (East)	NCAA Division I Round of 64
Kent State:		137–59 (.699)	76–28 (.731)		
TCU Horned Frogs (Mountain West Conference) (2008–2012)
2008–09	TCU	14–17	5–11	7th	
2009–10	TCU	13–19	5–11	7th	
2010–11	TCU	11–22	1–15	9th	
2011–12	TCU	18–15	7–7	5th	CBI Quarterfinal
TCU:		56–73 (.434)	18–44 (.290)		
Ohio Bobcats (Mid-American Conference) (2012–2014)
2012–13	Ohio	24–10	14–2	T–1st (East)	NIT First Round
2013–14	Ohio	25–12	11–7	3rd (East)	CIT Quarterfinal
Ohio:		49–22 (.690)	25–9 (.735)		
Boston College Eagles (Atlantic Coast Conference) (2014–2021)
2014–15	Boston College	13–19	4–14	13th	
2015–16	Boston College	7–25	0–18	15th	
2016–17	Boston College	9–23	2–16	15th	
2017–18	Boston College	19–16	7–11	12th	NIT First Round
2018–19	Boston College	14–17	5–13	T–11th	
2019–20	Boston College	13–19	7–13	T–10th	
2020–21	Boston College	3–13	1–9	15th	
Boston College:		78–132 (.371)	26–94 (.217)		
Canisius Golden Griffins (MAAC) (2024–present)
2024–25	Canisius	3–28	3–17	13th	
2025–26	Canisius	10–21	5–15	T–11th	
Canisius Golden Griffins (Metro Conference) (2026–present)
2026–27	Canisius	4–4	0–0		
Canisius:		17–53 (.243)	8–32 (.200)		
Total:		337–339 (.499)			
National champion Postseason invitational champion Conference regular season champion Conference regular season and conference tournament champion Division regular season champion Division regular season and conference tournament champion Conference tournament champion
