= Joe Reitz =

American basketball and football player (born 1985)

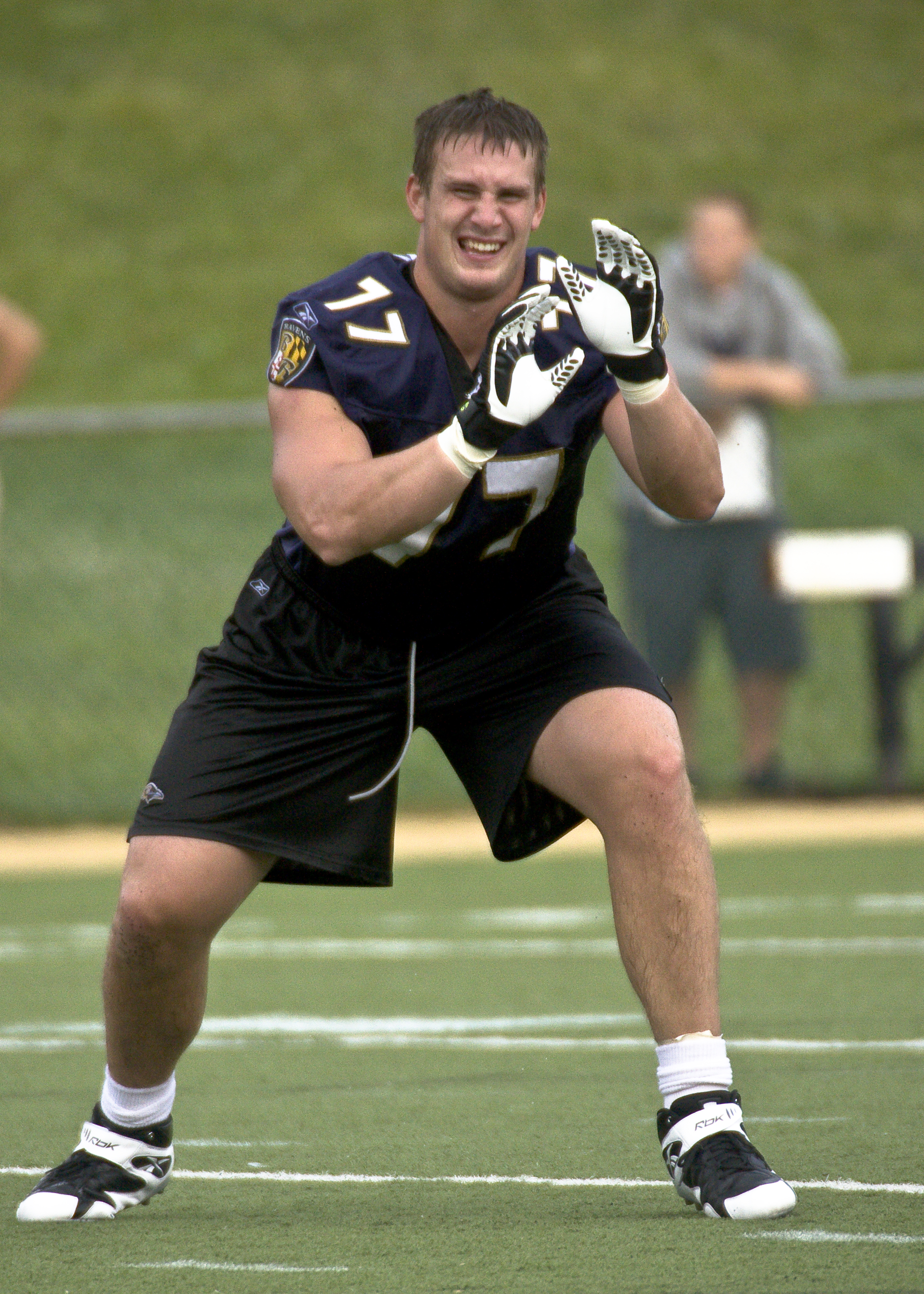
- Reitz with the Baltimore Ravens in 2008

No. 76
- Position: Offensive tackle

Personal information
- Born: August 24, 1985 (age 41); Indianapolis, Indiana, U.S.
- Listed height: 6 ft 7 in (2.01 m)
- Listed weight: 325 lb (147 kg)

Career information
- High school: Hamilton Southeastern (Fishers, Indiana)
- College: Western Michigan
- NFL draft: 2008: undrafted

Career history
- Baltimore Ravens (2008–2010)*; Miami Dolphins (2010)*; Indianapolis Colts (2010–2016)
- * Offseason or practice squad member only

Career NFL statistics
- Games played: 66
- Games started: 42
- Stats at Pro Football Reference

Joseph David Reitz (born August 24, 1985) is an American former professional football player who was an offensive tackle for the Indianapolis Colts of the National Football League (NFL). He was signed by the Baltimore Ravens as an undrafted free agent in 2008. He attended Western Michigan University where he played college basketball and not football.

== College basketball career ==
Reitz was an all-state high school football player at Hamilton Southeastern High School, but he decided to play college basketball at Western Michigan University. He finished as the third all-time leading scorer and rebounder. Reitz also played in more games than any other player in WMU men's basketball history.

In his senior season, Reitz helped lead the Broncos to a Mid-American Conference West Division title and was named First-team All-MAC for both the regular season and conference tournament. Reitz was also a member of the Academic All-MAC Team.

== Professional career ==
=== Baltimore Ravens ===
Reitz was signed by Baltimore with the intention of playing as a tight end but was groomed to play offensive tackle because of his athleticism. Reitz, undersized for an offensive lineman, left college at 250 lb (110 kg), entered training camp at 270 lb (120 kg), and wanted to reach 300 lb (140 kg) by the start of the NFL season.

Reitz entered the 2008 NFL season as a member of the Ravens practice squad. On October 1, 2008, the Ravens placed Reitz on injured reserve with a shoulder injury. While still a member of the Ravens, the move effectively ended his 2008 season.

In January 2009, Reitz was re-signed by the Ravens, and he entered the 2009 NFL season as a member of the Ravens practice squad. In January 2010 Reitz re-signed a reserve future contract. He was cut on September 4.

=== Miami Dolphins ===
On September 5, 2010, Reitz was claimed off waivers by the Miami Dolphins. He was waived on September 8.

=== Indianapolis Colts ===
On September 8, 2010, Reitz was claimed off waivers by the Colts from the Miami Dolphins. He was waived on September 15. He was re-signed to the practice squad on September 19. He was signed off the practice squad for the Colts first round playoff game. In 2011, he began to see his first extensive playing time with the Colts. He was named the starter at left guard on August 16, 2011 He ultimately appeared in 11 games with the Colts, nine of which were starts. Reitz entered the 2012 season as competitor for playing time at right guard. After being named the starter, he suffered a knee injury which required arthroscopic surgery. He also missed time after suffering a concussion in Week 13 and then again in Week 17. He ultimately appeared in nine games, starting eight. He appeared in 14 games during the 2013 season, with three starts. He remained with the Colts entering the 2014 season after he signed a one-year, $1.431 million qualifying offer as a restricted free agent. He appeared in 10 games that season, four of which he started. On March 10, 2015, he signed another contract extension. On March 7, 2017, he announced his retirement from the NFL.

== Personal life ==
Reitz married his college sweetheart, Jill, in July 2010. Jill is a former track and field and cross country standout for Western Michigan. They have two daughters, Julianna, born in 2011 and Virginia, born in 2014 and two sons, AJ, born in 2013 and John, born in 2017. Reitz and his wife now have 8 children.

== See also ==
- 2007–08 Western Michigan Broncos men's basketball team
- Western Michigan Broncos men's basketball
