= Jerome Tillman =

American basketball player

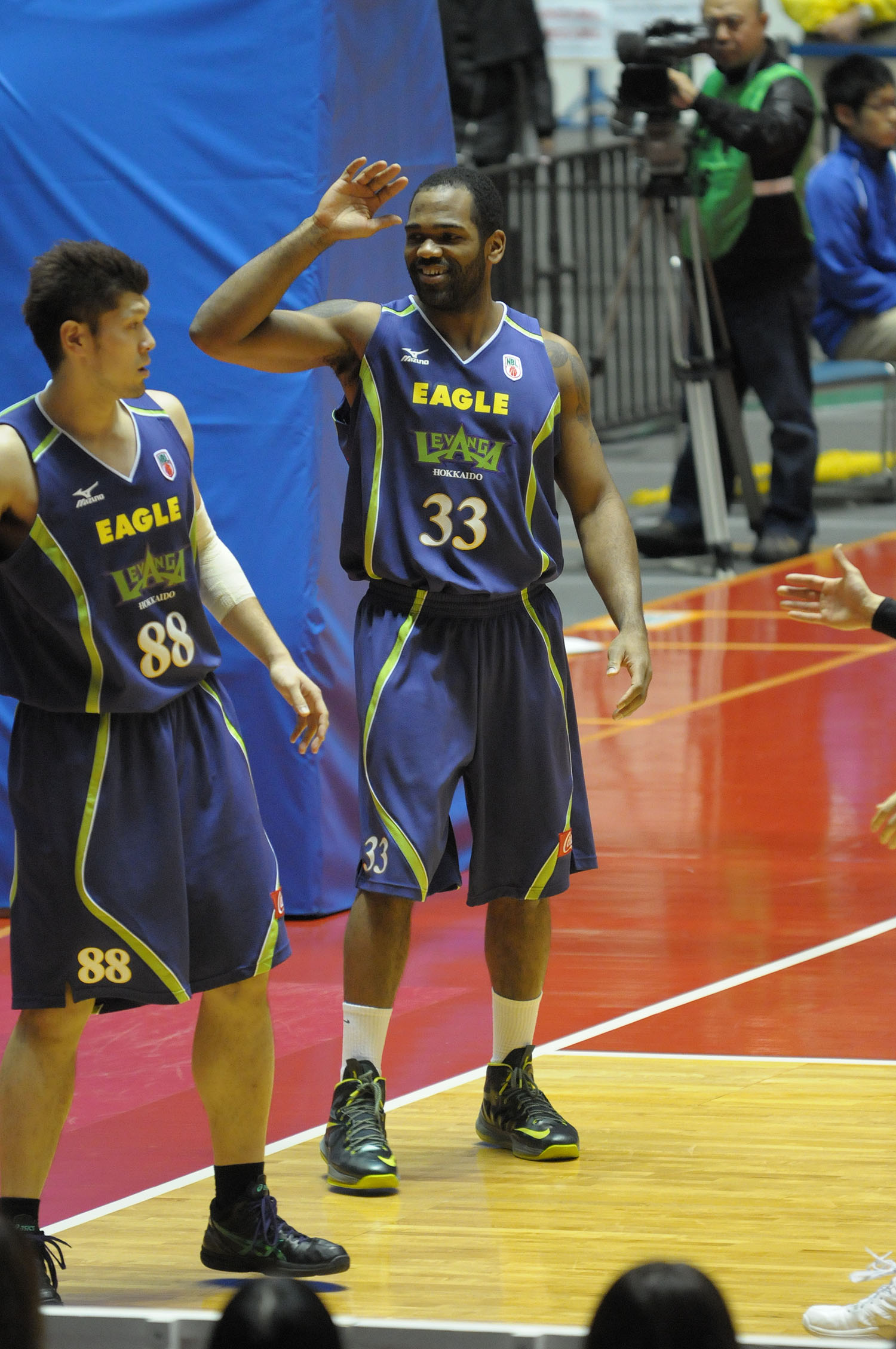
- Tillman (33) in 2014

Personal information
- Born: April 25, 1987 (age 39) Beavercreek, Ohio, U.S.
- Listed height: 6 ft 7 in (2.01 m)
- Listed weight: 238 lb (108 kg)

Career information
- High school: Beavercreek (Beavercreek, Ohio)
- College: Ohio (2005–2009)
- NBA draft: 2009: undrafted
- Playing career: 2009–2023
- Position: Power forward

Career history
- 2009–2010: Élan Chalon
- 2010–2011: Mitteldeutscher BC
- 2011–2012: CB Atapuerca
- 2012–2013: Hapoel Eilat B.C.
- 2013–2016: Levanga Hokkaido
- 2016–2018: Nagoya Diamond Dolphins
- 2018–2020: Sendai 89ers
- 2020–2021: Toyotsu Fighting Eagles Nagoya
- 2021-2022: Kyoto Hannaryz
- 2023: Tryhoop Okayama
- 2023: Akita Northern Happinets

Jerome Tillman (born April 25, 1987) is an American former professional basketball player. He played collegiate basketball at Ohio University. He averaged 15.9 points and 8.2 rebounds per game with Sendai 89ers during the 2019-20 season. Tillman signed with Toyotsu Fighting Eagles Nagoya on June 29, 2020.

== Career statistics ==
Legend
GP	Games played	GS	Games started	MPG	Minutes per game
FG%	Field goal percentage	3P%	3-point field goal percentage	FT%	Free throw percentage
RPG	Rebounds per game	APG	Assists per game	SPG	Steals per game
BPG	Blocks per game	PPG	Points per game	**Bold**	Career high

Year	Team	GP	GS	MPG	FG%	3P%	FT%	RPG	APG	SPG	BPG	PPG
2013-14	Hokkaido	54	54	19.6	.538	.402	.767	8.9	1.5	1.2	0.7	19.6
2014-15	Hokkaido	54	54	35.5	.524	.306	.729	9.8	1.8	2.0	0.9	22.8
2015-16	Hokkaido	55	55	35.3	.502	.354	.736	9.7	1.2	1.5	0.6	23.5
2016-17	Nagoya D	56	17	26.9	.451	.373	.780	7.3	0.8	1.0	0.3	16.2
2017-18	Nagoya D	60	1	17.4	.416	.335	.794	3.9	1.0	0.5	0.1	9.1
