= 2003–04 Mid-American Conference men's basketball season =

- League: NCAA Division I
- Sport: Basketball
- Teams: 13

Regular season
- League champions: Western Michigan
- Runners-up: Kent State
- Season MVP: Mike Williams

Tournament
- Champions: Western Michigan
- Runners-up: Kent State
- Finals MVP: Mike Williams

Mid-American men's basketball seasons
- ← 2002–03 2004–05 →

2003–04 Mid-American Conference men's basketball standings
	Conf.				Overall
Team	W		L	PCT	W		L	PCT
East
Kent State	13	–	5	.722	22	–	9	.710
Miami (OH)	12	–	6	.667	18	–	11	.621
Buffalo	11	–	7	.611	17	–	12	.586
Marshall	8	–	10	.444	12	–	17	.414
Akron	7	–	11	.389	13	–	15	.464
Ohio	7	–	11	.389	10	–	20	.333
West
Western Michigan†	15	–	3	.833	26	–	5	.839
Toledo	12	–	6	.667	20	–	11	.645
Ball State	10	–	8	.556	14	–	15	.483
Bowling Green	8	–	10	.444	14	–	17	.452
Eastern Michigan	7	–	11	.389	13	–	15	.464
Northern Illinois	5	–	13	.278	10	–	20	.333
Central Michigan	2	–	16	.111	6	–	24	.200
† 2004 MAC tournament winner Rankings from AP Poll

The 2003–04 Mid-American Conference men's basketball season began with practices in October 2003, followed by the start of the 2003–04 NCAA Division I men's basketball season in November. Conference play began in January 2004 and concluded in March 2004. Western Michigan won the regular season title with a conference record of 15–3 by two games over second-place Kent State. Western Michigan defeated Kent State in the MAC tournament final and represented the MAC in the NCAA tournament. There they lost in the first round to Vanderbilt.

== Preseason awards ==
The preseason poll was announced by the league office on October 23, 2003.

=== Preseason men's basketball poll ===
Northern Illinois was picked by the media to win the West Division while Miami was tabbed as the favorite in the East.

=== Honors ===
Honor	Recipient
Preseason All-MAC East	Johnny Hollingsworth, Akron
Preseason All-MAC East	Derrick Tarver, Akron
Preseason All-MAC East	Turner Battle, Buffalo
Preseason All-MAC East	Eric Haut, Kent State
Preseason All-MAC East	Juby Johnson, Miami
Preseason All-MAC West	Kevin Netter, Bowling Green
Preseason All-MAC West	Marcus Smallwood, Northern Illinois
Preseason All-MAC West	P.J. Smith, Northern Illinois
Preseason All-MAC West	Keith Triplett, Toledo
Preseason All-MAC West	Anthony Kann, Western Michigan

== Postseason ==
=== Postseason awards ===
1. Coach of the Year: Reggie Witherspoon, Buffalo
2. Player of the Year: Mike Williams, Western Michigan
3. Freshman of the Year: Justin Ingram, Toledo
4. Defensive Player of the Year: John Edwards, Kent State
5. Sixth Man of the Year: Reggie Berry, Western Michigan

=== Honors ===
Honor	Recipient
Postseason All-MAC First Team	John Edwards, Kent State
Postseason All-MAC First Team	Juby Johnson, Miami
Postseason All-MAC First Team	Keith Triplett, Toledo
Postseason All-MAC First Team	Ben Reed, Western Michigan
Postseason All-MAC First Team	Mike Williams, Western Michigan
Postseason All-MAC Second Team	Derrick Tarver, Akron
Postseason All-MAC Second Team	Turner Battle, Buffalo
Postseason All-MAC Second Team	Ronald Lewis, Bowling Green
Postseason All-MAC Second Team	Eric Haut, Kent State
Postseason All-MAC Second Team	Marvin Black, Marshall
Postseason All-MAC Honorable Mention	Cameron Echols, Ball State
Postseason All-MAC Honorable Mention	Kevin Netter, Bowling Green
Postseason All-MAC Honorable Mention	Gerrit Brigitha, Central Michigan
Postseason All-MAC Honorable Mention	DeAndre Haynes, Kent State
Postseason All-MAC Honorable Mention	Chet Mason, Miami
Postseason All-MAC Honorable Mention	Marcus Smallwood, Northern Illinois
Postseason All-MAC Honorable Mention	P.J. Smith, Northern Illinois
Postseason All-MAC Honorable Mention	Jaivon Harris, Ohio
Postseason All-MAC Honorable Mention	Sammy Villegas, Toledo
Postseason All-MAC Honorable Mention	Anthony Kann, Western Michigan
All-MAC Freshman Team	Jeremiah Wood, Akron
All-MAC Freshman Team	Peyton Stovall, Ball State
All-MAC Freshman Team	Yassin Idbihi, Buffalo
All-MAC Freshman Team	Sonny Troutman, Ohio
All-MAC Freshman Team	Justin Ingram, Toledo

== See also ==
2003–04 Mid-American Conference women's basketball season
