= 2006–07 Mid-American Conference men's basketball season =

- League: NCAA Division I
- Sport: Basketball
- Teams: 12

Regular season
- League champions: Toledo
- Runners-up: Akron
- Season MVP: Romeo Travis

Tournament
- Champions: Miami
- Runners-up: Akron
- Finals MVP: Tim Pollitz

Mid-American men's basketball seasons
- ← 2005–06 2007–08 →

2006–07 Mid-American Conference men's basketball standings
	Conf.				Overall
Team	W		L	PCT	W		L	PCT
East
Akron	13	–	3	.813	26	–	7	.788
Kent State	12	–	4	.750	21	–	11	.656
Miami (OH) †	10	–	6	.625	18	–	15	.545
Ohio	9	–	7	.563	19	–	13	.594
Buffalo	4	–	12	.250	12	–	19	.387
Bowling Green	3	–	13	.188	13	–	18	.419
West
Toledo	14	–	2	.875	19	–	13	.594
Western Michigan	9	–	7	.563	16	–	16	.500
Central Michigan	7	–	9	.438	13	–	18	.419
Eastern Michigan	6	–	10	.375	13	–	19	.406
Ball State	5	–	11	.313	9	–	22	.290
Northern Illinois	4	–	12	.250	7	–	23	.233
† 2007 MAC tournament winner Rankings from AP Poll

The 2006–07 Mid-American Conference men's basketball season began with practices in October 2006, followed by the start of the 2006–07 NCAA Division I men's basketball season in November. Conference play began in January 2007 and concluded in March 2007. Toledo won the regular season title with a conference record of 14–2 over second-place Akron. Fourth-seeded Miami defeated Akron in the final. In the NCAA tournament they lost in the first round to Oregon.

== Preseason awards ==
The preseason poll was announced by the league office on October 24, 2006.

=== Preseason men's basketball poll ===
(First place votes in parentheses)

==== East Division ====
1. Akron
2. Ohio
3. Kent State
4. Miami
5. Buffalo
6. Bowling Green

==== West Division ====
1. Toledo
2. Northern Illinois
3. Western Michigan
4. Ball State
5. Eastern Michigan
6. Central Michigan

=== Honors ===
Honor	Recipient
Preseason All-MAC East	Leon Williams, Ohio
Preseason All-MAC East	Romeo Travis, Akron
Preseason All-MAC East	Yassin Idbihi, Buffalo
Preseason All-MAC East	Martin Samarco, Bowling Green
Preseason All-MAC East	Nathan Peavy, Miami
Preseason All-MAC West	James Hughes, Northern Illinois
Preseason All-MAC West	Giordan Watson, Central Michigan
Preseason All-MAC West	Justin Ingram, Toledo
Preseason All-MAC West	Skip Mills, Ball State
Preseason All-MAC West	Joe Reitz, Western Michigan

== Postseason ==
=== Postseason awards ===
1. Coach of the Year: Stan Joplin, Toledo
2. Player of the Year: Romeo Travis, Akron
3. Freshman of the Year: David Kool, Western Michigan
4. Defensive Player of the Year: Kashif Payne, Toledo
5. Sixth Man of the Year: Cerdick Middleton, Akron

=== Honors ===
Honor	Recipient
Postseason All-MAC first team	Romeo Travis, Akron
Postseason All-MAC first team	Tim Pollitz, Miami
Postseason All-MAC first team	Giordan Watson, Central Michigan
Postseason All-MAC first team	Justin Ingram, Toledo
Postseason All-MAC first team	Jerome Tillman, Ohio
Postseason All-MAC second team	Dru Joyce, Akron
Postseason All-MAC second team	Omni Smith, Kent State
Postseason All-MAC second team	Leon Williams, Ohio
Postseason All-MAC second team	Keonta Howell, Toledo
Postseason All-MAC second team	Joe Reitz, Western Michigan
Postseason All-MAC honorable mention	Skip Mills, Ball State
Postseason All-MAC honorable mention	Nate Miller, Bowling Green
Postseason All-MAC honorable mention	Martin Samarco, Bowling Green
Postseason All-MAC honorable mention	Yassin Idbihi, Buffalo
Postseason All-MAC honorable mention	Mike Scott, Kent State
Postseason All-MAC honorable mention	Nathan Peavy, Miami
Postseason All-MAC honorable mention	Mike McKinney, Northern Illinois
Postseason All-MAC honorable mention	Sonny Troutman, Ohio
Postseason All-MAC honorable mention	Florentino Valencia, Toledo
Postseason All-MAC honorable mention	Shawntes Gary, Western Michigan
All-MAC freshman team	David Kool, Western Michigan
All-MAC freshman team	Rodriguez Sherman, Kent State
All-MAC freshman team	Chris Singletary, Kent State
All-MAC freshman team	Marko Spica, Central Michigan
All-MAC freshman team	Brandon Bowdry, Eastern Michigan

== See also ==
2006–07 Mid-American Conference women's basketball season
