= 2004–05 Mid-American Conference men's basketball season =

- League: NCAA Division I
- Sport: Basketball
- Teams: 13

Regular season
- League champions: Miami
- Season MVP: Turner Battle

Tournament
- Champions: Ohio
- Runners-up: Buffalo
- Finals MVP: Leon Williams

Mid-American men's basketball seasons

2004–05 Mid-American Conference men's basketball standings
	Conf.				Overall
Team	W		L	PCT	W		L	PCT
East
Miami (OH)	12	–	6	.667	19	–	11	.633
Buffalo	11	–	7	.611	23	–	10	.697
Ohio †	11	–	7	.611	21	–	11	.656
Akron	11	–	7	.611	19	–	10	.655
Kent State	11	–	7	.611	20	–	13	.606
Marshall	3	–	15	.167	6	–	22	.214
West
Western Michigan	11	–	7	.611	20	–	13	.606
Toledo	11	–	7	.611	16	–	13	.552
Bowling Green	10	–	8	.556	18	–	11	.621
Ball State	10	–	8	.556	15	–	13	.536
Northern Illinois	7	–	11	.389	11	–	17	.393
Eastern Michigan	5	–	13	.278	12	–	18	.400
Central Michigan	4	–	14	.222	10	–	18	.357
† 2005 MAC tournament winner Rankings from AP Poll

The 2004–05 Mid-American Conference men's basketball season began with practices in October 2004, followed by the start of the 2004–05 NCAA Division I men's basketball season in November. Conference play began in January 2005 and concluded in March 2005. Miami won the regular season title with a conference record of 12–6 by one game over a five-way tie for second place. Fourth-seeded Ohio beat Miami in the semi-finals and defeated second-seeded Buffalo in overtime in the final. Leon Williams of Ohio was named the tournament MVP. Ohio represented the MAC in the NCAA tournament. There they lost in the first round to Florida.

== Preseason awards ==
The preseason poll was announced by the league office on October 21, 2004.

=== Preseason men's basketball poll ===
Buffalo was picked by the media to win the East. Toledo was picked to win the West.

=== Honors ===
Honor	Recipient
Preseason All-MAC East	Turner Battle, Buffalo
Preseason All-MAC East	Yassin Idbihi, Buffalo
Preseason All-MAC East	DaAndre Haynes, Kent State
Preseason All-MAC East	Danny Horace, Miami
Preseason All-MAC East	Chet Mason, Miami
Preseason All-MAC West	John Reimold, Bowling Green
Preseason All-MAC West	John Bowler, Eastern Michigan
Preseason All-MAC West	Keith Triplett, Toledo
Preseason All-MAC West	Sammy Villegas, Toledo
Preseason All-MAC West	Ben Reed, Western Michigan

== Postseason ==
=== Postseason awards ===
1. Coach of the Year: Charlie Coles, Miami
2. Player of the Year: Turner Battle, Buffalo
3. Freshman of the Year: Leon Williams, Ohio
4. Defensive Player of the Year: Chet Mason, Miami
5. Sixth Man of the Year: Mark Bortz, Buffalo

=== Honors ===
Honor	Recipient
Postseason All-MAC First Team	Josh Almanson, Bowling Green
Postseason All-MAC First Team	Turner Battle, Buffalo
Postseason All-MAC First Team	Danny Horace, Miami
Postseason All-MAC First Team	Chet Mason, Miami
Postseason All-MAC First Team	Ben Reed, Western Michigan
Postseason All-MAC Second Team	Romeo Travis, Akron
Postseason All-MAC Second Team	Dennis Trammell, Ball State
Postseason All-MAC Second Team	John Reimold, Bowling Green
Postseason All-MAC Second Team	Keith Triplett, Toledo
Postseason All-MAC Second Team	Levi Rost, Western Michigan
Postseason All-MAC Honorable Mention	Darryl Peterson, Akron
Postseason All-MAC Honorable Mention	Mark Bortz, Buffalo
Postseason All-MAC Honorable Mention	Kevin Nelson, Central Michigan
Postseason All-MAC Honorable Mention	John Bowler, Eastern Michigan
Postseason All-MAC Honorable Mention	Jason Edwin, Kent State
Postseason All-MAC Honorable Mention	Kevin Warzynski, Kent State
Postseason All-MAC Honorable Mention	Mike McKinney, Northern Illinois
Postseason All-MAC Honorable Mention	Mychal Green, Ohio
Postseason All-MAC Honorable Mention	Sonny Troutman, Ohio
Postseason All-MAC Honorable Mention	Leon Williams, Ohio
All-MAC Freshman Team	Bubba Walther, Akron
All-MAC Freshman Team	Leon Williams, Ohio
All-MAC Freshman Team	Jeremy Fears, Ohio
All-MAC Freshman Team	Kashif Payne, Toledo
All-MAC Freshman Team	Joe Reitz, Western Michigan

== See also ==
2004–05 Mid-American Conference women's basketball season
