= 2004–05 Buffalo Bulls men's basketball team =

American college basketball season

2004–05 Buffalo Bulls men's basketball

NIT, First Round
- Conference: Mid-American Conference
- East
- Record: 23–10 (11–7 MAC)
- Head coach: Reggie Witherspoon (6th season)
- Assistant coaches: Jim Kwitchoff (6th season); Michael Mennenga (5th season); Chris Hawkins (5th season)
- Home arena: Alumni Arena

2004–05 Mid-American Conference men's basketball standings
	Conf.				Overall
Team	W		L	PCT	W		L	PCT
East
Miami (OH)	12	–	6	.667	19	–	11	.633
Buffalo	11	–	7	.611	23	–	10	.697
Ohio †	11	–	7	.611	21	–	11	.656
Akron	11	–	7	.611	19	–	10	.655
Kent State	11	–	7	.611	20	–	13	.606
Marshall	3	–	15	.167	6	–	22	.214
West
Western Michigan	11	–	7	.611	20	–	13	.606
Toledo	11	–	7	.611	16	–	13	.552
Bowling Green	10	–	8	.556	18	–	11	.621
Ball State	10	–	8	.556	15	–	13	.536
Northern Illinois	7	–	11	.389	11	–	17	.393
Eastern Michigan	5	–	13	.278	12	–	18	.400
Central Michigan	4	–	14	.222	10	–	18	.357
† 2005 MAC tournament winner Rankings from AP Poll

The 2004–05 Buffalo Bulls men's basketball team represented the University at Buffalo during the 2004–05 NCAA Division I men's basketball season. The Bulls, led by sixth-year head coach Reggie Witherspoon, played their home games at Alumni Arena in Amherst, New York as members of the Mid-American Conference (MAC). They finished the season 23–10, 11–7 in MAC play to finish in fifth place in the MAC East. It was the first 20-win season in the school's NCAA Division I history.

They reached the finals of the MAC men's basketball tournament for the first time in school history and at one point held a 19-point lead but ultimately lost to Ohio after a last-second tip-in in overtime. They were also invited to the National Invitation Tournament for the first time in program history and won their opening-round game against Drexel.

Writing for the Associated Press, Tom Withers described it as "Buffalo's dream season."

Following the season, Buffalo guard Turner Battle became the first Bull in program history to be named an Academic All-American, an Honorable Mention All-American, the MAC Men's Basketball Player of the Year and to the All-MAC First Team. Battle and Yassin Idbihi became the first Bulls in program history to be named to the MAC All-Tournament Team. Mark Bortz became the first Bull in program history to be named the MAC Sixth Man of the Year.

== Previous season ==
The Bulls finished the 2003–04 season with an overall record of 17–12 and a record of 11–7 in conference play. It was their first winning season since having joined the MAC for the 1998–99 season. In spite of that, they lost in the second round of the 2004 MAC tournament. Eleven of the thirteen players from the 2003–04 season, including the eleven who appeared in the most games for the 2003–04 team, returned for the 2004–05 season.

=== Departures ===
Name	Number	Pos.	Height	Weight	Year	Hometown	Notes
B. J. Walker	0	F	6'9"	245	Sophomore	Cincinnati, OH	Transferred to Garden City Community College
Marcus Henderson	4	G	5'8"	165	Freshman	Niagara Falls, NY	Declared academically ineligible

== Roster ==
2004–05 Buffalo Bulls men's basketball team
Players
Coaches

Pos.	#	Name	Height	Weight	Year	Previous school	Hometown
G	1	Jason Bird	6 ft 4 in (1.93 m)	195 lb (88 kg)	Sr	Ypsilanti High School	Ypsilanti, MI
G	3	Wallace Hall	6 ft 3 in (1.91 m)	185 lb (84 kg)	Fr	Denby High School	Detroit, MI
G	4	Darwin Young (W)	6 ft 2 in (1.88 m)	185 lb (84 kg)	So	Hutchinson Central Technical High School	Buffalo, NY
G	10	Calvin Cage	6 ft 0 in (1.83 m)	170 lb (77 kg)	Jr	Bladensburg High School	Capitol Heights, MD
G	11	Turner Battle	6 ft 3 in (1.91 m)	190 lb (86 kg)	Sr	East Forsyth High School	Kernersville, NC
F	21	Andrew Atman	7 ft 0 in (2.13 m)	210 lb (95 kg)	So	Upper St. Clair High School	Pittsburgh, PA
G	22	Roderick Middleton	6 ft 3 in (1.91 m)	210 lb (95 kg)	Jr	Brewster Academy	University Park, IL
F	23	Brian Andre	6 ft 9 in (2.06 m)	310 lb (141 kg)	So	Maine Central Institute	Bingham, ME
G	31	Daniel Gilbert	6 ft 6 in (1.98 m)	215 lb (98 kg)	Sr	Cass Technical High School	Detroit, MI
F	32	Parnell Smith	6 ft 6 in (1.98 m)	225 lb (102 kg)	So	Pike High School	Indianapolis, IN
F	33	Mario Jordan	6 ft 6 in (1.98 m)	205 lb (93 kg)	Jr	Benedictine High School	Cleveland, OH
F	35	Barnard Onyenucheya (W)	6 ft 6 in (1.98 m)	205 lb (93 kg)	Fr	John F. Kennedy High School	Bronx, NY
F	42	Mark Bortz	6 ft 10 in (2.08 m)	255 lb (116 kg)	Sr	Walled Lake Central High School	Commerce Township, MI
F	44	Christian Schmidt	6 ft 8 in (2.03 m)	210 lb (95 kg)	Fr	Schloss Hagerhof	Chemnitz, East Germany
C	45	Yassin Idbihi	6 ft 10 in (2.08 m)	280 lb (127 kg)	So	Schloss Hagerhof	Cologne, West Germany

Head coach

- Reggie Witherspoon (Wheeling)

Assistant coach(es)

- Jim Kwitchoff (Boston College)
- Michael Mennenga (Morehead State)
- Chris Hawkins (Radford)

Legend

- (C) Team captain
- (S) Suspended
- (I) Ineligible
- (W) Walk-on
- Injured
- Current redshirt

Roster

== Schedule ==
Date time, TV	Rank^{#}	Opponent^{#}	Result	Record	Site city, state
Regular season
November 20, 2004*		at No. 8 Connecticut	L 68–90	0–1	Harry A. Gampel Pavilion; Storrs, CT
November 23, 2004*		Fairleigh Dickinson	W 87–84 ^{OT}	1–1	Alumni Arena; Amherst, NY
November 27, 2004*		Indiana State	W 92–64	2–1	Alumni Arena; Amherst, NY
December 1, 2004*		Colgate	W 74–62	3–1	Alumni Arena; Amherst, NY
December 4, 2004		Western Michigan	L 53–70	3–2 (0–1)	Alumni Arena; Amherst, NY
December 7, 2004*		at Elon	W 70–63 ^{OT}	4–2 (0–1)	Alumni Gym; Elon, NC
December 11, 2004*		Niagara	W 95–92 ^{2OT}	5–2 (0–1)	Alumni Arena; Amherst, NY
December 18, 2004*		at Canisius	W 69–65	6–2 (0–1)	Koessler Athletic Center; Buffalo, NY
December 21, 2004*		at Penn State	W 72–70	7–2 (0–1)	Bryce Jordan Center; University Park, PA
January 2, 2005		at Bowling Green	L 88–95	7–3 (0–2)	Anderson Arena; Bowling Green, OH
January 6, 2005		at Central Michigan	W 83–67	8–3 (1–2)	Rose Arena; Mount Pleasant, MI
January 9, 2005		Toledo	W 56–54	9–3 (2–2)	Alumni Arena; Amherst, NY
January 12, 2005		at Akron	L 59–75	9–4 (2–3)	James A. Rhodes Arena; Akron, OH
January 15, 2005		Miami	W 67–56	10–4 (3–3)	Alumni Arena; Amherst, NY
January 19, 2005		at Kent State	L 80–85 ^{OT}	10–5 (3–4)	MAC Center; Kent, OH
January 25, 2005		Northern Illinois	W 86–80	11–5 (4–4)	Alumni Arena; Amherst, NY
January 27, 2005		Marshall	W 78–65	12–5 (5–4)	Alumni Arena; Amherst, NY
January 29, 2005		at Eastern Michigan	W 80–68	13–5 (6–4)	Convocation Center; Ypsilanti, MI
February 2, 2005		Ohio	L 90–92	13–6 (6–5)	Alumni Arena; Amherst, NY
February 5, 2005		at Miami	L 74–77 ^{OT}	13–7 (6–6)	Millett Hall; Oxford, OH
February 8, 2005		at Western Michigan	W 85–79	14–7 (7–6)	University Arena; Kalamazoo, MI
February 12, 2005		Ball State	W 67–58	15–7 (8–6)	Alumni Arena; Amherst, NY
February 15, 2005		Kent State	W 77–66	16–7 (9–6)	Alumni Arena; Amherst, NY
February 19, 2005*		at Fresno State; ESPN BracketBusters	W 52–49	17–7 (9–6)	Save Mart Center; Fresno, CA
February 23, 2005		at Marshall	W 68–55	18–7 (10–6)	Cam Henderson Center; Huntington, WV
March 2, 2005		at Ohio	L 77–90	18–8 (10–7)	Convocation Center; Athens, OH
March 5, 2005		Akron	W 72–56	19–8 (11–7)	Alumni Arena; Amherst, NY
2005 MAC Men's Basketball Tournament
March 7, 2005		Northern Illinois; First Round	W 73–66	20–8	Alumni Arena; Amherst, NY
March 10, 2005		vs. Toledo; Quarterfinal	W 85–72	21–8	Gund Arena; Cleveland, OH
March 11, 2005		vs. Western Michigan; Semifinal	W 75–68	22–8	Gund Arena; Cleveland, OH
March 12, 2005		vs. Ohio; MAC Championship	L 79–80 ^{OT}	22–9	Gund Arena; Cleveland, OH
2005 National Invitation Tournament
March 16, 2005		Drexel; Opening Round	W 81–76 ^{OT}	23–9	Alumni Arena; Amherst, NY
March 19, 2005		at Saint Joseph's; First Round	L 50–55	23–10	Hagan Arena; Philadelphia, PA
*Non-conference game. ^{#}Rankings from AP Poll. (#) Tournament seedings in parentheses.
