= 2006–07 Eastern Michigan Eagles men's basketball team =

American college basketball season

2006–07 Eastern Michigan Eagles men's basketball
- Conference: Mid-American Conference
- West Division
- Record: 13–19 (6–10 MAC)
- Head coach: Charles E. Ramsey (2 season)
- Assistant coaches: Derrick McDowell; Carl Thomas; Chip Wilde
- Home arena: Convocation Center

2006–07 Mid-American Conference men's basketball standings
	Conf.				Overall
Team	W		L	PCT	W		L	PCT
East
Akron	13	–	3	.813	26	–	7	.788
Kent State	12	–	4	.750	21	–	11	.656
Miami (OH) †	10	–	6	.625	18	–	15	.545
Ohio	9	–	7	.563	19	–	13	.594
Buffalo	4	–	12	.250	12	–	19	.387
Bowling Green	3	–	13	.188	13	–	18	.419
West
Toledo	14	–	2	.875	19	–	13	.594
Western Michigan	9	–	7	.563	16	–	16	.500
Central Michigan	7	–	9	.438	13	–	18	.419
Eastern Michigan	6	–	10	.375	13	–	19	.406
Ball State	5	–	11	.313	9	–	22	.290
Northern Illinois	4	–	12	.250	7	–	23	.233
† 2007 MAC tournament winner Rankings from AP Poll

The 2006–07 Eastern Michigan Eagles men's basketball team represented Eastern Michigan University during the 2006–07 NCAA Division I men's basketball season. The Eagles, led by 2nd year head coach Charles E. Ramsey, played their home games at the Eastern Michigan University Convocation Center and were members of the West Division of the Mid-American Conference. They finished the season 13–19, 6–10 in MAC play. They team finished 4th in the MAC West. They were knocked out in the 2nd round of the MAC Tournament by Toledo The team captains were Carlos Medlock, Craig Cashen.

== Roster ==
Number	Name	Position	Height	Weight	Year	Hometown	HS/Previous
0	Nenad Banjanin	Forward	6–7	215	Junior	Belgrade, Serbia	Lon Morris J.C.
1	Devon Dumes	Guard	6–2	180	Freshman	Indianapolis, Indiana	Decatur Central
2	B.J. Ford	Guard	6–1	170	Sophomore	Caledonia, Michigan	East Kentwood
3	Carlos Medlock	Guard	6–0	186	Sophomore	Detroit, Michigan	Murray Wright
4	James Matthews	Center	6–8	210	Junior	Detroit, Michigan	Marquette
5	Nick Freer	Wing	6–6	195	Junior	Stevensville, Michigan	Lakeshore
10	Jarred Axon	Guard	5–11	180	Junior	Jackson, Michigan	Schoolcraft C.C
15	Will Cooper	Wing	6–6	180	Freshman	Detroit, Michigan	Bridgton Academy
21	Craig Cashen	Forward	6–8	210	Senior	Cincinnati, Ohio	St. Xavier
23	Jesse Bunkley	Guard	6–5	208	Junior	Detroit, Michigan	Mott C.C.
25	Justin Dobbins	Forward	6–8	240	Freshman	Cleveland, Ohio	Glenville
31	Zane Gay	Guard	6–5	201	Sophomore	Olivet, Michigan	Olivet
32	Travis Lewis	Guard	6–2	200	Junior	Kalamazoo, Michigan	Loy Norrix
33	Brandon Bowdry	Forward	6–6	229	Freshman	St. Louis, Missouri	Taylor (Mich.) Truman
34	Kyle Dodd	Center	6–11	210	Redshirt Freshman	Rockwood, Ontario	John F. Ross Collegiate and Vocational Institute
44	Chris Knaub	Wing	6–10	225	Senior	South Bend, Indiana	Jacksonville J.C.

== Coaching staff ==
Name	Position	College	Graduating year
Charles Ramsey	Head coach	Eastern Michigan University	1992
Derrick McDowell	Associate Coach	Stetson University	1983
Carl Thomas	Assistant coach	Eastern Michigan University	2000
Chip Wilde	Assistant coach	Western Illinois University	1991
Rich Marion	Director of Basketball Operations	Eastern Michigan	1996

== Schedule ==
Date time, TV	Rank^{#}	Opponent^{#}	Result	Record	High points	High rebounds	High assists	Site (attendance) city, state
November 10, 2006*; 6:00pm		vs. Davidson; John Thompson Challenge	L 77–81	0–1	23 – Medlock	6 – Banjanin	5 – Medlock	Crisler Center (8426); Ann Arbor, Michigan
November 11, 2006*; 2:00pm		vs. Central Conn. State; John Thompson Challenge	W 76–69	1–1	13 – Bunkley, Medlock	8 – Banjanin	4 – Dumes, Medlock	Crisler Center (8762); Ann Arbor, Michigan
November 12, 2006*; 4:0pm		at Michigan; John Thompson Challenge	L 51–80	1–2	14 – Dumes	7 – Bowdry	4 – Bunkley	Crisler Center (8958); Ann Arbor, Michigan
November 18, 2006*; 1:00pm		at No. 16 Marquette	L 62–95	1–3	16 – Dumes	8 – Bowdry	3 – Banjanin	Bradley Center (12978); Milwaukee, Wisconsin
November 29, 2006*; 7:00 pm		at Detroit	L 52–72	1–4	11 – Medlock	4 – Bowdry, Freer	4 – Cashen	Calihan Hall (2120); Detroit, Michigan
December 05, 2006*; 7:00 pm		Oakland	L 55–66	1–5	10 – Bowdry, Bunkley	4 – Bowdry	4 – Medlock	Convocation Center (609); Ypsilanti, Michigan
December 08, 2006*; 5:00 pm		vs. San Diego; Golden Bear Classic	L 76–78	1–6	19 – Bowdry	6 – Medlock	7 – Medlock	Haas Pavilion; Berkeley, California
December 09, 2006*; 8:00 pm		vs. Chicago State; Golden Bear Classic	L 61–72	1–7	23 – Bowdry	10 – Bowdry	5 – Lewis	Haas Pavilion; Berkeley, California
December 21, 2006*; 3:00 pm		Northern Colorado	W 71–61	2–7	20 – Medlock	7 – Bowdry	3 – Axon, Lewis	Convocation Center (348); Ypsilanti, Michigan
December 23, 2006*; 1:00 pm		at Tulsa	L 48–66	2–8	9 – Bowdry	6 – Bowdry	2 – Axon, Medlock	Reynolds Center (5012); Tulsa, Oklahoma
December 28, 2006*; 3:00 pm		Eastern Illinois	W 63–51	3–8	15 – Axon	7 – Bowdry	3 – Axon, Matthews	Convocation Center (569); Ypsilanti, Michigan
December 31, 2006*; 2:00 pm		IPFW	W 62–61	4–8	19 – Bunkley	6 – Matthews	4 – Medlock	Convocation Center (458); Ypsilanti, Michigan
January 03, 2007*; 8:00 pm		North Dakota State	W 74–66	5–8	23 – Medlock	4 – Bowdry, Cashen, Dobbins	4 – Lewis	Convocation Center (407); Ypsilanti, Michigan
January 06, 2007; 3:00 pm		Central Michigan; Michigan MAC Trophy	L 68–74	5–9 (0–1)	15 – Bunkley, Medock	9 – Dobbins	5 – Medlock	Convocation Center (949); Ypsilanti, Michigan
January 09, 2007; 7:00 pm		at Northern Illinois	W 63–62	6–9 (1–1)	15 – Medlock	9 – Knaub	3 – Bunkley, Lewis	Convocation Center (959); Ypsilanti, Michigan
January 13, 2007; 2:00 pm, Comcast Local		at Ball State	W 56–52	7–9 (2–1)	22 – Bunkley	6 – Dobbins, Medlock	3 – Dumes, Medlock	John E. Worthen Arena (4367); Muncie, Indiana
January 16, 2007; 7:00 pm		Toledo	L 56–66	7–10 (2–2)	18 – Medlock	6 – Bowdry, Dobbins	4 – Medlock	Convocation Center (1267); Ypsilanti, Michigan
January 20, 2007; 2:00 pm		at Western Michigan; Michigan MAC Trophy	L 80–84	7–11 (2–3)	21 – Medlock	8 – Dobbins	5 – Medlock	University Arena (4123); Kalamazoo, Michigan
January 24, 2007; 7:00 pm		at Ohio	L 61–67	7–12 (2–4)	19 – Dumes	8 – Bowdry	5 – Medlock	Convocation Center (4256); Athens, Ohio
January 28, 2007; 7:00 pm		Buffalo	W 89–76	8–12 (3–4)	26 – Medlock	6 – Dobbins	4 – Lewis	Convocation Center (1556); Ypsilanti, Michigan
January 31, 2007; 7:00 pm		Akron	L 60–70	8–13 (3–5)	12 – Dumes	5 – Bowdry, Matthews	4 – Axon	Convocation Center (697); Ypsilanti, Michigan
February 03, 2007; 2:00pm		at Kent State; Varsity "K" Hall of Fame Weekend	L 46–82	8–14 (3–6)	13 – Dumes	6 – Bowdry	1 – Freer, Matthews	Memorial Athletic and Convocation Center (3462); Kent, Ohio
February 07, 2007; 7:00 pm		Miami	L 64–74	8–15 (3–7)	14 – Axon	5 – Matthews	3 – Bowdry, Bunkley	Convocation Center (790); Ypsilanti, Michigan
February 10, 2007; 2:00 pm		at Bowling Green	W 65–63	9–15 (4–7)	17 – Axon, Bunkley	6 – Cashen, Matthews	2 – Cashen, Lewis, Matthews	Stroh Center (1410); Bowling Green, Ohio
February 13, 2007; 7:00 pm		at Toledo	L 52–70	9–16 (4–8)	15 – Dumes	9 – Matthews	4 – Axon	Savage Arena (3784); Toledo, Ohio
February 17, 2007*; 4:00 pm		Manhattan; ESPN Bracket Buster	W 65–51	10–16	14 – Bowdry	8 – Bowdry	6 – Lewis	Convocation Center (1481); Ypsilanti, Michigan
February 22, 2007; 7:00pm		Western Michigan; Michigan MAC Trophy	L 61–80	10–17 (4–9)	11 – Bunkley, Lewis	10 – Lewis	3 – Bowdry, Lewis	Convocation Center (969); Ypsilanti, Michigan
February 25, 2007; 2:00pm, Comcast Local		Ball State; Senior Day	W 61–51	11–17 (5–9)	16 – Axon	11 – Lewis	4 – Axon, Lewis	Convocation Center (638); Ypsilanti, Michigan
March 02, 2007; 7:00pm		at Central Michigan; Michigan MAC Trophy	W 87–83 ^{1}	12–17 (6–9)	17 – Bunkley, Dumes	6 – Matthews	6 – Lewis	Daniel P. Rose Center (1112); Mount Pleasant, Michigan
March 04, 2007; 2:00pm		at Northern Illinois	L 69–76	12–18 (6–10)	17 – Dumes	8 – Dobbins	4 – Lewis	Convocation Center (4240); DeKalb, Illinois
March 07, 2007; 1:00pm		vs. Ball State; MAC tournament	W 51–48	13–18	15 – Bunkley	15 – Bowdry	6 – Lewis	Quicken Loans Arena; Cleveland, Ohio
March 08, 2007; 12:00pm		vs. Toledo; MAC Tournament	L 54–62	13–19	16 – Dobbins	9 – Bowdry, Dobbins	5 – Dumes	Quicken Loans Arena; Cleveland, Ohio
*Non-conference game. ^{#}Rankings from AP Poll. (#) Tournament seedings in parentheses.

== Awards ==
MAC All-Freshman team

- Brandon Bowdry

MAC Player of the Week

- Nov. 10, 2006 Carlos Medlock
- Jan. 01, 2007 Jesse Bunkley
- Nov. 13, 2007 Carlos Medlock

E Club Hall of Fame Inductee

- Al Jagutis

Thompson Challenge All Tournament Team

- Carlos Medlock

Golden Bear Classic All Tournament Team

- Brandon Bowdry
