= 2006–07 Ohio Bobcats men's basketball team =

American college basketball season

2006–07 Ohio Bobcats men's basketball
- Conference: Mid-American Conference
- East Division
- Record: 19–13 (9–7 MAC)
- Head coach: Tim O'Shea (6th season)
- Assistant coaches: John Rhodes; Kevin Kuwik; Brian Townsend
- Home arena: Convocation Center

2006–07 Mid-American Conference men's basketball standings
	Conf.				Overall
Team	W		L	PCT	W		L	PCT
East
Akron	13	–	3	.813	26	–	7	.788
Kent State	12	–	4	.750	21	–	11	.656
Miami (OH) †	10	–	6	.625	18	–	15	.545
Ohio	9	–	7	.563	19	–	13	.594
Buffalo	4	–	12	.250	12	–	19	.387
Bowling Green	3	–	13	.188	13	–	18	.419
West
Toledo	14	–	2	.875	19	–	13	.594
Western Michigan	9	–	7	.563	16	–	16	.500
Central Michigan	7	–	9	.438	13	–	18	.419
Eastern Michigan	6	–	10	.375	13	–	19	.406
Ball State	5	–	11	.313	9	–	22	.290
Northern Illinois	4	–	12	.250	7	–	23	.233
† 2007 MAC tournament winner Rankings from AP Poll

The 2006–07 Ohio Bobcats men's basketball team represented Ohio University in the college basketball season of 2006–07. The team was coached by Tim O'Shea and played their home games at the Convocation Center. They finished the season 19–13 and 9–7 in MAC play to finish fourth in the MAC East.

== Roster ==
2006–07 Ohio Bobcats men's basketball team
Players
Coaches

Pos.	#	Name	Height	Weight	Year	Hometown
F	1	Sonny Troutman	6 ft 6 in (1.98 m)	210 lb (95 kg)	Sr	Indianapolis, Indiana
G	3	Steve Hartings	6 ft 1 in (1.85 m)	180 lb (82 kg)	Sr	Vandalia, Ohio
G	4	Bubba Walther	6 ft 4 in (1.93 m)	170 lb (77 kg)	Jr	Cincinnati, Ohio
F/C	5	Leon Williams	6 ft 8 in (2.03 m)	255 lb (116 kg)	Jr	Baltimore, Maryland
G	10	Whitney Davis	6 ft 4 in (1.93 m)	198 lb (90 kg)	Sr	Ann Arbor, Michigan
F/C	12	Kenneth van Kempen	6 ft 9 in (2.06 m)	250 lb (113 kg)	Fr	Weert, Netherlands
G	14	Stephan King	6 ft 3 in (1.91 m)	190 lb (86 kg)	Sr	Richfield, Minnesota
F	20	Robert Mercer	6 ft 5 in (1.96 m)	195 lb (88 kg)	Fr	Cleveland, Ohio
F	25	Justin Orr	6 ft 6 in (1.98 m)	205 lb (93 kg)	Jr	Cincinnati, Ohio
F	32	Matt Annen	6 ft 7 in (2.01 m)	225 lb (102 kg)	Sr	Elk River, Minnesota
F	33	Jerome Tillman	6 ft 6 in (1.98 m)	240 lb (109 kg)	So	Beavercreek, Ohio
F	44	Asown Sayles	6 ft 5 in (1.96 m)	210 lb (95 kg)	Fr	McKeesport, Pennsylvania

Head coach

Tim O'Shea

Assistant coach(es)

John Rhodes
Kevin Kuwik
Brian Townsend

Legend

- (C) Team captain
- (S) Suspended
- (I) Ineligible
- (W) Walk-on
- Injured
- Current redshirt

== Coaching staff ==
Name	Position	College	Graduating year
Tim O'Shea	Head coach	Boston College	1984
John Rhodes	Associate Head Coach	Ohio University	1988
Kevin Kuwik	Assistant coach	Notre Dame	1996
Brian Townsend	Assistant coach	Michigan	1991
Doug Dewey	Graduate Assistant	Ohio University	2006

== Preseason ==
The preseason poll was announced by the league office on October 24, 2006. Ohio was picked second in the MAC East.

=== Preseason men's basketball poll ===
(First place votes in parentheses)

==== East Division ====
1. Akron
2. Ohio
3. Kent State
4. Miami
5. Buffalo
6. Bowling Green

==== West Division ====
1. Toledo
2. Northern Illinois
3. Western Michigan
4. Ball State
5. Eastern Michigan
6. Central Michigan

=== Preseason All-MAC ===
Preseason All-MAC teams
Team	Player	Position	Year
Preseason All-MAC East	Leon Williams	F	Jr.

== Schedule and results ==
Date time, TV	Rank^{#}	Opponent^{#}	Result	Record	Site (attendance) city, state
Regular Season
11/11/06*; 2:00 pm		Marist	W 83–66	1–0	Convocation Center (2,707); Athens, OH
11/19/06*; 3:00 pm		Yale	W 73–65	2–0	Convocation Center (3,582); Athens, OH
11/28/06*; 7:00 pm		at Samford	L 66–80	2–1	Pete Hanna Center (1,879); Homewood, AL
12/2/06*; 7:00 pm		Marshall	W 84–78 ^{OT}	3–1	Convocation Center (2,693); Athens, OH
12/26/06*; 7:00 pm		at St. Bonaventure	W 77–72	4–1	Reilly Center (3,018); St. Bonaventure, NY
12/8/06*; 7:07 pm		at Louisville; Marques Maybin Classic	L 71–74	4–2	Freedom Hall (17,791); Louisville, KY
12/9/06; 4:30 pm		vs. Bellarmine; Marques Maybin Classic	W 91–74	5–2	Freedom Hall (17,811); Louisville, KY
12/10/06*; 8:00 pm		vs. St. Joseph's; Marques Maybin Classic	W 79–72	6–2	Freedom Hall (16,788); Louisville, KY
12/21/06*; 9:30 pm		vs. Davidson; Sleep America Holiday Classic	L 74–83	6–3	Wells Fargo Arena (4,331); Tempe, AZ
12/22/06*; 4:30 pm		vs. North Carolina A&T; Sleep America Holiday Classic	W 95–83	7–3	Wells Fargo Arena (4,133); Tempe, AZ
12/27/06*; 7:00 pm		Rhode Island	W 97–69	8–3	Convocation Center (3,379); Athens, OH
12/30/06*; 6:00 pm		vs. Cincinnati	W 79–66	9–3	Quicken Loans Arena (3,437); Cleveland, OH
1/3/07*; 7:00 pm		at Marshall	L 60–70	9–4	Cam Henderson Center (2,693); Huntington, WV
MAC regular season
1/6/07; 7:00 pm		Akron	W 77–72	10–4 (1–0)	Convocation Center (5,229); Athens, OH
1/11/07; 2:00 pm		Bowling Green	W 67–49	11–4 (2–0)	Convocation Center (4,081); Athens, OH
1/14/07; 2:00 pm		at Kent State	L 65–67 ^{OT}	11–5 (2–1)	Memorial Athletic and Convocation Center (4,263); Kent, OH
1/18/07; 7:00 pm		Buffalo	W 67–51	12–5 (3–1)	Convocation Center (4,028); Athens, OH
1/21/07; 1:00 pm		at Miami (OH)	L 69–72 ^{OT}	12–6 (3–2)	Millett Hall (2,185); Oxford, OH
1/24/07; 7:00 pm		Eastern Michigan	W 67–61	13–6 (4–2)	Convocation Center (4,256); Athens, OH
1/28/07; 7:00 pm		at Ball State	L 57–69	13–7 (4–3)	John E. Worthen Arena (5,003); Muncie, IN
1/31/07; 7:00 pm		Toledo	W 91–80	14–7 (5–3)	Convocation Center (5,189); Athens, OH
2/3/07; 7:00 pm		at Central Michigan	W 74–73	15–7 (6–3)	McGuirk Arena (3,419); Mount Pleasant, MI
2/9/08; 2:30 pm		at Western Michigan	W 78–73 ^{OT}	16–7 (7–3)	University Arena (2,987); Kalamazoo, MI
2/10/07; 3:00 pm		Northern Illinois	L 71–81	16–8 (7–4)	Convocation Center (6,318); Athens, OH
2/13/07; 7:07 pm		at Akron	L 48–79	16–9 (7–5)	James A. Rhodes Arena (4,138); Akron, Ohio
2/17/07*; 10:05 pm		at New Mexico State	L 72–77	16–10 (7–5)	Pan American Center (9,100); Las Cruces, NM
2/21/07; 7:00 pm		at Bowling Green	W 88–63	17–10 (8–5)	Stroh Center (1,483); Bowling Green, OH
2/24/07; 3:00 pm		Kent State	L 71–73	17–11 (8–6)	Convocation Center (7,069); Athens, OH
3/1/07; 7:00 pm		Miami (OH)	W 52–25	18–11 (9–6)	Convocation Center (5,494); Athens, OH
3/9/07; 2:00 pm		at Buffalo	L 65–84	18–12 (9–7)	Alumni Arena (3,571); Buffalo, NY
MAC tournament
3/7/07; 3:35 pm		vs. Bowling Green; First Round	W 69–59	19–12	Quicken Loans Arena (5,248); Cleveland, OH
3/8/07; 2:25 pm		vs. Miami (OH); First Round	L 51–70	19–13	Quicken Loans Arena (4,983); Cleveland, OH
*Non-conference game. ^{#}Rankings from AP Poll. (#) Tournament seedings in parentheses. All times are in Eastern.

== Statistics ==
=== Team statistics ===
Final 2006–07 statistics

Record	Ohio	OPP
Scoring	2331	2250
Scoring Average	72.84	70.31
Field goals – Att	782–1723	818–1822
3-pt. Field goals – Att	199–585	–
Free throws – Att	568–785	–
Rebounds	1093	1071
Assists	422	
Turnovers	449	
Steals	260	
Blocked Shots	65	

=== Player statistics ===
			Minutes		Scoring		Total FGs			3-point FGs			Free-Throws			Rebounds								
Player	GP	GS	Tot	Avg	Pts	Avg	FG	FGA	Pct	3FG	3FA	Pct	FT	FTA	Pct	Off	Def	Tot	Avg	A	PF	TO	Stl	Blk
Jerome Tillman	32	30	1037	32.4	467	14.6	162	289	0.561	23	51	0.451	120	176	0.682	97	164	261	8.2	42	93	57	31	15
Leon Williams	32	32	927	29	461	14.4	162	278	0.583	0	0	0	137	201	0.682	114	169	283	8.8	29	121	61	33	24
Whitney Davis	32	32	1151	36	390	12.2	132	297	0.444	34	93	0.366	92	133	0.692	33	68	101	3.2	72	43	71	40	4
Sonny Troutman	32	32	1008	31.5	386	12.1	121	325	0.372	26	122	0.213	118	143	0.825	26	81	107	3.3	142	70	116	82	4
Bubba Walther	29	24	916	31.6	360	12.4	113	286	0.395	74	198	0.374	60	69	0.87	4	72	76	2.6	62	42	57	43	10
Stephen King	32	4	491	15.3	121	3.8	38	104	0.365	31	87	0.356	14	18	0.778	4	24	28	0.9	24	27	12	9	1
Kenneth van Kempen	32	0	493	15.4	98	3.1	41	100	0.41	6	17	0.353	10	22	0.455	28	68	96	3	6	80	36	8	5
Antonio Chatman	15	4	341	22.7	42	2.8	11	34	0.324	5	13	0.385	15	16	0.938	6	26	32	2.1	44	17	29	13	1
Asown Sayles	14	0	28	2	3	0.2	1	5	0.2	0	1	0	1	3	0.333	1	2	3	0.2	0	3	5	0	0
Matt Annen	26	2	69	2.7	2	0.1	1	4	0.25	0	2	0	0	2	0	2	8	10	0.4	0	10	1	1	1
Johnnie Jackson	4	0	36	9	1	0.3	0	1	0	0	1	0	1	2	0.5	1	4	5	1.3	1	7	2	0	0
Steve Hartings	2	0	2	1	0	0	0	0	0	0	0	0	0	0	0	0	0	1	0.5	0	0	0	0	0
Total	32	-	0	-	2331	72.8	782	1723	0.454	199	585	0.340	568	785	0.724	360	733	1093	34.2	422	513	449	260	65
Opponents	32	-	0	-	2250	70.3	818	1822	0.449			-			-			1071	33.5					

Legend
GP	Games played	GS	Games started	Avg	Average per game
FG	Field-goals made	FGA	Field-goal attempts	Off	Offensive rebounds
Def	Defensive rebounds	A	Assists	TO	Turnovers
Blk	Blocks	Stl	Steals	High	Team high

== Awards and honors ==
=== All-MAC Awards ===
Postseason All-MAC teams
Team	Player	Position	Year
All-MAC First team	Leon Williams	F	Jr.
All-MAC Second team	Jerome Tillman	F	So.
All-MAC Honorable Mention	Sonny Troutman	G	Sr.
