= Tim O'Shea =

American basketball player and coach

Biographical details
- Born: January 13, 1962 (age 64); Woodbury, New Jersey, U.S.

Playing career
- 1980–1984: Boston College

Coaching career (HC unless noted)
- 1984–1985: Rhode Island (assistant)
- 1985–1986: Boston College (assistant)
- 1986–1988: Yale (assistant)
- 1988–1997: Rhode Island (assistant)
- 1997–2001: Boston College (assistant)
- 2001–2008: Ohio
- 2008–2018: Bryant
- 2020–present: Naval Academy Prep

Head coaching record
- Overall: 216–305
- Tournaments: 0–1 (NCAA Division I); 0–1 (CBI)

Accomplishments and honors

Championships
- MAC tournament (2005)

Awards
- NEC Coach of the Year (2013)

Tim O'Shea (born January 13, 1962) is an American college basketball coach, most recently the head coach of the men's basketball team at Bryant University. He was previously the head coach at Ohio University.

== Playing career ==
Born in Woodbury, New Jersey, O'Shea earned All-America accolades while playing at Wayland High School in Wayland, Massachusetts. He played college basketball at Boston College from 1980 to 1984 under Gary Williams. During his time at BC, O'Shea and the Eagles won two Big East regular-season titles. O'Shea also earned four postseason tournament berths during his career, with BC advancing twice to the NCAA tournament Sweet Sixteen and once to the Elite Eight.

O'Shea earned a bachelor's degree in communications with a minor in English from Boston College in 1984, then added a master's degree in counseling/psychology from BC two years later.

== Coaching career ==
Upon graduation from Boston College, O'Shea became a graduate assistant at the University of Rhode Island (URI) for the 1984–85 season before returning to The Heights as a grad assistant at BC from 1985 to 1986. After a two-year stint as an assistant at Yale, O'Shea returned to URI, joining Al Skinner's staff, where he stayed for nine seasons. While on the Rams' staff, O'Shea was a part of two NCAA tournament bids along with two NIT bids. He is credited with recruiting Cuttino Mobley among others to URI. O'Shea followed Skinner and returned to his alma mater once again after Skinner accepted the Boston College job in 1997. He remained on the staff until 2001, when he landed his first head coaching gig at Ohio, just a year after the Eagles won both the Big East regular season and tournament titles, finishing with a 27–5 record and earning three-seed in the NCAA tournament.

=== Ohio ===
In his first season in charge of the Bobcats, O'Shea guided the team to a 17–11 record, including wins over DePaul and North Carolina. A year later, O'Shea and Ohio posted a 14–16 record, with the season highlighted by a victory over Virginia.

Following the 2002–03 season, forward Brandon Hunter became the first Bobcat selected in the NBA draft since 1995 when the Boston Celtics selected him in the second round. A year later, after losing Hunter, sixth man Sonny Johnson and three-point shooter Steve Esterkamp, the 2003–04 Bobcats slipped to a 10–20 record, but bounced back in 2004–05, posting a 21–11 record en route to the NCAA tournament.

The 2004–05 Bobcats captured significant non-conference victories against San Francisco, Butler and Detroit, then won 11 of their last 15 contests down the stretch. O'Shea won the MAC tournament but their run ended in the first round of the NCAA tournament against Florida, falling 67–62, overcoming a 20-point second-half deficit, but coming up just short.

With expectations high in 2005–06, O'Shea and Ohio compiled 19 victories before falling to eventual league champion Kent State in the MAC tournament semifinals. The Bobcats registered victories at Marist, Rhode Island and Toledo, against Akron and Samford at home, and took 18th-ranked Kentucky to the wire in Cincinnati, Ohio.

From 2003 until O'Shea's departure in 2008, Ohio would have five straight winning seasons with at least 19 wins each season. O'Shea was 120–95 in eight seasons in charge.

=== Bryant ===
O'Shea returned to his New England roots when he signed an eight-year contract to take over the head coaching duties at Bryant as the school transitioned to a full Division I member of the Northeast Conference. The Bulldogs broke through in the Bulldogs' first season of full Division I eligibility in 2012–13, winning 19 games and hosting a game in the College Basketball Invitational.

Bryant went 16–15 the following season with an NEC semifinal appearance, but the Bulldogs failed to make the NEC tournament in two of O'Shea's final three seasons at the helm, including an injury-plagued 2017–18 campaign in which Bryant's four leading scorers made a total of four starts together, all in the month of November.

On February 12, 2018, O'Shea announced his retirement from Bryant, effectively at the end of the 2017–18 season.

== Head coaching record ==
Record table
Season	Team	Overall	Conference	Standing	Postseason
Ohio Bobcats (Mid-American Conference) (2001–2008)
2001–02	Ohio	17–11	11–7	3rd (East)	
2002–03	Ohio	14–16	8–10	5th (East)	
2003–04	Ohio	10–20	7–11	5th (East)	
2004–05	Ohio	21–11	11–7	T–2nd (East)	NCAA Division I first round
2005–06	Ohio	19–11	11–8	4th (East)	
2006–07	Ohio	19–13	9–7	4th (East)	
2007–08	Ohio	20–13	9–7	3rd (East)	
Ohio:		120–95 (.558)	66–57 (.537)		
Bryant Bulldogs (NCAA Division I independent) (2008–2009)
2008–09	Bryant	8–21			
Bryant Bulldogs (Northeast Conference) (2009–2018)
2009–10	Bryant	1–29	1–17	12th	
2010–11	Bryant	9–21	7–11	8th	
2011–12	Bryant	2–28	1–17	12th	
2012–13	Bryant	19–11	12–6	T–2nd	CBI first round
2013–14	Bryant	18–14	10–6	3rd	
2014–15	Bryant	16–15	12–6	T–2nd	
2015–16	Bryant	8–23	5–13	9th	
2016–17	Bryant	12–20	9–9	T–5th	
2017–18	Bryant	3–28	2–16	10th	
Bryant:		96–210 (.314)	59–101 (.369)		
Total:		216–305 (.415)			
National champion Postseason invitational champion Conference regular season champion Conference regular season and conference tournament champion Division regular season champion Division regular season and conference tournament champion Conference tournament champion
