= 2007 MAC men's basketball tournament =

- Classification: Division I
- Season: 2006–07
- Teams: 12
- Site: Quicken Loans Arena; Cleveland, Ohio
- Champions: Miami (OH) (4th title)
- Winning coach: Charlie Coles (3rd title)
- MVP: Tim Pollitz (Miami (OH))
- Top scorer: Tim Pollitz (Miami (OH)) (66 points)
- Television: Comcast Local, FSN Ohio, ESPN2
- MAC men's basketball tournaments

2006–07 Mid-American Conference men's basketball standings
	Conf.				Overall
Team	W		L	PCT	W		L	PCT
East
Akron	13	–	3	.813	26	–	7	.788
Kent State	12	–	4	.750	21	–	11	.656
Miami (OH) †	10	–	6	.625	18	–	15	.545
Ohio	9	–	7	.563	19	–	13	.594
Buffalo	4	–	12	.250	12	–	19	.387
Bowling Green	3	–	13	.188	13	–	18	.419
West
Toledo	14	–	2	.875	19	–	13	.594
Western Michigan	9	–	7	.563	16	–	16	.500
Central Michigan	7	–	9	.438	13	–	18	.419
Eastern Michigan	6	–	10	.375	13	–	19	.406
Ball State	5	–	11	.313	9	–	22	.290
Northern Illinois	4	–	12	.250	7	–	23	.233
† 2007 MAC tournament winner Rankings from AP Poll

The 2007 Mid-American Conference men's basketball tournament was the post-season men's basketball tournament for the Mid-American Conference (MAC) 2006–2007 season. It was won by No. 4 seed Miami University over No. 2 University of Akron 53–52 after a controversial finish. Miami guard Doug Penno banked in a three-point field goal with no time left on the clock to give Miami an apparent one-point victory. However, after a ten-minute delay, officials put 0.6 seconds back on the clock because the game clock did not start properly when Miami rebounded an Akron missed free throw. Because of the win in the conference tournament final, Miami was awarded the MAC's automatic berth into the 2007 NCAA Men's Division I Basketball Tournament.

The tournament took place from March 7–10 at Quicken Loans Arena in Cleveland. This was the first year that the entire tournament was held in Cleveland. In previous tournaments the first-round games were played at the higher seeds' home courts. Comcast Local and FSN Ohio televised the Quarterfinals and Semifinals while ESPN2 broadcast the tournament championship.

== All-tournament team ==
- Romeo Travis, Akron
- Jeremiah Wood, Akron
- Giordan Watson, Central Michigan
- Tim Pollitz, Miami (Tournament MVP)
- Michael Bramos, Miami

== Format ==
Each of the 12 men's basketball teams in the MAC received a berth in the conference tournament. Teams were seeded by conference record with the following tie-breakers:

- Head-to-head competition
- Winning percentage vs. ranked conference teams (top to bottom, regardless of division, vs. common opponents regardless of the number of times played)
- Coin flip

The top four seeds received byes into the Quarterfinals. The winners of each division were awarded the No. 1 and No. 2 seeds. The team with the best record of the two received the No. 1 seed.

== Seeding ==
The following were the seeds for the conference tournament, along with conference record.

1. Toledo, 14–2
2. Akron, 13–3
3. Kent State, 12–4
4. Miami, 10–6
5. Ohio, 9–7 *
6. Western Michigan, 9–7
7. Central Michigan, 7–9
8. Eastern Michigan, 6–10
9. Ball State, 5–11
10. Buffalo, 4–12 **
11. Northern Illinois, 4–12
12. Bowling Green, 3–13

* Received No. 5 seed based on 78–73 head-to-head victory over Western Michigan on February 6.
** Received No. 10 seed based on 80–74 head-to-head victory over Northern Illinois on February 3.

== Bracket ==
First round Wednesday, March 7
8	Eastern Michigan	51
9	Ball State	48
5	Ohio	69
12	Bowling Green	59
7	Central Michigan	80
10	Buffalo	74
6	Western Michigan	67
11	Northern Illinois	62

Quarterfinals; Thursday, March 8
1	Toledo	62
8	Eastern Michigan	54
4	Miami (OH)	70
5	Ohio	51
2	Akron	82
7	Central Michigan	53
3	Kent State	75
6	Western Michigan	66

Semifinals; Friday, March 9
1	Toledo	53
4	Miami (OH)	58
2	Akron	61
3	Kent State	54

Final; Saturday, March 10
4	Miami (OH)	53
2	Akron	52

== See also ==
- Mid-American Conference men's basketball tournament
