= 2003–04 Eastern Michigan Eagles men's basketball team =

American college basketball season

2003–04 Eastern Michigan Eagles men's basketball
- Conference: Mid-American Conference
- West Division
- Record: 13–15 (7–11 MAC)
- Head coach: Jim Boone (4 season)
- Home arena: Convocation Center

2003–04 Mid-American Conference men's basketball standings
	Conf.				Overall
Team	W		L	PCT	W		L	PCT
East
Kent State	13	–	5	.722	22	–	9	.710
Miami (OH)	12	–	6	.667	18	–	11	.621
Buffalo	11	–	7	.611	17	–	12	.586
Marshall	8	–	10	.444	12	–	17	.414
Akron	7	–	11	.389	13	–	15	.464
Ohio	7	–	11	.389	10	–	20	.333
West
Western Michigan†	15	–	3	.833	26	–	5	.839
Toledo	12	–	6	.667	20	–	11	.645
Ball State	10	–	8	.556	14	–	15	.483
Bowling Green	8	–	10	.444	14	–	17	.452
Eastern Michigan	7	–	11	.389	13	–	15	.464
Northern Illinois	5	–	13	.278	10	–	20	.333
Central Michigan	2	–	16	.111	6	–	24	.200
† 2004 MAC tournament winner Rankings from AP Poll

The 2003–04 Eastern Michigan Eagles men's basketball team represented Eastern Michigan University during the 2003–04 NCAA Division I men's basketball season. The Eagles, led by fourth year head coach Jim Boone. The Eagles played their home games at the Eastern Michigan University Convocation Center and were members of the West Division of the Mid-American Conference. They finished the season 13–15, 7–11 in MAC play. They finished fifth in the MAC West. They were knocked out in the first round of the MAC Tournament by Marshall.

== Roster ==
The team captains were Markus Austin, Michael Ross.

Number	Name	Position	Height	Weight	Year	Home Town
1	JaQuan Hart	Guard/Forward	6–6	170	Sophomore	Flint, MI
2	James Douglas	Guard	6–3	190	Freshman	Harper Woods, MI
3	Michael Ross	Guard	5–10	180	Junior	Beckley, WV
13	Danny McElhinny	Guard	6–0	165	Sophomore	Hermitage, PA
14	Ricky Cottrill	Forward	6–3	195	Senior	Poca, WV
21	Craig Cashen	Center	6–8	210	Freshman	Cincinnati, OH
22	James "Boo" Jackson	Forward	6–9	220	Junior	Pittsburgh, PA
25	Markus Austin	Forward	6–6	215	Junior	White Plains, NY
34	Erik Shontee	Forward	6–6	210	Freshman	Dayton, OH
42	John Bowler	Forward	6–8	210	Sophomore	Chicago, IL
50	Emmanuel Amatosero	Center	6–9	220	Freshman	Delta, Nigeria
52	Dan Redder	Forward	6–10	260	Freshman	Zeeland, MI

== Schedule ==
Date time, TV	Opponent	Result	Record	Site (attendance) city, state
Regular Season
11/22/2003*; 5:00 pm	vs. Yale; Pepsi-Marist Classic	L 60–75	0–1	McCann Field House (655); Poughkeepsie, NY
11/23/2003*; 3:00 pm	at Marist; Pepsi-Marist Classic	W 82–62	1–1	McCann Field House (1642); Poughkeepsie, NY
11/25/2003*; 8:00 pm	Concordia (MI)	W 86–45	2–1	Convocation Center (1717); Ypsilanti, MI
11/20/2003*; 7:05 pm	at Nebraska	L 59–67	2–2	Bob Devaney Sports Center (6376); Lincoln, NE
12/02/2003; 7:00 pm	Kent State	L 74–83	2–3 (0–1)	Convocation Center (4123); Ypsilanti, MI
12/06/2003*; 7:05 pm	at Illinois State	L 69–80	2–4 (0–1)	Redbird Arena (6909); Normal, IL
12/09/2003*; 7:05 pm	Albion	W 81–60	3–4 (0–1)	Convocation Center (2847); Ypsilanti, MI
12/23/2003*; 7:00 pm	Northern Colorado	W 82–55	4–4 (0–1)	Convocation Center (1679); Ypsilanti, MI
01/03/2004; 3:30 pm	at Bowling Green	L 68–84	4–5 (0–2)	Stroh Center (2488); Bowling Green, OH
01/07/2004*; 8:00 pm	Navy	W 99–52	5–5 (0–2)	Convocation Center (1892); Ypsilanti, MI
01/10/2004; 2:00 pm	at Central Michigan	W 71–68	6–5 (1–2)	McGuirk Arena (2772); Mount Pleasant, MI
01/14/2004; 7:05 pm	at Northern Illinois	L 65–86	6–6 (1–3)	Convocation Center (2720); DeKalb, IL
01/17/2004; 7:00 pm	Western Michigan	L 82–86	6–7 (1–4)	Convocation Center (2942); Ypsilanti, MI
01/19/2004; 8:05 pm	Toledo	L 63–85	6–8 (1–5)	Convocation Center (2322); Ypsilanti, MI
01/24/2004; 2:00 pm	at Miami (OH)	L 46–74	6–9 (1–6)	Millett Hall (3672); Oxford, OH
01/28/2004; 7:05 pm	Central Michigan	W 80–63	7–9 (2–6)	Convocation Center (2429); Ypsilanti, MI
01/31/2004; 4:30 pm	at Western Michigan	L 55–75	7–10 (2–7)	University Arena (5128); Kalamazoo, MI
02/04/2004; 7:00 pm	at Buffalo	W 77–66	8–10 (3–7)	Alumni Arena (1823); Amherst, NY
02/07/2004; 2:05 pm, MAC TV	Akron	W 77–55	9–10 (4–7)	Convocation Center (3547); Ypsilanti, MI
02/11/2004; 7:00 pm	at Marshall	L 68–75	9–11 (4–8)	Cam Henderson Center (4253); Huntington, WV
02/14/2004; 7:15 pm	at Toledo	W 84–79	10–11 (5–8)	Savage Arena (5816); Toledo, OH
02/18/2004; 7:00 pm	Buffalo	L 64–83	10–12 (5–9)	Convocation Center (2101); Ypsilanti, MI
02/21/2004*; 5:30 pm	Cleveland State; Bracket Buster	W 87–66	11–12 (5–9)	CSU Convocation Center (1971); Cleveland, OH
02/25/2004; 7:05 pm	Ohio	W 75–64	12–12 (6–9)	Convocation Center (2023); Ypsilanti, MI
02/28/2004; 7:05 pm	Northern Illinois	L 61–67	12–13 (6–10)	Convocation Center (3119); Ypsilanti, MI
03/03/2004; 7:00 pm	at Ball State	L 47–75	12–14 (6–11)	John E. Worthen Arena (5199); Muncie, IN
03/06/2004; 7:05 pm	Bowling Green	W 78–75 ^{1}	13–15 (7–11)	Convocation Center (3114); Ypsilanti, MI
2004 MAC men's basketball tournament
03/08/2004; 7:00 pm	at Marshall; 1st Round	L 59–78	13–16 (7–11)	Cam Henderson Center (1520); Huntington, WV
*Non-conference game. ^{#}Rankings from AP Poll. (#) Tournament seedings in parentheses. All times are in Eastern Time.

== Awards ==
MAC Player of the Week

- Dec. 28, 2003 John Bowler

Preseason 1st Team All-MAC West Division

- John Bowler

E-Club Hall of Fame Inductees

- Earl Dixon

== Season Highlights ==
=== 12/02 vs Kent State ===
- EMU celebrated Grant Long Night with the retiring of his jersey number #43

=== 12/23 vs Northern Colorado ===
- JaQuan Hart sets a career high in points with 20.
- John Bowler sets career high in points with 18.
- The victory marks EMU head coach Jim Boone's 300th career victory.

=== 01/03 at Bowling Green ===
- EMU's John Bowler posted a career best 26 points.

=== 01/17 vs Western Michigan ===
- John Bowler posts fifth double-double of season.

=== 02/07 vs Akron ===
- Mid-American Conference Game of the Week televised by Fox Sports Net.
- Career high 25 points for Senior James Jackson.
