= 2004–05 Eastern Michigan Eagles men's basketball team =

American college basketball season

2004–05 Eastern Michigan Eagles men's basketball
- Conference: Mid-American Conference
- West Division
- Record: 12–18 (5–13 MAC)
- Head coach: Jim Boone (5th season)
- Home arena: Convocation Center

2004–05 Mid-American Conference men's basketball standings
	Conf.				Overall
Team	W		L	PCT	W		L	PCT
East
Miami (OH)	12	–	6	.667	19	–	11	.633
Buffalo	11	–	7	.611	23	–	10	.697
Ohio †	11	–	7	.611	21	–	11	.656
Akron	11	–	7	.611	19	–	10	.655
Kent State	11	–	7	.611	20	–	13	.606
Marshall	3	–	15	.167	6	–	22	.214
West
Western Michigan	11	–	7	.611	20	–	13	.606
Toledo	11	–	7	.611	16	–	13	.552
Bowling Green	10	–	8	.556	18	–	11	.621
Ball State	10	–	8	.556	15	–	13	.536
Northern Illinois	7	–	11	.389	11	–	17	.393
Eastern Michigan	5	–	13	.278	12	–	18	.400
Central Michigan	4	–	14	.222	10	–	18	.357
† 2005 MAC tournament winner Rankings from AP Poll

The 2004–05 Eastern Michigan Eagles men's basketball team represented Eastern Michigan University during the 2004–05 NCAA Division I men's basketball season. The Eagles, led by fifth year head coach Jim Boone, who was fired at the end of the season. The Eagles played their home games at the Eastern Michigan University Convocation Center and were members of the West Division of the Mid-American Conference. They finished the season 12–18, 5–13 in MAC play. They finished sixth in the MAC West. They were knocked out in the first round of the MAC Tournament by Akron.

== Roster ==
The team captains were John Bowler, Michael Ross.

Number	Name	Position	Height	Year
3	Michael Ross	Guard	5–9	Senior
4	James Matthews	Center	6–8	Sophomore
5	Nick Freer	Forward	6–6	Freshman
11	Rico Harris	Guard	6–2	Freshman
12	Eric Williams	Guard	6–3	Sophomore
13	Danny McElhinny	Guard	6–0	Junior
21	Craig Cashen	Forward	6–8	Sophomore
22	James Jackson	Senior	6–9	Freshman
23	Darryl Garrett	Freshman	6–3	Guard
25	Markus Austin	Senior	6–6	Forward
33	Derek VanSolkema	Guard	6–1	Sophomore
42	John Bowler	Forward	6–8	Junior
52	Dan Redder	Center	6–10	Sophomore

== Schedule ==
Date time, TV	Opponent	Result	Record	Site (attendance) city, state
Regular season
11/20/2004*; 6:30 pm	vs. Austin Peay; Paradise Jam	W 73–59	1–0	Sports and Fitness Center (1737); Saint Thomas, U.S. Virgin Islands
11/21/2004*; 6:30 pm	vs. Saint Louis; Paradise Jam	W 61–58	2–0	Sports and Fitness Center (2019); Saint Thomas, U.S. Virgin Islands
11/22/2004*; 9:08 pm, FSN Detroit	vs. Arkansas; Paradise Jam Championship	L 64–82	2–1	Sports and Fitness Center (3014); Saint Thomas, U.S. Virgin Islands
11/30/2004; 7:05 pm	Marshall	W 90–88	3–1 (1–0)	Convocation Center (3162); Ypsilanti, MI
12/07/2004*; 7:05 pm	Rochester	W 89–29	4–1 (1–0)	Convocation Center (3014); Ypsilanti, MI
12/11/2004*; 7:05 pm	Canisius	W 86–72	5–1 (1–0)	Convocation Center (3391); Ypsilanti, MI
12/18/2004*; 2:00 pm	North Dakota State; Throwback Game	W 60–58	6–1 (1–0)	Bowen Field House (3243); Ypsilanti, MI
12/20/2004*; 7:06 pm	at Detroit	L 83–88	6–2 (1–0)	Calihan Hall (3840); Detroit, MI
12/23/2004*; 7:05 pm	Cleveland State	W 89–76	7–2 (1–0)	Convocation Center (1836); Ypsilanti, MI
12/30/2004*; 7:05 pm	at Montana	L 68–80	7–3 (1–0)	Dahlberg Arena (2903); Missoula, MT
01/02/2005; 4:05 pm	Toledo	W 75–70	8–3 (2–0)	Convocation Center (2782); Ypsilanti, MI
01/05/2005; 7:00 pm	at Kent State	L 64–67	8–4 (2–1)	Memorial Athletic and Convocation Center (2364); Kent, OH
01/09/2005; 1:00 pm	at Central Michigan	W 86–82	9–4 (3–1)	McGuirk Arena (2058); Mount Pleasant, MI
01/12/2005; 7:5 pm	Bowling Green	L 63–79	9–5 (3–2)	Convocation Center (2478); Ypsilanti, MI
01/15/2005; 7:00 pm	at Akron	L 68–76	9–6 (3–3)	James A. Rhodes Arena (2830); Akron, OH
01/19/2005; 7:05 pm	Miami (OH)	L 73–83	9–7 (3–4)	Convocation Center (1936); Ypsilanti, MI
01/22/2005; 7:05 pm	at Northern Illinois	L 74–87	9–8 (3–5)	Convocation Center (1701); DeKalb, IL
01/29/2005; 2:05 pm	Buffalo	L 68–80	9–9 (3–6)	Convocation Center (2893); Ypsilanti, MI
01/31/2005; 7:00 pm	at Ball State	L 86–96	9–10 (3–7)	John E. Worthen Arena (6022); Muncie, IN
02/03/2005; 8:00 pm	at Western Michigan	L 71–82	9–11 (3–8)	University Arena (3428); Kalamazoo, MI
02/06/2005*; 2:05 pm	IPFW	W 74–54	10–11 (3–8)	Convocation Center (1539); Ypsilanti, MI
02/09/2005; 7:00 pm	at Marshall	L 75–81	10–12 (3–9)	Cam Henderson Center (3689); Huntington, WV
02/12/2005; 4:07 pm, Comcast Local	Central Michigan; Cram the Convo	L 79–82	11–12 (4–9)	Convocation Center (5423); Ypsilanti, MI
02/16/2005; 7:05 pm	Northern Illinois	W 79–63	12–12 (5–9)	Convocation Center (1042); Ypsilanti, MI
02/19/2005*; 2:00 pm	at Youngstown State; Bracket Buster	L 60–74	12–13 (5–9)	Beeghly Physical Education Center (2122); Youngstown, OH
02/23/2005; 7:00 pm	at Ohio	L 65–68	12–14 (5–10)	Convocation Center (3471); Athens, OH
02/26/2005; 7:05 pm	Western Michigan	L 63–73	12–15 (5–11)	Convocation Center (3029); Ypsilanti, MI
03/02/2005; 7:07 pm, Comcast Local	Ball State; Senior Day	L 56–71	12–16 (5–12)	Convocation Center (1589); Ypsilanti, MI
03/04/2005; 2:30 pm	at Toledo	L 70–78 ^{OT}	12–17 (5–13)	Savage Arena (4429); Toledo, OH
2005 MAC tournament
03/07/2005; 7:00 pm	at Akron; 1st Round	L 66–78	12–18 (5–13)	James A. Rhodes Arena (1520); Akron, OH
*Non-conference game. ^{#}Rankings from AP Poll. (#) Tournament seedings in parentheses. All times are in Eastern Time.

== Awards ==
MAC Honorable Mention

- John Bowler

Preseason 1st Team All-MAC West Division

- John Bowler

E-Club Hall of Fame Inductees

- Ben Braun
- Harold Simons

MAC Individual Records

- Michael Ross- Free Throw Percentage (.854)

== Season Highlights ==
11/22 vs Arkansas

- Paradise Jam Basketball Tournament Finals

01/01 at Central Michigan

- EMU attempted the most free throws in school history.
