= 2005 MAC men's basketball tournament =

- Classification: Division I
- Season: 2004–05
- Teams: 13
- Site: Gund Arena; Cleveland, Ohio
- Champions: Ohio (4th title)
- Winning coach: Tim O'Shea (1st title)
- MVP: Leon Williams (Ohio)
- MAC men's basketball tournaments

2004–05 Mid-American Conference men's basketball standings
	Conf.				Overall
Team	W		L	PCT	W		L	PCT
East
Miami (OH)	12	–	6	.667	19	–	11	.633
Buffalo	11	–	7	.611	23	–	10	.697
Ohio †	11	–	7	.611	21	–	11	.656
Akron	11	–	7	.611	19	–	10	.655
Kent State	11	–	7	.611	20	–	13	.606
Marshall	3	–	15	.167	6	–	22	.214
West
Western Michigan	11	–	7	.611	20	–	13	.606
Toledo	11	–	7	.611	16	–	13	.552
Bowling Green	10	–	8	.556	18	–	11	.621
Ball State	10	–	8	.556	15	–	13	.536
Northern Illinois	7	–	11	.389	11	–	17	.393
Eastern Michigan	5	–	13	.278	12	–	18	.400
Central Michigan	4	–	14	.222	10	–	18	.357
† 2005 MAC tournament winner Rankings from AP Poll

The 2005 MAC men's basketball tournament, a part of the 2004-05 NCAA Division I men's basketball season, took place from March 7–12 at Gund Arena in Cleveland. Its winner received the Mid-American Conference's automatic bid to the 2005 NCAA tournament. It is a single-elimination tournament with four rounds and the three highest seeds received byes in the first round. All MAC teams were invited to participate. Miami, the MAC regular season winner, received the number one seed in the tournament. Fourth-seeded Ohio beat Miami in the semi-finals and defeated second-seeded Buffalo in overtime in the final. In the NCAA Ohio lost in the first round to Florida. Leon Williams of Ohio was named the tournament MVP.

== Tournament ==
=== Seeds ===
1. Miami
2. Toledo
3. Western Michigan
4. Ohio
5. Kent State
6. Akron
7. Buffalo
8. Bowling Green
9. Ball State
10. Northern Illinois
11. Eastern Michigan
12. Central Michigan
13. Marshall

=== Bracket ===
First round March 7, 2005
8	Bowling Green	75
9	Ball State	73
4	Ohio	72
13	Marshall	66
5	Kent State	91
12	Central Michigan	60
7	Buffalo	73
10	Northern Illinois	66
6	Akron	78
11	Eastern Michigan	66

Quarterfinals; March 10, 2005
1	Miami (OH)	85
8	Bowling Green	65
4	Ohio	62
5	Kent State	55
2	Toledo	72
7	Buffalo	85
3	Western Michigan	66
6	Akron	60^{OT}

Semifinals; March 11, 2005
1	Miami	56
4	Ohio	63
7	Buffalo	75
3	Western Michigan	68

Championship; March 12, 2005
4	Ohio	80
7	Buffalo	79^{OT}

=== First round ===
Team	1st	2nd	Final
Ohio	33	39	72
Marshall	28	38	66

Team	1st	2nd	Final
Kent State	46	45	91
Central Michigan	26	34	60

Team	1st	2nd	Final
Akron	46	32	78
Eastern Michigan	33	33	66

Team	1st	2nd	Final
Buffalo	34	39	73
Northern Illinois	30	36	66

Team	1st	2nd	Final
Bowling Green	30	43	75
Ball State	45	30	73

=== Quarterfinals ===
Team	1st	2nd	Final
Buffalo	45	40	85
Toledo	37	35	72

Team	1st	2nd	OT	Final
Western Michigan	31	27	8	66
Akron	37	21	2	60

Team	1st	2nd	Final
Miami	39	46	85
Bowling Green	29	36	65

Team	1st	2nd	Final
Ohio	23	39	62
Kent State	20	35	55

=== Semifinals ===
Team	1st	2nd	Final
Ohio	26	37	63
Miami	24	32	56

Team	1st	2nd	Final
Buffalo	29	46	75
Western Michigan	37	31	68

=== Finals ===
Team	1st	2nd	OT	Final
Ohio	33	37	10	80
Buffalo	43	27	9	79
