= 2006–07 Miami RedHawks men's basketball team =

American college basketball season

2006–07 Miami RedHawks men's basketball

MAC Tournament champion

NCAA tournament, First round
- Conference: Mid-American Conference
- East
- Record: 18–15 (10–6 MAC)
- Head coach: Charlie Coles (11th season)
- Home arena: Millett Hall

2006–07 Mid-American Conference men's basketball standings
	Conf.				Overall
Team	W		L	PCT	W		L	PCT
East
Akron	13	–	3	.813	26	–	7	.788
Kent State	12	–	4	.750	21	–	11	.656
Miami (OH) †	10	–	6	.625	18	–	15	.545
Ohio	9	–	7	.563	19	–	13	.594
Buffalo	4	–	12	.250	12	–	19	.387
Bowling Green	3	–	13	.188	13	–	18	.419
West
Toledo	14	–	2	.875	19	–	13	.594
Western Michigan	9	–	7	.563	16	–	16	.500
Central Michigan	7	–	9	.438	13	–	18	.419
Eastern Michigan	6	–	10	.375	13	–	19	.406
Ball State	5	–	11	.313	9	–	22	.290
Northern Illinois	4	–	12	.250	7	–	23	.233
† 2007 MAC tournament winner Rankings from AP Poll

The 2006–07 Miami RedHawks men's basketball team represent Miami University in the 2006–07 NCAA Division I men's basketball season. The RedHawks, led by 11th-year head coach Charlie Coles, played their home games at Millett Hall in Oxford, Ohio as members of the Mid-American Conference. The team finished third in the MAC East regular season standings. Playing as the 4 seed in the MAC tournament, Miami defeated Ohio, Toledo, and Akron to earn the conference's automatic bid to the NCAA tournament. As the No. 14 seed in the Midwest region, the RedHawks fell in a close game to No. 3 seed Oregon, 58–56, to finish 18–15 (10–6 MAC).

== Roster ==
2006–07 Miami RedHawks men's basketball team
Players
Coaches

Pos.	#	Name	Height	Weight	Year	Hometown
F	24	Michael Bramos	6 ft 5 in (1.96 m)	225 lb (102 kg)	So	Harper Woods, Michigan
F	31	Nathan Peavy	6 ft 8 in (2.03 m)	227 lb (103 kg)	Sr	Dayton, Ohio
F	50	Tim Pollitz	6 ft 5 in (1.96 m)	230 lb (104 kg)	Jr	Ottawa, Ohio

Head coach

- Charlie Coles (Miami (OH))

Assistant coach(es)

Legend

- (C) Team captain
- (S) Suspended
- (I) Ineligible
- (W) Walk-on
- Injured
- Current redshirt

== Schedule and results ==
Date time, TV	Rank^{#}	Opponent^{#}	Result	Record	Site (attendance) city, state
Regular season
Nov 11, 2006*		Wright State	L 56–57	0–1	Millett Hall; Oxford, Ohio
Nov 15, 2006*		at No. 22 Kentucky	L 46–57	0–2	Rupp Arena; Lexington, Kentucky
Nov 17, 2006*		Florida A&M	W 52–33	1–2	Millett Hall; Oxford, Ohio
Nov 21, 2006*		Illinois-Chicago	W 72–61	2–2	Millett Hall; Oxford, Ohio
Nov 24, 2006*		vs. Illinois; Chicago Invitational Challenge	L 49–51	2–3	Sears Centre; Hoffman Estates, Illinois
Nov 25, 2006*		vs. Rutgers; Chicago Invitational Challenge	W 57–44	3–3	Sears Centre; Hoffman Estates, Illinois
Nov 29, 2006*		at Xavier	L 53–68	3–4	Cintas Center; Cincinnati, Ohio
Dec 5, 2006*		at Illinois State	L 40–64	3–5	Redbird Arena; Normal, Illinois
Dec 7, 2006*		Michigan	L 56–62	3–6	
Dec 10, 2006*		Oakland	W 72–46	4–6	
Dec 20, 2006*		at Dayton	L 54–56	4–7	UD Arena; Dayton, Ohio
Dec 27, 2006*		at Cincinnati	L 52–60	4–8	Fifth Third Arena; Cincinnati, Ohio
Jan 7, 2007		Kent State	W 65–63	5–8 (1–0)	Millett Hall; Oxford, Ohio
Jan 11, 2007		at Akron	L 52–54	5–9 (1–1)	James A. Rhodes Arena; Akron, Ohio
Jan 14, 2007		at Buffalo	L 51–68	5–10 (1–2)	Buffalo, New York
Jan 17, 2007		Bowling Green State	W 66–60	6–10 (2–2)	Millett Hall; Oxford, Ohio
Jan 21, 2007		Ohio	W 72–69 ^{OT}	7–10 (3–2)	
Jan 24, 2007		at Central Michigan	W 72–52	8–10 (4–2)	Mount Pleasant, Michigan
Jan 27, 2007		at Toledo	L 56–61	8–11 (4–3)	Toledo, Ohio
Jan 30, 2007		Northern Illinois	W 62–59	9–11 (5–3)	
MAC tournament
Mar 8, 2007*		vs. Ohio; Quarterfinals	W 70–51	16–14	Quicken Loans Arena; Cleveland, Ohio
Mar 9, 2007*		vs. Toledo; Semifinals	W 58–53	17–14	Quicken Loans Arena; Cleveland, Ohio
Mar 10, 2007*		vs. Akron; Championship game	W 53–52	18–14	Quicken Loans Arena; Cleveland, Ohio
NCAA tournament
Mar 16, 2007*	(14 MW)	vs. (3 MW) No. 10 Oregon; First Round	L 56–58	18–15	Spokane Arena; Spokane, Washington
*Non-conference game. ^{#}Rankings from AP poll. (#) Tournament seedings in parentheses. MW=Midwest. All times are in Eastern Time.
