= 2003–04 Western Michigan Broncos men's basketball team =

American college basketball season

2003–04 Western Michigan Broncos men's basketball

MAC West Division champions MAC regular season champions MAC tournament champions

NCAA tournament, round of 64
- Conference: Mid-American Conference
- West Division
- Record: 26–5 (15–3 MAC)
- Head coach: Steve Hawkins (1st season)
- Assistant coaches: Clayton Bates (4th season); Larry Farmer; James Holland
- Home arena: University Arena

2003–04 Mid-American Conference men's basketball standings
| | Conf. | | | | Overall |
| Team | W | | L | PCT | W | | L | PCT |
|---|---|---|---|---|---|---|---|---|
East
| Kent State | 13 | – | 5 | .722 | 22 | – | 9 | .710 |
| Miami (OH) | 12 | – | 6 | .667 | 18 | – | 11 | .621 |
| Buffalo | 11 | – | 7 | .611 | 17 | – | 12 | .586 |
| Marshall | 8 | – | 10 | .444 | 12 | – | 17 | .414 |
| Akron | 7 | – | 11 | .389 | 13 | – | 15 | .464 |
| Ohio | 7 | – | 11 | .389 | 10 | – | 20 | .333 |
West
| Western Michigan† | 15 | – | 3 | .833 | 26 | – | 5 | .839 |
| Toledo | 12 | – | 6 | .667 | 20 | – | 11 | .645 |
| Ball State | 10 | – | 8 | .556 | 14 | – | 15 | .483 |
| Bowling Green | 8 | – | 10 | .444 | 14 | – | 17 | .452 |
| Eastern Michigan | 7 | – | 11 | .389 | 13 | – | 15 | .464 |
| Northern Illinois | 5 | – | 13 | .278 | 10 | – | 20 | .333 |
| Central Michigan | 2 | – | 16 | .111 | 6 | – | 24 | .200 |
† 2004 MAC tournament winner Rankings from AP Poll

The 2003–04 Western Michigan Broncos men's basketball team represented Western Michigan University (WMU) during the 2003–04 NCAA Division I men's basketball season. The Broncos were Mid-American Conference (MAC) overall and West Division co-champions with Toledo, received the No. 1 seed in the conference tournament and defeated Toledo in the conference finals to receive the MAC's automatic berth into the 2014 NCAA Division I men's basketball tournament. WMU is led by 11th year head coach Steve Hawkins and play their home games at University Arena in Kalamazoo, Michigan.

WMU was given a No. 11 seed in the NCAA tournament and lost to No. 6 seeded Vanderbilt in the opening round, 71–59.

== Roster ==
2003–04 Western Michigan Broncos men's basketball team
| Players | Coaches |
|---|---|
| Pos. / # / Name / Height / Weight / Year / Hometown; F / 4 / Mike Williams / 6 ft 8 in (2.03 m) / 190 lb (86 kg) / Sr / Detroit, Michigan | Head coach: Steve Hawkins; Assistant coach(es): Clayton Bates; Larry Farmer; James Holland; Legend: (C) Team captain; (S) Suspended; (I) Ineligible; (W) Walk-on; Injured; Current redshirt |

== Schedule and results ==
| Date time, TV | Rank^{#} | Opponent^{#} | Result | Record | Site (attendance) city, state |
Regular season
| Nov 21, 2003* | | USC | W 83–65 | 1–0 | University Arena; Kalamazoo, Michigan |
| Nov 24, 2003* | | at Detroit | L 43–64 | 1–1 | Calihan Hall; Detroit, Michigan |
| Dec 6, 2003 | | Miami (OH) | W 61–38 | 2–1 (1–0) | University Arena; Kalamazoo, Michigan |
| Dec 13, 2003* | | Fordham | W 88–67 | 3–1 | University Arena; Kalamazoo, Michigan |
| Dec 15, 2003* | | vs. UAB | W 69–62 | 4–1 | Mitchell Center; Mobile, Alabama |
| Dec 20, 2003* | | at Loyola–Chicago | W 79–61 | 5–1 | Joseph J. Gentile Center; Chicago, Illinois |
| Dec 29, 2003* | | vs. Winthrop | W 76–71 | 6–1 | Wells Fargo Arena; Tempe, Arizona |
| Dec 30, 2003* | | at Arizona State | W 81–76 | 7–1 | Wells Fargo Arena; Tempe, Arizona |
| Jan 3, 2004 | | at Akron | W 83–75 | 8–1 (2–0) | James A. Rhodes Arena; Akron, Ohio |
| Jan 10, 2004 | | at Buffalo | W 84–54 | 9–1 (3–0) | Alumni Arena; Buffalo, New York |
| Jan 12, 2004 | | Marshall | W 88–65 | 10–1 (4–0) | University Arena; Kalamazoo, Michigan |
| Jan 14, 2004* | | Purdue-Fort Wayne | W 77–48 | 11–1 | University Arena; Kalamazoo, Michigan |
| Mar 6, 2004 | | Northern Illinois | W 93–61 | 23–4 (15–3) | University Arena; Kalamazoo, Michigan |
MAC tournament
| Mar 11, 2004* | | vs. Marshall; Quarterfinals | W 96–62 | 24–4 | Gund Arena; Cleveland, Ohio |
| Mar 12, 2004* | | vs. Toledo; Semifinals | W 87–77 | 25–4 | Gund Arena; Cleveland, Ohio |
| Mar 13, 2004* | | vs. Kent State; Championship game | W 77–66 | 26–4 | Gund Arena; Cleveland, Ohio |
NCAA tournament
| Mar 19, 2004* | (11 W) | vs. (6 W) Vanderbilt; First round | L 58–71 | 26–5 | The Pepsi Center; Denver, Colorado |
*Non-conference game. ^{#}Rankings from AP Poll. Rankings in parentheses indicate tournament seeds. (#) Tournament seedings in parentheses. W=West. All times are in Eastern Time.
