= 2004–05 Ohio Bobcats men's basketball team =

American college basketball season

2004–05 Ohio Bobcats men's basketball

MAC Tournament Champions

NCAA tournament, first round
- Conference: Mid-American Conference
- East Division
- Record: 21–11 (11–7 MAC)
- Head coach: Tim O'Shea (4th season)
- Assistant coaches: John Rhodes; Adam Demong; Brian Townsend; Kevin Kuwik
- Home arena: Convocation Center

2004–05 Mid-American Conference men's basketball standings
| | Conf. | | | | Overall |
| Team | W | | L | PCT | W | | L | PCT |
|---|---|---|---|---|---|---|---|---|
East
| Miami (OH) | 12 | – | 6 | .667 | 19 | – | 11 | .633 |
| Buffalo | 11 | – | 7 | .611 | 23 | – | 10 | .697 |
| Ohio † | 11 | – | 7 | .611 | 21 | – | 11 | .656 |
| Akron | 11 | – | 7 | .611 | 19 | – | 10 | .655 |
| Kent State | 11 | – | 7 | .611 | 20 | – | 13 | .606 |
| Marshall | 3 | – | 15 | .167 | 6 | – | 22 | .214 |
West
| Western Michigan | 11 | – | 7 | .611 | 20 | – | 13 | .606 |
| Toledo | 11 | – | 7 | .611 | 16 | – | 13 | .552 |
| Bowling Green | 10 | – | 8 | .556 | 18 | – | 11 | .621 |
| Ball State | 10 | – | 8 | .556 | 15 | – | 13 | .536 |
| Northern Illinois | 7 | – | 11 | .389 | 11 | – | 17 | .393 |
| Eastern Michigan | 5 | – | 13 | .278 | 12 | – | 18 | .400 |
| Central Michigan | 4 | – | 14 | .222 | 10 | – | 18 | .357 |
† 2005 MAC tournament winner Rankings from AP Poll

The 2004–05 Ohio Bobcats men's basketball team represented Ohio University in the college basketball season of 2004–05. The team was coached by Tim O'Shea and played their home games at the Convocation Center. They finished the season 21–11 and 11–7 in MAC play to finish in a five way tie for second place and one game behind champion Miami. As the four-seed in the MAC tournament they beat Miami in the semi-finals and defeated Buffalo in overtime in the final. Leon Williams of Ohio was named the tournament MVP. They represented the MAC in the NCAA tournament. There they lost in the first round to Florida.

== Roster ==
2004–05 Ohio Bobcats men's basketball team
Players
Coaches

| Pos. | # | Name | Height | Weight | Year | Hometown |
|---|---|---|---|---|---|---|
| F | 32 | Matt Annen | 6 ft 6 in (1.98 m) | 225 lb (102 kg) | So | Elk River, Minnesota |
| G/F | 15 | James Bridgewater | 6 ft 4 in (1.93 m) | 190 lb (86 kg) | Sr | Ann Arbor, Michigan |
| G | 10 | Whitney Davis | 6 ft 3 in (1.91 m) | 188 lb (85 kg) | So | Ann Arbor, Michigan |
| G | 3 | Jeremy Fears | 6 ft 3 in (1.91 m) | 185 lb (84 kg) | Fr | Joliet, Illinois |
| G | 21 | Diamond Gladney | 6 ft 0 in (1.83 m) | 160 lb (73 kg) | Sr | St. Louis, Missouri |
| G | 00 | Mychal Green | 6 ft 4 in (1.93 m) | 195 lb (88 kg) | Jr | Columbus, Ohio |
| F | 23 | Jeff Halbert | 6 ft 5 in (1.96 m) | 205 lb (93 kg) | Jr | White Bear Lake, Minnesota |
| F | 4 | Terren Halbert | 6 ft 6 in (1.98 m) | 231 lb (105 kg) | Sr | Lexington, Kentucky |
| G | 14 | Stephen King | 6 ft 3 in (1.91 m) | 191 lb (87 kg) | So | Richfield, Minnesota |
| F | 44 | Cliff McGowen | 6 ft 9 in (2.06 m) | 226 lb (103 kg) | Jr | Westerville, Ohio |
| C | 33 | Clay McGowen | 6 ft 10 in (2.08 m) | 230 lb (104 kg) | Sr | Westerville, Ohio |
| F | 1 | Sonny Troutman | 6 ft 5 in (1.96 m) | 210 lb (95 kg) | Jr | Indianapolis, Indiana |
| F | 5 | Leon Williams | 6 ft 8 in (2.03 m) | 245 lb (111 kg) | So | Baltimore, Maryland |

Head coach

Tim O'Shea

Assistant coach(es)

John Rhodes
Brian Townsend
Adam Demong

Legend

- (C) Team captain
- (S) Suspended
- (I) Ineligible
- (W) Walk-on
- Injured
- Current redshirt

== Coaching staff ==
| Name | Position | College | Graduating year |
| Tim O'Shea | Head coach | Boston College | 1984 |
| John Rhodes | Associate Head Coach | Ohio University | 1988 |
| Brian Townsend | Assistant coach | Michigan | 1991 |
| Adam DeMong | Assistant coach | Boston College | 2003 |

== Preseason ==
The preseason poll was announced by the league office on October 21, 2004.

=== Preseason men's basketball poll ===
Buffalo was picked by the media to win the East. Toledo was picked to win the West.

== Schedule and results ==
| Date time, TV | Rank^{#} | Opponent^{#} | Result | Record | Site (attendance) city, state |
Regular Season
| 11/29/04*; 7:00 pm | | San Francisco | W 81–66 | 1–0 | Convocation Center (1,879); Athens, OH |
| 12/2/04*; 7:00 pm | | Butler | W 64–58 | 2–0 | Convocation Center (2,033); Athens, OH |
| 12/4/05*; 7:00 pm | | Navy | W 90–55 | 3–0 | Convocation Center (1,974); Athens, OH |
| 12/7/04*; 7:00 pm | | at St. Francis (PA) | L 74–83 | 3–1 | DeGol Arena (1,103); Loretto, PA |
| 12/11/04*; 1:00 pm | | at American | L 55–64 | 3–2 | Bender Arena (1,378); Washington, DC |
| 12/18/04*; 2:00 pm | | Duquesne | W 73–60 | 4–2 | Convocation Center (1,891); Athens, OH |
| 12/27/04*; 6:00 pm | | vs. Binghamton; FIU Holiday Tournament | W 67–63 | 5–2 | U.S. Century Arena (1,498); Miami, FL |
| 12/28/04*; 8:00 pm | | vs. Florida International; FIU Holiday Tournament | W 74–73 ^{OT} | 5–3 | U.S. Century Arena (1,406); Miami, FL |
MAC regular season
| 1/2/05; 7:00 pm | | at Akron | L 59–71 | 5–4 (0–1) | James A. Rhodes Arena (3,236); Akron, OH |
| 1/5/05; 7:00 pm | | at Ball State | L 80–81 | 5–5 (0–2) | John E. Worthen Arena (3,668); Muncie, Indiana |
| 1/9/05; 1:00 pm | | Marshall | W 77–68 | 6–5 (1–2) | Convocation Center (3,179); Athens, OH |
| 1/12/05; 8:05 pm | | at Northern Illinois | L 71–74 | 6–6 (1–3) | Convocation Center (2,090); DeKalb, IL |
| 1/15/05; 3:30 pm | | at Kent State | W 80–54 | 7–6 (2–3) | Convocation Center (7,942); Athens, OH |
| 1/19/05; 7:00 pm | | at Central Michigan | W 74–54 | 8–6 (3–3) | McGuirk Arena (2,026); Mount Pleasant, Michigan |
| 1/22/05; 8:00 pm | | at Miami (OH) | L 57–59 | 8–7 (3–4) | Millett Hall (4,411); Oxford, Ohio |
| 1/26/05; 7:00 pm | | Toledo | W 76–68 | 9–7 (4–4) | Convocation Center (3,298); Athens, OH |
| 12/29/05; 3:30 pm | | Bowling Green | W 72–69 | 10–7 (5–4) | Convocation Center (5,379); Athens, OH |
| 2/2/05; 7:00 pm | | at Buffalo | W 92–90 | 11–7 (6–4) | Alumni Arena (3,416); Buffalo, New York |
| 2/5/05; 3:30 pm | | Western Mighigan | W 89–85 | 12–7 (7–4) | Convocation Center (7,192); Athens, OH |
| 2/7/05; 8:00 pm | | at Bowling Green | L 63–78 | 12–8 (7–5) | Anderson Arena (2,051); Bowling Green, Ohio |
| 2/12/05; 4:00 pm | | Miami (OH) | W 61–57 | 13–8 (8–5) | Convocation Center (8,942); Athens, OH |
| 2/16/05; 7:00 pm | | Akron | W 69–49 | 13–9 (8–6) | Convocation Center (3,722); Athens, OH |
| 2/19/05*; 4:05 pm | | at Detroit | W 66–65 | 14–9 (8–6) | Calihan Hall (2,275); Detroit, Michigan |
| 2/23/05; 7:00 pm | | Eastern Michigan | W 68–65 | 15–9 (9–6) | Convocation Center (3,471); Athens, Ohio |
| 2/26/05; 7:00 pm | | at Marshall | W 83–62 | 16–9 (10–6) | Henderson Center (5,949); Huntington, West Virginia |
| 3/2/05; 7:00 pm | | Buffalo | W 90–77 | 17–9 (11–6) | Convocation Center (5,216); Athens, OH |
| 3/5/05; 6:00 pm | | at Kent State | L 65–82 | 17–10 (11–7) | Memorial A & C Center (5,277); Kent, Ohio |
MAC tournament
| 3/7/05; 9:00 pm | | Marshall; First Round | W 72–66 | 18–10 | Convocation Center (5,463); Athens, OH |
| 3/10/05; 9:15 pm | | vs. Kent State; Quarterfinals | W 62–55 | 19–10 | Quicken Loans Arena (6,851); Cleveland, OH |
| 3/11/05; 7:00 pm | | vs. Miami (OH); Semifinals | W 63–56 | 20–10 | Quicken Loans Arena (8,652); Cleveland, OH |
| 3/12/05; 7:00 pm | | vs. Buffalo; Finals | W 80–79 ^{OT} | 21–10 | Quicken Loans Arena (10,927); Cleveland, OH |
NCAA tournament
| 3/18/05; 12:25 pm | | vs. Florida; First Round | L 62–67 | 21–11 | Bridgestone Arena (17,018); Nashville, Tennessee |
*Non-conference game. ^{#}Rankings from AP Poll. (#) Tournament seedings in parentheses. All times are in Eastern.

== Statistics ==
=== Team statistics ===
Final 2004–05 statistics

| Record | Ohio | OPP |
|---|---|---|
| Scoring | 2288 | 2174 |
| Scoring Average | 71.50 | 67.94 |
| Field goals – Att | 773–1675 | 766–1765 |
| 3-pt. Field goals – Att | 182–555 | – |
| Free throws – Att | 560–802 | – |
| Rebounds | 1050 | 1068 |
| Assists | 374 | |
| Turnovers | 423 | |
| Steals | 273 | |
| Blocked Shots | 86 | |

=== Player statistics ===
| | | | Minutes | | Scoring | | Total FGs | | | 3-point FGs | | | Free-Throws | | | Rebounds | | | | | | | | |
| Player | GP | GS | Tot | Avg | Pts | Avg | FG | FGA | Pct | 3FG | 3FA | Pct | FT | FTA | Pct | Off | Def | Tot | Avg | A | PF | TO | Stl | Blk |
|---|---|---|---|---|---|---|---|---|---|---|---|---|---|---|---|---|---|---|---|---|---|---|---|---|
| Mychal Green | 31 | 31 | 1045 | 33.7 | 466 | 15 | 155 | 355 | 0.437 | 69 | 185 | 0.373 | 87 | 117 | 0.744 | 39 | 77 | 116 | 3.7 | 49 | 68 | 57 | 50 | 20 |
| Sonny Troutman | 32 | 32 | 954 | 29.8 | 403 | 12.6 | 132 | 279 | 0.473 | 29 | 96 | 0.302 | 110 | 138 | 0.797 | 39 | 84 | 123 | 3.8 | 100 | 81 | 95 | 72 | 9 |
| Leon Williams | 32 | 32 | 916 | 28.6 | 382 | 11.9 | 145 | 225 | 0.644 | 0 | 0 | 0 | 92 | 161 | 0.571 | 89 | 185 | 274 | 8.6 | 7 | 103 | 51 | 37 | 17 |
| Jeremy Fears | 32 | 27 | 938 | 29.3 | 352 | 11 | 121 | 304 | 0.398 | 21 | 104 | 0.202 | 89 | 123 | 0.724 | 24 | 53 | 77 | 2.4 | 118 | 72 | 106 | 58 | 2 |
| Terren Harbut | 31 | 29 | 740 | 23.9 | 261 | 8.4 | 79 | 183 | 0.432 | 0 | 1 | 0 | 103 | 143 | 0.72 | 50 | 71 | 121 | 3.9 | 28 | 97 | 38 | 9 | 17 |
| Jeff Halbert | 32 | 2 | 751 | 23.5 | 213 | 6.7 | 66 | 170 | 0.388 | 52 | 132 | 0.394 | 29 | 37 | 0.784 | 15 | 84 | 99 | 3.1 | 30 | 33 | 15 | 17 | 3 |
| Whitney Davis | 30 | 0 | 282 | 9.4 | 70 | 2.3 | 20 | 35 | 0.571 | 4 | 10 | 0.4 | 26 | 36 | 0.722 | 9 | 24 | 33 | 1.1 | 11 | 20 | 10 | 9 | 1 |
| Clay McGowen | 32 | 2 | 394 | 12.3 | 58 | 1.8 | 24 | 50 | 0.48 | 2 | 5 | 0.4 | 8 | 19 | 0.421 | 26 | 46 | 72 | 2.3 | 8 | 61 | 21 | 6 | 12 |
| Diamond Gladney | 32 | 5 | 326 | 10.2 | 51 | 1.6 | 19 | 47 | 0.404 | 3 | 14 | 0.214 | 10 | 19 | 0.526 | 2 | 19 | 21 | 0.7 | 21 | 25 | 21 | 12 | 3 |
| James Bridgewater | 13 | 0 | 45 | 3.5 | 11 | 0.8 | 5 | 14 | 0.357 | 1 | 3 | 0.333 | 0 | 0 | 0 | 4 | 0 | 4 | 0.3 | 1 | 2 | 1 | 2 | 2 |
| Stephen King | 5 | 0 | 15 | 3 | 9 | 1.8 | 3 | 8 | 0.375 | 1 | 5 | 0.2 | 2 | 2 | 1 | 0 | 0 | 1 | 0.2 | 1 | 3 | 1 | 1 | 0 |
| Cliff McGowen | 6 | 0 | 15 | 2.5 | 9 | 1.5 | 3 | 4 | 0.75 | 0 | 0 | 0 | 3 | 4 | 0.75 | 3 | 1 | 4 | 0.7 | 0 | 2 | 0 | 0 | 0 |
| Matt Annen | 10 | 0 | 29 | 2.9 | 3 | 0.3 | 1 | 1 | 1 | 0 | 0 | 0 | 1 | 3 | 0.333 | 2 | 4 | 6 | 0.6 | 0 | 4 | 0 | 0 | 0 |
| Total | 32 | - | 6450 | - | 2288 | 71.5 | 773 | 1675 | 0.461 | 182 | 555 | 0.328 | 560 | 802 | 0.698 | 348 | 702 | 1050 | 32.8 | 374 | 571 | 423 | 273 | 86 |
| Opponents | 32 | - | 6450 | - | 2174 | 67.9 | 766 | 1765 | 0.434 | | | - | | | - | | | 1068 | 33.4 | | | | | |

Legend
| GP | Games played | GS | Games started | Avg | Average per game |
| FG | Field-goals made | FGA | Field-goal attempts | Off | Offensive rebounds |
| Def | Defensive rebounds | A | Assists | TO | Turnovers |
| Blk | Blocks | Stl | Steals | High | Team high |

== Awards and honors ==
=== All-MAC Awards ===
Postseason All-MAC teams
| Team | Player | Position | Year |
|---|---|---|---|
| All-MAC Honorable Mention | Leon Williams | F | Fr. |
| All-MAC Freshman team | Jeremy Fears | G | Fr. |
| All-MAC Freshman team | Leon Williams | F | Fr. |
