= 2003–04 Ohio Bobcats men's basketball team =

American college basketball season

2003–04 Ohio Bobcats men's basketball
- Conference: Mid-American Conference
- East Division
- Record: 10–20 (7–11 MAC)
- Head coach: Tim O'Shea (3rd season)
- Assistant coaches: John Rhodes; Kevin Kuwik; Brian Townsend
- Home arena: Convocation Center

2003–04 Mid-American Conference men's basketball standings
	Conf.				Overall
Team	W		L	PCT	W		L	PCT
East
Kent State	13	–	5	.722	22	–	9	.710
Miami (OH)	12	–	6	.667	18	–	11	.621
Buffalo	11	–	7	.611	17	–	12	.586
Marshall	8	–	10	.444	12	–	17	.414
Akron	7	–	11	.389	13	–	15	.464
Ohio	7	–	11	.389	10	–	20	.333
West
Western Michigan†	15	–	3	.833	26	–	5	.839
Toledo	12	–	6	.667	20	–	11	.645
Ball State	10	–	8	.556	14	–	15	.483
Bowling Green	8	–	10	.444	14	–	17	.452
Eastern Michigan	7	–	11	.389	13	–	15	.464
Northern Illinois	5	–	13	.278	10	–	20	.333
Central Michigan	2	–	16	.111	6	–	24	.200
† 2004 MAC tournament winner Rankings from AP Poll

The 2003–04 Ohio Bobcats men's basketball team represented Ohio University in the college basketball season of 2003–04. The team was coached by Tim O'Shea and played their home games at the Convocation Center. They finished the season 10–20 and 7–11 in MAC play to finish last in the MAC East.

== Roster ==
2003–04 Ohio Bobcats men's basketball team
Players
Coaches

Pos.	#	Name	Height	Weight	Year	Hometown
F	4	Terren Halbert	6 ft 6 in (1.98 m)	231 lb (105 kg)	Jr	Lexington, Kentucky
F	1	Sonny Troutman	6 ft 5 in (1.96 m)	210 lb (95 kg)	So	Indianapolis, Indiana
F	23	Jeff Halbert	6 ft 5 in (1.96 m)	205 lb (93 kg)	So	White Bear Lake, Minnesota
G	21	Diamond Gladney	6 ft 0 in (1.83 m)	160 lb (73 kg)	Jr	St. Louis, Missouri
C	33	Clay McGowen	6 ft 10 in (2.08 m)	230 lb (104 kg)	Jr	Westerville, Ohio
G/F	15	James Bridgewater	6 ft 4 in (1.93 m)	190 lb (86 kg)	Jr	Ann Arbor, Michigan
G	10	Whitney Davis	6 ft 3 in (1.91 m)	188 lb (85 kg)	Fr	Ann Arbor, Michigan
F	32	Matt Annen	6 ft 6 in (1.98 m)	225 lb (102 kg)	Fr	Elk River, Minnesota
G	40	Jaivon Harris	6 ft 6 in (1.98 m)	194 lb (88 kg)	Sr	Alliance, Ohio
G	22	Thomas Stephens	6 ft 0 in (1.83 m)	175 lb (79 kg)	Sr	Springfield, OH
F	55	Delvar Barrett	6 ft 8 in (2.03 m)	270 lb (122 kg)	Sr	Detroit, Michigan
C	11	Marin Bota	7 ft 1 in (2.16 m)	274 lb (124 kg)	Sr	Tijarica, Croatia

Head coach

Tim O'Shea

Assistant coach(es)

John Rhodes
Brian Townsend
Kevin Kuwik

Legend

- (C) Team captain
- (S) Suspended
- (I) Ineligible
- (W) Walk-on
- Injured
- Current redshirt

== Preseason ==
The preseason poll was announced by the league office on October 23, 2003.

=== Preseason men's basketball poll ===
Northern Illinois was picked by the media to win the West Division while Miami was tabbed as the favorite in the East.

== Schedule and results ==
Date time, TV	Opponent	Result	Record	Site (attendance) city, state
Regular Season
11/15/03*; 2:00 pm, no	vs. Mercer; Black Coaches Association Classic	L 64–67	0–1	Cintas Center (651); Cincinnati, Ohio
11/15/03*; 2:00 pm, no	vs. Coppin State; Black Coaches Association Classic	W 51–47	1–1	Cintas Center (455); Cincinnati, Ohio
11/17/03*; 2:00 pm, no	vs. UC Irvine; Black Coaches Association Classic	L 60–63	1–2	Cintas Center (408); Cincinnati, Ohio
11/30/03; 2:00 pm, no	Toledo	L 66–72	1–3 (0–1)	Convocation Center (1,702); Athens, Ohio
12/3/03*; 7:00 pm, no	Boston University	L 64–67 ^{2OT}	1–4 (0–1)	Convocation Center (1,431); Athens, Ohio
12/3/03*; 2:00 om, no	Brown	W 71–62	2–4 (0–1)	Convocation Center (1,314); Athens, Ohio
12/9/03*; 7:00 pm, no	DePaul	L 60–63	2–5 (0–1)	Convocation Center (2,043); Athens, Ohio
12/13/03*; 10:00 pm, no	at San Francisco	L 46–53	2–6 (0–1)	War Memorial Gymnasium (2,183); San Francisco, California
12/20/03*; 7:30 pm, no	at Navy	W 63–52	3–6 (0–1)	Alumni Hall (1,118); Annapolis, Maryland
12/27/03*; 8:30 pm, no	vs. No. 19 Wisconsin; Rock-N-Roll Shootout	L 48–71	3–7 (0–1)	Quicken Loans Arena (4,590); Cleveland, Ohio
MAC regular season
1/3/04; 4:05 pm, no	at Northern Illinois	L 63–73	3–8 (0–2)	Convocation Center (2,816); Dekalb, Illinois
1/7/04*; 7:30 pm, no	at Duquesne	L 91–96	3–9 (0–2)	A.J. Palumbo Center (3,407); Pittsburgh, Pennsylvania
1/10/04; 8:00 pm, no	at Kent State	L 71–80	3–10 (0–3)	Memorial A&C Center (5,447); Kent, Ohio
1/14/04; 7:00 pm, no	Buffalo	W 90–76	4–10 (1–3)	Convocation Center (3,465); Athens, Ohio
1/17/o4 2:00 pm, no	Northern Illinois	W 80–59	5–10 (2–3)	Convocation Center (9,109); Athens, Ohio
1/20/04; 7:00 pm, no	at Akron	L 76–84	5–11 (2–4)	James A. Rhodes Arena (2,210); Akron, Ohio
1/24/04; 7:00 pm, no	at Marshall	L 60–74	5–12 (2–5)	Henderson Center (5,861); Huntington, West Virginia
1/28/04; 7:00 pm, no	at Western Michigan	L 73–96	5–13 (2–6)	University Arena (3,142); Kalamazoo, Michigan
1/31/04; 1:00 pm, no	Central Michigan	W 73–61	6–13 (3–6)	Convocation Center (6,896); Athens, Ohio
2/2/04; 6:30 pm, no	Miami (OH)	W 67–64 ^{OT}	7–13 (4–6)	Convocation Center (4,926); Athens, Ohio
2/7/04; 3:30 pm, no	Ball State	W 88–84 ^{OT}	8–13 (5–6)	Convocation Center (5,444); Athens, Ohio
2/11/04; 7:00 pm, no	at Bowling Green	L 71–81	8–14 (5–7)	Anderson Arena (2,146); Bowling Green, Ohio
2/14/04; 2:00 pm, no	Akron	W 83–79	9–14 (6–7)	Convocation Center (6,008); Athens, Ohio
2/18/04; 7:00 pm, no	at Miami (OH)	L 63–64 ^{OT}	9–15 (6–8)	Millet Hall (3,625); Oxford, Ohio
2/21/04*; 2:00 pm, no	at Butler	L 63–64 ^{OT}	9–16 (6–8)	Hinkle Fieldhouse (5,220); Indianapolis, Indiana
2/25/04; 7:00 pm, no	at Eastern Michigan	L 64–75	9–17 (6–9)	Convocation Center (2,023); Ypsilanti, Michigan
2/29/04; 2:00 pm, no	Marshall	L 68–71	9–18 (6–10)	Convocation Center (6,627); Athens, Ohio
3/3/04; 7:00 pm, no	at Buffalo	L 49–77	9–19 (6–11)	Alumni Arena (4,086); Buffalo, New York
3/6/04; 12:00 pm, no	Kent State	W 60–59	10–19 (7–11)	Convocation Center (5,206); Athens, Ohio
MAC tournament
3/8/04; 7:00 pm, no	at Bowling Green; First Round	L 54–56	10–20 (7–11)	Anderson Arena (1,631); Bowling Green, Ohio
*Non-conference game. ^{#}Rankings from AP Poll. (#) Tournament seedings in parentheses. All times are in Eastern.

== Statistics ==
=== Team statistics ===
Final 2003–04 statistics

Record	Ohio	OPP
Scoring	2000	2090
Scoring Average	66.67	69.67
Field goals – Att	643–1602	715–1649
3-pt. Field goals – Att	215–610	–
Free throws – Att	499–692	–
Rebounds	1038	1035
Assists	339	
Turnovers	450	
Steals	183	
Blocked Shots	64	

=== Player statistics ===
			Minutes		Scoring		Total FGs			3-point FGs			Free-Throws			Rebounds								
Player	GP	GS	Tot	Avg	Pts	Avg	FG	FGA	Pct	3FG	3FA	Pct	FT	FTA	Pct	Off	Def	Tot	Avg	A	PF	TO	Stl	Blk
Jaivon Harris	30	8	930	31	452	15.1	137	337	0.407	88	222	0.396	90	114	0.789	23	115	138	4.6	51	95	81	29	3
Thomas Stephens	30	30	930	31	299	10	97	266	0.365	52	147	0.354	53	63	0.841	16	63	79	2.6	97	69	75	26	4
Terren Harbut	30	25	808	26.9	277	9.2	90	204	0.441	2	7	0.286	95	141	0.674	50	68	118	3.9	22	101	45	23	13
Delvar Barrett	30	12	680	22.7	251	8.4	84	179	0.469	0	0	0	83	119	0.697	56	81	137	4.6	20	84	41	9	15
Sonny Troutman	24	16	617	25.7	220	9.2	71	173	0.41	18	57	0.316	60	83	0.723	32	68	100	4.2	59	57	63	47	2
Jeff Halbert	30	19	778	25.9	197	6.6	60	163	0.368	36	106	0.34	41	46	0.891	26	79	105	3.5	41	38	40	10	4
Diamond Gladney	29	2	362	12.5	102	3.5	33	84	0.393	11	35	0.314	25	44	0.568	8	36	44	1.5	26	24	33	11	0
Clay McGowen	30	20	475	15.8	84	2.8	31	68	0.456	0	0	0	22	36	0.611	51	64	115	3.8	11	73	34	8	18
James Bridgewater	27	8	210	7.8	55	2	23	53	0.434	2	3	0.667	7	12	0.583	14	25	39	1.4	6	19	14	14	4
Whitney Davis	27	8	208	7.7	43	1.6	14	53	0.264	6	26	0.231	9	11	0.818	11	13	24	0.9	3	14	14	3	0
Matt Annen	20	2	141	7.1	20	1	3	20	0.15	0	7	0	14	23	0.609	15	12	27	1.4	3	15	5	3	1
Marin Bota	3	0	11	3.7	0	0	0	2	0	0	0	0	0	0	0	0	0	1	0.3	0	2	2	0	0
Total	30	-	6150	-	2000	66.7	643	1602	0.401	215	610	0.352	499	692	0.721	353	685	1038	34.6	339	591	450	183	64
Opponents	33	-	-	-	2090	63.3	715	1649	0.434			-			-			1035	31.4					

Legend
GP	Games played	GS	Games started	Avg	Average per game
FG	Field-goals made	FGA	Field-goal attempts	Off	Offensive rebounds
Def	Defensive rebounds	A	Assists	TO	Turnovers
Blk	Blocks	Stl	Steals	High	Team high

== Awards and honors ==
=== All-MAC Awards ===
Postseason All-MAC teams
Team	Player	Position	Year
All-MAC Honorable Mention	Jaivon Harris	G	Sr.
All-MAC Freshman team	Sonny Troutman	G	Fr.
