= 2004 MAC men's basketball tournament =

- Classification: Division I
- Season: 2003–04
- Teams: 13
- Site: Gund Arena; Cleveland, Ohio
- Champions: Western Michigan (1st title)
- Winning coach: Steve Hawkins (1st title)
- MVP: Mike Williams (Western Michigan)
- MAC men's basketball tournaments

2003–04 Mid-American Conference men's basketball standings
| | Conf. | | | | Overall |
| Team | W | | L | PCT | W | | L | PCT |
|---|---|---|---|---|---|---|---|---|
East
| Kent State | 13 | – | 5 | .722 | 22 | – | 9 | .710 |
| Miami (OH) | 12 | – | 6 | .667 | 18 | – | 11 | .621 |
| Buffalo | 11 | – | 7 | .611 | 17 | – | 12 | .586 |
| Marshall | 8 | – | 10 | .444 | 12 | – | 17 | .414 |
| Akron | 7 | – | 11 | .389 | 13 | – | 15 | .464 |
| Ohio | 7 | – | 11 | .389 | 10 | – | 20 | .333 |
West
| Western Michigan† | 15 | – | 3 | .833 | 26 | – | 5 | .839 |
| Toledo | 12 | – | 6 | .667 | 20 | – | 11 | .645 |
| Ball State | 10 | – | 8 | .556 | 14 | – | 15 | .483 |
| Bowling Green | 8 | – | 10 | .444 | 14 | – | 17 | .452 |
| Eastern Michigan | 7 | – | 11 | .389 | 13 | – | 15 | .464 |
| Northern Illinois | 5 | – | 13 | .278 | 10 | – | 20 | .333 |
| Central Michigan | 2 | – | 16 | .111 | 6 | – | 24 | .200 |
† 2004 MAC tournament winner Rankings from AP Poll

The 2004 MAC men's basketball tournament, a part of the 2003-04 NCAA Division I men's basketball season, took place from March 8–13 at Gund Arena in Cleveland. Its winner received the Mid-American Conference's automatic bid to the 2004 NCAA tournament. It was a single-elimination tournament with four rounds, and the three highest seeds received byes in the first round. All MAC teams were invited to participate. Western Michigan, the MAC regular season winner, received the number one seed in the tournament. Western Michigan defeated Kent State in the final. In the NCAA they lost in the first round to Vanderbilt.

== Tournament ==
=== Seeds ===
1. Western Michigan
2. Kent State
3. Miami
4. Toledo
5. Buffalo
6. Ball State
7. Bowling Green
8. Marshall
9. Eastern Michigan
10. Ohio
11. Akron
12. Northern Illinois
13. Central Michigan

=== Bracket ===
First round March 8, 2004
8 | Marshall | 78
9 | Eastern Michigan | 59
4 | Toledo | 91
13 | Central Michigan | 88
5 | Buffalo | 90
12 | Northern Illinois | 73
7 | Bowling Green | 56
10 | Ohio | 54
6 | Ball State | 76
11 | Akron | 72

Quarterfinals; March 11, 2004
1 | Western Michigan | 96
8 | Marshall | 62
4 | Toledo | 97
5 | Buffalo | 85
2 | Kent State | 79
7 | Bowling Green | 66
3 | Miami (OH) | 72
6 | Ball State | 67

Semifinals; March 12, 2004
1 | Western Michigan | 87
4 | Toledo | 77
2 | Kent State | 66
3 | Miami (OH) | 56

Championship; March 13, 2004
1 | Western Michigan | 77
2 | Kent State | 66

=== First round ===
| Team | 1st | 2nd | Final |
|---|---|---|---|
| Toledo | 51 | 40 | 91 |
| Central Michigan | 51 | 37 | 88 |

| Team | 1st | 2nd | Final |
|---|---|---|---|
| Buffalo | 43 | 47 | 90 |
| Northern Illinois | 38 | 35 | 73 |

| Team | 1st | 2nd | Final |
|---|---|---|---|
| Ball State | 37 | 39 | 76 |
| Akron | 35 | 37 | 72 |

| Team | 1st | 2nd | Final |
|---|---|---|---|
| Bowling Green | 29 | 27 | 56 |
| Ohio | 21 | 33 | 54 |

| Team | 1st | 2nd | Final |
|---|---|---|---|
| Marshall | 46 | 32 | 78 |
| Eastern Michigan | 33 | 26 | 59 |

=== Quarterfinals ===
| Team | 1st | 2nd | Final |
|---|---|---|---|
| Kent State | 31 | 48 | 79 |
| Bowling Green | 31 | 35 | 66 |

| Team | 1st | 2nd | Final |
|---|---|---|---|
| Miami | 34 | 38 | 72 |
| Ball State | 30 | 37 | 67 |

| Team | 1st | 2nd | Final |
|---|---|---|---|
| Western Michigan | 38 | 58 | 96 |
| Marshall | 28 | 34 | 62 |

| Team | 1st | 2nd | Final |
|---|---|---|---|
| Toledo | 47 | 50 | 97 |
| Buffalo | 44 | 41 | 85 |

=== Semi-finals ===
| Team | 1st | 2nd | Final |
|---|---|---|---|
| Western Michigan | 38 | 49 | 87 |
| Toledo | 32 | 45 | 77 |

| Team | 1st | 2nd | Final |
|---|---|---|---|
| Kent State | 26 | 40 | 66 |
| Miami | 26 | 30 | 56 |

=== Finals ===
| Team | 1st | 2nd | Final |
|---|---|---|---|
| Western Michigan | 36 | 41 | 77 |
| Kent State | 37 | 29 | 66 |

== All-Tournament Team ==
Tournament MVP – Mike Williams, Western Michigan

| Player | Team |
|---|---|
| Keith Triplett | Toledo |
| DeAndre Haynes | Kent State |
| John Edwards | Kent State |
| Anthony Kann | Western Michigan |
| Mike Williams | Western Michigan |
