= Mark Adams (basketball, born June 1956) =

American basketball coach and analyst

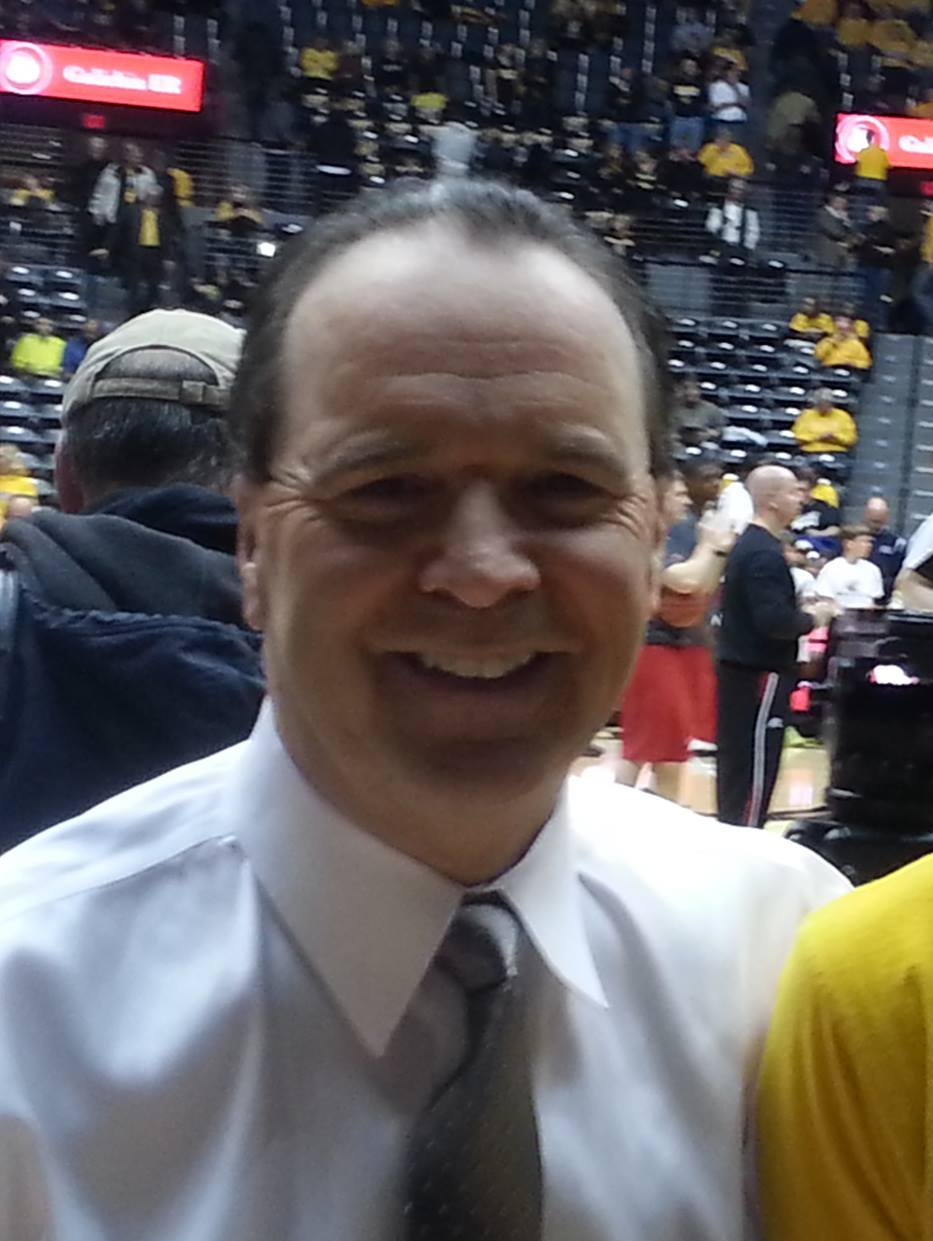
- Adams in 2014

Biographical details
- Born: June 26, 1956 (age 70)
- Education: Cincinnati ('79)

Coaching career (HC unless noted)

Basketball
- 1979–1982: Idaho State (assistant)
- 1982–1985: Rocky Mountain
- 1985–1989: Western Oregon
- 1989–1991: Washington State (assistant)
- 1991–1996: Central Connecticut

Baseball
- 2023–: Miami (OH)–Middletown

Accomplishments and honors

Championships
- Two, NAIA District 2 in 1985 and NAIA Western Division in 1989

Awards
- Northwest Basketball Coach of the Year 1989

Records
- Rocky Mountain College Hall of Fame Induction 2019

Mark Adams (born June 26, 1956) is a college basketball analyst on the ESPN family of networks. Adams was previously head coach of the Central Connecticut Blue Devils from 1991 to 1996. He is also currently the head baseball coach at Miami University Middletown.

Adams was also an assistant coach at Washington State University from 1989 to 1991, head coach at Western Oregon University from 1985 to 1989, head coach Rocky Mountain College from 1982 to 1985, and assistant coach at Idaho State University from 1979 to 1982. Adams was a program rebuilder taking over three programs that won only 32% of games the season before he became head coach. In his final season as a head coach at those same schools his teams won 65% of their games including two championships.
