= Mid-American Conference men's basketball tournament =

Men's basketball championship tournament

- Conference basketball championship
- Sport: Basketball
- Conference: Mid-American Conference
- Number of teams: 8
- Format: Single-elimination tournament
- Current stadium: Rocket Arena
- Current location: Cleveland, Ohio
- Played: 1980–present
- Last contest: 2026
- Current champion: Akron Zips (7th)
- Most championships: Akron Zips, Ball State Cardinals, Kent State Golden Flashes, Ohio Bobcats (7)
- TV partner(s): ESPN2, CBS Sports Network, ESPN+
- Official website: GetSomeMACtion.com – Men's Basketball

Sponsors
- VisitMyrtleBeach.com (2016–2019); FirstEnergy (2009–2015); Kraft Foods (2001–2008)

Host stadiums
- Rocket Arena (2000–present); SeaGate Centre (1996–1999); Savage Arena (1985, 1987–1989, 1995); Battelle Hall (1993–1994); Cobo Arena (1990–1992); Rockford MetroCentre (1984, 1986); Crisler Arena (1980–1982)

Host locations
- Cleveland, Ohio (2000–present); Toledo, Ohio (1985, 1987–1989, 1995–1999); Columbus, Ohio (1993–1994); Detroit, Michigan (1990–1992); Rockford, Illinois (1984, 1986); On-campus sites (1983); Ann Arbor, Michigan (1980–1982)

The Mid-American Conference men's basketball tournament is an NCAA Division I postseason single-elimination tournament. The winner of the tournament receives the Mid-American Conference (MAC) automatic bid to the NCAA Division I men's basketball tournament. As of 2021, the top eight teams in conference play qualify for the tournament. Since 2000, the MAC Tournament has been held at Rocket Arena in Cleveland and is planned to be held there through at least 2030. The finals are broadcast on ESPN2 while the semifinals on CBS Sports Network & the quarterfinals are on ESPN+ for streaming.

The tournament was first played in 1980 and expanded to include all conference members in 2000. The tournament continued to involve all conference members (barring postseason bans due to NCAA sanctions) through the 2020 edition, which was canceled in progress due to the COVID-19 pandemic. In May 2020, as part of a broader suite of changes to MAC postseason tournaments triggered by the pandemic, the MAC announced it would reduce its men's and women's basketball tournaments to 8 teams, with all qualifying teams playing in Cleveland. Additionally, the MAC eliminated its basketball divisions and increased its conference schedule from 18 to 20 games. These changes will remain in place through at least the 2023–24 season. Akron, Ball State, Kent State, and Ohio have the most tournament championships with seven.

== Format ==
Seeding for the tournament is determined by winning percentage in conference play; during the era of MAC divisional play, divisional alignment did not figure into tournament seeding. The following tiebreakers are used:

1. Between two teams: A. Head-to-head competition; B. Division Record (only used if the two teams in question are tied for the Division lead); C. Winning percentage vs. ranked conference teams (top to bottom, regardless of division, vs. common opponents regardless of the number of times played); D. Coin flip

2. For multiple (3 or more) team ties: A. Total won-lost record/winning percentage of games played among the tied teams; B. Two (2)-team tie-breaker procedure goes into effect

=== Historical formats ===
From 2016 through the abbreviated 2020 edition, all 12 conference members participated in the tournament. The top four seeds received byes into the quarterfinals; seeds 5-12 played first-round games at the campus of the higher seed. Winners of the first-round games advanced to face the top four seeds in the quarterfinal round in Cleveland.

From 2012 through 2015, the No. 1 and No. 2 seeds received byes straight to the semifinals, with the No. 3 and No. 4 seeds beginning tournament play in the quarterfinals. Teams seeded 5–12 played an additional two rounds. First round games were played at the home sites of the higher seeds, with the remaining rounds being contested at Rocket Arena, then known as Quicken Loans Arena. Under this format, a team seeded fifth or lower had to win four games in six days, while playing five games in eight days, to win the conference tournament. The division winners were guaranteed to receive a seed not lower than four.

From 2002 through 2011, the format for the conference tournament was similar to the 2016 through 2020 format. Each conference member received a berth in the tournament, with the top four seeds receiving byes into the quarterfinals. Unlike the current format, division winners were guaranteed at least the No. 2 seed. First round games for seeds 5–12 were played at the home sites of the higher seeds, with the remaining rounds being contested at Quicken Loans Arena.

From 1980 through 1988, seven teams qualified for the three-round tournament. The No. 1 seed received a bye into the semifinals. In 1989, an eighth team was added and each of the teams participated in all three rounds. The tournament was expanded in 2000 to four rounds and included all 13 conference teams. The top three teams received byes into the quarterfinals.

== Tournament champions ==
Year	Champion	Score	Runner-up	Tournament MVP	Location	City
1980	Toledo	85–70	Bowling Green	Jim Swaney, Toledo	Crisler Arena (first round on-campus)	Ann Arbor, Michigan
1981	Ball State	79–66	Northern Illinois	Ray McCallum, Ball State	Crisler Arena (first round on-campus)	Ann Arbor, Michigan
1982	Northern Illinois	79–75 ^{(OT)}	Ball State	Allen Rayhorn, Northern Illinois	Crisler Arena (first round on-campus)	Ann Arbor, Michigan
1983	Ohio	59–56	Bowling Green	John Devereaux, Ohio	On-campus (championship at Anderson Arena)	Bowling Green, Ohio
1984	Miami	42–40	Kent State	Chuck Stahl, Miami	MetroCentre	Rockford, Illinois
1985	Ohio	74–64	Miami	Ron Harper, Miami	Centennial Hall	Toledo, Ohio
1986	Ball State	87–79	Miami	Dan Palombizio, Ball State	MetroCentre	Rockford, Illinois
1987	Central Michigan	64–63	Kent State	Dan Majerle, Central Michigan	Centennial Hall	Toledo, Ohio
1988	Eastern Michigan	94–80	Ohio	Grant Long, Eastern Michigan	Centennial Hall	Toledo, Ohio
1989	Ball State	67–65	Kent State	Billy Butts, Ball State	Centennial Hall	Toledo, Ohio
1990	Ball State	78–56	Central Michigan	Billy Butts, Ball State	Cobo Arena	Detroit, Michigan
1991	Eastern Michigan	67–66	Toledo	Marcus Kennedy, Eastern Michigan	Cobo Arena	Detroit, Michigan
1992	Miami	58–57	Ball State	Bill Gillis, Ball State	Cobo Arena	Detroit, Michigan
1993	Ball State	79–64	Western Michigan	Steve Payne, Ball State	Battelle Hall	Columbus, Ohio
1994	Ohio	89–66	Miami	Gary Trent, Ohio	Battelle Hall (first round on-campus)	Columbus, Ohio
1995	Ball State	77–70	Eastern Michigan	Steve Payne, Ball State	Savage Hall (first round on-campus)	Toledo, Ohio
1996	Eastern Michigan	77–63	Toledo	Brian Tolbert, Eastern Michigan	SeaGate Convention Centre (first round on-campus)	Toledo, Ohio
1997	Miami	96–76	Eastern Michigan	Devin Davis, Miami	SeaGate Convention Centre (first round on-campus)	Toledo, Ohio
1998	Eastern Michigan	92–77	Miami	Earl Boykins, Eastern Michigan	SeaGate Convention Centre (first round on-campus)	Toledo, Ohio
1999	Kent State	49–43	Miami	John Whorton, Kent State	SeaGate Convention Centre (first round on-campus)	Toledo, Ohio
2000	Ball State	61–58	Miami	Duane Clemens, Ball State	Gund Arena (first round on-campus)	Cleveland, Ohio
2001	Kent State	67–61	Miami	Trevor Huffman, Kent State	Gund Arena (first round on-campus)	Cleveland, Ohio
2002	Kent State	70–59	Bowling Green	Trevor Huffman, Kent State	Gund Arena (first round on-campus)	Cleveland, Ohio
2003	Central Michigan	77–72	Kent State	Chris Kaman, Central Michigan	Gund Arena (first round on-campus)	Cleveland, Ohio
2004	Western Michigan	77–66	Kent State	Mike Williams, Western Michigan	Gund Arena (first round on-campus)	Cleveland, Ohio
2005	Ohio	80–79 ^{(OT)}	Buffalo	Leon Williams, Ohio	Gund Arena (first round on-campus)	Cleveland, Ohio
2006	Kent State	71–66	Toledo	Kevin Warzynski, Kent State	Quicken Loans Arena (first round on-campus)	Cleveland, Ohio
2007	Miami	53–52	Akron	Tim Pollitz, Miami	Quicken Loans Arena	Cleveland, Ohio
2008	Kent State	74–55	Akron	Haminn Quaintance, Kent State	Quicken Loans Arena	Cleveland, Ohio
2009	Akron	65–53	Buffalo	Nate Linhart, Akron	Quicken Loans Arena	Cleveland, Ohio
2010	Ohio	81–75 ^{(OT)}	Akron	Armon Bassett, Ohio	Quicken Loans Arena (first round on-campus)	Cleveland, Ohio
2011	Akron	66–65 ^{(OT)}	Kent State	Zeke Marshall, Akron	Quicken Loans Arena (first round on-campus)	Cleveland, Ohio
2012	Ohio	64–63	Akron	D. J. Cooper, Ohio	Quicken Loans Arena (first round on-campus)	Cleveland, Ohio
2013	Akron	65–46	Ohio	Demetrius Treadwell, Akron	Quicken Loans Arena (first round on-campus)	Cleveland, Ohio
2014	Western Michigan	98–77	Toledo	David Brown, Western Michigan	Quicken Loans Arena (first round on-campus)	Cleveland, Ohio
2015	Buffalo	89–84	Central Michigan	Xavier Ford, Buffalo	Quicken Loans Arena (first round on-campus)	Cleveland, Ohio
2016	Buffalo	64–61	Akron	Willie Conner, Buffalo	Quicken Loans Arena (first round on-campus)	Cleveland, Ohio
2017	Kent State	70–65	Akron	Jaylin Walker, Kent State	Quicken Loans Arena (first round on-campus)	Cleveland, Ohio
2018	Buffalo	76–66	Toledo	Wes Clark, Buffalo	Quicken Loans Arena (first round on-campus)	Cleveland, Ohio
2019	Buffalo	87–73	Bowling Green	Jeremy Harris, Buffalo	Quicken Loans Arena (first round on-campus)	Cleveland, Ohio
2020	Quarterfinal, Semifinal, and Final rounds cancelled due to the coronavirus pandemic				Rocket Mortgage FieldHouse	Cleveland, Ohio
2021	Ohio	84–69	Buffalo	Jason Preston, Ohio	Rocket Mortgage FieldHouse	Cleveland, Ohio
2022	Akron	75–55	Kent State	Enrique Freeman, Akron	Rocket Mortgage FieldHouse	Cleveland, Ohio
2023	Kent State	93–78	Toledo	Sincere Carry, Kent State	Rocket Mortgage FieldHouse	Cleveland, Ohio
2024	Akron	62–61	Kent State	Enrique Freeman, Akron	Rocket Mortgage FieldHouse	Cleveland, Ohio
2025	Akron	76–74	Miami	Nate Johnson, Akron	Rocket Arena	Cleveland, Ohio
2026	Akron	79–76	Toledo	Tavari Johnson, Akron	Rocket Arena	Cleveland, Ohio
2027					Rocket Arena	Cleveland, Ohio
2028					Rocket Arena	Cleveland, Ohio
2029					Rocket Arena	Cleveland, Ohio
2030					Rocket Arena	Cleveland, Ohio

== Performance by school ==
School	Tenure	Championships	Championship years	Appearances	W	L	Pct.
Ball State	1980–present	7	1981, 1986, 1989, 1990, 1993, 1995, 2000	33	37	27	.578
Ohio	1980–present	7	1983, 1985, 1994, 2005, 2010, 2012, 2021	33	38	26	.594
Kent State	1980–present	7	1999, 2001, 2002, 2006, 2008, 2017, 2023	32	34	27	.557
Akron	1993–present	7	2009, 2011, 2013, 2022, 2024, 2025, 2026	17	20	13	.606
Eastern Michigan	1980–present	4	1988, 1991, 1996, 1998	33	25	28	.472
Miami	1980–present	4	1984, 1992, 1997, 2007	33	38	28	.576
Buffalo	1999–present	4	2015, 2016, 2018, 2019	15	11	14	.440
Central Michigan	1980–present	2	1987, 2003	22	14	20	.412
Western Michigan	1980–present	2	2004, 2014	29	20	29	.408
Toledo	1980–present	1	1980	30	26	28	.481
Northern Illinois	1980–1986; 1998–present	1	1982	21	11	18	.379
Bowling Green	1980–present	0	—	32	19	31	.380
UMass	2026–present	0	—	0	0	0	—
Marshall	1998–2005	0	—	8	5	8	.385

Former conference members shaded in ██ silver

== Broadcasters ==
Year	Network	Play-by-play	Analyst
2025	ESPN2	Rich Hollenberg	Jess Settles
2024	ESPN2	Eric Rothman	Mark Adams
2023	ESPN2	Robert Lee	David Padgett
2022	ESPN2	Robert Lee	Mark Wise
2021	ESPN2	Jason Benetti	Jon Crispin
2020 (cancelled)	ESPN2	Roy Philpott	David Padgett
2019	ESPN2	Robert Lee	Julianne Viani
2018	ESPN2	Clay Matvick	Rob Kennedy
2017	ESPN2	Mike Morgan	Chris Spatola
2016	ESPN2	Mike Morgan	Chris Spatola
2015	ESPN2	Bob Wischusen	LaPhonso Ellis
2014	ESPN2	Bob Wischusen	LaPhonso Ellis
2013	ESPN2	Bob Wischusen	Stephen Bardo
2012	ESPN2	Bob Wischusen	Stephen Bardo
2011	ESPN2	Bob Wischusen	Stephen Bardo
2010	ESPN2	Ron Franklin	Mark Adams
2009	ESPN2	Bob Wischusen	Mark Adams
2008	ESPN2	Jon Sciambi	Mark Adams
2007	ESPN2	Michael Reghi	Mark Adams
2006	ESPN2	Scott Graham	Mark Adams
2005	ESPN2	Tim Barnett	Tim McCormick
2004	ESPN2		
2003	ESPN2	Tim Barnett	Tim McCormick
2002	ESPN2	Dave Barnett	Quinn Buckner
2001	ESPN2	Matt Devlin	Doris Burke
2000	ESPN	Derrin Horton	Tim McCormick
1999	ESPN	Ron Franklin	Larry Conley
1998	ESPN		
1997	ESPN	Bob Carpenter	Jimmy Dykes
1996	ESPN	John Walls	Jon Albright
1995	ESPN	Bob Carpenter	Reggie Theus
1994	ESPN	Bob Carpenter	Larry Farmer
1993	ESPN	Dan Patrick	Derrek Dickey
1992	ESPN	Steve Zabriskie	Derrek Dickey
1991	ESPN	Dave Sims	Greg Kelser
1990	ESPN	Wayne Hagin	Greg Kelser
1989	ESPN	Gary Sparber	Jon Albright
1988	ESPN		
1987	ESPN	Dave Diles	Denny Schreiner

== See also ==
- Mid-American Conference women's basketball tournament
