= Turner Battle =

American basketball player (born 1983)

Personal information
- Born: January 11, 1983 (age 43) Kernersville, North Carolina, U.S.
- Listed height: 1.91 m (6 ft 3 in)

Career information
- High school: East Forsyth (Kernersville, North Carolina)
- College: Buffalo (2001–2005)
- NBA draft: 2005: undrafted
- Playing career: 2005–2006
- Position: Point guard
- Number: 11
- Coaching career: 2007–present

Career history

Playing
- 2005: BC Kalev
- 2005: Étendard de Brest
- 2006: Fort Worth Flyers
- 2006: Buffalo Rapids

Coaching
- 2007–2013: Buffalo (assistant)
- 2013–2014: Chattanooga (assistant)
- 2014–2020: UAB (assistant)
- 2020–2021: East Tennessee State (assistant)
- 2021–2022: Middle Tennessee (assistant)

Career highlights
- No. 11 honored by Buffalo Bulls; MAC Player of the Year (2005); First-team All-MAC (2005)

Turner A. Battle (born January 11, 1983) is an American former basketball point guard for the University at Buffalo Bulls men's basketball team from 2001 to 2005. Battle is credited with fueling the resurgence of the Bulls men's basketball program, which went from 5–23 during his sophomore season to a 23-win senior campaign. Battle is now currently athletic director for The Park School of Buffalo, which is in Amherst, New York (north of Buffalo).

== High school ==
The Bulls announced the signing of Battle on November 10, 2000, out of East Forsyth High School in North Carolina. There, he led the Fighting Eagles to a 15–8 record and a conference championship as a senior, while averaging 17 points, five rebounds and five assists per game.

Following his senior season, "All-Star Sports" Editor-in-Chief and college basketball recruiting expert Bob Gibbons had Battle rated as one of the top 100 prospects in the Class of 2001. "I think this is the steal of the millennium," said Gibbons. "Turner Battle could have played for an ACC school. He's a true point guard who is a tremendous floor leader and an outstanding student-athlete."

Battle chose to play college basketball at Buffalo over competing offers from Pittsburgh, Virginia Tech and other schools in part because he wanted to play for UB head coach Reggie Witherspoon. Gibbons would later call Battle "the best thing to happen to Buffalo since the invention of the snowplow."

== College ==
Following a senior season in which Battle averaged 15.5 points, 4.6 rebounds and 4.4 assists per game, Battle led the Bulls to within a last second tip-in of the school's first MAC Championship and an automatic bid in the NCAA Tournament. After the season, Battle was honored as the Mid-American Conference Player of the Year, the first such award for a Buffalo player. Battle was also named to the All-MAC First Team for the first time in his career (he was named All-MAC Honorable Mention following his sophomore season). In addition, Battle was named to the Academic All-MAC squad after his final three seasons with the Bulls.

== Professional ==
Following his collegiate career, Battle signed with BC Kalev/Cramo, a first division team in Estonia before briefly playing for a first division team in France. Battle then signed with the Fort Worth Flyers of the NBADL. On February 1, 2006, Battle returned to Buffalo to play with the Buffalo Rapids of the American Basketball Association.

== Coaching ==
Battle was an assistant coach at Sweet Home High School in the Buffalo suburb of Amherst for the 2006–07 season and on July 5, 2007, he was named assistant coach at his alma mater.

Battle was named assistant coach at Chattanooga on May 23, 2013, under new head coach Will Wade.

Battle was hired by UAB on September 23, 2014, as an assistant coach under Jerod Haase.
