= Yassin Idbihi =

German basketball player (born 1983)

Personal information
- Born: July 24, 1983 (age 42) Cologne, West Germany
- Listed height: 2.08 m (6 ft 10 in)
- Listed weight: 107 kg (236 lb)

Career information
- College: Buffalo (2003–2007)
- NBA draft: 2007: undrafted
- Playing career: 2001–2017
- Position: Power forward / center
- Number: 34

Career history
- 2001–2003: Dragons Rhöndorf
- 2007–2008: Köln 99ers
- 2008–2009: Limoges CSP
- 2009–2010: Phantoms Braunschweig
- 2010–2013: Alba Berlin
- 2013–2015: Bayern Munich
- 2015–2017: Brose Bamberg

Career highlights
- 3 German League champion (2014, 2016, 2017); German Cup winner (2017); 2× Bundesliga All-Star (2011, 2012)

Yassin Markus Idbihi (born July 24, 1983) is a former Moroccan-German professional basketball player. Idbihi spent the majority of his career in Germany and played one season in France for Limoges CSP.

== Professional career ==
He made his professional debut with Dragons Rhöndorf. He then played college basketball at the University at Buffalo. After that he returned to Germany and first played for Köln 99ers, then one season in French Pro B with Limoges CSP and later for Phantoms Braunschweig and Alba Berlin. In July 2013, he signed a two-year deal with Bayern Munich. In July 2015, he signed a two-year deal with Brose Bamberg.

After the 2016–17 season, Idbihi retired and instead joined the staff of Brose Bamberg.
