= Leon Williams (basketball, born 1986) =

American basketball player

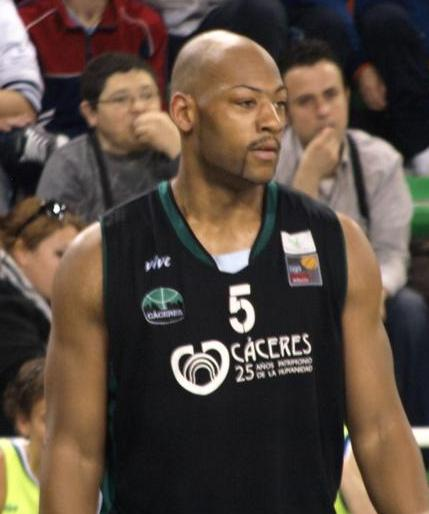
- Leon Williams in action with Cáceres Ciudad del Baloncesto.

Free agent
- Position: Center

Personal information
- Born: July 24, 1986 (age 40) Baltimore, Maryland, U.S.
- Listed height: 6 ft 8 in (2.03 m)
- Listed weight: 246 lb (112 kg)

Career information
- High school: Cardinal Gibbons (Baltimore, Maryland)
- College: Ohio (2004–2008)
- NBA draft: 2008: undrafted
- Playing career: 2008–present

Career history
- 2008–2009: Pınar Karşıyaka
- 2009–2010: Erdemir
- 2010: Strasbourg IG
- 2011–2012: Cáceres
- 2012–2013: Goyang Orions
- 2013: Cangrejeros de Santurce
- 2013–2014: Goyang Orions
- 2014: Cangrejeros de Santurce
- 2014–2015: Anyang KGC
- 2015: Cangrejeros de Santurce
- 2016: Kavala
- 2016: Cangrejeros de Santurce
- 2016: Best Balıkesir
- 2016–2017: Busan KT Sonicboom
- 2017: Brujos de Guayama
- 2017: Busan KT Sonicboom
- 2018: Belize City Defenders
- 2018: Salta Basket
- 2018: Seoul SK Knights
- 2018: Goyang Orion Orions
- 2018–2019: Wonju DB Promy
- 2019: Atenas de Córdoba
- 2019: Jeonju KCC Egis
- 2019–2020: Ulsan Hyundai Mobis Phoebus
- 2020–2021: Changwon LG Sakers
- 2021–2024: Seoul SK Knights
- 2024–2025: Busan KCC Egis

Career highlights
- Korean League champion (2022); Korean League All-Star (2019); First-team All-MAC (2008); Second-team All-MAC (2007); MAC tournament MVP (2005); MAC Freshman of the Year (2005); MAC All-Freshman team (2005)

Leon Vernon Williams Jr. (born July 24, 1986) is an American professional basketball player who last played for Busan KCC Egis of the Korean Basketball League (KBL).

== Career ==
Williams graduated from the Cardinal Gibbons School in 2004. After high school, Williams played college basketball for Ohio University from 2004 to 2008, during that time he also played in the summer league Belize Elite Basketball League for the Belize Bank Bulldogs.

After graduating in 2008, Williams started his professional career in Turkey where he played for two years for Pınar Karşıyaka and then Erdemir where he was the top rebounder of the Turkish Basketball League in both seasons.

In 2010, Williams signed with the French basketball team Strasbourg IG, however, after the pre-season and just before the start of the season he left the team and country without notice and without the clubs consent, invoking either a sick relative or a desire to start a career in real estate, Strasbourg threatened sanctions but nothing came from that.

One year later, after the expiry of his contract, he went to Spain to play for Cáceres Patrimonio de la Humanidad in the Liga Española de Baloncesto, the Spanish basketball second division.

Following that season he moved on to Korean Basketball League side Goyang Orions, partly because of his Korean-American's girlfriend desire to discover her roots, he also announced his intention to become a Korean citizen. After a season in South Korea he moved to Cangrejeros de Santurce in the Baloncesto Superior Nacional whose season succeeds the Korean basketball season, he would alternate between the two leagues for the next three years.

On January 13, 2016, he signed with Kavala of for the rest of the 2015–16 season. He later re-joined the Cangrejeros de Santurce for the 2016 BSN season. On August 5, 2016, Williams signed with Best Balıkesir of Turkey. On December 4, 2016, he parted ways with Balıkesir after averaging 11.7 points and 9.9 rebounds in Turkish top division.

On October 15, 2024, Williams joined Busan KCC Egis of the Korean Basketball League (KBL) to replace Tyler Davis. On January 27, 2025, he was replaced by Donovan Smith.
