= Eastern Michigan Eagles men's basketball =

MAC basketball team from Michigan, USA

2026–27 Eastern Michigan Eagles men's basketball team
- University: Eastern Michigan University
- Head coach: Billy Donlon (1st season)
- Location: Ypsilanti, Michigan
- Arena: George Gervin GameAbove Center (capacity: 8,800)
- Conference: Mid-American
- Nickname: Eagles
- Colors: Green and white

NCAA Division I tournament Final Four
- 1972*
Other NCAA Division I tournament results
Elite Eight	1972*
Sweet Sixteen	1972*, 1991
Appearances	1972*, 1988, 1991, 1996, 1998

Conference tournament champions
- 1988, 1991, 1996, 1998

Conference regular-season champions
- 1915 (Michigan Intercollegiate Conference); 1921, 1925 (MIAA); 1930 (MCC); 1988, 1991, 1996 (MAC) 2010, 2012 MAC West

Conference division champions
- 2010, 2012

Uniforms
Home	Away
- * at Division II level

The Eastern Michigan Eagles men's basketball team represents Eastern Michigan University in Ypsilanti, Michigan. The team currently competes in the Mid-American Conference (MAC). They have appeared in four NCAA Division I tournaments and have a 3–4 record, tied for third best among Michigan colleges. They reached the Sweet Sixteen in the 1991 NCAA Division I men's basketball tournament and defeated the Duke Blue Devils in the first round of the 1996 tournament.

EMU has competed in the MAC since joining in 1972, and previously competed in the Michigan Intercollegiate Athletic Association (1920–1926). The team last played in the NCAA tournament in 1998.

== History ==
=== Ben Braun era ===
Ben Braun served as head coach of the EMU men's basketball team from 1985 to 1996, before leaving to take over the head coaching duties at the University of California-Berkeley. In his 10 ½ seasons as EMU head coach, he led Eastern to its most successful decade as an NCAA Division I school, finishing as the winningest head coach in EMU history with a 185–132 record. During his tenure he was named Mid-American Conference Coach of the Year three times (1987–88, 1990–91, 1995–96). Those three seasons saw the Eagles win Mid-American Conference and MAC tournament championships and NCAA post-season tournament appearances, including a "Sweet 16" appearance in 1990–91. He also coached the 1994–95 team to EMU's first-ever National Invitation Tournament (NIT).

=== Milton Barnes era ===
Following the departure of Ben Braun to California, Eastern Michigan hired Milton Barnes, he would spend four season as a head coach, earning 63 victories in those years.

=== Jim Boone era ===
In 2001, EMU hired Jim Boone to lead its basketball program. Boone compiled a 48–96 record in 5 seasons at the helm.

=== Charles Ramsey era ===
Ypsilanti native and EMU graduate Charles Ramsey was hired following the 2005 season. In his first game as head coach, Ramsey pulled off an upset over a Ben Braun coached California team, however that would be the highlight of his stint as head coach in Ypsilanti. After a 68–118 record in six years at the helm, EMU would fire Ramsey after the 2010–11 basketball season.

=== Rob Murphy era ===
Rob Murphy, a Detroit native was hired in the spring of 2011 to take over for Charles Ramsey. Prior to EMU, Murphy spent seven years as an assistant coach at Syracuse under Jim Boeheim. In his first season, Murphy would lead the Eagles to a 14–18 record. However, with its 9–7 record in conference play, the Eagles took 1st place in the MAC-West. In 2021, he left the team to join the Motor City Cruise of the NBA G League as president and general manager.

== Postseason ==
=== NCAA Tournament Division I results ===
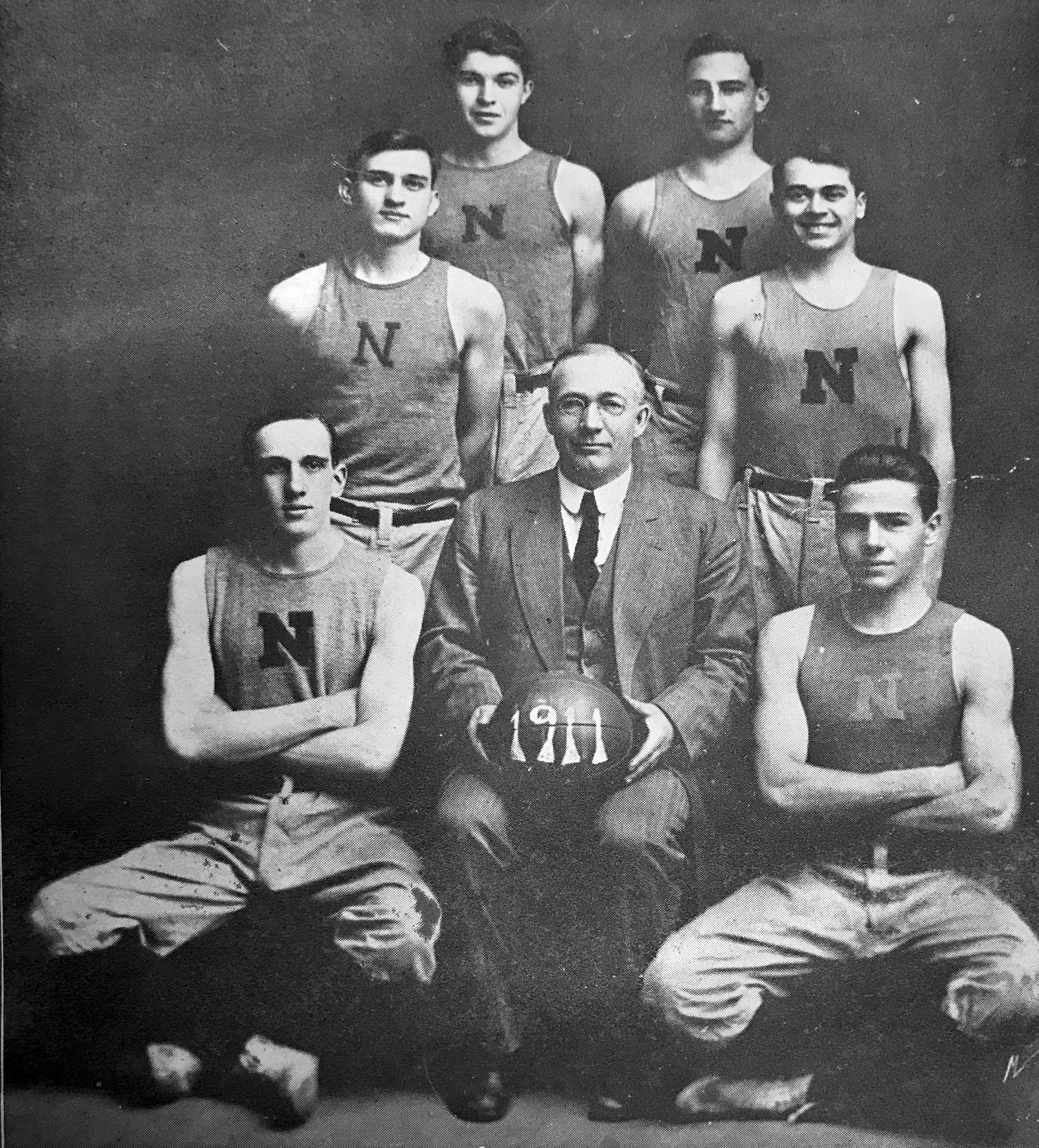
Eastern Michigan team of 1911

The Eagles have appeared in four NCAA Division I Tournaments. Their combined record is 3–4.

Year	Seed	Round	Opponent	Result
1988	#15	Round of 64	#2 Pittsburgh	L 90–109
1991	#12	Round of 64; Round of 32; Sweet Sixteen	#5 Mississippi State #13 Penn State #1 North Carolina	W 76–56; W 71–68 ^{OT} L 93–67
1996	#9	Round of 64; Round of 32	#8 Duke #1 Connecticut	W 75–60; L 95–81
1998	#13	Round of 64	#4 Michigan State	L 83–71

Coach Ben Braun led Eastern Michigan to their first three NCAA Division I tournament appearances during his 11-year tenure. One of the great highlights in team history came after EMU's first round victory over Duke in 1996, when the Blue Devils' Head Coach Mike Krzyzewski stated, "Eastern Michigan is very well coached, much deeper than we are and, today, much quicker than we were."

=== NIT results ===
The Eagles have appeared in one National Invitation Tournament (NIT). Their record is 0–1.

Year	Round	Opponent	Result
1995	First round	Bradley	L 86–85 ^{2OT}

=== CBI results ===
The Eagles have appeared in the College Basketball Invitational (CBI) one time. Their record is 0–1.

Year	Round	Opponent	Result
2015	First round	Louisiana–Monroe	L 71–67

=== CIT results ===
The Eagles have appeared in the CollegeInsider.com Postseason Tournament (CIT) two times. Their combined record is 2–2.

Year	Round	Opponent	Result
2014	First round Second Round	Norfolk State; Columbia	W 58–54; L 69–56
2018	First round Second Round	Niagara; Sam Houston State	W 83–65; L 69-62

=== NCAA Division II Tournament results ===
The Eagles have appeared in the NCAA Division II tournament one time. Their record is 3–2.

Year	Round	Opponent	Result
1972	Regional semifinals Regional Finals; Elite Eight; Final Four; National Third Place game	Kentucky Wesleyan; Evansville; Assumption; Roanoke; Tennessee State	W 61–59; W 93–88; W 93–88; L 99-73; L 107-82

EMU reached the Final Four of the 1972 NCAA College Division National Championship, led by All-American George Gervin, an NBA Hall of Famer selected as one of the 50 Greatest Players in NBA History.

=== NAIA District 23 playoff ===
Year	Round	Opponent	Result
1963	First round	Northern Michigan	L 99-81
1967	First round	Hillsdale	L 74-72
1968	First round Second round	Aquinas; Michigan Lutheran	W 104–88; W 82–80
1969	First round Second round	Michigan Lutheran; Michigan Lutheran	W 90–70; W 99–87
1970	First round Second round	Aquinas; Ferris State	W 106–67; W 111–69
1971	First round Second round	Lake Superior State; Ferris State	W 96–66; W 96–86

=== NAIA National Division I Tournament ===
Year	Round	Opponent	Result
1968	First round Second round Elite Eight	Stephen F. Austin Hanover Westminster	W 82–80 W 94–81 L 92-84
1969	First round Second round	Georgetown (KY) Eastern New Mexico	W 87–85 L 77-69
1970	First round Second round	East Central State Guilford	W 108–85 L 89-85
1971	First round Second round Elite Eight National semifinals National Championship	Ohio Dominican Whittier Eau Claire State Fairmont State Kentucky State	W 119–81 W 71–70 W 87–80 W 89–78 L 102-82

== Mid-American Conference tournament Results ==
Year	Round	Opponent	Result
1980	First round	Bowling Green	L 54-49
1981	First round	Toledo	L 95-88
1982	First round	Western Michigan	L 44-42
1983	First round	Ohio	L 74-60
1984	First round Second round	Bowling Green Kent State	W 64–58 L 67-58
1985	First round	Kent State	L 84-74
1987	First round Second round	Miami Central Michigan	W 87–64 L 80-76
1988	Semifinals Finals	Western Michigan Ohio	W 95–88 W 94–80
1989	First round Second round	Miami Ball State	W 70–69 L 77-76
1990	First round Second round	Bowling Green Ball State	W 62–60 L 69-58
1991	Second round Semifinals Finals	Kent State Bowling Green Toledo	W 66–47 W 72–66 W 67–66
1992	First round	Miami	L 67-66
1993	First round	Western Michigan	L 65-57
1994	First round	Miami	L 90-60
1995	Second round Semifinals Finals	Toledo Ohio Ball State	W 69–61 W 78–72 L 77-70
1996	Second round Semifinals Finals	Kent State Ball State Toledo	W 84–72 W 87–71 W 77–63
1997	Second round Semifinals Finals	Ball State Bowling Green Miami	W 85–75 W 73–64 L 96-76
1998	Quarterfinals Semifinals Finals	Toledo Ball State Miami	W 98–79 W 93–92 W 92–77
2000	First round	Miami	L 64-51
2001	First round	Toledo	L 67-43
2002	First round	Toledo	L 89-53
2003	First round	Marshall	L 83-75
2004	First round	Marshall	L 78-59
2005	First round	Akron	L 78–66
2006	First round	Western Michigan	L 60-55
2007	First round Quarterfinals	Ball State Toledo	W 51–48 L 62-54
2008	First round Quarterfinals	Ball State Western Michigan	W 59–55 L 70-61
2009	First round	Central Michigan	L 62-49
2010	First round Quarterfinals	Northern Illinois Akron	W 65–59 L 97-89
2011	First round	Akron	L 67-53
2012	First round	Northern Illinois	L 55-52
2013	First round Second round Quarterfinals	Northern Illinois Miami Western Michigan	W 45–44 W 58–47 L 70-55
2014	First round Second round Quarterfinals Semifinals	Central Michigan Northern Illinois Buffalo Toledo	W 72–60 W 53–48 W 69–64 L 59-44
2015	First round Second round Quarterfinals	Miami Bowling Green Toledo	W 62–61 W 73–67 L 78-67
2016	First round Quarterfinals	Toledo Akron	W 69-60 L 65-63
2017	First round Quarterfinals	Northern Illinois Akron	W 72-69 L 79-62
2018	Quarterfinals	Akron	L 67-58
2019	First round	Ball State	L 61-43
2020	First round	Kent State	L 86-76

== Championships ==
=== Michigan MAC Trophy ===
- 2021-22

=== Jersey Mike's Jamaica Classic Champions ===
- 2019-20

=== EMU Showcase Champions ===
- 2014-15

=== EMU "Ice Man" Classic Champions ===
- 2012-13

=== Reese Trophy Winners ===
- 2007-08

=== Carrier Classic Champions ===
- 1996-97

=== Hawai'i-Hilo Classic Champions ===
- 1996-97

=== Hatter Classic Champions ===
- 1989-90

=== Toledo Blade Classic Champions ===
- 1985-86

=== Motor City Classic Champions ===
- 1979-80

=== Ashland Tournament Champions ===
- 1971-72

=== Pasadena Holiday Tournament Champions ===
- 1970-71

=== Wayne State Centennial Classic Champions ===
- 1967-68

=== Marshall Classic Champions ===
- 1966-67

=== Flint Christmas Tournament Champions ===
- 1958-59
- 1959-60

=== IIAC All-Sports Trophy Winners ===
- 1953-54

=== Central Michigan Tournament/Midwest College Invitational Champions ===
- 1946-47

=== Michigan Collegiate Conference Champions ===
- 1929-30

=== Michigan Intercollegiate Athletic Association Championships ===
- 1920-21

=== Michigan Normal Championships ===
- 1907-08
- 1912-13
- 1914-15
- 1916-17

== All-time win–loss record ==
Season	Coach	Overall	Conference	Standing	Postseason	Leading scorer	Leading rebounder
Lemley P. Whitcomb (Independent)
1897–98	Whitcomb	2–1					
Ernest E. Crook (Independent)
1898–99	Crook	1–1					
Leslie A. Butler (Independent)
1899–1900	Butler	1–1				C.A. Palmer (13)	
M. Everett Dick (Independent)
1900–01	Dick	0–4					
Clayton T. Teetzel (Independent)
1901–02	Teetzel	1–0				Charles M. Novak (4)	
1902–03	Teetzel	2-6				Charles M. Novak (20)	
Wilbur P. Bowen (Independent)
1903–04	Bowen	3–7			1-1	Jason Hayward	
1904–05	Bowen	8–3					
1905–06	Bowen	4–4					
1906–07	Bowen	2–8					
1907–08	Bowen	3–5					
1908–09	Bowen	6–5				Roland Chapman/Fred Currier	
Clare Hunter (Independent)
1909–10	Hunter	10–2					
1910–11	Hunter	4–7				R. Paddock	
Frederick Beyerman (Independent)
1911–12	Beyerman	3–8				L. Hindelang/Macmillan	
LeRoy Brown (Independent)
1912–13	Brown	6–2				Bernard Goodrich	
1913–14	Brown	8–4				Elton Rynearson	
Thomas Ransom (Michigan Intercollegiate Conference)
1914–15	Ransom	10–4	4–1	1st			
Elmer D. Mitchell (Independent)
1915–16	Mitchell	10–4				Green	
1916–17	Mitchell	16–1				Donald D. Lawler	
Elton J. Rynearson (Independent)
1917–18	Rynearson	14–1					
1918–19	Rynearson	10–4				Eddie Powers	
1919–20	Rynearson	13–2				Allen Morris	
Michigan Intercollegiate Athletic Association (MIAA) (1920–1926)							
1920–21	Rynearson	13–4	8–1	1st		Perry Deakin/Bill Williams/Marshall Wilkshire	
Joseph H. McCulloch (1921–1925)
1921–22	McCulloch	11–6	6–1	2nd		Harold C. Dillon	
1922–23	McCulloch	14–8	6–4	3rd		Harold Dillon	
1923–24	McCulloch	13–9	5–4	2nd		James Barclay	
1924–25	McCulloch	15–7	7–1	1st		LeRoy Pfahler	
Elton J. Rynearson Michigan Collegiate Conference (MCC) (1925–1931)
1925–26	Rynearson	14–5	10–2	2nd		Davis Baer	
1926–27	Rynearson	11–9	3-3				
1927–28	Rynearson	10–12	1-5				
1928–29	Rynearson	13–6	3-3				
1929–30	Rynearson	7–8	3-1	1st		Allan Giles	
1930–31	Rynearson	8–5	3-3	2nd		Walter Kazlusky	
1931–32	Rynearson	13–4				Ed Gabel (188)	
Harry Ockerman (1932–1935)							
1932–33	Ockerman	15–2				Ted Goode (120)	
1933–34	Ockerman	11–7				Chuck Hanneman (125)	
1934–35	Ockerman	8–7				Glen Haidt/Chuck Hanneman	
Elton J. Rynearson (1917–21; 1925–32; 1935–40; 1944–46)
1935–36	Rynearson	3–12				Chuck Hanneman	
1936–37	Rynearson	6–10					
1937–38	Rynearson	8–6				James Walsh	
1938–39	Rynearson	5–11				James Walsh (135)	
1939–40	Rynearson	6–12				Ken Hendy/Dick Yeagar	
Frank Worzniak (1940–41)
1940–41	Rynearson/Worzniak	4–13				Burman Misenar (136)	
Ray Stites (1941–44, 1946–47)
1941–42	Stites	12–7				Charles Sampier (161)	
1942–43	Stites	6–9				Ed Gilday	
1943–44	Stites	4–8				Charles Greig	
Elton J. Rynearson (1917–21; 1925–32; 1935–40; 1944–46)
1944–45	Rynearson	1–11				Bob Bentley	
1945–46	Rynearson	9–9				Howard Messenger (266)	
Ray Stites (1941–44, 1946–47)
1946–47	Stites	9–9				Charles Sampier	
William Crouch (1947–53)
1947–48	Crouch	5–13				Leo Turner	
1948–49	Crouch	7–12				Fred Jackson (314)	
1949–50	Crouch	6–12				Fred Jackson	
Interstate Intercollegiate Athletic Conference (IIAC) 1950–1961							
1950–51	Crouch	7–12	2–10			Stan Tomczyk (250)	
1951–52	Crouch	9–11	5–5			Webster Kirksey (325)	
1952–53	Crouch	14–6	7–5	2nd		Webster Kirksey	
Robert Hollway (1953–54)
1953–54	Hollway	8–12	4–8	6th		Cleon Gilliam	
James Skala (1954–1960)
1954–55	Skala	14–8	7–4	2nd		Andy Shepard	
1955–56	Skala	5–17	2–10	7th		Dave Parks	
1956–57	Skala	9–14	6–6			Dave Parks	
1957–58	Skala	1–20	0–12	7th		Charles Crickmore	
1958–59	Skala	8–13	3–9	7th		Frank Manley	
1959–60	Skala	7–13	1–11	7th		Bill Stephens	Tom Mackenzie
J. Richard Adams (1960–1966)
1960–61	Adams	5–18	0–12	7th		Ron Gulyas	Don Massey
1961–62	Adams	8–13	3–9			Don Massey	Gary Clark
1962–63	Adams	11–9			0–1	Ed Gallup	Ed Gallup
Presidents' Athletic Conference (PAC) 1963–1966
1963–64	Adams	9–9	6–6	4th		Ed Gallup	Ed Gallup
1964–65	Adams	11–7	8–4	3rd		Rod Marlatt	Steve Ditchkof
Harry Ockerman (1965–1966)
1965–66	Ockerman	15–3	11–1	2nd		Rod Marlatt	Larry Brose
James D. Dutcher (1966–1972)
1966–67	Dutcher	18–7			0–1	Harvey Marlatt	Tuggle Bowens
1967–68	Dutcher	20–9			4–1	Earle Higgins	Kennedy McIntosh
1968–69	Dutcher	20–9			3–1	Kennedy McIntosh	Kennedy McIntosh
1969–70	Dutcher	22–7			3–1	Kennedy McIntosh	Kennedy McIntosh
1970–71	Dutcher	23–10			6–1	Kennedy McIntosh	Kennedy McIntosh
1971–72	Dutcher	24–7			3–2	George Gervin	George Gervin
Allan Freund (1972–1976)
1972–73	Freund	8–17				Gary Tyson	Leonard Cole
1973–74	Freund	8–18				Gary Tyson (583)	Talmadge Bell
Mid-American Conference (MAC) 1974–1997							
1974–75	Freund	12–14	4–9	6th		Bob Riddle (451)	Bob Riddle (256)
1975–76	Freund/Ray Scott	7–20	1–15	10th		Bob Riddle (405)	Bob Riddle (209)
Ray Scott (1976–1979)
1976–77	Scott	9–18	4–12	8th		Bill Weaver (343)	Bob Riddle (333)
1977–78	Scott	11–16	7–9	6th		Ken Harmon (332)	Ken Harmon (230)
1978–79	Scott/Tim Gilligan	9–18	5–11	9th		Gary Green (502)	Gary Green (211)
Jim Boyce (1979–1986)
1979–80	Boyce	13–14	7–9	4th	0–1	Kelvin Blakely (433)	Jeff Zatkof (181)
1980–81	Boyce	13–14	8–8	6th	0–1	Jeff Zatkof (473)	Jeff Zatkof (181)
1981–82	Boyce	15–13	8–8	4th	0–1	Jeff Zatkof (449)	Jeff Zatkof (212)
1982–83	Boyce	12–16	8–10	6th	0–1	Marlow McClain (437)	Vince Giles (196)
1983–84	Boyce	12–17	8–10	6th	1–1	Fred Cofield (453)	Vince Giles (249)
1984–85	Boyce	15–13	9–9	5th	0–1	Fred Cofield (577)	Vince Giles (267)
1985–86	Boyce/Ben Braun	9–18	5–13	9th		Percy Cooper (375)	Grant Long (178)
Ben Braun (1986–1996)
1986–87	Braun	14–15	8–8	4th	1–1	Grant Long (433)	Lewis Scott (87)
1987–88	Braun	22–8	14–2	1st	2–1	Grant Long (689)	Grant Long (313)
1988–89	Braun	17–12	9–8	4th	1–1	Lorenzo Neely (379)	Isaac Henderson (171)
1989–90	Braun	19–13	8–8	5th	1–1	Lorenzo Neely (429)	Kory Hallas (201)
1990–91	Braun	26–7	13–3	1st	5–1	Marcus Kennedy (659)	Marcus Kennedy (266)
1991–92	Braun	9–22	4–13	8th	0–1	Bryant Kennedy (435)	Kory Hallas (226)
1992–93	Braun	13–17	8–10	6th	0–1	Ellery Morgan (464)	Wayne Simpson (172)
1993–94	Braun	15–12	10–8	5th	0–1	Kareem Carpenter (498)	Kareem Carpenter (242)
1994–95	Braun	20–10	12–6	3rd	2–2	Brian Tolbert (509)	Kareem Carpenter (343)
1995–96	Braun	25–6	14–4	1st	4–1	Brian Tolbert (635)	James Head (199)
Milton Barnes (1996–2000)
1996–97	Barnes	22–10	11–7	4th	3–1	Earl Boykins (611)	James Head (204)
Mid-American Conference (MAC) West Division 1997–2020							
1997–98	Barnes	20–10	13–5	3rd	3–1	Earl Boykins (746)	James Head (201)
1998–99	Barnes	5–20	5–13	3rd		Calvin Warner (267)	Calvin Warner (167)
1999–2000	Barnes	15–13	9–9	3rd	0–1	Calvin Warner (408)	Calvin Warner (195)
Jim Boone (2000–2005)
2000–01	Boone	3–25	1–17	6th	0–1	Melvin Hicks (368)	Tyson Radney (233)
2001–02	Boone	6–24	2–16	6th	0–1	Ricky Cottrill (582)	Steve Pettyjohn (196)
2002–03	Boone	14–14	8–10	4th	0–1	Ryan Prillman	Steve Pettyjohn
2003–04	Boone	13–15	7–11	5th	0–1	Markus Austin	John Bowler
2004–05	Boone	12–18	5–13	6th	0–1	Markus Austin	James "Boo" Jackson
Charles E. Ramsey (2005–2011)							
2005–06	Ramsey	7–21	3–15	5th	0–1	John Bowler	John Bowler
2006–07	Ramsey	13–19	6–10	4th	1–1	Jesse Bunkley	Brandon Bowdry
2007–08	Ramsey	14–17	8–8	2nd	1–1	Carlos Medlock	Travis Lewis
2008–09	Ramsey	8–24	6–10	4th	0–1	Brandon Bowdry	Brandon Bowdry
2009–10	Ramsey	17–15	8–8	2nd	0–1	Carlos Medlock	Brandon Bowdry
2010–11	Ramsey	9–22	5–11	4th	0–1	Brandon Bowdry	Brandon Bowdry
Rob Murphy (2011–2021)							
2011–12	Murphy	14–18	9–7	1st	0–1	Darrell Lampley	Jamell Harris
2012–13	Murphy	16–18	7–9	4th	2–1	Derek Thompson	Da'Shonte Riley
2013–14	Murphy	22–15	10–8	3rd	4–2	Karrington Ward	Karrington Ward
2014–15	Murphy	21–14	8–10	4th	2–2	Raven Lee	Karrington Ward
2015–16	Murphy	18–15	9–9	4th	1–1	Raven Lee	James Thompson IV
2016–17	Murphy	16–17	7–11	4th	1–1	Ray Lee	James Thompson IV
2017–18	Murphy	22–13	11–7	2nd	1–1	Elijah Minnie	James Thompson IV
2018–19	Murphy	15–17	9–9	3rd	0–1	Paul Jackson	James Thompson IV
2019–20	Murphy	16–16	6–12	5th	0–1	Ty Groce	Boubacar Toure
Mid-American Conference (MAC) 2021–Current							
2020–21	Murphy	6–12	3–11	10th		Ty Groce	Ty Groce
Stan Heath (2022–Current)							
2021–22	Heath	10–21	5–15	11th		Noah Farrakhan	Nate Scott
2022–23	Heath	8–23	5–13	9th		Emoni Bates	Emoni Bates
2023–24	Heath	13–18	6–12	11th		Tyson Acuff	Jalin Billingsley
2024–25	Heath	16–16	9–9	7th	0–1	Jalen Terry	Da'Sean Nelson

== Players ==
Players Drafted & Undrafted in the NBA and NBA-DL

Year	Player	Round	Pick	Team
1970	Earle Higgins	3	2	San Francisco
1970	Harvey Marlatt	16	2	Detroit
1971	Kennedy McIntosh	1	15	Chicago
1972	Dwaine Dillard	6	9	Baltimore
1973	Lindell Reason	8	3	Portland
1974	George Gervin	3	4	Phoenix
1977	Bob Riddle	7	10	Cleveland
1980	Kevin Blakley	5	16	Kansas City
1983	Marlow McLain	9	8	Detroit
1985	Fred Cofield	4	3	New York
1985	Vincent Giles	6	17	Detroit
1988	Grant Long	2	8	Miami
1991	Marcus Kennedy	2	27	Portland
1991	Carl Thomas	Undrafted		Sacramento
1991	Charles Thomas	Undrafted		Detroit
1998	Derrick Dial	2	23	San Antonio
1998	Earl Boykins	Undrafted		New Jersey
2001	Corey Tarrant*	9	69	Asheville
2006	DeSean Hadley*	2	23	Sioux Falls
2010	Carlos Medlock*	6	9	Utah
2012	Brandon Bowdry*	3	37	Erie
2015	Karrington Ward*	2	1	Bakersfield Jam
2015	Da'Shonte Riley*	4	1	Idaho Stampede
2016	Karrington Ward*	4	2	Oklahoma City Blue
2023	Emoni Bates	2	19	Cleveland

*NBA-DL

=== Retired numbers ===
No.	Player	Tenure	Ref.
11	Earl Boykins	1994–1998	
24	George Gervin	1971–1972	
43	Grant Long	1985–1988	
54	Kennedy McIntosh	1967–1971	

== Awards ==
=== All-MIAA ===
- Harold Osborne (1921-22)

=== 1st Team All-MIAA ===
- Francis Davidson (1923-24)

=== All-Peninsula Team ===
- Joe Schwall (1925-26)
- James Barclay (1925-26)
- Joe Kazlusky (1925-26)

=== Michigan Collegiate Conference Honors ===
- George Muellich (1927-28)

=== All-Opponent's Team ===
- John Shada (1941-42)
- Leo Turner (1949-50)

=== 1st Team All-IIAC ===
- Webster Kirksey (1952-53)
- Webster Kirksey (1953-54)

=== 2nd Team All-IIAC ===
- Webster Kirksey (1951-52)
- Cleon Gilliam (1952-53)
- Owen Sudman (1952-53)
- William J. Stephens (1957-58)
- Ron Gulyas (1960-61)

=== NAIA All-Star State of Michigan Team ===
- William J. Stephens (1957-58)

=== Michigan N.A.I.A. Coach of the Year ===
- J. Richard Adams (1962-63)

=== All-PAC ===
- Gary Clark (1963-64)
- Ed Gallup (1963-64)
- Steve Ditchkoff (1964-65)
- Rod Marlatt (1964-65)

=== All-Tournament NAIA Team ===
- Earle Higgins (1967-68)

=== EMU Athlete of the Year ===
- Al Jagutis (1970)

=== UPI 1st Team NCAA-College Division All-America ===
- Earle Higgins (1969-70)
- George Gervin (1971-72)

=== Coaches 1st Team NCAA-College Division All-America ===
- George Gervin (1971-72)

=== All-District Team ===
- Earle Higgins (1969-70)
- Al Jagutis (1969-70)
- Kennedy Mcintosh (1969-70)

=== Coach of the Year ===
- James D. Dutcher (1969-70)

=== NAIA second-team All-District 23 ===
- Earl Dixon (1970-71)

=== NAIA Honorable Mention All-America ===
- Earl Dixon (1970-71)

=== Motor City Classic MVP ===
Marlow McClain (1979-80)

=== Motor City Classic All-Tournament Team ===
Marlow McClain (1979-80) Kelvin Blakely (1979-80)

=== Motor City Classic Outstanding Defensive Player ===
- Marlow McClain (1979-80)

=== MAC Awards ===
==== MAC Player of the Year ====
- Grant Long (1987-88)
- Marcus Kennedy (1990-91)
- Earl Boykins (1997-98)

==== 1st Team All-MAC ====
- Jeff Zatkoff (1980-81)
- Fred Cofield (1984-85)
- Grant Long (1986-87)
- Grant Long (1987-88)
- Marcus Kennedy (1990-91)
- Lorenzo Neely (1990-91)
- Kory Hallas (1991-92)
- Kareem Carpenter (1993-94)
- Brian Tolbert (1995-96)
- Brian Tolbert (1996-97)
- Earl Boykins (1996-97)
- Earl Boykins (1997-98)
- John Bowler (2005-06)
- James Thompson IV (2017-18)

==== 2nd Team All-MAC ====
- Bob Riddle (1974-75)
- Gary Green (1978-79)
- Kelvin Blakely (1979-80)
- Jeff Zatkoff (1981-82)
- Fred Cofield (1983-84)
- Vince Giles (1983-84)
- Percy Cooper (1985-86)
- Mike McCall (1986-87)
- Howard Chambers (1987-88)
- Lorenzo Neely (1989-90)
- Carl Thomas (1990-91)
- Ellery Morgan (1992-93)
- Brian Tolbert (1994-95)
- Kareem Carpenter (1994-95)
- Earl Boykins (1995-96)
- Derrick Dial (1996-97)
- Derrick Dial (1997-98)
- Ryan Prillman (2002-03)
- Brandon Bowdry (2008-09)
- Brandon Bowdry (2009-10)
- Carlos Medlock (2009-10)
- Brandon Bowdry (2010-11)
- James Thompson IV (2015-16)
- James Thompson IV (2016-17)
- James Thompson IV (2018-19)
- Da'Sean Nelson (2024-25)
- Jalen Terry (2024-25)

==== 3rd Team All-MAC ====
- Darrell Lampley (2011-12)
- Karrington Ward (2013-14)
- Ray Lee (2014-15)
- Elijah Minnie (2017-18)
- Emoni Bates (2022-23)
- Tyson Acuff (2023-24)

==== MAC West Player of the Week ====
- Dec. 28, 2003 John Bowler
- Nov. 10, 2006 Carlos Medlock
- Jan. 01, 2007 Jesse Bunkley
- Nov. 13, 2007 Carlos Medlock
- Jan. 18, 2009 Brandon Bowdry
- Mar. 09, 2009 Brandon Bowdry
- Nov. 16, 2009 Brandon Bowdry
- Nov. 30, 2009 Carlos Medlock
- Dec. 07, 2009 Brandon Bowdry
- Feb. 08, 2010 Carlos Medlock
- Feb. 07, 2011 Brandon Bowdry
- Nov. 21, 2011 Darrell Lampley
- Feb. 27, 2012 Darrell Lampley
- Dec. 16, 2013 Ray Lee
- Feb. 17, 2014 Da'Shonte Riley
- Nov. 24, 2014 Ray Lee
- Feb. 16, 2015 Karrington Ward
- Mar. 07, 2015 Mike Talley
- Feb. 15, 2016 James Thompson IV
- Mar. 05, 2016 Tim Bond
- Nov. 28, 2016 James Thompson IV
- Jan. 03, 2017 Jordan Nobles
- Dec. 18, 2018 James Thompson IV

==== MAC Player of the Week ====
- Feb. 16, 1980 Kelvin Blakely
- Dec. 12, 1984 Vince Giles
- Nov. 13, 2006 Carlos Medlock
- Nov. 13, 2007 Carlos Medlock
- Nov. 24, 2007 Justin Dobbins
- Dec. 13, 2021 Bryce McBride
- Feb. 19, 2024 Tyson Acuff

==== MAC Freshman Of The Year ====
- Lorenzo Neely (1987-88)
- James Thompson IV (2016-17)

==== MAC Coach of the Year ====
- Ben Braun (1987-88)
- Ben Braun (1990-91)
- Ben Braun (1995-96)
- Rob Murphy (2011-12)

==== MAC All-Freshman team ====
- Lorenzo Neely (1987-88)
- Kory Hallas (1989-90)
- Earl Boykins (1994-95)
- C.J. Grantham (1999-00)
- Carlos Medlock (2005-06)
- Brandon Bowdry (2006-07)
- James Thompson IV (2015-16)
- Mo Njie (2021-22)
- Arne Osojnik (2023-24)

==== MAC All-Tournament Team ====
- Grant Long (1986-87)
- Grant Long (1987-88)
- Lorenzo Neely (1987-88)
- Lorenzo Neely (1990-91)
- Marcus Kennedy (1990-91)
- Brian Tolbert (1994-95)
- Theron Wilson (1994-95)
- Brian Tolbert (1995-96)
- Earl Boykins (1995-96)
- Theron Wilson (1995-96)
- Derrick Dial (1996-97)
- Earl Boykins (1997-98)
- Derrick Dial (1997-98)
- Carlos Medlock (2009-10)
- Paul Jackson (2017-18)

==== MAC Tournament MVP ====
- Grant Long (1987-88)
- Marcus Kennedy (1990-91)
- Brian Tolbert (1995-96)
- Earl Boykins (1997-98)

==== MAC Defensive Player of the Year ====
- DaShonte Rile (2013-14)
- Tim Bond (2017-18)

==== Academic All-MAC ====
- Dan Hoff (1974-75)
- Walter Jones (1974-75)
- Dan Hoff (1975-76)
- Walter Jones (1975-76)
- Pat Miller (1980-81)
- Nkechi Ezugwu (1997-98)
- Steve Pettyjohn (2002-03)
- Daylen Harrison (2013-14)
- Olalekan Ajayi (2014-15)
- Trent Perry (2014-15)
- Trent Perry (2015-16)
- Blake Brown (2016-17)
- Nick Madray (2016-17)
- James Thompson IV (2016-17)
- Paul Jackson (2017-18)
- Paul Jackson (2018-19)
- Yusuf Jihad (2022-23)
- Yusuf Jihad (2023-24)

==== Academic All-MAC Honorable Mention ====
- J.R. Sims (2012-13)

==== MAC All-Defensive team ====
- 2016 Tim Bond
- 2017 Tim Bond
- 2018 James Thompson IV
- 2019 James Thompson IV

==== Pre-Season All-MAC ====
- Brian Tolbert (1995-96)
- Theron Wilson (1995-96)
- Earl Boykins (1997-98)
- Derrick Dial (1997-98)

==== Preseason 1st Team All-MAC West Division ====
- Ricky Cottrill (2002-03)
- John Bowler (2003-04)
- John Bowler (2004-05)
- John Bowler (2005-06)
- Carlos Medlock (2007-08)
- Carols Medlock (2008-09)
- Glenn Bryant (2013-14)
- Karrington Ward (2014-15)
- Ray Lee (2014-15)
- James Thompson IV (2015-16)
- James Thompson IV (2016-17)

==== Pre-Season All-MAC 2nd Team ====
- Emoni Bates (2022-23)

==== MAC All-Defense ====
- Tim Bond (2015-16)
- Tim Bond (2016-17)
- James Thompson IV (2017-18)
- Tim Bond (2017-18)
- James Thompson IV (2018-19)
- Boubacar Toure (2019-20)

=== National Awards ===
==== Pre-season Honorable Mention All-American ====
- Grant Long (1987-88)

==== National Association of Basketball Coaches All-Star ====
- Marcus Kennedy (1990-91)

==== The Frances Pomeroy Naismith Award ====
- Earl Boykins (1997-98)

==== Honorable Mention All-American ====
- Earl Boykins (1997-98)

==== "1998 John Wooden ""Player of the Year"" Award Nominee" ====
- Earl Boykins (1997-98)

==== USA Basketball Male Athlete of the Year ====
- Earl Boykins (1997-98)

==== National Association of Basketball Coaches District 14 2nd Team ====
- Brandon Bowdry (2009-10)

==== Sporting News Preseason Top 10 Player ====
- James Thompson IV (2016-17)

==== Co-Coach of the Year in the NCAA District 14 Division I ====
- Rob Murphy (2011-12)

==== Cosida Academic All-American Selections 2nd Team ====
- Dan Hoff (1975-76)

==== All-Freshman Team ====
- Earl Boykins (1993-94)

==== E-Club Hall of Fame ====
- 2014 Lorenzo Neely
- 2013 Earl Boykins
- 2013 Derrick Dial
- 2012 Brian Tolbert
- 2008 Lindell Reason
- 2007 Al Jagutis
- 2006 Gary Tyson
- 2005 Ben Braun
- 2005 Harold Simons
- 2004 Earl Dixon
- 2003 Jim Dutcher
- 2000 Jack Brusewitz
- 1998 Grant Long
- 1997 Earle Higgins
- 1996 Kennedy McIntosh
- 1994 Robert Sims
- 1994 C.P. Steimle
- 1993 Joe Brodie
- 1993 George Gervin
- 1993 Nick Manych
- 1992 Cleon Gilliam
- 1992 Leo Turner
- 1991 James Ross
- 1991 Claude Snarey
- 1989 William M. Cave
- 1989 Ron Gulyas
- 1988 Sherm J. Collins
- 1987 William J. Stephens
- 1985 Charles Paige
- 1983 Charles Lappeus
- 1983 Neville "Tex" Walker
- 1982 Clifford D. Crane
- 1982 Marvin R. Mittlestat
- 1979 Louis Batterson
- 1979 Harvey Marlatt
- 1979 George Muellich
- 1979 Arthur D. Walker
- 1979 Frank "Buck" Weeber
- 1978 William E. Crouch
- 1978 Daniel Webster Kirksey
- 1978 James A. Walsh
- 1977 C. Dale Curtiss
- 1977 Harry Ockerman
- 1976 Edwin Shadford
- 1976 Raymond L. Stites

== vs Michigan Universities ==
- Central Michigan University (MAC) 103–106
- Western Michigan University (MAC) 60–65
- University of Michigan (B1G) 3–29
- Michigan State University (B1G) 4–31
- University of Detroit Mercy (Horizon) 20–51
- Oakland University (Horizon) 11–9
- Adrian College 48-13
- Albion College 50-14
- Alma College 35-20
- Aquinas College 4-0
- Davenport University 1-0
- Ferris State 15-3
- Grand Valley State 7-1
- Hillsdale College 49-23
- Hope College 10-24
- Kalamazoo College 16-13
- Lake Superior State 3-0
- Madonna University 4-0
- Michigan Tech 7-0
- University of Michigan–Dearborn 2-0
- Northern Michigan 28-6
- Northwood University 6-0
- University of Olivet 18-2
- Rochester Christian University 11-0
- Saginaw Valley State 2-0
- Siena Heights 5-0
- Spring Arbor University 1-0
- Wayne State 39-49

*As of April 17, 2024

== Statistics ==
=== National statistical champions ===
- 2013/14 NCAA Statistical Championship for field goal percentage defense (36.9%)

=== MAC Statistical Champions Team Season ===
- 1986/87 Best 3-point field goal percentage Season (.465)
- 1987 scoring offense (76.8)
- 1987 rebounding (36.1)
- 1987 three-point field goal Pct. (.465)
- 1987 three-point field goals made (144)
- 1988 scoring offense (82.6)
- 1989 scoring offense (77.7)
- 1991 field goal percentage (.514)
- 1991 free throw percentage (.727)
- 1996 scoring offense (83.7)
- 1997 field goal percentage (.495)
- 1998 scoring offense (79.8)
- 1998 rebounding (37.4)
- 1998 three-point field goals made (210)
- 2012 scoring defense (58.7)
- 2013 scoring defense (59.1)
- 2014 scoring defense (61.4)
- 2014 field goal percentage defense (.369)
- 2014 blocked shots (6 Avg/G)
- 2014 turnover maring (+3.57)
- 2014 scoring defense (61.4)
- 2015 blocked shots (4.5 Avg/G)
- 2015 field goal percentage defense (.386)
- 2015 steals (305/8.7)
- 2015 turnover margin (+3.31)
- 2016 steals (312/9.5)
- 2016 turnover margin (+3.15)

=== MAC individual statistical champion ===
- 1965 Dave Anderson – free throw percentage (.863)
- 1977 Bill Weaver – free throw percentage (.826)
- 1986 Percy Cooper – assists (182/6.7)
- 1987 Deron Goheen – 3-point field goal percentage (.532)
- 1987 Brad Soucie – 3-point FG made per game (2.48)
- 1987 Mike McCaskill – field goal percentage (.594)
- 1988 Lorenzo Neely – steals (71/2.4)
- 1989 Lorenzo Neely – steals (78/2.7)
- 1989 Brian Nolan – blocked shots (50/2.0)
- 1990 Brian Nolan – blocked shots (49/1.5)
- 1991 Marcus Kennedy – scoring (659/20.0)
- 1991 Carl Thomas – 3-point FG made per game (2.70)
- 1991 Marcus Kennedy – field goal percentage (.682)
- 1993 Theron Wilson – blocked shots (80/2.7)
- 1994 James Reed-assists (140/5.2
- 1995 Early Boykins – assists (136/4.5)
- 1995 Theron Wilson – blocked shots (96/3.2)
- 1998 Earl Boykins – scoring (746/25.7)
- 1998 Earl Boykins – 3-point FG made per game (2.74)
- 2005 Michael Ross – free throw percentage (.854)
- Carlos Medlock – best 3-point field goal percentage (game), 6–6 vs. WMU, 2-15-06
- 2006 John Bowler – scoring (563/20.1)
- 2006 John Bowler – rebounding (301/10.8)
- 2010 Brandon Bowdry – rebounding (319/10.0)
- 2010 Justin Dobbins – field goal percentage (.615)
- 2011 Brandon Bowdry – rebounding (284/9.5)
- 2015 Mike Talley – assist/turnover ratio (2.3)
- 2016 Tim Bond – steals (67/2.0)
- 2016 James Thompson IV – rebounding (352/10.7)
- 2016 James Thompson IV – field goal percentage (.645)

=== MAC tournament records ===
==== Individual single game ====
- 1980 Greg Floyd – field goal pct. (1.000/7-7)
- 1984 Fred Cofield – field goals attempted (28)

==== Individual tournament career ====
- Earl Boykins – field goals made (34)
- Earl Boykins – field goal attempts (60)

==== Team ====
- 1998 field goals made (41 v Toledo)
