= 1913–14 Michigan State Normal Normalites men's basketball team =

American college basketball season

1913–14 Michigan State Normal Normalites men's basketball
- Conference: Independent
- Record: 8–4
- Head coach: LeRoy Brown (2nd season)
- Assistant coach: S.B. Crouse
- Home arena: Gymnasium

The 1913–14 team finished with a record of 8–4. It was the 2nd and last year for head coach LeRoy Brown. The team captain was Elton Rynearson and S.B. Crouse was the manager. The team slogan was "All victories and no defeats". The school yearbook Aurora has the team record 10–4 but has a schedule with only eleven games.

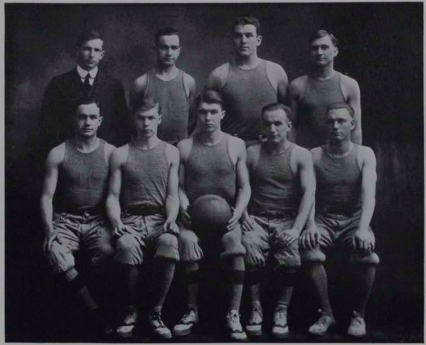
1913-14 EMU Basketball Team Picture

== Roster ==
Number	Name	Position	Class	Hometown
	Herbert Moore	Center	Senior	Toledo, OH
	Elton Rynearson	Guard		Ypsilanti, MI
	Russell Mumford	Guard	Senior	
	Bernard Goodrich	Forward	Senior	Ypsilanti, MI
	Ernest Rynearson	Forward		Ypsilanti, MI
	C. Dale Curtis	Substitute	Senior	Wayne, MI
	Strance	Substitute		

== Schedule ==
Date time, TV	Rank^{#}	Opponent^{#}	Result	Record	Site (attendance) city, state
Non-conference regular season
1914*		Ann Arbor YMCA	W 38-28	1-0	Gymnasium; Ypsilanti, MI
January 17, 1914*		at Polish Seminary	W 40-26	2-0	Orchard Lake Village, MI
January 21, 1914*		Detroit Mercy	W 37-28	3-0	Gymnasium; Ypsilanti, MI
January 24, 1914*		Battle Creek	W 34-28	4-0	Gymnasium; Ypsilanti, MI
January 31, 1914*		at Hillsdale College	W 50-37	5-0	Hillsdale, MI
February 3, 1914*; 8:15		Detroit YMCA	L 16-36	5-1	YMCA Gym; Detroit, MI
February 6, 1914*; 8:00		at Detroit Mercy	L 17-43	5-2	U of D Gym; Detroit, MI
February 11, 1914*		Kalamazoo	L 30-49	5-3	Gymnasium; Ypsilanti, MI
February 14, 1914*		at Albion College	W 31-29	6-3	Albion, MI
February 17, 1914*		Detroit YMCA	L 18-48	6-4	Gymnasium; Ypsilanti, MI
February 11, 1914*		at St. John's (OH)	W 31-25	7-4	Cleveland, Ohio
March 13, 1914*		at Central Michigan	W 38-37	8-4	Central Hall; Mount Pleasant, MI
*Non-conference game. ^{#}Rankings from AP Poll. (#) Tournament seedings in parentheses. All times are in Eastern Time.
