= 1915–16 Michigan State Normal Normalites men's basketball team =

American college basketball season

1915–16 Michigan State Normal Normalites men's basketball
- Conference: Independent
- Record: 10–4
- Head coach: Elmer D. Mitchell (1st season)
- Assistant coach: Thomas S. Clayton
- Home arena: Gymnasium

The 1915–16 team finished with a record of 10–4. It was the 1st year for head coach Elmer D. Mitchell. The team captain was George Mead and Thomas S. Clayton was the manager.

== Roster ==
Number	Name	Position	Class	Hometown
	George Meade		Senior	Ypsilanti, MI
	Frank J. Driesens		Junior	Grand Rapids, MI
	John B. Hartman		Junior	Harbor Springs, MI
	George M. Hurst		Junior	Reese, MI
	Clair Langton		Senior	Ypsilanti, MI
	Morris B. Murray		Senior	East Jordan, MI

== Schedule ==
Date time, TV	Rank^{#}	Opponent^{#}	Result	Record	Site (attendance) city, state
Non-conference regular season
January 8, 1916*		Bowling Green	W 33-15	1-0	Gymnasium; Ypsilanti, MI
January 14, 1916*		Adrian College	L 41-46	1-1	Gymnasium; Ypsilanti, MI
January 1916*		Detroit College of Law	W 30-25	2-1	Gymnasium; Ypsilanti, MI
January 29, 1916*		Ohio Northern	W 20-18	3-1	Gymnasium; Ypsilanti, MI
February 2, 1916*		Alma College	W 21-10	4-1	Gymnasium; Ypsilanti, MI
February 11, 1916*		at Detroit Mercy	L 20-21	4-2	Detroit, MI
February 12, 1916*		Hillsdale College	W 36-21	5-2	Gymnasium; Ypsilanti, MI
February 18, 1916*		at Bowling Green	W 36-22	6-2	Bowling Green, OH
February 19, 1919*		at Detroit College of Law	W 25-17	7-2	Detroit, MI
February 22, 1916*		Polish Seminary	L 11-24	7-3	Gymnasium; Ypsilanti, MI
February 26, 1916*		Battle Creek	W 29-19	8-3	Gymnasium; Ypsilanti, MI
March 3, 1916*		at Central Michigan	L 26-32	8-4	Central Hall; Mount Pleasant, MI
March 1916*		Defiance College	W 33-23	9-4	Gymnasium; Ypsilanti, MI
March 17, 1916*		Detroit Mercy	W 37-25	10-4	Gymnasium; Ypsilanti, MI
*Non-conference game. ^{#}Rankings from AP Poll. (#) Tournament seedings in parentheses. All times are in Eastern Time.

== Game Notes ==
=== January 14, 1916 ===
Adrian list the score as 39-46.
