= 1912–13 Michigan State Normal Normalites men's basketball team =

American college basketball season

1912–13 Michigan State Normal Normalites men's basketball

Michigan Normal Champions
- Conference: Independent
- Record: 6–2
- Head coach: LeRoy Brown (1st season)
- Assistant coach: Russell Mumford
- Home arena: Gymnasium

The 1912–13 team finished with a record of 6–2. It was the 1st year for head coach LeRoy Brown. The team captain and manager was Russell Mumford. The team won the Michigan Normal title by defeating Central Michigan.

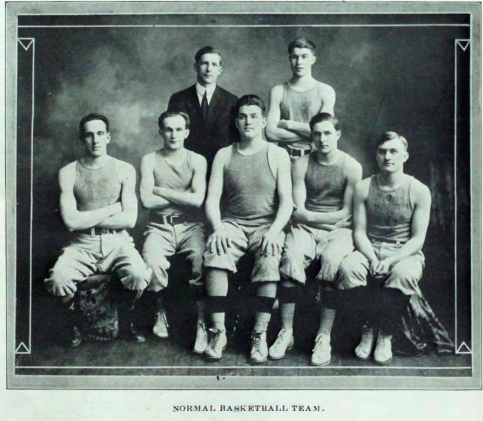
Normal Basketball Team

== Roster ==
Number	Name	Position	Class	Hometown
	Russell Mumford	Guard	Junior	Ypsilanti, MI
	Elton Rynearson	Guard		Ypsilanti, MI
	Herbert Moore	Center	Junior	Toledo, OH
	Bernard Goodrich	Forward	Junior	
	Odo A. Hindelang	Forward	Senior	Detroit, MI
	Edward Millis	Substitute		

== Schedule ==
Date time, TV	Rank^{#}	Opponent^{#}	Result	Record	Site (attendance) city, state
Non-conference regular season
January 11, 1913*		Alumni	W 33-14	1-0	Gymnasium; Ypsilanti, MI
January 17, 1913*		Detroit Mercy	L 27-29	1-1	Gymnasium; Ypsilanti, MI
January 25, 1913*		Polish Seminary	W 40-28	2-1	Gymnasium; Ypsilanti, MI
January 31, 1913*		Hillsdale College	L 17-24	2-2	Gymnasium; Hillsdale, MI
February 1, 1913*		Battle Creek	W 38-25	3-2	Gymnasium; Ypsilanti, MI
February 7, 1913*		Albion College	W 27-21	4-2	Gymnasium; Ypsilanti, MI
February 15, 1913*		St. John's (Toledo, OH)	W 46-38	5-2	Gymnasium; Ypsilanti, MI
February 27, 1913 or March 1, 1913^{1}*		Central Michigan	W 38-20	6-2	Gymnasium; Ypsilanti, MI
*Non-conference game. ^{#}Rankings from AP Poll. (#) Tournament seedings in parentheses. All times are in Eastern Time.

== Game Notes ==
=== January 3, 1913 ===
EMU Media Guide has game on 1/3 in Ypsilanti but the Aurora Yearbook has game on 1/31 in Hillsdale, MI.

=== February 1, 1913 ===
EMU Media Guide has game in Ypsilanti but the Aurora Yearbook has game in Battle Creek, MI.

=== February 7, 1913 ===
EMU Media Guide has game on 2/7 but the Aurora Yearbook has game on 2/8.

=== February 27, 1913 ===
EMU shows list the game being played on 2/27 and CMU list the game on 3/1 with a score of 20-38. The Aurora has the game on 2/28.
