= 1909–10 Michigan State Normal Normalites men's basketball team =

American college basketball season

1909–10 Michigan State Normal Normalites men's basketball
- Conference: Independent
- Record: 10–2
- Head coach: Clare Hunt (1st season)
- Assistant coach: W.P. Bowen
- Home arena: Gymnasium

The 1909–10 team finished with a record of 10–2. It was the 1st year for head coach Clare Hunt. The team captain was Howard McAllister. Former coach W.P. Bowen was the trainer and assistant coach. Howard McAllister was the team captain.

== Roster ==
| Number | Name | Position | Class | Hometown |
|---|---|---|---|---|
| | Edward Richards | Center | | |
| | Milton Mills | Guard | Junior | |
| | Howard McAllister | Guard | Junior | |
| | W.C. McKean | Forward | | |
| | Leonard D'Ooge | Forward | | |
| | Allen Sherzer | Reserve | Senior | Ypsilanti, MI |
| | Heasley | Forward | | |

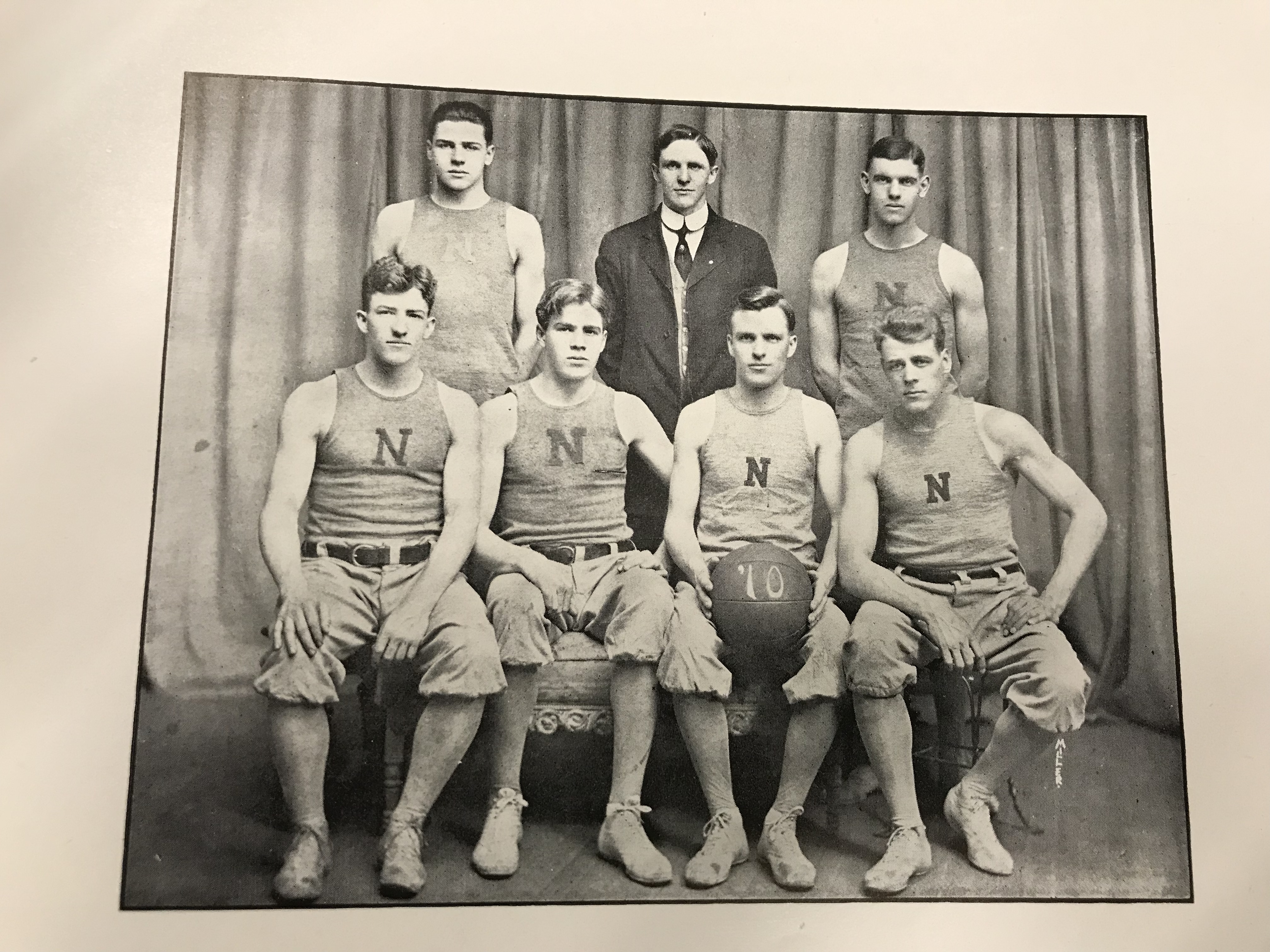
1910 Michigan State Normal College Men's Basketball Team

== Schedule ==
| Date time, TV | Rank^{#} | Opponent^{#} | Result | Record | Site (attendance) city, state |
Non-conference regular season
| January 8, 1910*; 7:30 | | Alumni | W 38-18 | 1-0 | Gymnasium; Ypsilanti, MI |
| January 12, 1910* | | at Ann Arbor YMCA | W 32-20 | 2-0 | Gymnasium; Ann Arbor, MI |
| January 14, 1910*; 9:00 | | Detroit Mercy | W 34-15 | 3-0 | Gymnasium; Ypsilanti, MI |
| January 26, 1910* | | Detroit Mercy | W 26-23 | 4-0 | Gymnasium; Ypsilanti, MI |
| January 28, 1910* | | at Jackson YMCA | L 25-48 | 4-1 | Jackson, MI |
| February 2, 1910* | | Ann Arbor YMCA | W 32-23 | 5-1 | Gymnasium; Ypsilanti, MI |
| February 12, 1910*; 7:30 | | Jackson YMCA | L 30-42 | 5-2 | Gymnasium; Ypsilanti, MI |
| February 16, 1910* | | at Detroit Mercy | W 38-23 | 6-2 | Detroit, MI |
| February 22, 1910* | | Western Michigan | W 42-21 | 7-2 | Gymnasium; Ypsilanti, MI |
| February 25, 1910* | | at Hillsdale | W 47-28 | 8-2 | Gymnasium; Ypsilanti, MI |
| March 4, 1910* | | at Alma | W 32-23 | 9-2 | Alma, MI |
| March 5, 1910* | | at Central Michigan | W 33-21 | 10-2 | Central Hall; Mount Pleasant, MI |
*Non-conference game. ^{#}Rankings from AP Poll. (#) Tournament seedings in parentheses. All times are in Eastern Time.

== Game Notes ==
=== February 12, 1910 ===
Aurora has a score of 38-42.

=== February 16, 1910 ===
Detroit Mercy list the score as 39–24.

=== March 5, 1910 ===
Aurora and CMU have a score of 33-21. EMU Media Guide has 32-21.
