= 1910–11 Michigan State Normal Normalites men's basketball team =

American college basketball season

1910–11 Michigan State Normal Normalites men's basketball
- Conference: Independent
- Record: 4–8
- Head coach: Clare Hunter (2nd season)
- Assistant coaches: Wilbur P. Bowen; Clare Milton
- Home arena: Gymnasium

The 1910–11 team finished with a record of 4–8. It was the 2nd and last year for head coach Clare Hunter. The school yearbook list former coach Wilbur P. Bowen as the head coach. The team captain was L. Hindelang and Clare Milton was the manager.

== Roster ==
Number	Name	Position	Class	Hometown
	Leonard D'Ooge	Center		
	R. Rynearson	Guard		
	L. Mumford	Guard		
	R. Paddock	Forward		
	L. Hindelang	Forward		
	George P. Becker	Reserve	Junior	

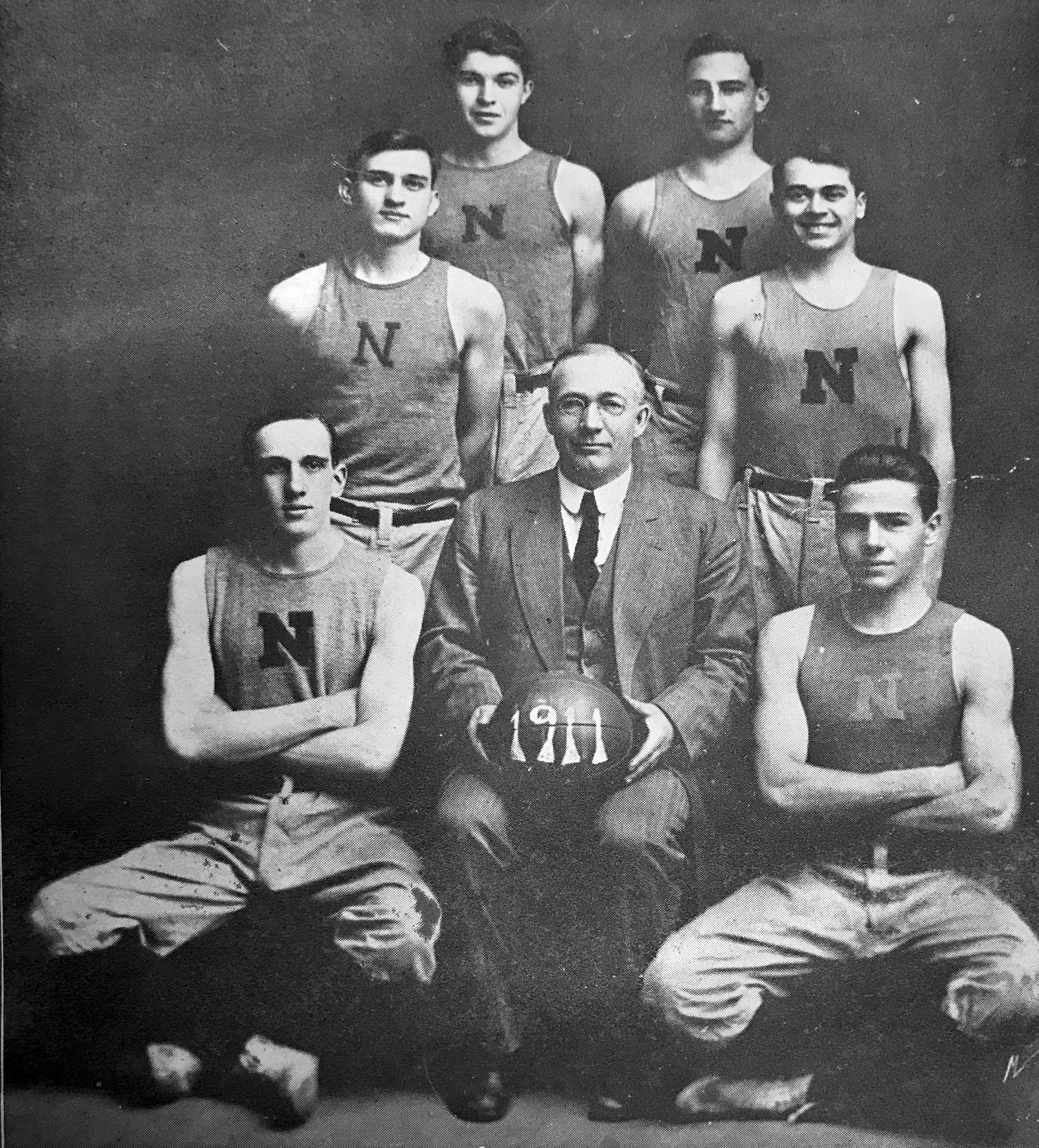
1911 Michigan State Normal College Men's Basketball

== Schedule ==
Date time, TV	Rank^{#}	Opponent^{#}	Result	Record	Site (attendance) city, state
Non-conference regular season
January 14, 1911*		at Detroit Central	L 22-45	0-1	(350); Detroit, MI
January 18, 1911*		Detroit Mercy	L 20-52	0-2	Gymnasium; Ypsilanti, MI
February 3, 1911*		at Alma	L 23-32	0-3	Gymnasium; Ypsilanti, MI
February 6, 1911*		Ann Arbor YMCA	L 33-46	0-4	Gymnasium; Ypsilanti, MI
February 10, 1911*		Hillsdale College	L 25-31	0-5	Gymnasium; Ypsilanti, MI
February 11, 1911*		Trine	W 33-18	1-5	Gymnasium; Ypsilanti, MI
February 18, 1911*		at Detroit Mercy	L 32-71	1-6	Detroit, MI
February 22, 1911*		Central Michigan	L 32-35	1-7	Gymnasium; Ypsilanti, MI
February 25, 1911*		Andrews University	W 38-20	2-7	Gymnasium; Ypsilanti, MI
March 2, 1911*		Adrian College	L 30-33	2-8	Gymnasium; Ypsilanti, MI
March 2, 1911*		Olivet College	W 34-32	3-8	Gymnasium; Ypsilanti, MI
March 11, 1911*		at Andrew University	W 36-32	4-8	Berrien Springs, MI
*Non-conference game. ^{#}Rankings from AP Poll. (#) Tournament seedings in parentheses. All times are in Eastern Time.

== Game Notes ==
=== January 18, 1911 ===
Aurora list score of 24–52.

=== February 18, 1911 ===
Aurora list score of 32–68.

=== February 25, 1911 ===
Aurora list score of 36–32.

=== March 2, 1911 (Olivet) ===
EMU Media Guide has the date of 3/2, Olivet Media Guide has the date of 3/3 and the Aurora has the date of 3/4.

=== March 11, 1911 ===
Aurora list date of 3/12.
