= 1906–07 Michigan State Normal Normalites men's basketball team =

American college basketball season

1906–07 Michigan State Normal Normalites men's basketball
- Conference: Independent
- Record: 2–8
- Head coach: Wilbur P. Bowen (4th season)
- Assistant coach: E.A. Stewart
- Home arena: Gymnasium

The 1906–07 team finished with a record of 2–8. It was the fourth year for head coach Wilbur P. Bowen. The team captain was C.P. Steimle and the team manager was E.A. Stewart.

== Roster ==
Number	Name	Position	Class	Hometown
	W.L. Walling	Center		
	Clemens P. Steimle	Guard	Senior	Atlantic Mine, MI
	Ronald Chapman	Guard	Junior	Rockford, MI
	Archie Johnson	Forward		
	Ed Steimle	Forward		
	Dan Salisbury	Forward		

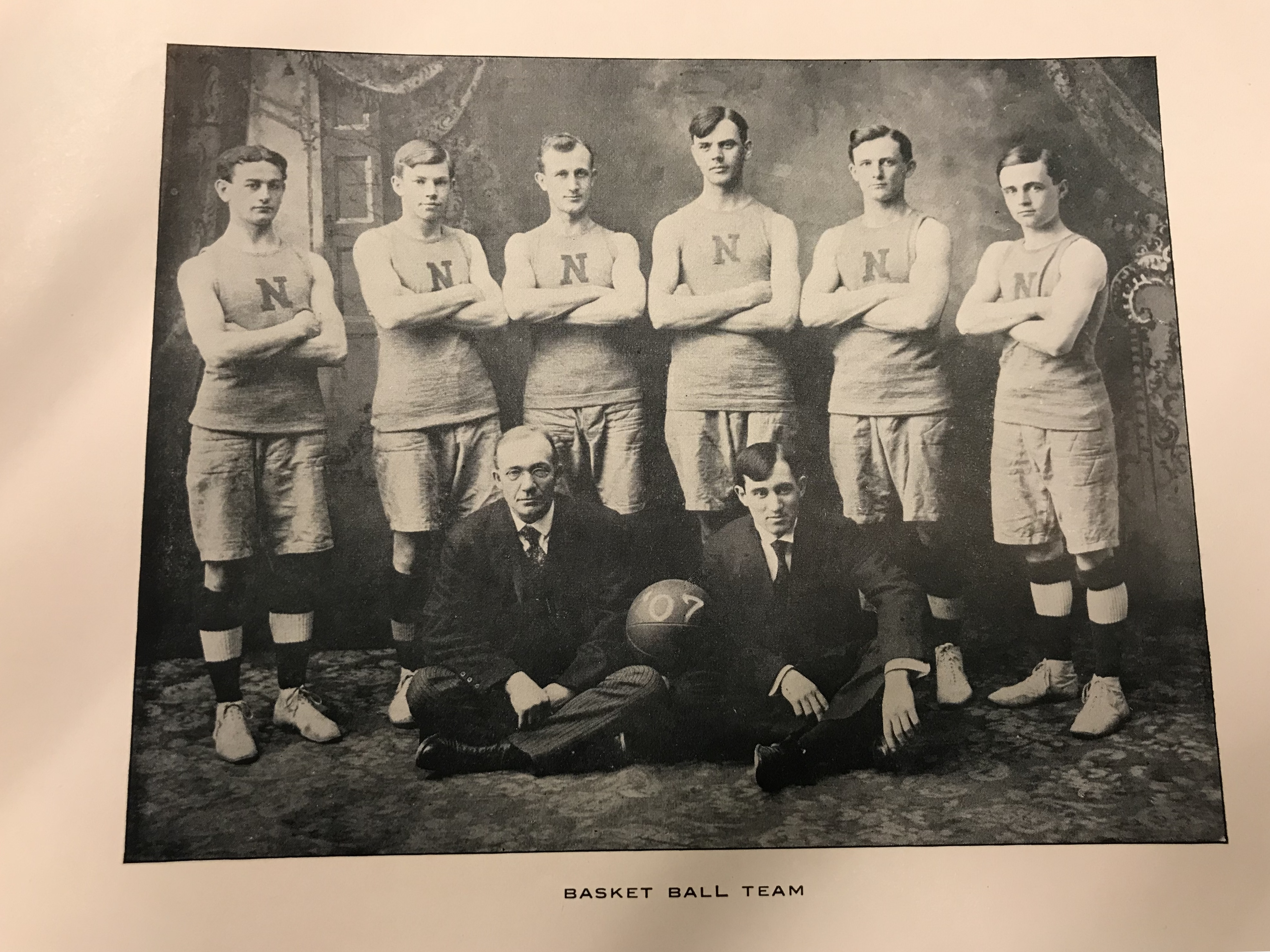
1907 Michigan State Normal College Men's Basketball Team

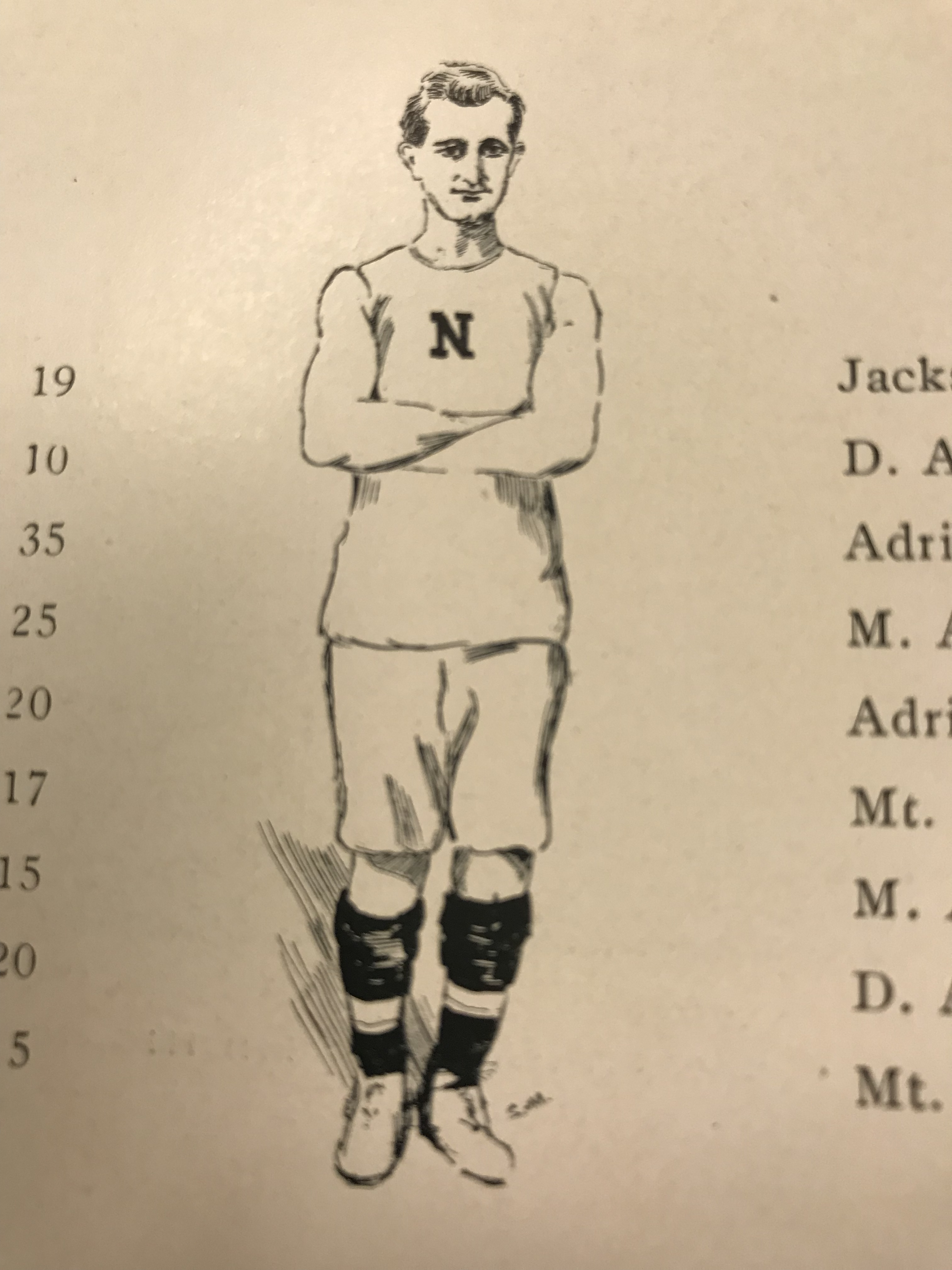
1907 Drawing of Michigan State Normal College Basketball Player

== Schedule ==
Date time, TV	Rank^{#}	Opponent^{#}	Result	Record	Site (attendance) city, state
Non-conference regular season
January 5, 1907*		Jackson YMCA	L 14-25	0-1	Gymnasium; Ypsilanti, MI
January 18, 1907*		at Detroit AC	L 10-54	0-2	Detroit, MI
January 22, 1907*		at Adrian College	W 35-21	1-2	Adrian, MI
January 29, 1907*		Michigan State	L 25-50	1-3	Gymnasium (600); Ypsilanti, MI
February 15, 1907*		at Jackson YMCA	L 19-24	1-4	Jackson, MI
February 13, 1907*		Central Michigan	W 17-13	2-4	Gymnasium; Ypsilanti, MI
March 2, 1907*		at Michigan State	L 13-72	2-5	Armory; East Lansing, MI
March 9, 1907*		Detroit AC	L 20-52	2-6	Gymnasium; Ypsilanti, MI
March 15, 1907*		at Central Michigan	L 16-52	2-7	Mount Pleasant, MI
March 15, 1907*		at Adrian College	L 20-40	2-8	Adrian, MI
*Non-conference game. ^{#}Rankings from AP Poll. (#) Tournament seedings in parentheses. All times are in Eastern Time.
