= 1901–02 Michigan State Normal Normalites men's basketball team =

American college basketball season

1901–02 Michigan State Normal Normalites men's basketball
- Conference: Independent
- Record: 1–0
- Head coach: Clayton T. Teetzel (1st season)
- Assistant coach: W.A. Whitney
- Home arena: Gymnasium

The 1901–02 team went 1–0 the first and only undefeated season in school history. It was the first year for head coach Clayton T. Teetzel. The team captain was C.H. Ireland and the team manager was W.A. Whitney. R.C. Smith was elected captain for the following season's team.

== Roster ==
Number	Name	Position	Class	Hometown
	Carey H. Ireland	Forward	Senior	Berrien Springs, MI
	Charles M. Novack	Forward		
	Latham	Forward		
	Robert C. Smith	Center	Junior	Bath, MI
	M.B. Huston	Guard		
	B.A. Barnes	Guard		
	John P. Faucher	Guard	Sophomore	Ward, MI
	Ericson	Guard		
	Fred Belland		Junior	
	Charles Salsbury			
	Eber A. Burke			Willow, MI
	Miller			
	Morae	Forward		
	Edward O'Brien		Sophomore	

1902 Michigan State Normal College Men's Basketball Team

== Schedule ==
EMU Media Guide has Detroit YMCA and the Detroit Free Press has Detroit College of Medicine.

Date time, TV	Rank^{#}	Opponent^{#}	Result	Record	Site (attendance) city, state
Non-conference regular season
1902*		Albion College			
1902*		Hillsdale College			
March 1, 1902*		Detroit YMCA			Gymnasium; Ypsilanti, MI
March 15, 1902*		Detroit College of Medicine	W 11-8	1-0	Gymnasium; Ypsilanti, MI
*Non-conference game. ^{#}Rankings from AP Poll. (#) Tournament seedings in parentheses. All times are in Eastern Time.

=== Game Notes ===
==== March 15, 1902 ====
EMU Media Guide has the game being played against the Detroit YMCA. Both the Normal College News and Detroit Free Press have it against the Detroit College of Medicine. Novak, Ireland, Smith, Huston, and Barnes started for the Normalites.
