= 1908–09 Michigan State Normal Normalites men's basketball team =

American college basketball season

1908–09 Michigan State Normal Normalites men's basketball
- Conference: Independent
- Record: 6–5
- Head coach: Wilbur P. Bowen (6th season)
- Assistant coach: Earl Babcock
- Home arena: Gymnasium

The 1908–09 team finished with a record of 6–5. It was the sixth and final year for head coach Wilbur P. Bowen. The team captain was Frank Head. Earl Babcock was the team manager.

== Roster ==
| Number | Name | Position | Class | Hometown |
|---|---|---|---|---|
| | Frank Head | Center | | |
| | Brice Miller | Guard | | |
| | Howard B. McAllister | Guard | Sophomore | |
| | Fred Currier | Forward | | |
| | Leroy Stevens | Forward | Graduate Student | Oxford, MI |
| | Edgar Mumford | Forward | | |

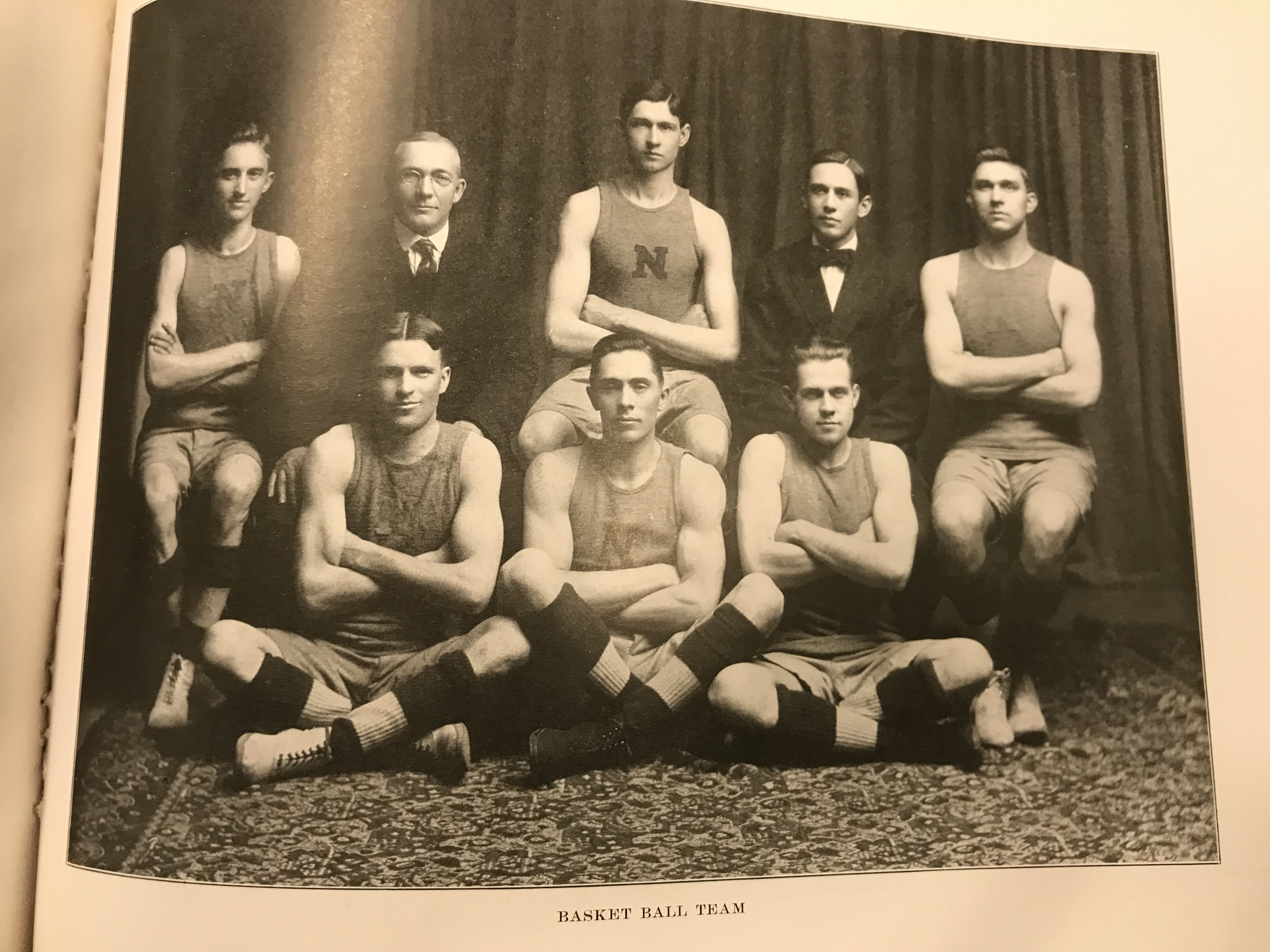
1909 Michigan State Normal College Men's Basketball Team

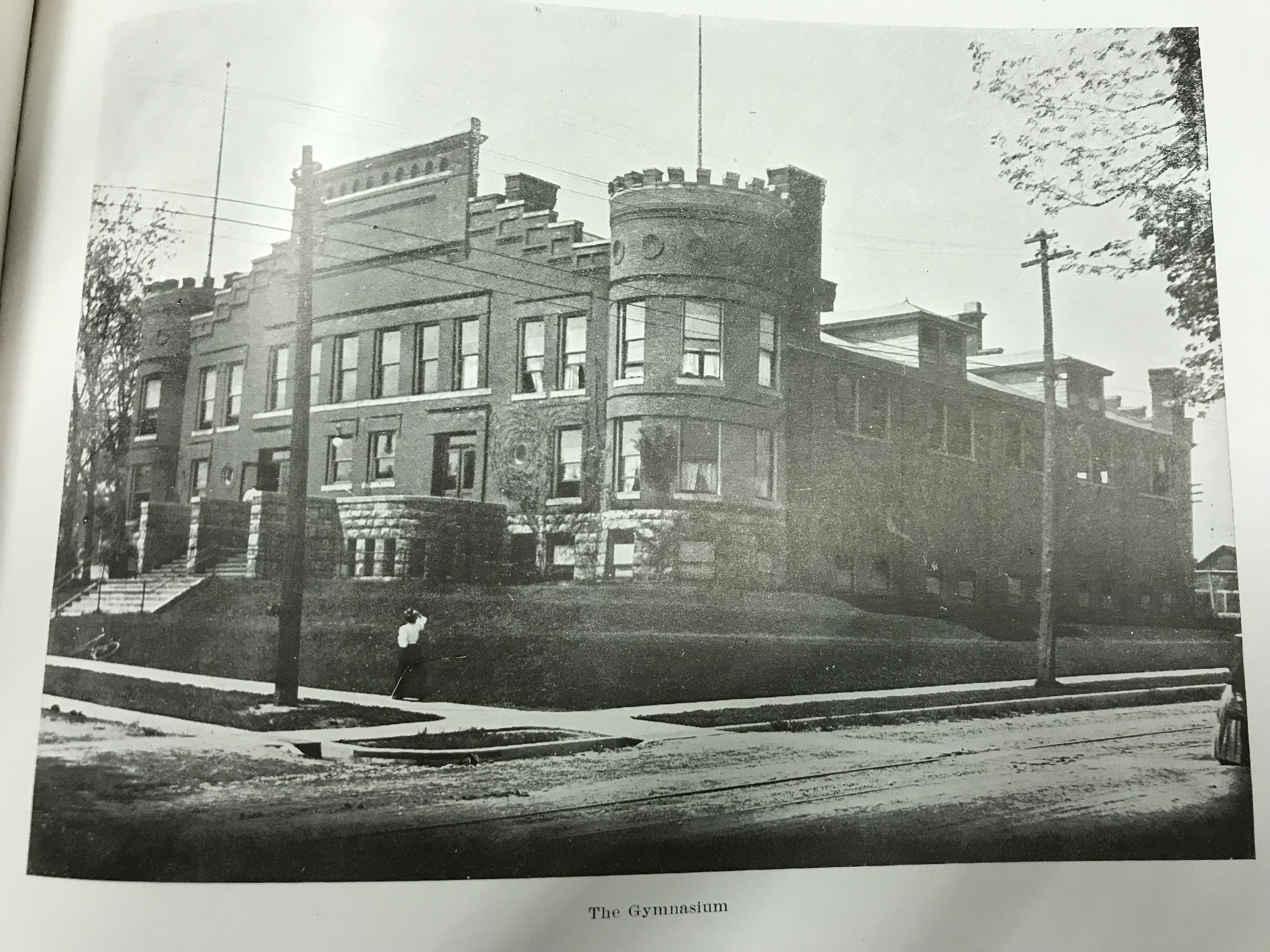
1909 Michigan State Normal College Gymnasium

== Schedule ==
| Date time, TV | Rank^{#} | Opponent^{#} | Result | Record | Site (attendance) city, state |
Non-conference regular season
| January 9, 1909* | | Ann Arbor | W 28-12 | 1-0 | Gymnasium; Ypsilanti, MI |
| January 16, 1909* | | Michigan School for the Deaf | W 68-23 or 67-23^{1} | 2-0 | Gymnasium; Ypsilanti, MI |
| January 1909* | | at Michigan School for the Deaf | L 28-32 | 2-1 | Lansing, MI |
| January 30, 1909* | | Ann Arbor Independent | W 47-17 | 3-1 | Gymnasium; Ypsilanti, MI |
| February 1908* | | at Alma | L 28-40 | 3-2 | Alma, MI |
| February 6, 1909* | | at Central Michigan | L 16-32 | 3-3 | Mount Pleasant, MI |
| February 16, 1909* | | Jackson YMCA | L 20-40 | 3-4 | Jackson, MI |
| February 19, 1909* | | at Detroit Mercy | L 6-46 | 3-5 | D.U.S. Gym; Detroit, MI |
| March 6, 1909* | | at Central Michigan | W 20-19^{2} | 4-5 | Gymnasium; Ypsilanti, MI |
| 1909* | | St. John's AC | W 32-23 | 5-5 | Gymnasium; Ypsilanti, MI |
| 1909* | | St. John's AC | W 45-21 | 6-5 | Gymnasium; Ypsilanti, MI |
*Non-conference game. ^{#}Rankings from AP Poll. (#) Tournament seedings in parentheses. All times are in Eastern Time.

1. Media guide shows score of 68-23 and yearbook shows 67–23.

2. Both EMU & CMU list this game as a win.
