= 1946–47 Michigan State Normal Hurons men's basketball team =

American college basketball season

1946–47 Michigan State Normal Normalites men's basketball

Central Michigan Tournament/Midwest College Invitational Champions
- Conference: Independent
- Record: 9–9
- Head coach: Ray Stites (1st season)
- Home arena: Gymnasium

The 1946–47 Michigan State Normal Normalites men's basketball team represented the Michigan State Normal School, now Eastern Michigan University, in the 1946–47 NCAA men's basketball season. The team finished with a record of 9–9. The team was the champions of the inaugural Central Michigan Tournament Champs/Midwest College Invitational. The team was led by first year head coach Ray Stites. Charles Sampier was the team captain and leading scorer.

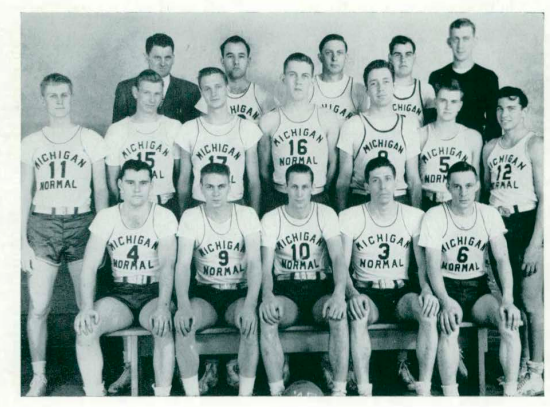
1946-47 EMU Basketball team picture

== Roster ==
Number	Name	Position	Class	Hometown
	Charles Sampier		Senior	Milan, MI
	Howard Messenger	Center	Senior	Vernon, MI
	Dick Guenther			
	Vern Sherman		Junior	Saginaw, MI
	Len Sweet			
	Jim Michel			
	Bill Cave		Junior	
	Bob Geddes		Sophomore	Ypsilanti, MI
	Roy Weir			
	Bob Bentley			
	Bob Moffett		Sophomore	Ypsilanti, MI
	Jim Powers			
	Clare Ebersole		Sophomore	Plymouth, MI
	Reinhardt Heininger			
	Warren Piche		Senior	Grosse Pointe, MI

== Schedule ==
Date time, TV	Opponent	Result	Record	Site (attendance) city, state
Non-conference regular season
1946*	Alumni	W 39–36	1–0	Gymnasium; Ypsilanti, MI
November 21, 1946*	Percy Jones Hospital	W 56–31	2–0	Gymnasium; Ypsilanti, MI
December 5, 1946*	Central Michigan	L 46–58	2–1	Gymnasium; Ypsilanti, MI
December 14, 1946*	Western Ontario	W 51–49	3–1	Gymnasium; Ypsilanti, MI
December 19, 1946*	at Hope	L 33–69	3–2	Holland, MI
January 3, 1947*	vs. Illinois State; Central Michigan Tournament	W 60–43	4–2	Mount Pleasant, MI
January 4, 1947*	at Central Michigan; Central Michigan Tournament	W 48–47	5–2	Mount Pleasant, MI
January 7, 1947*	at Percy Jones Hospital	W 53–36	6–2	Battle Creek, MI
January 10, 1947*	at Western Ontario	W 47–40	7–2	London, Ontario
January 17, 1947*	Albion	L 52–61	7–3	Gymnasium; Ypsilanti, MI
January 23, 1947*	Central Michigan	L 33–48	7–4	Gymnasium; Ypsilanti, MI
January 25, 1947*	Hope	L 42–49	7–5	Gymnasium; Ypsilanti, MI
January 27, 1947*	at St. Mary's	W 56–45	8–5	Orchard Lake Village, MI
January 31, 1947*	at Detroit Mercy	L 47–73	8–6	Gymnasium; Ypsilanti, MI
February 9, 1947*	at Ball State	L 32–73	8–7	Muncie, IN
February 13, 1947*	St. Mary's	W 69–48	9–7	Gymnasium; Ypsilanti, MI
February 15, 1947*	at Detroit	L 49–62	9–8	Detroit, MI
February 17, 1947*	at Albion	L 43–59	9–9	Albion, MI
*Non-conference game. (#) Tournament seedings in parentheses. All times are in Eastern Time.

== Game Notes ==
=== January 3, 1947 ===
The Aurora list the opponent as Northern Illinois. The Media Guide has Illinois State.

=== January 10, 1947 ===
The Aurora has a score of 40–47, while the Media Guide has 47–40.

=== February 9, 1947 ===
The Aurora has a score of 42–73, while the Media Guide has 32–73.
