= 1911–12 Michigan State Normal Normalites men's basketball team =

American college basketball season

1911–12 Michigan State Normal Normalites men's basketball
- Conference: Independent
- Record: 3–8
- Head coach: Frederick Beyerman (1st season)
- Assistant coach: John T. Symons
- Home arena: Gymnasium

The 1911–12 team finished with a record of 3–8. It was the 1st and only year for head coach Frederick Beyerman. The team captain was L. Hindelang and the captain elect was Mumford. John T. Symons was the manager.

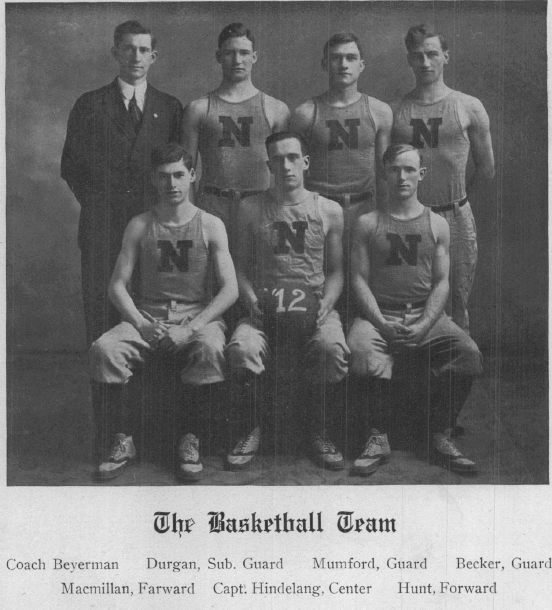
The Basketball Team

== Roster ==
Number	Name	Position	Class	Hometown
	Guy A. Durgan	Guard	Senior	Columbiaville, MI
	L. Mumford	Guard		
	George P. Becker	Guard	Senior	
	Macmillan	Forward		
	L. Hindelang	Center		
	Hunt	Forward		
	John J. Schafer		Senior	Stephenson, MI

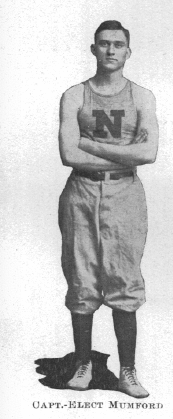
Capt.-Elect Mumford

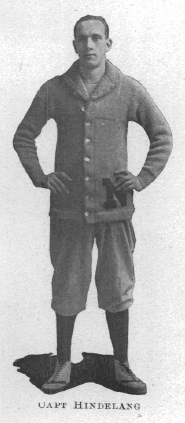
Capt Hindelang

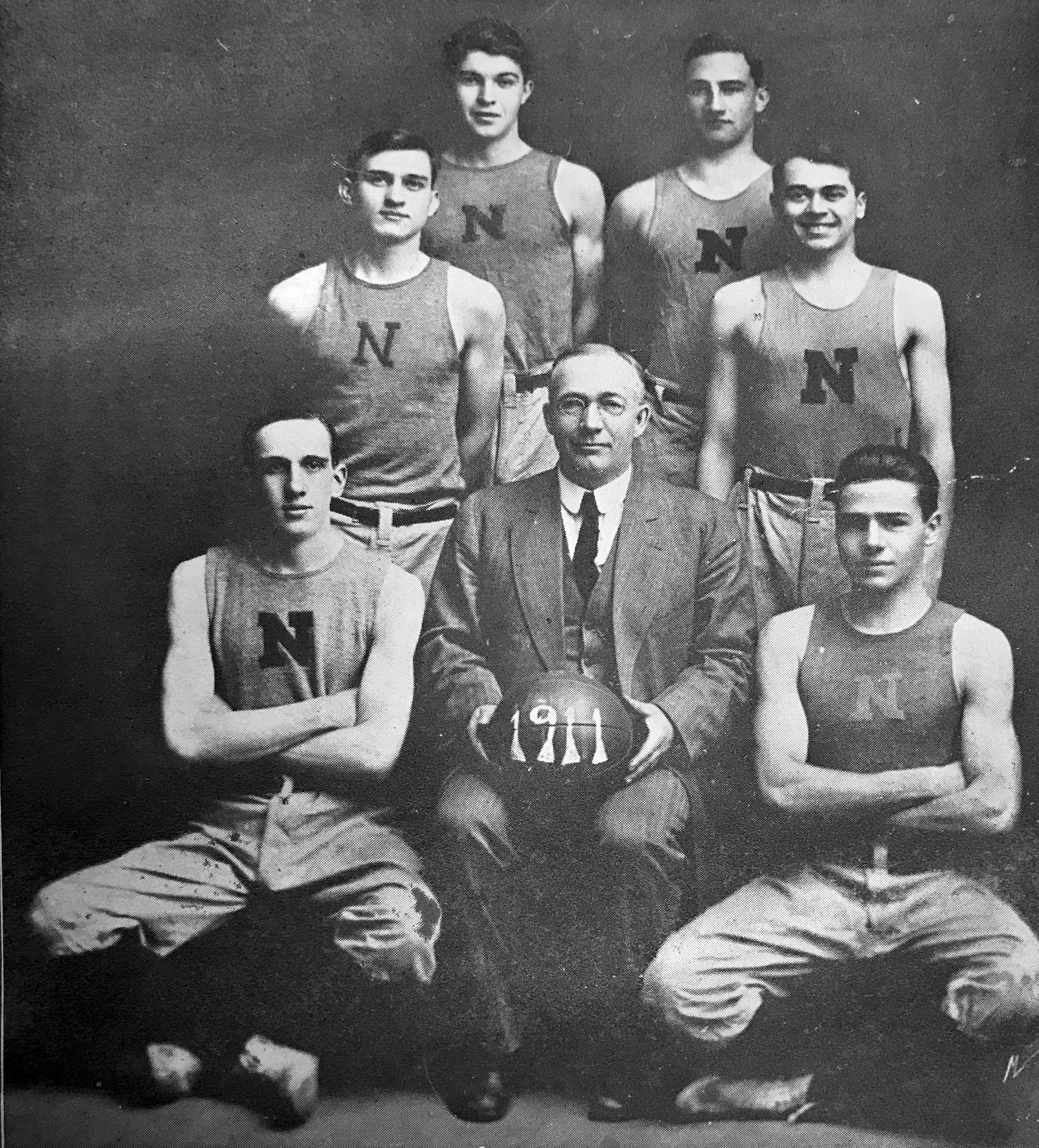
1911 Michigan State Normal College Men's Basketball

== Schedule ==
Date time, TV	Rank^{#}	Opponent^{#}	Result	Record	Site (attendance) city, state
Non–conference regular season
December 13, 1911*		A.A. Crescents	W 32–25	1–0	Gymnasium; Ypsilanti, MI
January 6, 1912*		Albion College	W 33–29	2–0	Gymnasium; Ypsilanti, MI
January 11, 1912*		Battle Creek School for Physical Education	L 11–52	2–1	Gymnasium; Ypsilanti, MI
January 13, 1912*		at Detroit Central	L 23–24	2–2	Detroit, MI
January 20, 1912*		at Central Michigan	L 19–39	2–3	Central Hall; Mount Pleasant, MI
January 26, 1912*		Detroit Mercy	L 16–62	2–4	D.U.S. Gym; Detroit, MI
February 3, 1912*		at Battle Creek	L 26–48	2–5	Battle Creek, MI
February 10, 1912*		Hillsdale College	L 25–32	2–6	Gymnasium; Ypsilanti, MI
February 19, 1912*		Alma	L 15–35	2–7	Gymnasium; Ypsilanti, MI
February 24, 1912*		Detroit Mercy	L 26–52	2–8	Gymnasium; Ypsilanti, MI
March 2, 1912*		Adrian College	W 19–17	3–8	Gymnasium; Ypsilanti, MI
*Non-conference game. ^{#}Rankings from AP Poll. (#) Tournament seedings in parentheses. All times are in Eastern Time.

== Game Notes ==
=== January 11, 1912 ===
Aurora has 1/13.

=== January 13, 1912 ===
Aurora has 1/20.

=== January 20, 1912 ===
EMU Media Guide has 1/20, Aurora has 2/20 and CMU shows 1/19.

=== February 19, 1912 ===
Aurora has game in Alma, MI.

=== February 24, 1912 ===
UDM has a score of 8-47.

=== March 2, 1912 ===
Aurora has a score of 23-21.
