= 1907–08 Michigan State Normal Normalites men's basketball team =

American college basketball season

1907–08 Michigan State Normal Normalites men's basketball

Michigan Normal Champions
- Conference: Independent
- Record: 3–5
- Head coach: Wilbur P. Bowen (5th season)
- Assistant coach: Leroy Stevens
- Home arena: Gymnasium

The 1907–08 Michigan State Normal Normalites men's basketball team finished with a record of 3–5. It was the fifth year for head coach Wilbur P. Bowen. The team captain was Roland Chapman. The team manager was Leroy Stevens. The team closed "its season by defeating Mt. Pleasant and thereby winning the Normal championship of the state."

== Roster ==
Number	Name	Position	Class	Hometown
	Ashley P. Merrill	Center	Senior	Algonac, MI
	Roland Chapman	Guard	Senior	Rockford, MI
	Charles A. Webster	Guard	Senior	Metamora, MI
	Frank Head	Forward		
	Leroy Stevens	Forward	Senior	Oxford, MI

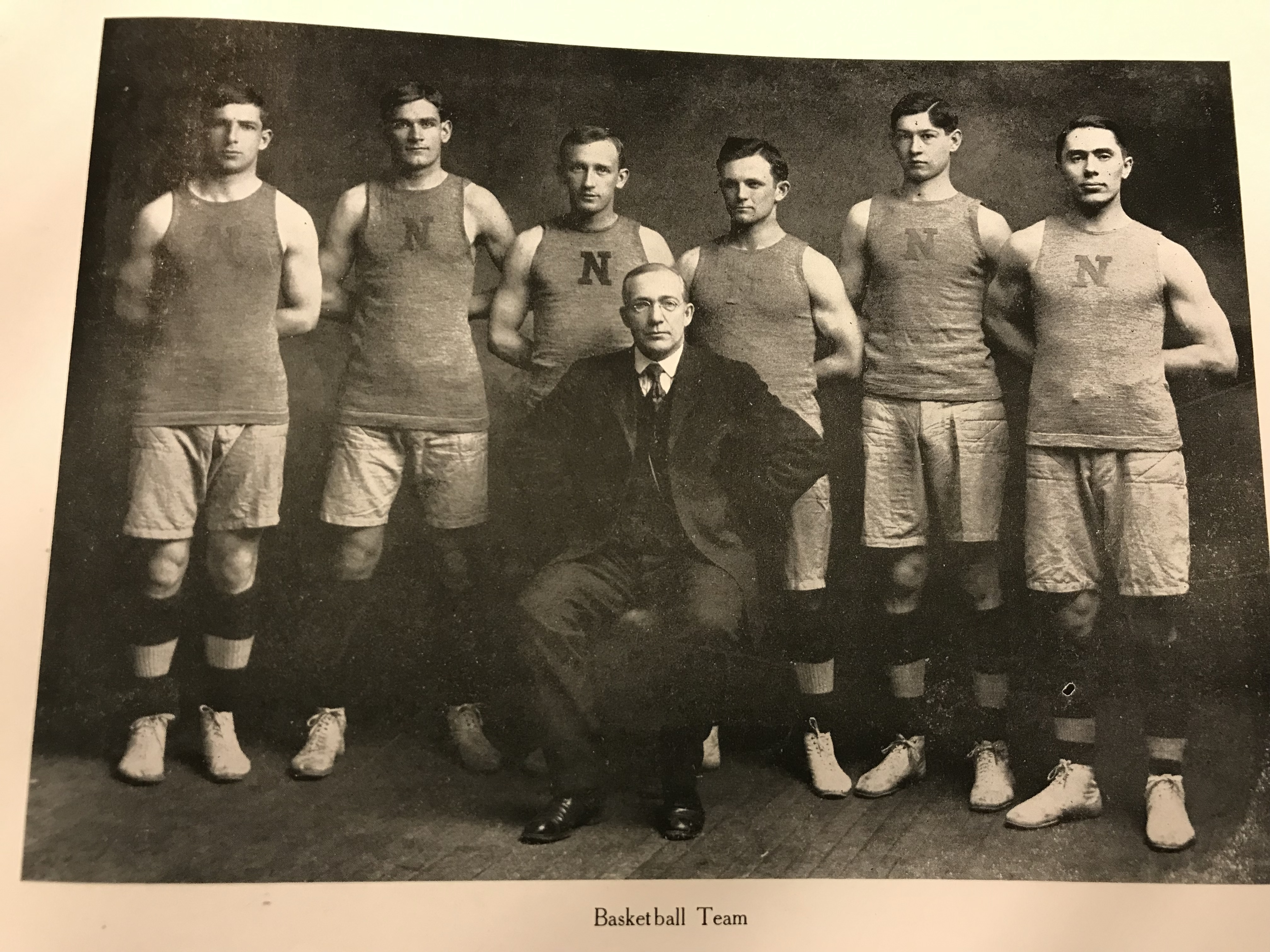
1908 Michigan State Normal College Men's Basketball Team

== Schedule ==
Date time, TV	Rank^{#}	Opponent^{#}	Result	Record	Site (attendance) city, state
Non-conference regular season
January 11, 1908*		Temple AC	L 21-24	0-1	Gymnasium; Ypsilanti, MI
January 17, 1908*		at Jackson YMCA	L 15-45	0-2	Jackson, MI
January 25, 1908*		at Detroit Mercy	W 35-27	1-2	Franklin Gym (500); Detroit, MI
February 1, 1908*		Detroit Independents	L 8-58	1-3	Gymnasium; Ypsilanti, MI
February 8, 1908*		at Detroit Mercy	W 38-21	2-3	Gymnasium; Ypsilanti, MI
February 22, 1908*		Burroughs-Detroit	L 12-41	2-4	Gymnasium; Ypsilanti, MI
February 29, 1908*		Jackson YMCA	L 18-29	2-5	Gymnasium; Ypsilanti, MI
March 7, 1908*		Central Michigan	W 30-28	3-5	Gymnasium; Ypsilanti, MI
*Non-conference game. ^{#}Rankings from AP Poll. (#) Tournament seedings in parentheses. All times are in Eastern Time.
