= 1898–99 Michigan State Normal Normalites men's basketball team =

American college basketball season

1898–99 Michigan State Normal Normalites men's basketball
- Conference: Independent
- Record: 1–1
- Head coach: Ernest E. Crook (1st season)
- Assistant coach: Dan Kimball
- Home arena: Gymnasium

1898–99 was the second year of basketball at Michigan State Normal School. Both games were played at home against Albion College in Ypsilanti, Michigan. Michigan State Normal School ended up splitting the games and finished 1–1. The team captain was H.W. Conklin.

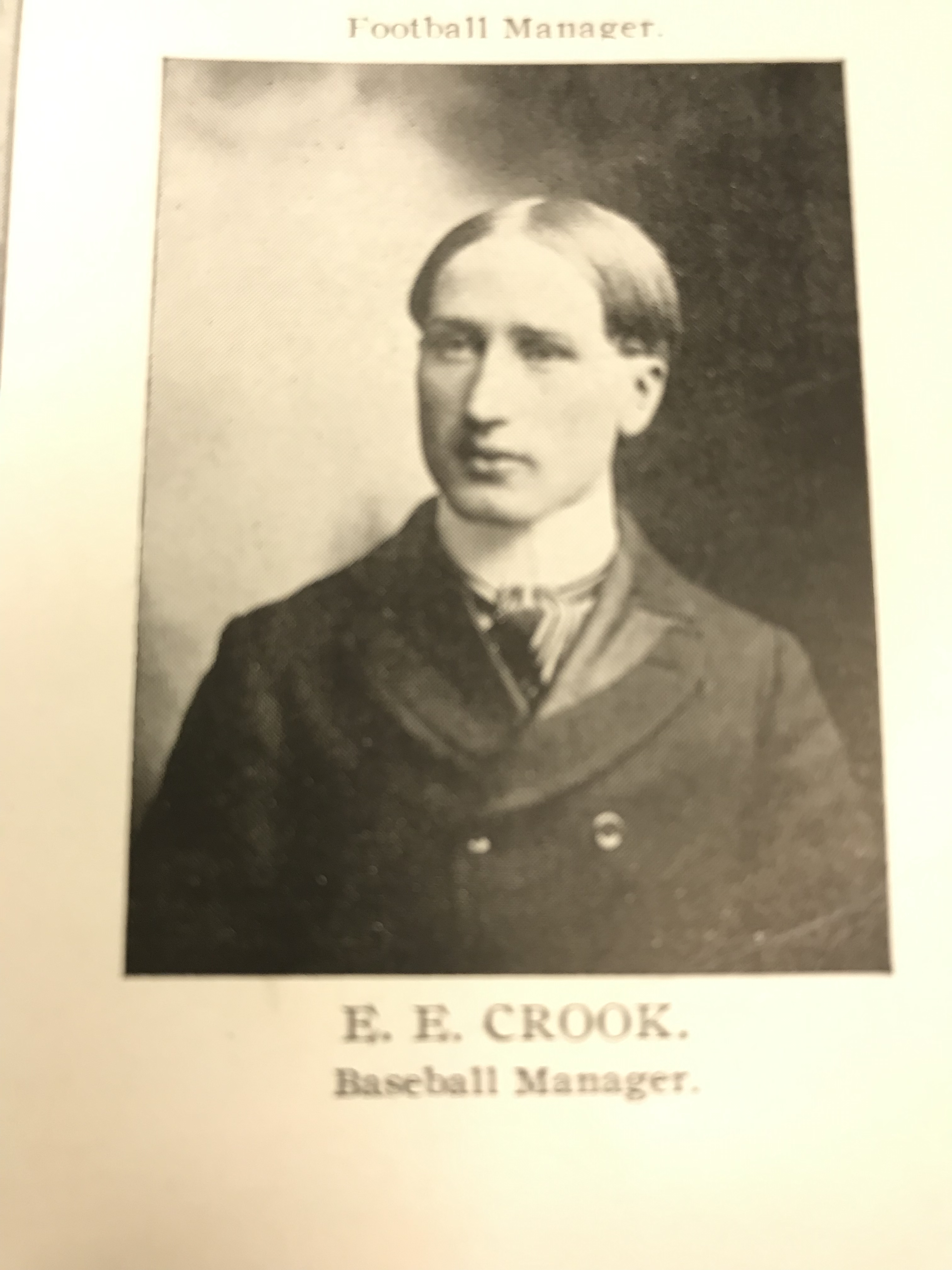
E.E. Crook 1899 Michigan State Normal College Men's Basketball Head Coach

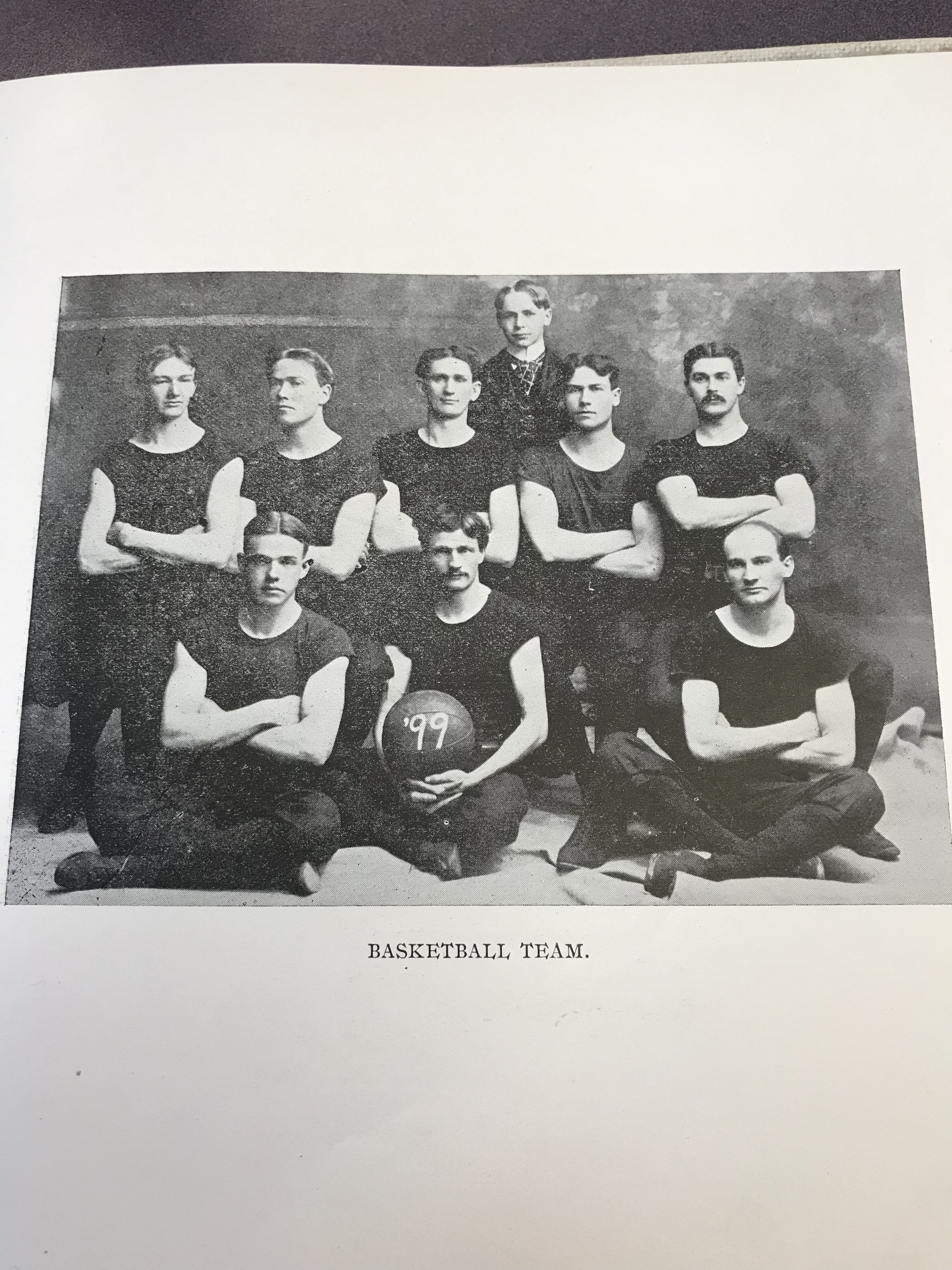
1899 Michigan State Normal College Men's Basketball

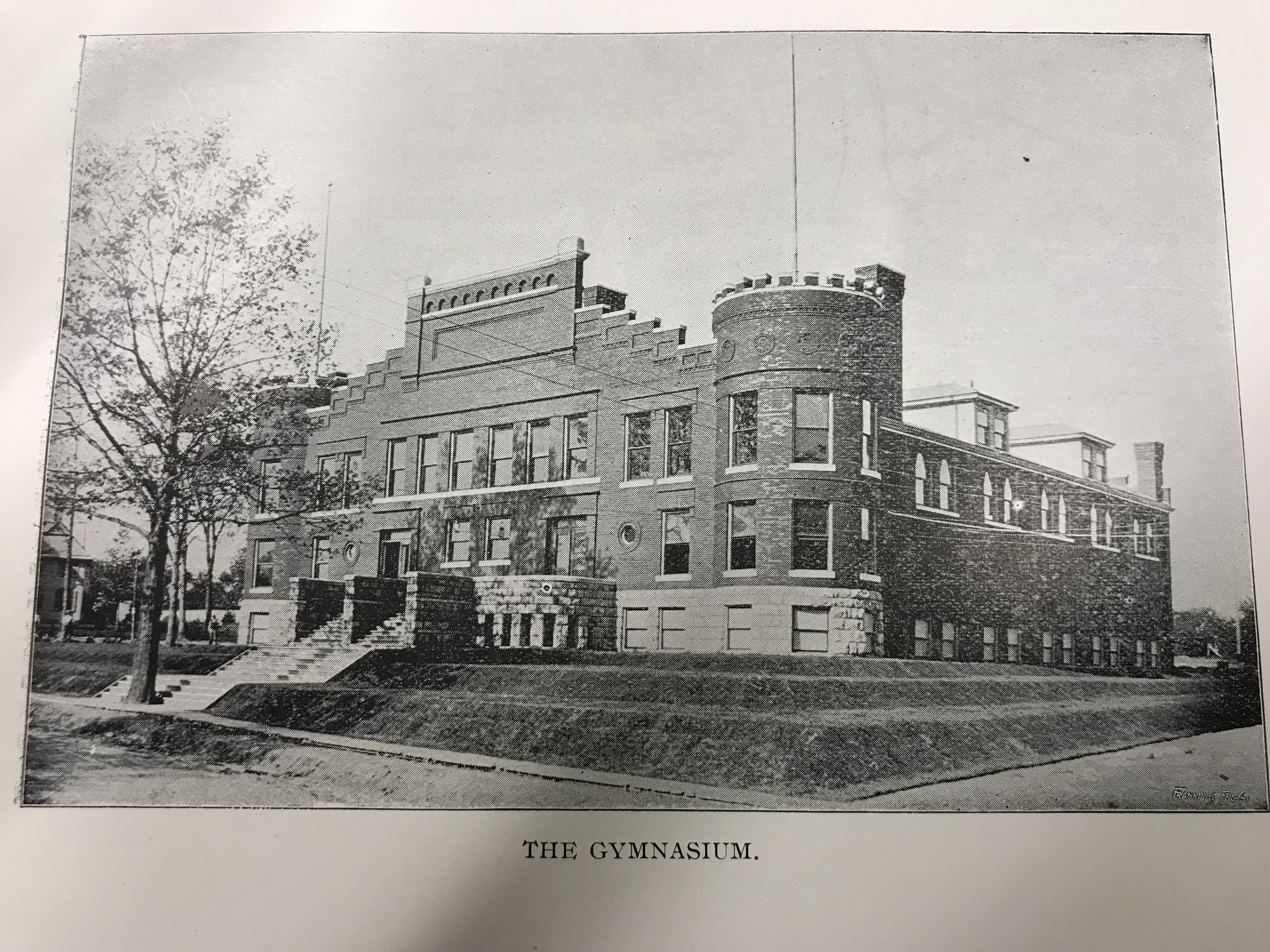
1899 Michigan State Normal College Gymnasium

== Roster ==
Number	Name	Position	Class	Hometown	Games Played
	Hugh W. Conklin		Junior	Owosso, MI	1
	Fred Q. Gorten	Center	Junior	Ypsilanti, MI	1
	Earl Reid	Guard	Junior	Alpine, MI	1

== Schedule ==
Date time, TV	Rank^{#}	Opponent^{#}	Result	Record	Site (attendance) city, state
Non–conference regular season
February 4, 1899*; 3:27		at Albion	L 9-37	0-1	Albion, MI
February 25, 1899*; 8:00		Albion	W 51-24	1–1	Gymnasium; Ypsilanti, MI
*Non-conference game. ^{#}Rankings from AP Poll. (#) Tournament seedings in parentheses. All times are in Eastern Time.
