= 1905–06 Michigan State Normal Normalites men's basketball team =

American college basketball season

1905–06 Michigan State Normal Normalites men's basketball
- Conference: Independent
- Record: 4–4
- Head coach: Wilbur P. Bowen (3rd season)
- Assistant coach: Herbert Chapman
- Home arena: Gymnasium

The 1905–06 team finished with a record 4–4. It was the third year for head coach Wilbur P. Bowen. The team captain was Roy S. Sprague and Herbert Chapman was the team manager.

== Roster ==
Number	Name	Position	Class	Hometown
	Roy S. Head	Center	Senior	Milan, MI
	Clemens P. Steimle	Guard	Junior	Atlantic Mine, MI
	Charles A. Webster	Guard	Senior	Metamora, MI
	Roy S. Sprague	Forward	Graduate Student	Farmington, MI
	James L. Morris	Forward		
	Leo F. Long	Forward	Senior	Tekonsha, MI
	Elmer S. Gilman	Forward		

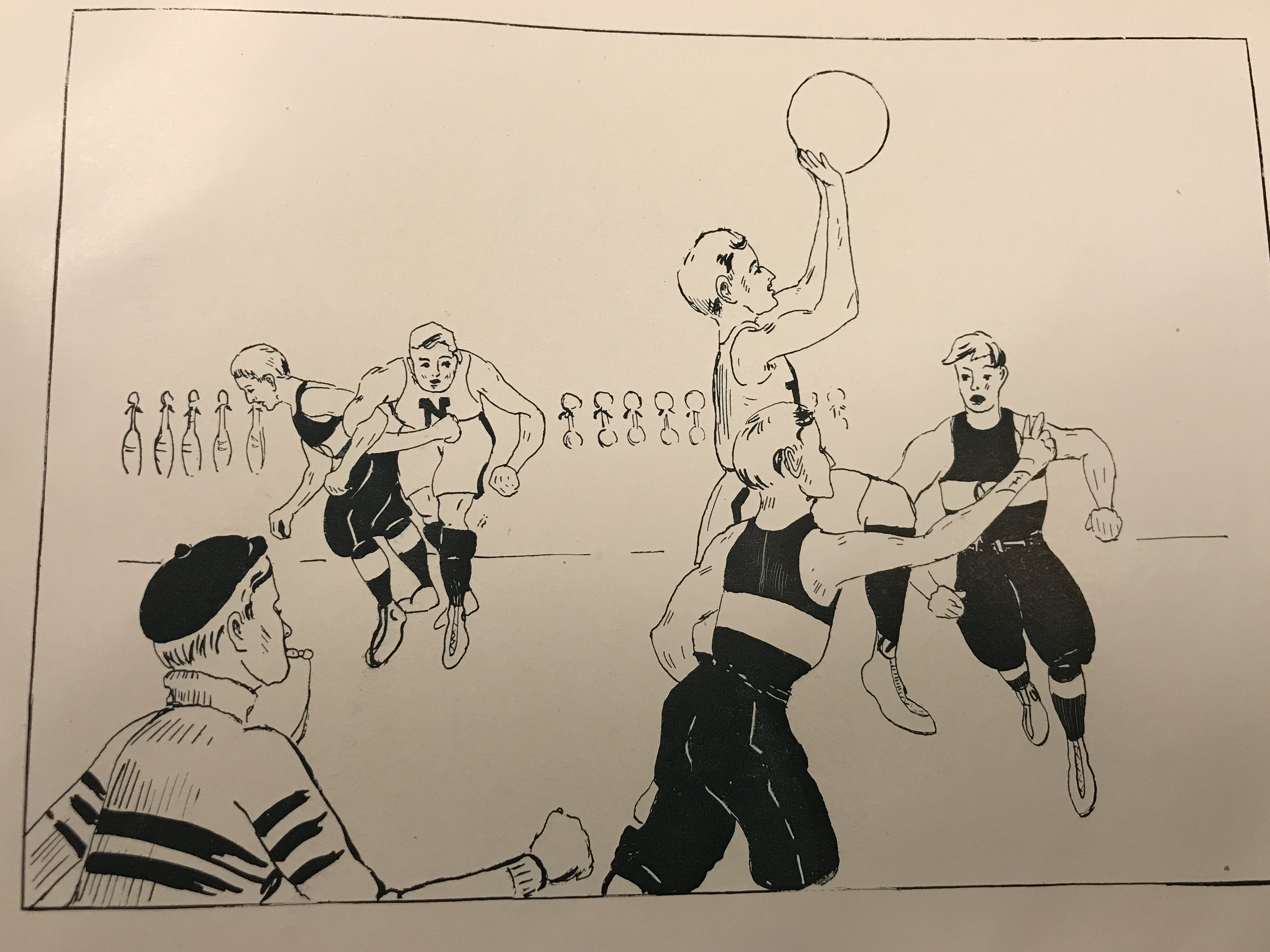
1906 Michigan State Normal College Men's Basketball Drawing

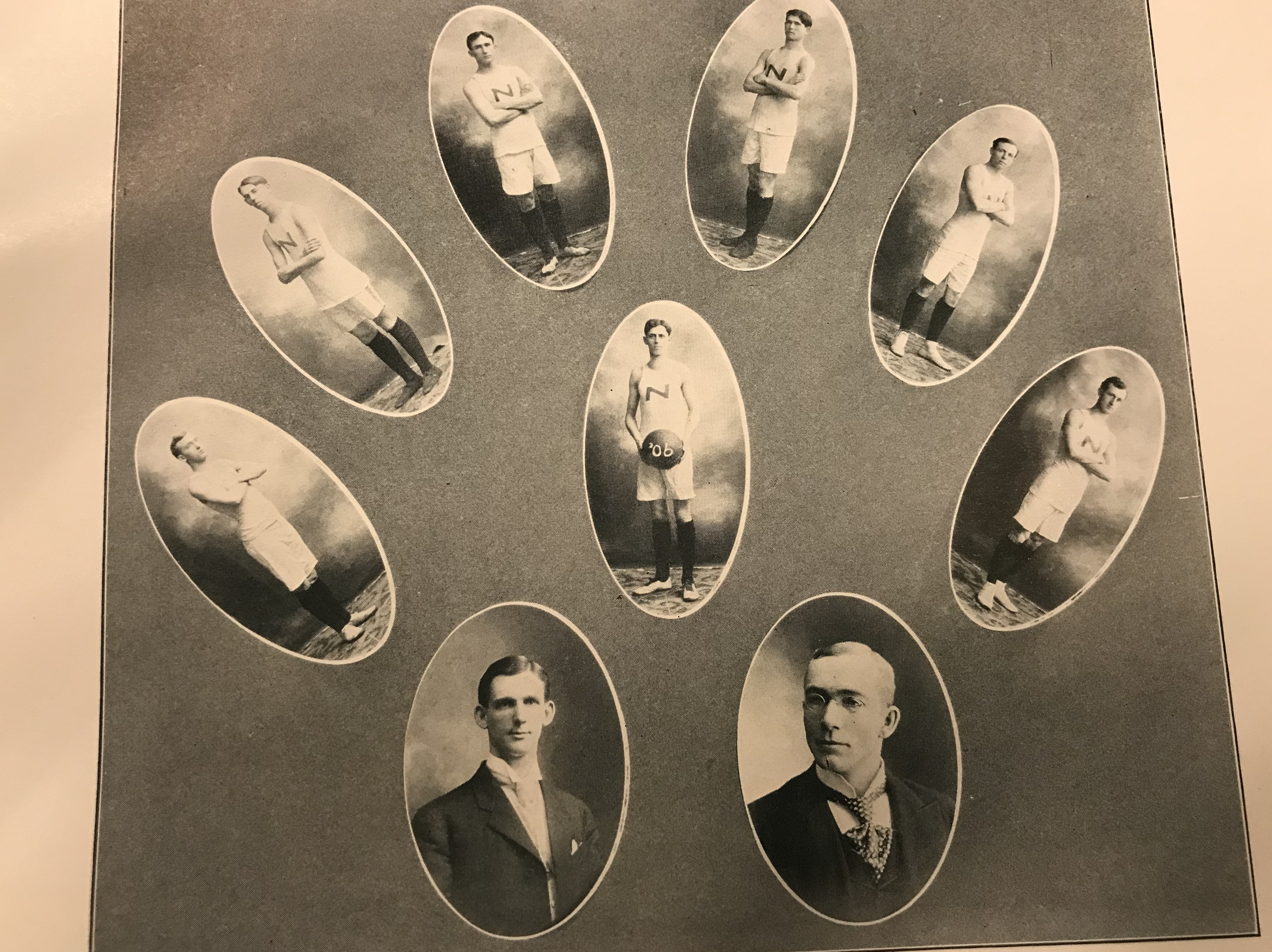
1906 Michigan State Normal College Men's Basketball Team

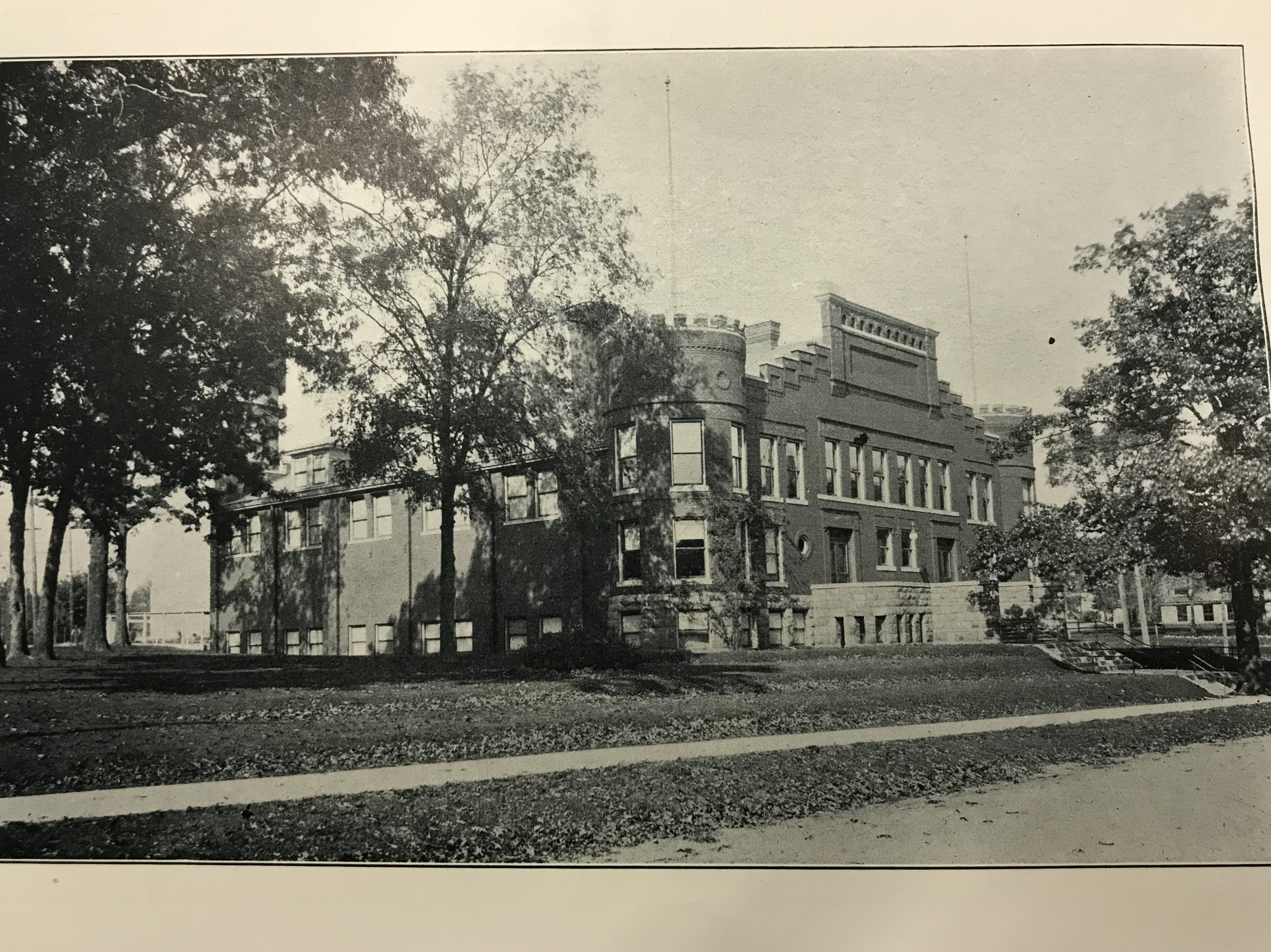
1906 Michigan State Normal College Gymnasium

== Schedule ==
Date time, TV	Rank^{#}	Opponent^{#}	Result	Record	Site (attendance) city, state
Non-conference regular season
December 9, 1905*		at Ann Arbor YMCA	L 10-30	0-1	Ann Arbor, MI
1906*		Alumni	W 34-12	Exhibition	Gymnasium; Ypsilanti, MI
January 20, 1906*		at Ann Arbor YMCA	L 22-42	0-2	Ann Arbor, MI
January 27, 1906*		Adrian College	W 22-17	1-2	Gymnasium; Ypsilanti, MI
January 28, 1906*		Detroit AC	L 9-54	1-3	Gymnasium; Ypsilanti, MI
1906*		Jackson YMCA	W 41-18	2-3	Gymnasium; Ypsilanti, MI
February 9, 1906*		at Central Michigan	W 24-19	3-3	Mount Pleasant, MI
February 13, 1906*		Detroit AC or Central Michigan^{1}	W 33-18	4-3	Gymnasium; Ypsilanti, MI
March 10, 1906*		at Adrian College	L 14-22	4-4	Adrian, MI
*Non-conference game. ^{#}Rankings from AP Poll. (#) Tournament seedings in parentheses. All times are in Eastern Time.

1. Media guide list opponent as Detroit Athletic Club but yearbook list CMU.
