= 1897–98 Michigan State Normal Normalites men's basketball team =

American college basketball season

1897–98 Michigan State Normal Normalites men's basketball
- Conference: Independent
- Record: 2–1
- Head coach: Lemley P. Whitcomb (1st season)
- Home arena: Gymnasium

In 1897 men's basketball is introduced at Michigan State Normal School. The inaugural team went 2–1. 1897–98 was the first season of basketball at the school, which would become Eastern Michigan University Eagles men's basketball team. L.P. Whitcomb was elected the basketball manager at the same meeting that basketball became an official school sport.

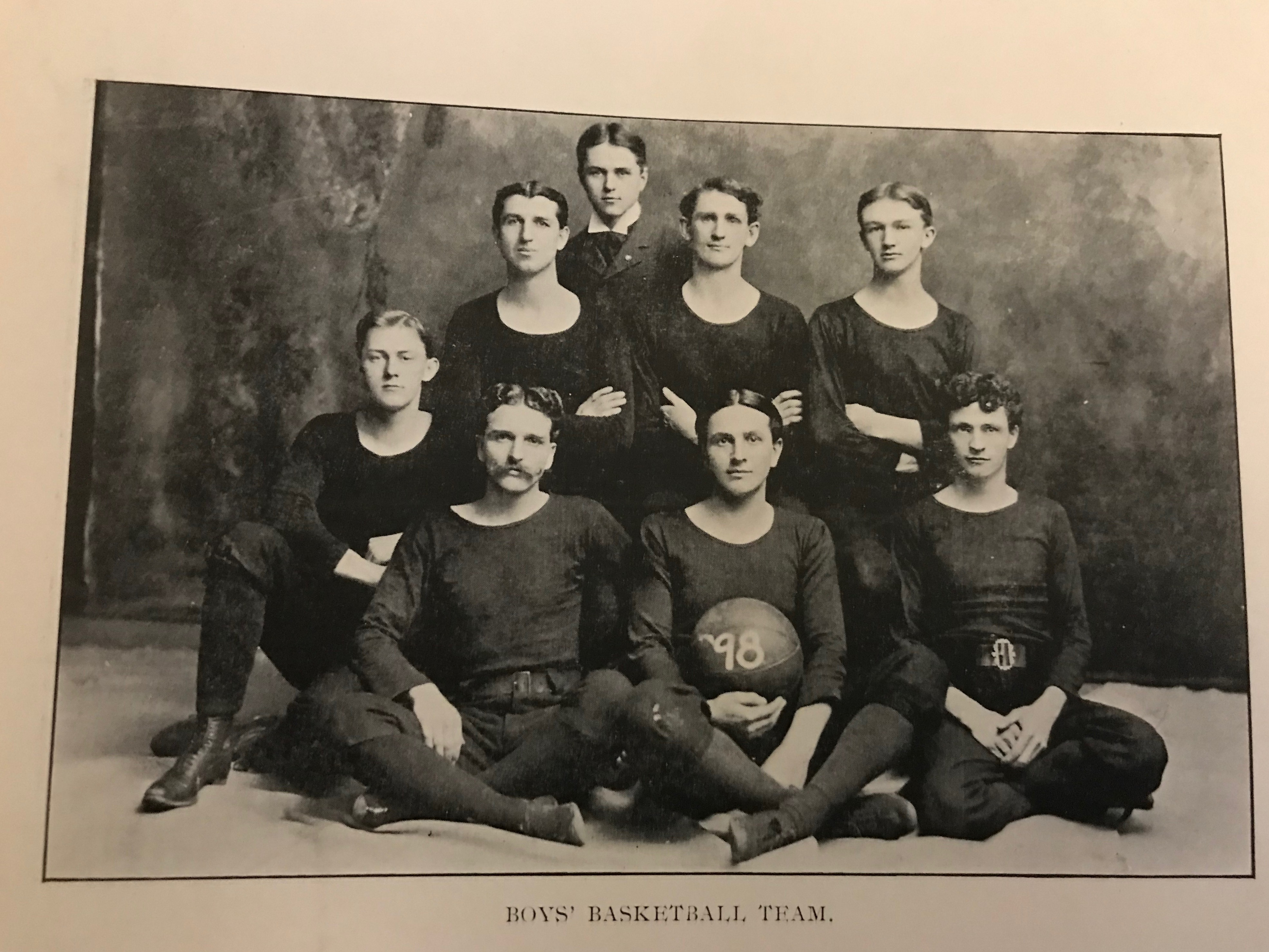
1898 Michigan State Normal College Men's Basketball Team

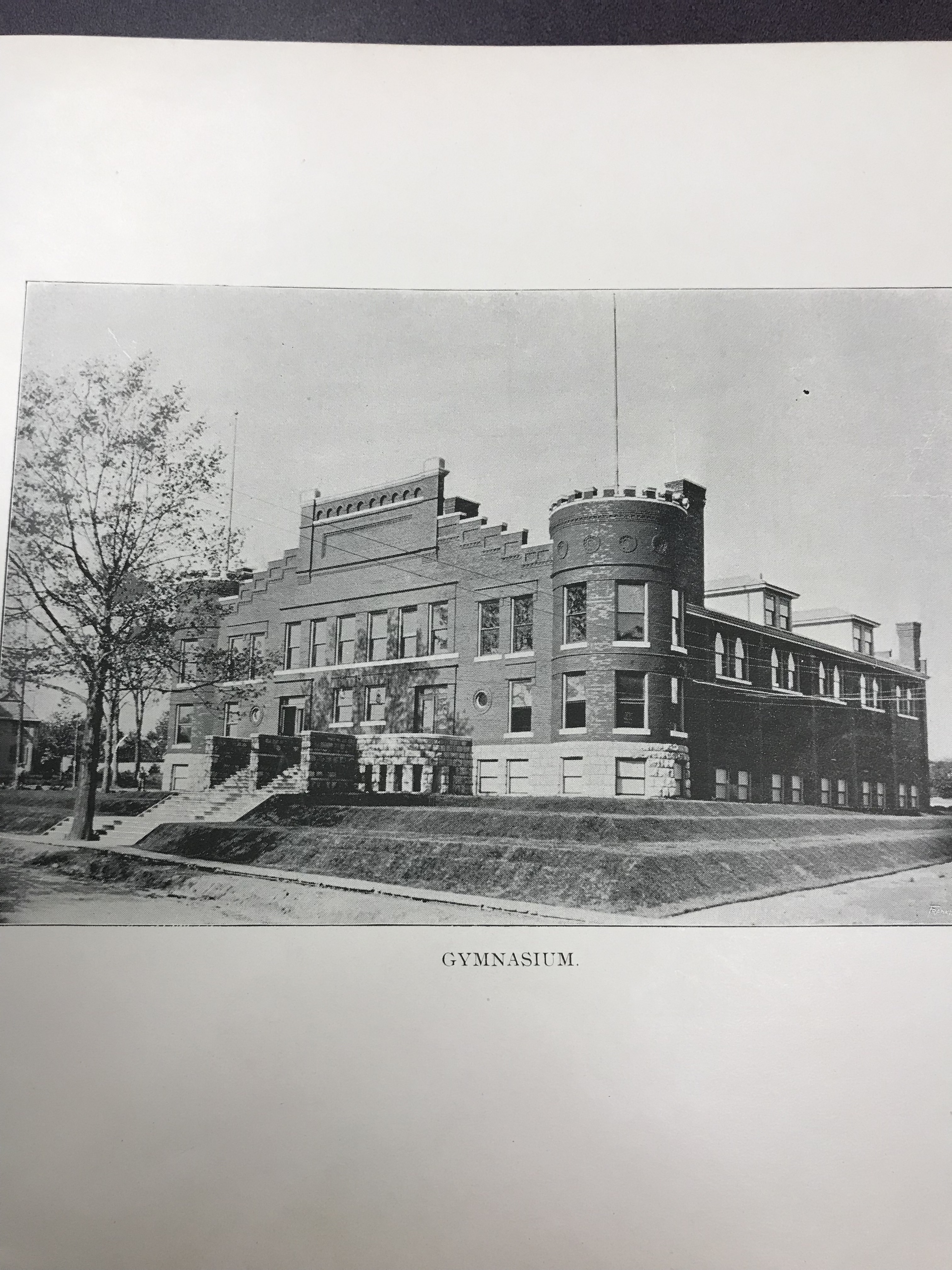
1898 Michigan State Normal College Gymnasium

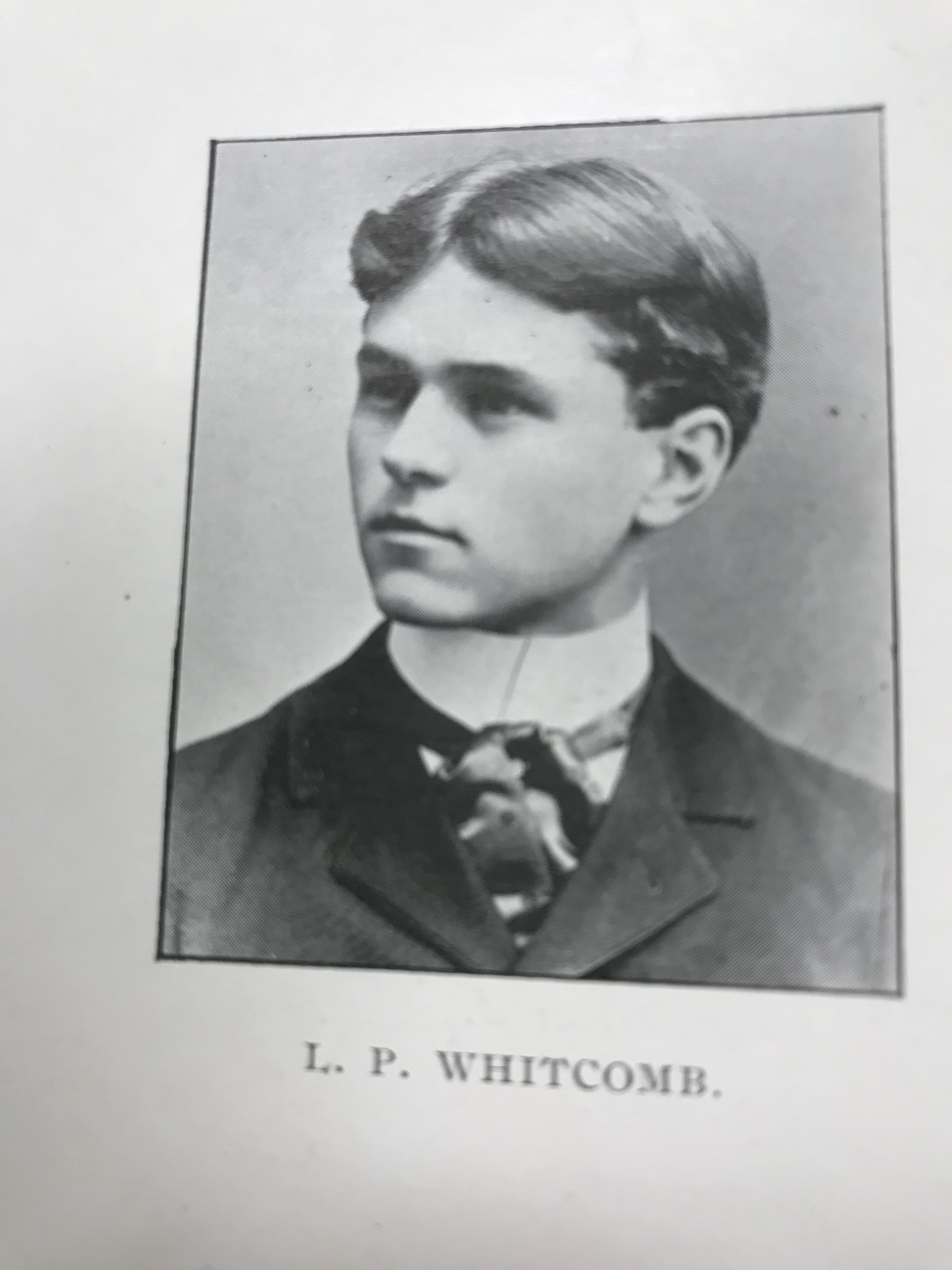
L.P. Whitcomb Michigan State Normal College Men's Basketball Manager 1898

== Roster ==
Number	Name	Position	Class	Hometown	Games Played
	John W. Mitchell	Forward	Junior	Ida, MI	1
	Walter J. Rankin	Forward	Junior	Ray, MI	1
	Earl Reid	Guard	Sophomore	Alpine, MI	1
	Benjamin J. Watters	Guard	Senior	Marlette, MI	1
	Fred Q. Gorten	Center	Sophomore	Ypsilanti, MI	1

== Schedule ==
Date time, TV	Rank^{#}	Opponent^{#}	Result	Record	Site (attendance) city, state
Non-conference regular season
March 4, 1898*		at Detroit Y.M.C.A	L 0-1	0-1	Gymnasium; Detroit, MI
March 11, 1898*; Cancelled		Detroit Y.M.C.A			Gymnasium; Ypsilanti, MI
March 15, 1898*		at Detroit Y.M.C.A	W 4-0	1–1	(2,000-2,500); Detroit, MI
March 1898*		Olivet	W 1-0 (Real score unknown)	2-1	Gymnasium; Ypsilanti, MI
1898*		Albion			Gymnasium; Ypsilanti, MI
*Non-conference game. ^{#}Rankings from AP Poll. (#) Tournament seedings in parentheses. All times are in Eastern Time.

== Game Notes ==
=== March 4, 1898 ===
The Eastern Michigan school newspaper and the Ann Arbor Daily Times wrote that the game was played in Detroit, MI. The Ann Arbor Daily Times also reported the score as 0-1. The Media Guide shows the game was a home game and the score was 0-2.

=== March 15, 1898 ===
EMU led 2-0 at the half. Two minutes into the 2nd half EMU scored to make it 4-0. Then had to leave to "catch their train" and the game was ended.
