= 1900–01 Michigan State Normal Normalites men's basketball team =

American college basketball season

1900–01 Michigan State Normal Normalites men's basketball
- Conference: Independent
- Record: 0–3
- Head coach: M. Everett Dick (1st season)
- Home arena: Gymnasium

The 1900–01 team went 0–3 for the first losing season in school history and the only winless team in school history. It was the only year for coach M. Everett Dick. The team captain was F.L. Cross.

== Roster ==
Number	Name	Position	Class	Hometown
	Frank Leonard Cross	Center	Senior	Cherry Hill, MI
	Charles King	Guard	Senior	Newaygo, MI
	Albert E. Sherman	Guard	Junior	Judds Corners, MI
	Earle L. Peters	Forward	Sophomore	Sylvania, OH
	Carey H. Ireland	Forward	Junior	Berrien Springs, MI
	Lemley P. Whitcomb	Forward	Graduate Student	Ypsilanti, MI

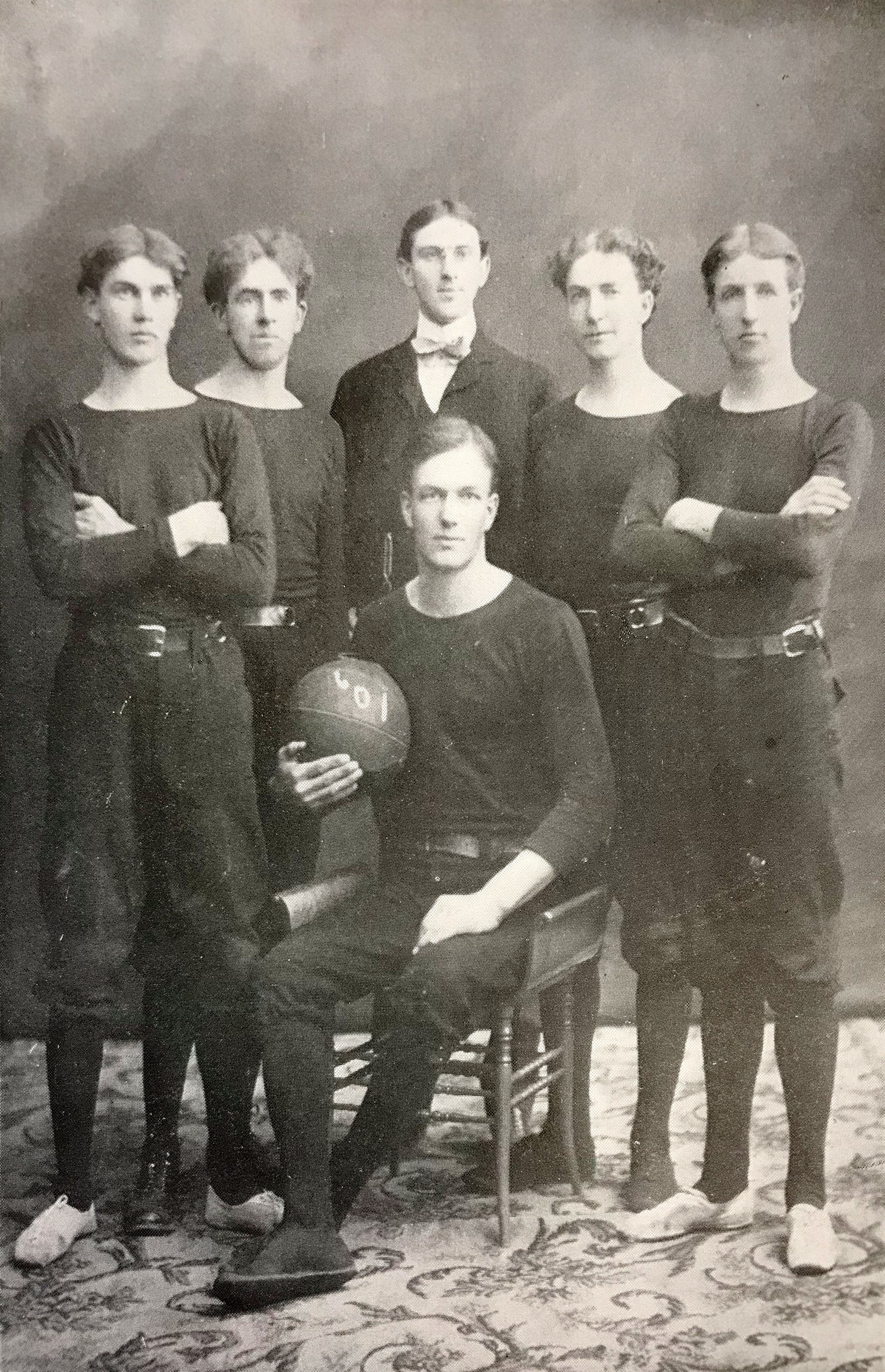
1901 Michigan State Normal College Men's Basketball

== Schedule ==
Date time, TV	Rank^{#}	Opponent^{#}	Result	Record	Site (attendance) city, state
Non-conference regular season
March 2, 1901*		at Michigan State	L 6-21	0-1	Armory; East Lansing, MI
March 9, 1901*		Michigan State	L 7-12	0-2	Gymnasium; Ypsilanti, MI
March 22, 1901*; 8:00		Detroit YMCA	L 3-24	0-3	YMCA Gymnasium; Detroit, MI
1901*		Detroit YMCA	L 1-14	0-4	
*Non-conference game. ^{#}Rankings from AP Poll. (#) Tournament seedings in parentheses. All times are in Eastern Time.

=== Game Notes ===
==== March 9, 1901 ====
The Normal College News and the Detroit Free Press have the date of March 9, while the Media Guide has March 16.
