= 2001–02 Kent State Golden Flashes men's basketball team =

American college basketball season

2001–02 Kent State Golden Flashes men's basketball

MAC tournament champions MAC Regular Season Champions MAC East Division Champions

NCAA tournament, Elite Eight
- Conference: Mid-American Conference
- South

Ranking
- Coaches: No. 12
- Record: 30–6 (17–1 MAC)
- Head coach: Stan Heath (1st season)
- Assistant coach: Jim Christian
- Home arena: Memorial Athletic and Convocation Center

2001–02 Mid-American Conference men's basketball standings
| | Conf. | | | | Overall |
| Team | W | | L | PCT | W | | L | PCT |
|---|---|---|---|---|---|---|---|---|
East
| Kent State† | 17 | – | 1 | .944 | 30 | – | 6 | .833 |
| Bowling Green | 12 | – | 6 | .667 | 24 | – | 9 | .727 |
| Ohio | 11 | – | 7 | .611 | 17 | – | 11 | .607 |
| Miami (OH) | 9 | – | 9 | .500 | 13 | – | 18 | .419 |
| Marshall | 8 | – | 10 | .444 | 15 | – | 15 | .500 |
| Buffalo | 7 | – | 11 | .389 | 12 | – | 18 | .400 |
| Akron | 5 | – | 13 | .278 | 10 | – | 21 | .323 |
West
| Ball State | 12 | – | 6 | .667 | 23 | – | 12 | .657 |
| Toledo | 11 | – | 7 | .611 | 16 | – | 14 | .533 |
| Western Michigan | 10 | – | 8 | .556 | 17 | – | 13 | .567 |
| Northern Illinois | 8 | – | 10 | .444 | 12 | – | 16 | .429 |
| Central Michigan | 5 | – | 13 | .278 | 9 | – | 19 | .321 |
| Eastern Michigan | 2 | – | 16 | .111 | 6 | – | 24 | .200 |
† 2002 MAC tournament winner Rankings from AP Poll

The 2001–02 Kent State Golden Flashes men's basketball team represented Kent State University in the 2001–02 NCAA Division I men's basketball season. Led by head coach Stan Heath, the Flashes finished their best season in program history, posting a 30–6 record and advancing to the Elite Eight of the 2002 NCAA Division I men's basketball tournament after defeating seventh-seeded Oklahoma State, upsetting second-seeded Alabama and third-seeded Pittsburgh, before falling to eventual national runners-up Indiana. The team set program and Mid-American Conference (MAC) records for overall number of wins in a season with 30 and conference wins at 17, while the team's 21-game winning streak set the MAC and team records for both overall winning streak and single-season winning streak.

== Roster ==
2001–02 Kent State Golden Flashes men's basketball team
Players
Coaches

| Pos. | # | Name | Height | Weight | Year | Hometown |
|---|---|---|---|---|---|---|
| C | 2 | Nate Gerwig | 6 ft 9 in (2.06 m) | 260 lb (118 kg) | Fr | Pittsburgh, Pennsylvania |
| G | 10 | Demetric Shaw | 6 ft 3 in (1.91 m) | 195 lb (88 kg) | Sr | Fort Worth, Texas |
| G | 12 | Andrew Mitchell | 5 ft 11 in (1.8 m) | 160 lb (73 kg) | Sr | Detroit, Michigan |
| G | 13 | Bryan Pellegrino | 6 ft 3 in (1.91 m) | 195 lb (88 kg) | Fr | Solon, Ohio |
| F | 15 | Jonathan Merritt | 6 ft 7 in (2.01 m) | 200 lb (91 kg) | Fr | West Bloomfield, Michigan |
| G | 22 | Eric Haut | 6 ft 0 in (1.83 m) | 195 lb (88 kg) | So | Lansing, Michigan |
| G | 24 | Trevor Huffman | 6 ft 1 in (1.85 m) | 190 lb (86 kg) | Sr | Petoskey, Michigan |
| G | 32 | Brian Howard | 6 ft 5 in (1.96 m) | 210 lb (95 kg) | So | Troy, Michigan |
| G | 32 | Anthony Wilkins | 6 ft 7 in (2.01 m) | 215 lb (98 kg) | Jr | Cleveland, Ohio |
| F | 34 | Bryan Bedford | 6 ft 4 in (1.93 m) | 230 lb (104 kg) | So | Racine, Wisconsin |
| F | 40 | Eric Thomas | 6 ft 4 in (1.93 m) | 205 lb (93 kg) | Sr | Springfield, Ohio |
| F | 44 | Antonio Gates | 6 ft 4 in (1.93 m) | 240 lb (109 kg) | Jr | Detroit, Michigan |
| C | 54 | John Edwards | 7 ft 0 in (2.13 m) | 275 lb (125 kg) | So | Hudson, Ohio |

Head coach

Stan Heath

Assistant coach(es)

Jim Christian

Legend

- (C) Team captain
- (S) Suspended
- (I) Ineligible
- (W) Walk-on
- Injured
- Current redshirt

== Schedule and results ==
| Date time, TV | Rank^{#} | Opponent^{#} | Result | Record | Site (attendance) city, state |
Non-Conference Games
| 11/19/01* | | Mercyhurst | W 90–68 | 1–0 | MAC Center (4,216); Kent, OH |
| 11/23/01* | | vs. Hofstra | L 64–67 | 1–1 | Charles L. Sewall Center (1,824); Moon Township, PA |
| 11/24/01 | | at Robert Morris | W 83–55 | 2–1 | Charles L. Sewall Center (1,416); Moon Township, PA |
| 11/25/01* | | vs. UC Irvine | W 75–64 | 3–1 | Charles L. Sewall Center (1,214); Moon Township, PA |
| 11/28/01* | | vs. No. 13 Kentucky | L 68–82 | 3–2 | Firstar Center (10,352); Cincinnati, OH |
| 12/1/01* | | Chattanooga | W 75–56 | 4–2 | MAC Center (4,155); Kent, OH |
| 12/15/01* | | at Youngstown State | L 70–75 | 4–3 | Beeghly Center (3,168); Youngstown, OH |
| 12/20/01* | | at Xavier | L 56–62 | 4–4 | Cintas Center (10,250); Cincinnati, OH |
| 12/22/01* | | at Illinois State | W 61–48 | 5–4 | Redbird Arena (4,802); Normal, IL |
| 12/29* | | vs. Cleveland State | W 66–62 | 6–4 | Gund Arena (10,276); Cleveland, OH |
| 12/31/01* | | St. Bonaventure | W 93–82 ^{OT} | 7–4 | MAC Center (4,318); Kent, OH |
Conference Games
| 1/2/02 | | Ball State | W 81–54 | 8–4 (1–0) | MAC Center (5,073); Kent, OH |
| 1/5/02 | | at Marshall | W 73–70 | 9–4 (2–0) | Cam Henderson Center (5,753); Huntington, WV |
| 1/9/02 | | at Buffalo | L 65–66 | 9–5 (2–1) | Alumni Arena (1,584); Amherst, NY |
| 1/12/02 | | Ohio | W 71–56 | 10–5 (3–1) | MAC Center (5,418); Kent, OH |
| 1/16/02 | | at Akron | W 78–54 | 11–5 (4–1) | James A. Rhodes Arena (3,838); Akron, OH |
| 1/19/02 | | Western Michigan | W 75–72 | 12–5 (5–1) | MAC Center (4,213); Kent, OH |
| 1/22/02 | | Buffalo | W 91–53 | 13–5 (6–1) | MAC Center (4,177); Kent, OH |
| 1/26/02 | | at Bowling Green | W 70–67 | 14–5 (7–1) | Anderson Arena (4,735); Bowling Green, OH |
| 1/29/02 | | at Eastern Michigan | W 82–62 | 15–5 (8–1) | Convocation Center (1,581); Ypsilanti, MI |
| 2/2/02 | | Toledo | W 79–52 | 16–5 (9–1) | MAC Center (5,117); Kent, OH |
| 2/4/02 | | Bowling Green | W 76–64 | 17–5 (10–1) | MAC Center (5,350); Kent, OH |
| 2/9/02 | | at Central Michigan | W 96–66 | 18–5 (11–1) | Rose Arena (4,927); Mount Pleasant, MI |
| 2/13/02 | | at Northern Illinois | W 73–61 | 19–5 (12–1) | Chick Evans Field House; DeKalb, IL |
| 2/16/02 | | Miami (OH) | W 73–57 | 20–5 (13–1) | MAC Center (5,782); Kent, OH |
| 2/19/02 | | Marshall | W 116–76 | 21–5 (14–1) | MAC Center (5,102); Kent, OH |
| 2/23/02 | | at Ohio | W 70–67 | 22–5 (15–1) | Convocation Center; Athens, OH |
| 2/25/02 | | Akron | W 67–57 | 23–5 (16–1) | MAC Center (6,209); Kent, OH |
| 3/2/02 | | at Miami (OH) | W 70–67 | 24–5 (17–1) | Millett Hall (5,012); Oxford, OH |
MAC Tournament
| 3/7/02 | (1) | vs. (8) Marshall; MAC Tournament Quarterfinal | W 82–70 | 25–5 | Gund Arena; Cleveland, OH |
| 3/8/02 | (1) | vs. (4) Toledo; MAC Tournament Semifinal | W 86–61 | 26–5 | Gund Arena; Cleveland, OH |
| 3/9/02 | (1) | vs. (3) Bowling Green; MAC tournament championship | W 70–59 | 27–5 | Gund Arena (14,106); Cleveland, OH |
NCAA Tournament
| 3/14/02*; 12:20 p.m. | (10 S) | vs. (7 S) No. 20 Oklahoma State; First Round | W 69–61 | 28–5 | BI-LO Center (13,194); Greenville, SC |
| 3/16/02* | (10 S) | vs. (2 S) No. 9 Alabama; Second Round | W 71–58 | 29–5 | BI-LO Center (13,962); Greenville, SC |
| 3/21/02* | (10 S) | vs. (3 S) No. 8 Pittsburgh; Sweet Sixteen | W 78–73 ^{OT} | 30–5 | Rupp Arena (22,338); Lexington, KY |
| 3/23/02* | (10 S) | vs. (5 S) Indiana; Elite Eight | L 69–81 | 30–6 | Rupp Arena (22,435); Lexington, KY |
*Non-conference game. ^{#}Rankings from AP poll. (#) Tournament seedings in parentheses. S=South. All times are in Eastern.
