= 2001–02 Mid-American Conference men's basketball season =

- League: NCAA Division I
- Sport: Basketball
- Teams: 13

Regular season
- League champions: Kent State
- Season MVP: Keith McLeod

Tournament
- Champions: Kent State
- Runners-up: Bowling Green
- Finals MVP: Trevor Huffman

Mid-American men's basketball seasons
- ← 2000–01 2002–03 →

2001–02 Mid-American Conference men's basketball standings
	Conf.				Overall
Team	W		L	PCT	W		L	PCT
East
Kent State†	17	–	1	.944	30	–	6	.833
Bowling Green	12	–	6	.667	24	–	9	.727
Ohio	11	–	7	.611	17	–	11	.607
Miami (OH)	9	–	9	.500	13	–	18	.419
Marshall	8	–	10	.444	15	–	15	.500
Buffalo	7	–	11	.389	12	–	18	.400
Akron	5	–	13	.278	10	–	21	.323
West
Ball State	12	–	6	.667	23	–	12	.657
Toledo	11	–	7	.611	16	–	14	.533
Western Michigan	10	–	8	.556	17	–	13	.567
Northern Illinois	8	–	10	.444	12	–	16	.429
Central Michigan	5	–	13	.278	9	–	19	.321
Eastern Michigan	2	–	16	.111	6	–	24	.200
† 2002 MAC tournament winner Rankings from AP Poll

The 2001–02 Mid-American Conference men's basketball season began with practices in October 2001, followed by the start of the 2001–02 NCAA Division I men's basketball season in November. Conference play began in January 2002 and concluded in March 2002. Ball State was the runner-up in the 2001 Maui Invitational Tournament. They opened their season by beating #4 Kansas and #3 UCLA before losing to #1 Duke in the final.

Kent State won the regular season title with a conference record of 17–1 by five games over second-place Ball State and Bowling Green. Kent State defeated Bowling Green in the MAC tournament final and represented the MAC in the NCAA tournament. There they defeated Oklahoma State, Alabama, and Pittsburgh before losing to then eventual national runner-up Indiana Hoosiers in the Elite Eight.

== Preseason awards ==
The preseason poll was announced by the league office on October 25, 2001.

=== Preseason men's basketball poll ===
(First place votes in parentheses)

==== East Division ====
1. Kent State (31) 313
2. Marshall (7) 261
3. Ohio (5) 231
4. Bowling Green (6) 218
5. Miami
6. Akron 107
7. Buffalo 52

==== West Division ====
1. Central Michigan (30) 270
2. Ball State (17) 248
3. Toledo (2) 210
4. Western Michigan 126
5. Northern Illinois 103
6. Eastern Michigan 74

=== Honors ===
Honor	Recipient
Preseason All-MAC	Theron Smith, Ball State
Preseason All-MAC	David Webber, Central Michigan
Preseason All-MAC	Trevor Huffman, Kent State
Preseason All-MAC	Tamar Slay, Marshall
Preseason All-MAC	J.R. VanHoose, Marshall
Preseason All-MAC	Brandon Hunter, Ohio

== Postseason ==
=== Postseason awards ===
1. Coach of the Year: Stan Heath, Kent State
2. Player of the Year: Keith McLeod, Bowling Green
3. Freshman of the Year: Ben Reed, Western Michigan
4. Defensive Player of the Year: Demetric Shaw, Kent State

=== Honors ===
Honor	Recipient
Postseason All-MAC First Team	Andrew Mitchell, Kent State
Postseason All-MAC First Team	Trevor Huffman, Kent State
Postseason All-MAC First Team	Keith McLeod, Bowling Green
Postseason All-MAC First Team	Theron Smith, Ball State
Postseason All-MAC First Team	Brandon Hunter, Ohio
Postseason All-MAC Second Team	Patrick Jackson, Ball State
Postseason All-MAC Second Team	Len Matela, Bowling Green
Postseason All-MAC Second Team	Antonio Gates, Kent State
Postseason All-MAC Second Team	Leon Rodgers, Northern Illinois
Postseason All-MAC Second Team	Steve Reynolds, Western Michigan
All-MAC Freshman Team	Ben Reed, Western Michigan
All-MAC Freshman Team	Darryl Peterson, Akron
All-MAC Freshman Team	Turner Battle, Buffalo
All-MAC Freshman Team	Nate Gerwig, Kent State
All-MAC Freshman Team	Danny Horace, Miami
