= Antonio Gates =

American football player (born 1980)

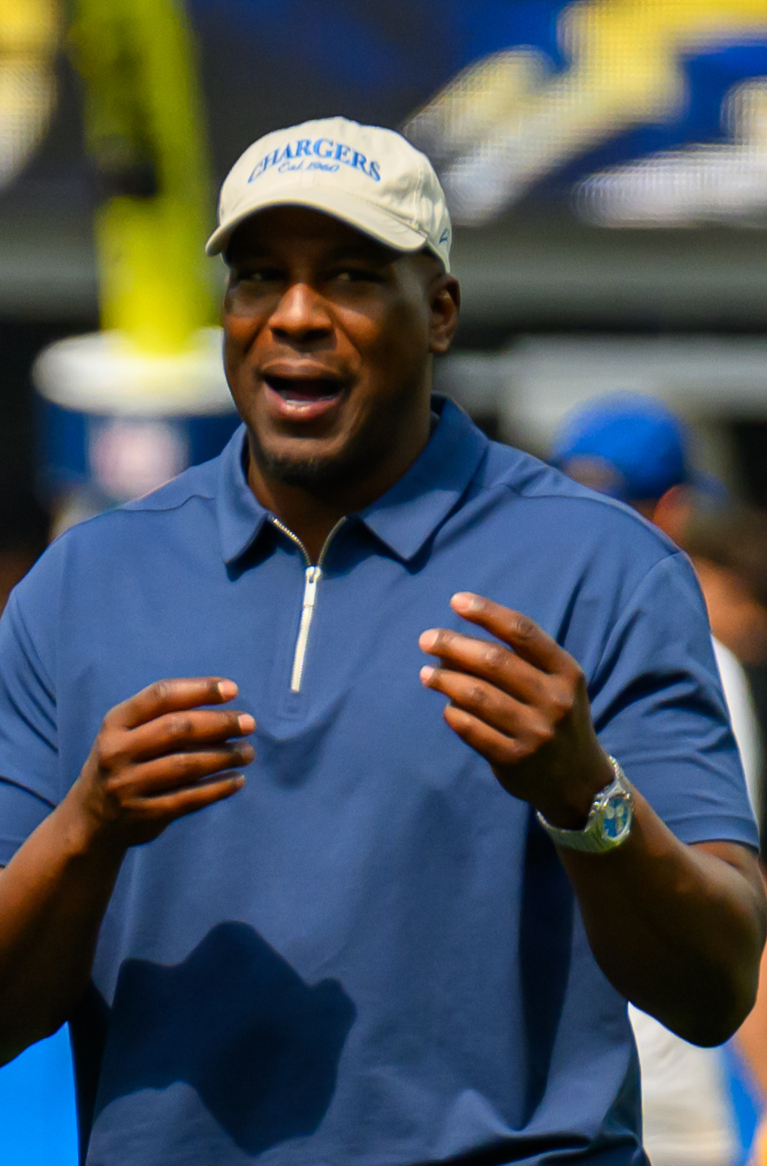
- Gates in 2025
- Born: June 18, 1980 (age 46); Detroit, Michigan, U.S.
- Education: Kent State University
- Football career

No. 85
- Position: Tight end

Personal information
- Listed height: 6 ft 4 in (1.93 m)
- Listed weight: 255 lb (116 kg)

Career information
- High school: Central (Detroit)
- NFL draft: 2003: undrafted

Career history
- San Diego / Los Angeles Chargers (2003–2018)

Awards and highlights
- 3× First-team All-Pro (2004–2006); 2× Second-team All-Pro (2009, 2010); 8× Pro Bowl (2004–2011); Los Angeles Chargers Hall of Fame; NFL 2000s All-Decade Team; San Diego Chargers 50th Anniversary Team; NFL record: Most career receiving touchdowns by a tight end: 116

Career NFL statistics
- Receptions: 955
- Receiving yards: 11,841
- Receiving touchdowns: 116
- Stats at Pro Football Reference
- Pro Football Hall of Fame
- Basketball career

Career information
- High school: Central (Detroit)
- College: Eastern Michigan (1999–2000); Kent State (2001–2003)
- Position: Power forward
- Number: 44

Career highlights
- Honorable mention All-American – AP (2003); First-team All-MAC (2003); Second-team All-MAC (2002); No. 44 retired by Kent State Golden Flashes

Antonio Ethan Gates Jr. (born June 18, 1980) is an American former professional football player who spent his entire 16-year career as a tight end for the San Diego / Los Angeles Chargers of the National Football League (NFL) from 2003 to 2018. He was named to the Pro Bowl eight times and was a five-time Associated Press All-Pro selection. Gates was inducted to the Pro Football Hall of Fame in 2025.

Gates was signed as an undrafted free agent in 2003 after playing college basketball for the Kent State Golden Flashes. He attended college at Kent State University in his junior and senior years after brief stints at Michigan State University and Eastern Michigan University. He is the Chargers' career leader in receiving yards and receiving touchdowns. In 2015, he became the second tight end and ninth player overall to record 100 career touchdown receptions. He ranks seventh in career touchdown receptions, with 116, and leads all tight ends in NFL history. He was the first player to be inducted to the Pro Football Hall of Fame without playing college football. Gates is considered one of the best tight ends and undrafted free agents in NFL history.

== Early life ==
Antonio Ethan Gates Jr. was born on June 18, 1980, in Detroit, Michigan. He wore a size 12 shoe by sixth grade and stood 6 feet 3 inches (1.91 m) entering high school. Gates played high school football and basketball at Central High School. As a freshman, he led their basketball team in scoring.

== College career ==
Gates played basketball rather than football in college. He originally enrolled at Michigan State University wanting to play football under then-coach Nick Saban as well as basketball under coach Tom Izzo. Upon enrolling, he learned that Saban wanted him to play only football. Moreover, the coach wanted to move him to defense as a defensive end or linebacker. Gates then chose to pursue playing basketball by transferring to Eastern Michigan University. He played there part of a season before transferring to the College of the Sequoias, a junior college in California, to focus on academics. Recruited by Stan Heath, Gates transferred to Kent State University in northeastern Ohio.

As a member of the Golden Flashes, Gates played two seasons as power forward. In his junior season he averaged 16.0 points, 8.1 rebounds and 2.7 assists per game. His junior season his team won its first regular season Mid-American Conference (MAC) championship in school history after finishing the regular season with a 24–5 overall record with a 17–1 record in the MAC. Gates helped the Golden Flashes win their second consecutive MAC tournament and earn its resulting berth in the 2002 NCAA Tournament. In the tournament, he gave crucial performances that helped Kent State reach the Elite Eight as a 10 seed by upsetting 7 seed Oklahoma State (69–61), 2 seed Alabama (71–58) and 3 seed Pittsburgh (78–73). He was named second-team All-MAC for the 2002 season.

As a senior, Gates received honorable mention All-American honors from the Associated Press after averaging 20.6 points, 7.7 rebounds, and 4.1 assists per game. He finished with a record of 54–16 in two years of playing. He also earned first-team All-MAC recognition in 2003.

His jersey number, 44, was retired on February 27, 2010, making him just the fourth Golden Flash to receive the honor.

== Professional career ==
After being told by scouts that he was too much of a "tweener" to make the NBA, Gates (6 feet 4 inches (1.93 m)) arranged a workout in front of NFL scouts. Despite never having played college football, as many as 19 teams were believed to have contacted Gates about a tryout. Gates chose to work out first for the San Diego Chargers. Recognizing his potential, the Chargers immediately signed him to a contract as an undrafted free agent.

=== 2003 ===
Lost in the disappointment of San Diego's league-worst 4–12 record was Gates' rise from third string to starter. He made his first catch in week 4 against the Oakland Raiders, scored his first touchdown in week 10 against the Minnesota Vikings, and enjoyed his first 100-yard receiving game (117 yards) against the Green Bay Packers in week 15. Gates caught 24 passes for 389 yards and two touchdowns as a rookie. His 16.2 yards per reception were the highest of his career.

=== 2004 ===
Gates started the 2004 season strong with eight receptions for 123 receiving yards in a 27–20 victory over the Houston Texans. In week 5, he had two receiving touchdowns in a 34–21 victory over the Jacksonville Jaguars. In week 8, against the Oakland Raiders, he had another game with two receiving touchdowns in the 42–14 victory. In the following game, he recorded three receiving touchdowns in a 43–17 victory over the New Orleans Saints. Gates had his third consecutive game finding the endzone in the next game against the Oakland Raiders with an eight-catch, 101-yard day in the 23–17 victory. In the following game, against the Kansas City Chiefs, he had two receiving touchdowns in the 34–31 victory. A preferred target of quarterback Drew Brees, Gates finished his second season in the NFL with 81 receptions for 964 yards and 13 touchdowns.

On December 19, Gates tied the NFL single season record for touchdown receptions by a tight end (12) in a 21–0 win over the Cleveland Browns. He went on to break this record in an overtime loss to the Indianapolis Colts on December 26.

Gates was selected to the 2005 Pro Bowl and earned first team All-Pro honors. Gates scored a touchdown in the Wild Card Round overtime loss to the New York Jets.

=== 2005 ===
On August 23, 2005, after holding out for a contract extension, Gates signed a six-year deal worth up to $24 million with the San Diego Chargers. Because of his holdout, Gates was suspended for one game–the home opener against the Dallas Cowboys, a loss. In week 8, against the Kansas City Chiefs, he had ten receptions for 145 receiving yards and three receiving touchdowns in the 28–20 victory. In the following game, he had eight receptions for 132 receiving yards in the 31–26 victory over the New York Jets. In week 14, he had 13 receptions for 123 receiving yards and one receiving touchdown in the 23–21 loss to the Miami Dolphins.

Gates went on to have another stellar season, catching 89 passes for 1,101 yards and 10 touchdowns, but the Chargers missed the playoffs by a single win. He was named to the Pro Bowl and earned first team All-Pro honors.

=== 2006 ===
Gates had a relatively quiet start to the season, but he finished the year strongly and ended up with 924 receiving yards and nine touchdowns. He caught two touchdown passes on December 10 in a 48–20 victory the Denver Broncos to help the Chargers clinch their division.

Gates was a Pro Bowler and All-Pro for the third straight year. Undefeated at Qualcomm during the regular season, the Chargers and their fans anticipated a trip to the Super Bowl but they were beaten at home 24–21 by the New England Patriots in the Divisional Round.

=== 2007 ===
Gates started off the 2007 season with nine receptions for 107 yards and a touchdown in the 14–3 victory over the Chicago Bears. In week 3, he had 11 receptions for 113 receiving yards against the Green Bay Packers. In week 5, against the Denver Broncos, he had seven receptions for 113 receiving yards and a receiving touchdown in the 41–3 victory. In week 8 against the Houston Texans and in week 12 against the Baltimore Ravens, he had two receiving touchdowns in each game.

For his 2007 season, Gates was selected to the Pro Bowl. During the season, he caught 75 passes for 984 yards and nine touchdowns. He was once again a key factor during the Chargers' 11–5 campaign, but not during the playoffs. Gates dislocated a toe on his right foot just before the postseason, which slowed him down during the Chargers' playoff run.

Gates was not the only Chargers star player injured: both LaDainian Tomlinson and Philip Rivers had leg injuries which hindered the Chargers' chances of reaching the Super Bowl. However, the Chargers did eventually play in the AFC Championship, which they lost 21–12 to the New England Patriots.

=== 2008 ===
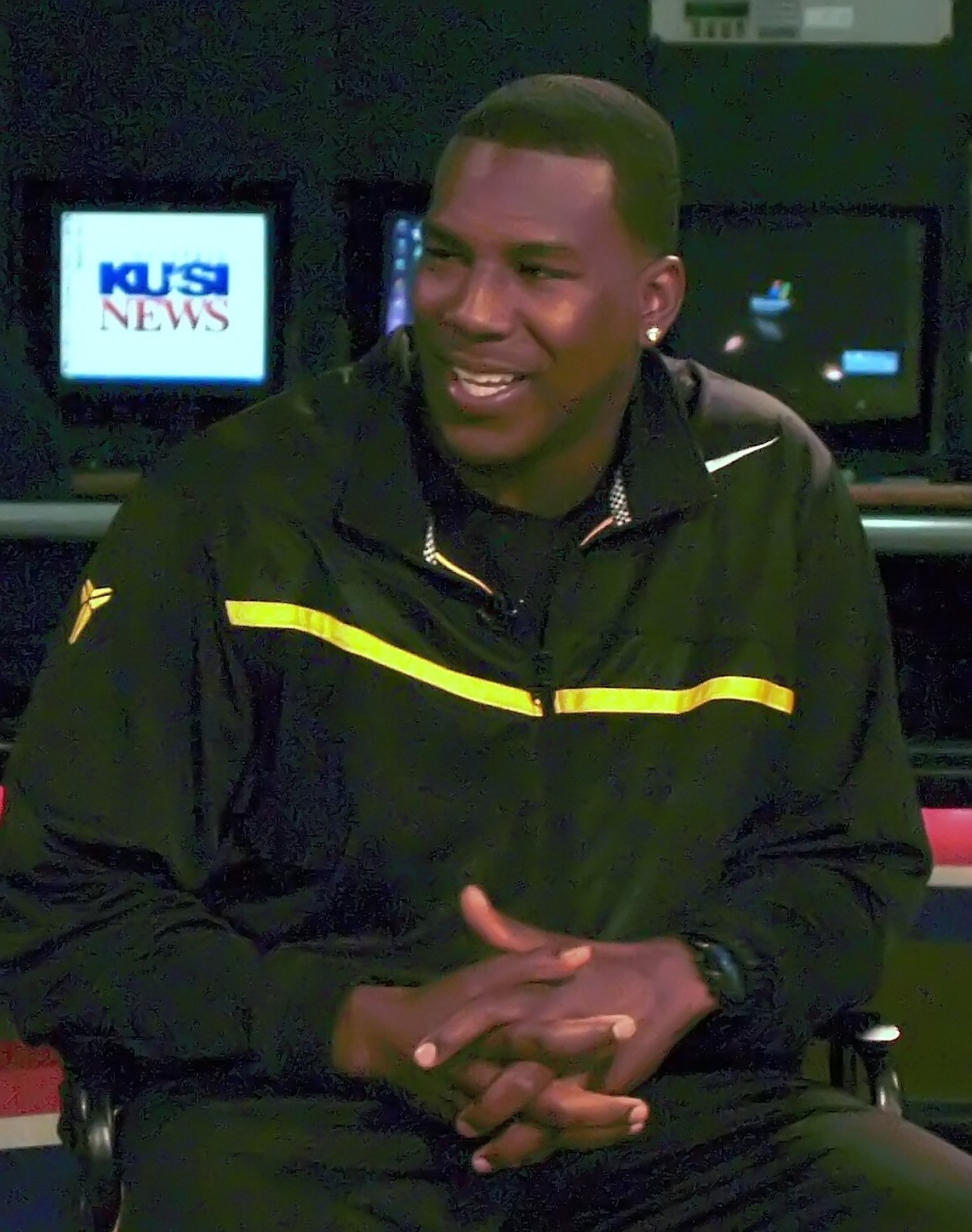
Gates in 2008

Gates said he was leaning toward having surgery to repair a dislocated left big toe that slowed his performance during the 2007–08 NFL playoffs, but was undecided on whether to have surgery or not, "There is higher chance I'm going to have surgery". Gates also pulled out of his fifth Pro Bowl selection because of his injuries alongside his teammate LaDainian Tomlinson. Gates finished the season with 60 receptions for 704 yards and eight touchdowns.

On February 23, 2008, Gates said he would have foot surgery to fix the injury that had slowed him in the final part of the season. He would face a 4–6 month recovery time. Gates seemed questionable for week 1 and even sounded worried about his status for the opening day of the 2008 season; however, he ended up playing every game despite complaints that his toe was bothering him during the first half of the season.

=== 2009 ===
In week 4, against the Pittsburgh Steelers, Gates had nine receptions for 124 receiving yards and two receiving touchdowns in the 38–28 loss. In week 12, against the Kansas City Chiefs, he had seven receptions for 118 receiving yards and two receiving touchdowns in the 43–14 victory. In the following game, he had a season-high 167 receiving yards on eight receptions in the 30–23 victory over the Cleveland Browns. He closed the season out with four consecutive games with a receiving touchdown. Finally healthy after consecutive injury-plagued seasons, Gates enjoyed the most productive year of his career. He caught 79 passes for a career-high 1,157 yards and eight touchdowns. He was named to his sixth consecutive Pro Bowl.

The team finished the year with 13 wins, one of the best records of the year. However, they were eliminated in their first postseason game by the New York Jets in the Divisional Round.

=== 2010 ===
Gates began the 2010 season by signing a five-year, $36 million contract with $20 million guaranteed. In week 2, against the Jacksonville Jaguars, he recorded two receiving touchdowns in the 38–13 victory. In week 4, against the Arizona Cardinals, he had seven receptions for 144 receiving yards and two receiving touchdowns in the 41–10 victory. He became the seventh tight end in NFL history with 500+ career receptions. In the first nine games of the 2010 season, he had 40 receptions and nine touchdowns.

Despite being limited by foot injuries throughout the second half of the 2010 season, Gates earned a Pro Bowl selection for his seventh consecutive year; however, as a result of his lingering injuries, Gates did not participate in the game. He was ranked 22nd by his fellow players on the NFL Top 100 Players of 2011.

=== 2011 ===
Gates tried to play through his chronic foot problems but was forced to sit out Weeks 3–5. He came back after the bye week and started every game the rest of the way. In week 14, against the Buffalo Bills, he had two receiving touchdowns in the 37–10 victory. He finished with more than 60 catches (64) for the seventh time in his career. He also scored seven touchdowns and was voted into his eighth Pro Bowl. Gates became the Chargers' all-time receptions leader on a six-yard catch on a fourth-and-5, early in the fourth quarter against Detroit. It was his 587th career catch, surpassing Charlie Joiner's 586.

=== 2012 ===
In week 6, Gates had two receiving touchdowns in a 35–24 loss to the Denver Broncos, on a night where the Chargers held a 24–0 halftime lead. Gates had another record-breaking season, becoming the fifth tight end in NFL history with 600 career catches and runner-up for most touchdowns in Chargers franchise history with 83. The tight end and his quarterback Philip Rivers connected for a total of 56 touchdown catches, the most out of any quarterback-tight end combination in the NFL. He was ranked 73rd by his fellow players on the NFL Top 100 Players of 2013.

=== 2013 ===
Gates had two games on the season going over the 100-yard mark, week 2 against the Philadelphia Eagles and week 4 against the Dallas Cowboys. played all 16 games for the first time since 2009, finishing with 70 receptions (77) for the fourth time in his career. However, Gates only scored four touchdowns, his fewest since his rookie season in 2003.

=== 2014 ===
In week 2, against the Seattle Seahawks, Gates had three receiving touchdowns in the 30–21 victory. He was named AFC Offensive Player of the Week for his game against Seattle. Gates passed Lance Alworth to become the Chargers' career leader in receiving yards in week 7 against the Denver Broncos. In the season's final game against the Kansas City Chiefs, he became the fourth tight end in NFL history to surpass 10,000 yards in career receiving yards. (Note: The other three tight ends were Tony Gonzalez, Shannon Sharpe, and Jason Witten.) He finished the season with 12 touchdowns, becoming the fourth player in league history to catch 12 or more touchdowns in a season at age 34. (Note: The others were wide receivers Cris Carter, Marvin Harrison, and Terrell Owens.) His teammates voted him the Chargers' Offensive Player of the Year and he was invited as an alternate for the Pro Bowl, but declined. He was ranked 52nd by his fellow players on the NFL Top 100 Players of 2015.

=== 2015 ===
On July 2, 2015, it was announced that Gates would be suspended for the first four games of the 2015 season for violating the NFL's rules on performance enhancing drugs (PEDs). On October 12, 2015, against the Pittsburgh Steelers in his first game back after from a four-game suspension, Gates scored his 100th and 101st career touchdown receptions. He became the ninth NFL player, and second tight end, to catch 100+ career touchdowns He finished the season with 630 yards and five touchdowns on 56 receptions. On March 9, 2016, Gates signed a two-year contract extension to remain with the Chargers.

=== 2016 ===
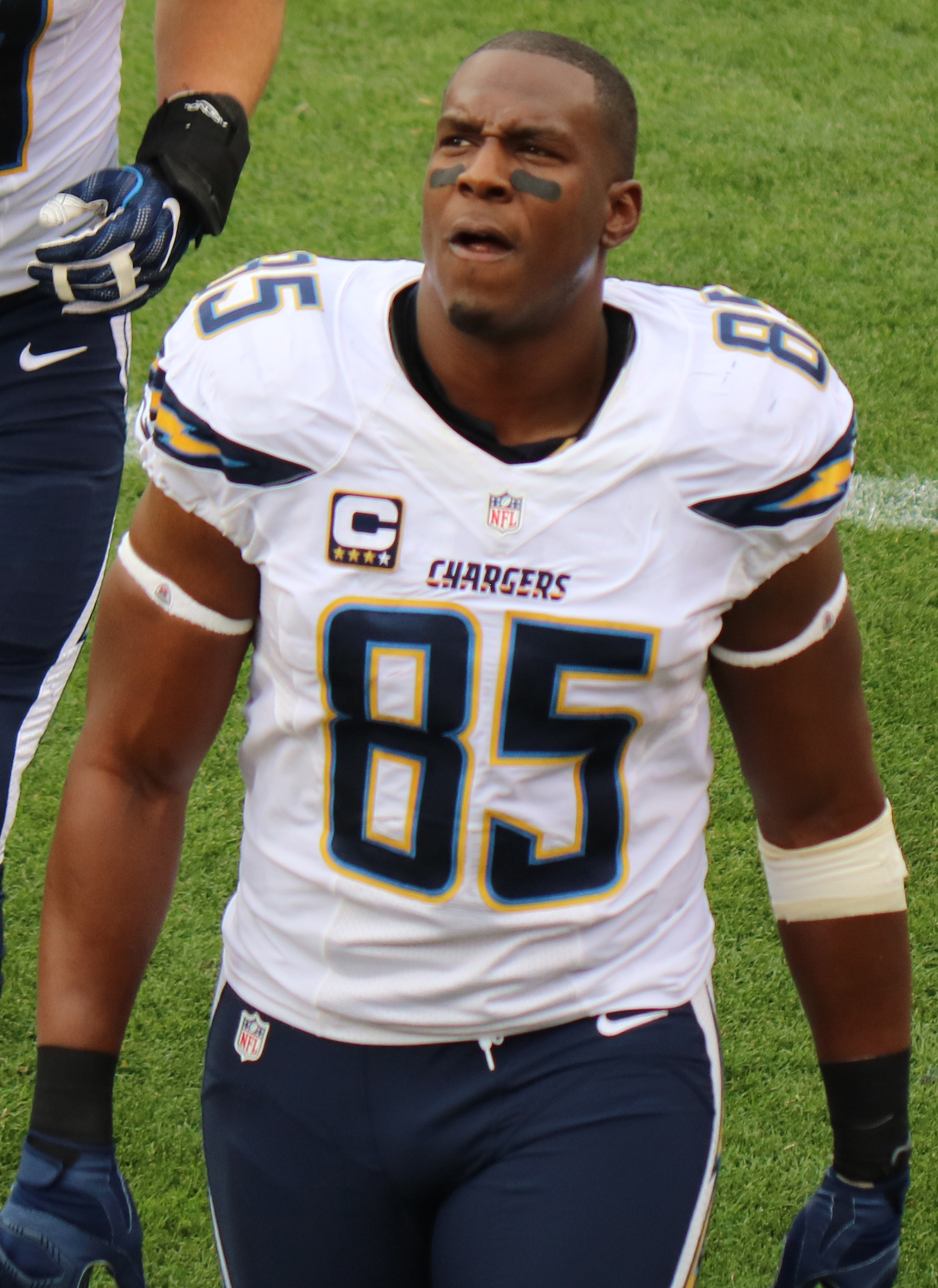
Gates with San Diego Chargers in 2016

Gates played in 14 games in 2016, starting nine. The emergence of rookie tight end Hunter Henry affected Gates's production. He caught 53 passes for 538 yards and scored seven touchdowns. His 10.3 yards per reception and 57% completion percentage were the lowest of his career.

=== 2017 ===
In week 2, against the Miami Dolphins, he caught his 112th career touchdown pass, which set a new NFL record for most touchdowns as a tight end. Following the emergence of second-year tight end Hunter Henry as a starter, Gates only started four games and finished with 30 receptions for a career-low 316 yards and three touchdowns.

On April 27, 2018, the Chargers informed Gates they would not be bringing him back for the 2018 season.

=== 2018 ===
On September 2, 2018, Gates re-signed with the Los Angeles Chargers following an injury to Hunter Henry. In week 4, against the San Francisco 49ers, he scored his first receiving touchdown of the season. He finished the 2018 season with 28 receptions for 333 receiving yards and two receiving touchdowns in 16 games and one start.

In what would be his final NFL game, Gates recorded a receiving touchdown in the 41–28 loss to the New England Patriots in the Divisional Round.

=== Retirement ===
Gates announced his retirement on January 14, 2020. He ended his career with a record 116 touchdown catches by a tight end, including 89 thrown by Rivers for the most ever by a quarterback–tight end duo at the time. He also finished as the Chargers' franchise leader in receptions (955) and receiving yards (11,841).

In 2020, Gates announced he was joining the Los Angeles Chargers front office as Legends Ambassador.

== Career statistics ==
Legend
**Bold**	Career high

=== NFL ===
==== Regular season ====
Year	Team	Games		Receiving					Fumbles	
Year	Team	GP	GS	Rec	Yds	Avg	Lng	TD	Fum	Lost
2003	SD	15	11	24	389	**16.2**	48	2	1	1
2004	SD	15	15	81	964	11.9	**72**	**13**	0	0
2005	SD	15	15	**89**	1,101	12.4	38	10	0	0
2006	SD	16	16	71	924	13.0	57	9	0	0
2007	SD	16	16	75	984	13.1	49	9	0	0
2008	SD	16	16	60	704	11.7	34	8	1	1
2009	SD	16	16	79	**1,157**	14.6	56	8	1	0
2010	SD	10	10	50	782	15.6	48	10	0	0
2011	SD	13	13	64	778	12.2	38	7	0	0
2012	SD	15	15	49	538	11.0	34	7	0	0
2013	SD	16	15	77	872	11.3	56	4	**2**	**2**
2014	SD	16	14	69	821	11.9	34	12	1	0
2015	SD	11	4	56	630	11.3	40	5	0	0
2016	SD	14	9	53	548	10.3	27	7	1	1
2017	LAC	16	4	30	316	10.5	27	3	0	0
2018	LAC	16	1	28	333	11.9	27	2	1	1
Career		236	190	955	11,841	12.4	72	116	8	6

==== Postseason ====
Year	Team	Games		Receiving					Fumbles	
Year	Team	GP	GS	Rec	Yds	Avg	Lng	TD	Fum	Lost
2004	SD	1	1	6	89	**14.8**	**44**	**1**	0	0
2006	SD	1	1	6	61	10.2	19	0	0	0
2007	SD	3	2	6	60	10.0	23	0	0	0
2008	SD	2	2	**13**	**146**	11.2	30	0	0	0
2009	SD	1	1	8	93	11.6	23	0	0	0
2013	SD	2	2	3	15	5.0	5	0	0	0
2018	LAC	2	1	9	76	8.4	14	**1**	0	0
Career		12	10	51	540	10.6	44	2	0	0

=== College basketball ===
Legend
GP	Games played	GS	Games started	MPG	Minutes per game
FG%	Field goal percentage	3P%	3-point field goal percentage	FT%	Free throw percentage
RPG	Rebounds per game	APG	Assists per game	SPG	Steals per game
BPG	Blocks per game	PPG	Points per game	**Bold**	Career high

Year	Team	GP	GS	MPG	FG%	3P%	FT%	RPG	APG	SPG	BPG	PPG
1999–2000	Eastern Michigan	18	15	24.2	**.518**	.167	.582	7.4	1.3	1.0	**.7**	10.2
2001–02	Kent State	36	36	32.3	**.518**	.250	.706	**8.1**	2.7	1.2	.4	16.0
2002–03	Kent State	31	31	**33.3**	.478	**.349**	**.709**	7.7	**4.1**	**1.5**	.2	**20.6**
Career		85	82	30.9	.500	.301	.690	7.8	2.9	1.2	.4	16.5

== Career highlights ==
=== Awards and honors ===
NFL

- 3× First-team Associated Press All-Pro (2004, 2005, 2006)
- 2× Second-team Associated Press All-Pro (2009, 2010)
- 8× Pro Bowl (2004, 2005, 2006, 2007, 2008, 2009, 2010, 2011)
- 3× NFL Top 100 — 22nd (2011), 73rd (2013), 52nd (2015)
- NFL 2000s All-Decade Team
- San Diego Chargers 50th Anniversary Team (2009)
- Inducted into the San Diego Chargers Hall of Fame (2023)
- Inducted into Pro Football Hall of Fame (2025)

College

- Kent State Golden Flashes men's basketball No. 44 retired

=== Records ===
==== NFL ====
- Most career receiving touchdowns by a tight end: 116

==== Chargers ====
Active

- Most career receiving yards: 11,841
- Most career receiving touchdowns: 116

Former

- Most career receptions: 955 (broken by Keenan Allen, 2025)

== Personal life ==
Gates married his longtime girlfriend, model Sasha Dindayal, on July 9, 2011. As of 2014, the couple resided in Encino, California. Gates' son, Antonio Jr., was a wide receiver for Delaware State from 2023 to 2024.

Gates appeared in the fourth episode of season one and the final episode of season six of The League. He also appeared on a season 27 episode of The Bachelor.
