= 2001–02 Ohio Bobcats men's basketball team =

American college basketball season

2001–02 Ohio Bobcats men's basketball
- Conference: Mid-American Conference
- East Division
- Record: 17–11 (11–7 MAC)
- Head coach: Tim O'Shea (1st season)
- Assistant coaches: Kevin Kuwik; John Rhodes
- Home arena: Convocation Center

2001–02 Mid-American Conference men's basketball standings
	Conf.				Overall
Team	W		L	PCT	W		L	PCT
East
Kent State†	17	–	1	.944	30	–	6	.833
Bowling Green	12	–	6	.667	24	–	9	.727
Ohio	11	–	7	.611	17	–	11	.607
Miami (OH)	9	–	9	.500	13	–	18	.419
Marshall	8	–	10	.444	15	–	15	.500
Buffalo	7	–	11	.389	12	–	18	.400
Akron	5	–	13	.278	10	–	21	.323
West
Ball State	12	–	6	.667	23	–	12	.657
Toledo	11	–	7	.611	16	–	14	.533
Western Michigan	10	–	8	.556	17	–	13	.567
Northern Illinois	8	–	10	.444	12	–	16	.429
Central Michigan	5	–	13	.278	9	–	19	.321
Eastern Michigan	2	–	16	.111	6	–	24	.200
† 2002 MAC tournament winner Rankings from AP Poll

The 2001–02 Ohio Bobcats men's basketball team represented Ohio University in the college basketball season of 2001–02. The team was coached by Tim O'Shea i his first season and played their home games at the Convocation Center. They finished the season 17–11 and 11–7 in MAC play to finish third in the MAC East.

== Roster ==
2001–02 Ohio Bobcats men's basketball team
Players
Coaches

Pos.	#	Name	Height	Weight	Year	Hometown
F	34	Brandon Hunter	6 ft 7 in (2.01 m)	260 lb (118 kg)	Jr	Cincinnati, Ohio
G	15	James Bridgewater	6 ft 3 in (1.91 m)	200 lb (91 kg)	Fr	Ann Arbor, Michigan
G	25	Steve Esterkamp	6 ft 6 in (1.98 m)	200 lb (91 kg)	Jr	Cincinnati, Ohio
F	33	Jon Sanderson	6 ft 7 in (2.01 m)	230 lb (104 kg)	Sr	Lexington, Ohio
F	40	Patrick Flomo	6 ft 9 in (2.06 m)	205 lb (93 kg)	Sr	Columbus, Ohio
G	25	Zach Kiekow	6 ft 1 in (1.85 m)	180 lb (82 kg)	Fr	Osseo, Minnesota
G	15	Jaivon Harris	6 ft 5 in (1.96 m)	194 lb (88 kg)	So	Alliance, Ohio
G	22	Thomas Stephens	6 ft 0 in (1.83 m)	175 lb (79 kg)	Jr	Springfield, Ohio
F	44	Alex Liatsos	6 ft 8 in (2.03 m)	215 lb (98 kg)	So	Limassol, Cyprus
F	31	Kevin Shorter	6 ft 8 in (2.03 m)	200 lb (91 kg)	So	Clinton Township, Macomb County, Michigan
G	12	Jason Crawford	6 ft 5 in (1.96 m)	220 lb (100 kg)	Sr	Cincinnati, Ohio
F	32	Sonny Johnson	6 ft 5 in (1.96 m)	211 lb (96 kg)	Jr	Garfield Heights, Ohio

Head coach

- Tim O'Shea

Assistant coach(es)

- Gary Manchel
- John Rhodes
- Kevin Kuwik
- Isaiah Cavaco

Legend

- (C) Team captain
- (S) Suspended
- (I) Ineligible
- (W) Walk-on
- Injured
- Current redshirt

== Preseason ==
The preseason poll was announced by the league office on October 25, 2001. Ohio was picked third in the MAC East.

=== Preseason men's basketball poll ===
(First place votes in parentheses)

==== East Division ====
1. Kent State (31) 313
2. Marshall (7) 261
3. Ohio (5) 231
4. Bowling Green (6) 218
5. Miami
6. Akron 107
7. Buffalo 52

==== West Division ====
1. Central Michigan (30) 270
2. Ball State (17) 248
3. Toledo (2) 210
4. Western Michigan 126
5. Northern Illinois 103
6. Eastern Michigan 74

=== Preseason All-MAC ===
Preseason All-MAC teams
Team	Player	Position	Year
Preseason All-MAC	Brandon Hunter	F	Jr.

== Schedule and results ==
Date time, TV	Rank^{#}	Opponent^{#}	Result	Record	Site (attendance) city, state
Regular Season
11/26/01*; 7:30 pm		at Navy	W 80–74	1–0	Alumni Hall (1,434); Annapolis, MD
11/29/01*; 7:30 pm		Duquesne	W 73–60	2–0	Convocation Center (5,042); Athens, OH
12/4/01*; 8:30 pm		at DePaul	W 77–75	3–0	Allstate Arena (4,039); Rosemont, IL
12/8/01*; 3:00 pm		Wisconsin	L 71–77	3–1	Convocation Center (9,059); Athens, OH
12/12/01*; 3:00 pm		at St. Bonaventure	L 85–97	3–2	Reilly Center (5,284); St. Bonaventure, NY
12/15/01*; 1:00 pm		Oakland	W 71–70	4–2	Convocation Center (3,705); Athens, Ohio
12/27/01*; 5:00 pm		vs. Long Island; FIU New Year's Classic	W 110–57	5–2	Golden Panther Arena (328); Miami, Florida
12/28/01*; 8:00 pm		vs. Vermont; FIU New Year's Classic	L 79–91	5–3	Golden Panther Arena (328); Miami, Florida
MAC regular season
1/2/02; 8:05 pm		at Northern Illinois	W 88–76	6–3 (1–0)	Evans Fieldhouse (1,600); DeKalb, IL
1/5/02; 1:00 pm		at Akron	W 68–57	7–3 (2–0)	Rhodes Arena (2,043); Akron, OH
1/9/02; 7:00 pm		Western Michigan	W 86–68	8–3 (3–0)	Convocation Center (5,652); Athens, OH
1/12/02; 7:00 pm		at Kent State	L 56–71	8–4 (3–1)	Memorial A & C Center (5,418); Kent, OH
1/15/02; 7:00 pm		at Buffalo	W 62–61	9–4 (4–1)	Alumni Arena (1,201); Buffalo, NY
1/19/02; 2:00 pm		Miami (OH)	W 85–61	10–4 (5–1)	Convocation Center (11,118); Athens, OH
1/22/02; 7:00 pm		at Eastern Michigan	W 80–66	11–4 (6–1)	Convocation Center (1,012); Ypsilanti, MI
1/25/02; 4:00 pm		at Western Michigan	L 65–95	11–5 (6–2)	University Arena (2,871); Kalamazoo, MI
1/30/02; 7:00 pm		Akron	L 73–74	11–6 (6–3)	Convocation Center (5,982); Athens, OH
2/2/02; 4:00 pm		Marshall	W 94–78	12–6 (7–3)	Convocation Center (8,750); Athens, OH
2/6/02; 7:00 pm		at Bowling Green	L 64–80	12–7 (7–4)	Anderson Arena (3,977); Bowling Green, OH
2/9/02; 2:00 pm		Ball State	W 85–71	13–7 (8–4)	Convocation Center (7,545); Athens, OH
2/11/02; 7:30 pm		at Miami (OH)	L 55–79	13–8 (8–5)	Millet Hall (5,032); Oxford, OH
2/13/02; 7:00 pm		Central Michigan	W 64–50	14–8 (9–5)	Convocation Center (5,502); Athens, OH
2/16/02; 4:00 pm		at Marshall	W 71–66	15–8 (10–5)	Cam Henderson Center (6,626); Huntington, WV
2/20/02*; 7:30 pm		at North Carolina	W 86–78	16–8 (10–5)	Dean E. Smith Center (13,252); Chapel Hill, NC
2/23/02; 2:00 pm		Kent State	L 67–70	16–9 (10–6)	Convocation Center (10,962); Athens, OH
2/27/02; 7:00 pm		Toledo	L 68–69	16–10 (10–7)	Convocation Center (5,895); Athens, OH
3/2/02; 3:00 pm		Bowling Green	W 85–78	17–10 (11–7)	Convocation Center (8,103); Athens, OH
MAC tournament
3/4/02; 7:00 pm		Central Michigan; First Round	L 56–65	17–11	Convocation Center (5,569); Athens, OH
*Non-conference game. ^{#}Rankings from AP Poll. (#) Tournament seedings in parentheses. All times are in Eastern.

== Statistics ==
=== Team statistics ===
Final 2001–02 statistics

Record	Ohio	OPP
Scoring	2104	2014
Scoring Average	75.14	71.93
Field goals – Att	741–1531	692–1575
3-pt. Field goals – Att	168–451	–
Free throws – Att	454–666	–
Rebounds	939	936
Assists	399	
Turnovers	395	
Steals	216	
Blocked Shots	109	

=== Player statistics ===
			Minutes		Scoring		Total FGs			3-point FGs			Free-Throws			Rebounds								
Player	GP	GS	Tot	Avg	Pts	Avg	FG	FGA	Pct	3FG	3FA	Pct	FT	FTA	Pct	Off	Def	Tot	Avg	A	PF	TO	Stl	Blk
Brandon Hunter	26	26	842	842	451	451	159	325	0.489	25	67	0.373	108	179	0.603	55	182	237	237	59	60	86	28	26
Sonny Johnson	24	0	554	554	380	380	142	277	0.513	10	32	0.313	86	121	0.711	43	32	75	75	28	71	62	24	0
Steve Esterkamp	28	28	901	901	376	376	118	254	0.465	56	126	0.444	84	107	0.785	21	94	115	115	59	65	41	49	6
Jon Sanderson	28	2	626	626	226	226	77	174	0.443	34	90	0.378	38	51	0.745	41	54	95	95	44	59	32	20	13
Jaivon Harris	28	6	671	671	211	211	69	141	0.489	25	65	0.385	48	59	0.814	6	62	68	68	82	77	48	22	6
Patrick Flomo	28	28	715	715	202	202	80	138	0.58	0	0	0	42	76	0.553	53	77	130	130	28	78	41	15	53
James Bridgewater	25	0	273	273	90	90	35	68	0.515	0	2	0	20	30	0.667	16	26	42	42	9	25	16	10	2
Zach Kiekow	28	15	491	491	86	86	27	73	0.37	8	35	0.229	24	31	0.774	8	25	33	33	46	39	37	21	0
Jason Crawford	28	28	306	306	48	48	19	43	0.442	8	22	0.364	2	6	0.333	9	19	28	28	20	31	14	13	2
Thomas Stephens	16	7	142	142	14	14	5	18	0.278	2	10	0.2	2	5	0.4	5	10	15	15	15	16	14	10	0
Alex Liastos	17	0	53	53	10	10	5	9	0.556	0	1	0	0	1	0	4	8	12	12	4	8	2	2	0
Kevin Shorter	7	0	26	26	10	10	5	11	0.455	0	1	0	0	0	0	2	2	4	4	4	3	2	2	1
Total	28	-	5600	-	2104	75.1	741	1531	0.484	168	451	0.373	454	666	0.682	302	637	939	33.5	399	0	395	216	109
Opponents	28	-	5600	-	2014	71.9	692	1575	0.439			-			-			936	33.4					

Legend
GP	Games played	GS	Games started	Avg	Average per game
FG	Field-goals made	FGA	Field-goal attempts	Off	Offensive rebounds
Def	Defensive rebounds	A	Assists	TO	Turnovers
Blk	Blocks	Stl	Steals	High	Team high

== Awards and honors ==
=== All-MAC Awards ===
Postseason All-MAC teams
Team	Player	Position	Year
All-MAC First Team	Brandon Hunter	F	Jr.
