= 2001–02 Eastern Michigan Eagles men's basketball team =

American college basketball season

2001–02 Eastern Michigan Eagles men's basketball
- Conference: Mid-American Conference
- West Division
- Record: 6–24 (2–16 MAC)
- Head coach: Jim Boone (2 season)
- Home arena: Convocation Center

2001–02 Mid-American Conference men's basketball standings
	Conf.				Overall
Team	W		L	PCT	W		L	PCT
East
Kent State†	17	–	1	.944	30	–	6	.833
Bowling Green	12	–	6	.667	24	–	9	.727
Ohio	11	–	7	.611	17	–	11	.607
Miami (OH)	9	–	9	.500	13	–	18	.419
Marshall	8	–	10	.444	15	–	15	.500
Buffalo	7	–	11	.389	12	–	18	.400
Akron	5	–	13	.278	10	–	21	.323
West
Ball State	12	–	6	.667	23	–	12	.657
Toledo	11	–	7	.611	16	–	14	.533
Western Michigan	10	–	8	.556	17	–	13	.567
Northern Illinois	8	–	10	.444	12	–	16	.429
Central Michigan	5	–	13	.278	9	–	19	.321
Eastern Michigan	2	–	16	.111	6	–	24	.200
† 2002 MAC tournament winner Rankings from AP Poll

The 2001–02 Eastern Michigan Eagles men's basketball team represented Eastern Michigan University during the 2001–02 NCAA Division I men's basketball season. The Eagles, led by 2nd year head coach Jim Boone. The Eagles played their home games at the Eastern Michigan University Convocation Center and were members of the West Division of the Mid-American Conference. They finished the season 6–24, 2–16 in MAC play. They finished 6th in the MAC West. They were knocked out in the 1st round of the MAC Tournament by the Toledo Rockets.

== Roster ==
The team captains were Ricky Cottrill, Steve Pettyjohn and Ryan Prillman.

Number	Name	Position	Height	Weight	Year	Home Town
3	Michael Ross	Guard	5–10	180	Freshman	Beckley, WV
12	Melvin Hicks	Guard	6–3	200	Junior	Romulus, MI
14	Ricky Cottrill	Guard	6–3	195	Sophomore	Poca, WV
22	James "Boo" Jackson	Forward	6–9	220	Freshman	Pittsburgh, PA
24	Ben Romano	Guard	6–4	220	Junior	Luanada, Angola
25	Markus Austin	Forward	6–6	215	Freshman	White Plains, NY
32	Avery Jessup	Guard	6–4	200	Freshman	Westland, MI
34	Adam Sommer	Forward	6–6	225	Freshman	Columbus, OH
44	Ryan Prillman	Forward	6–9	245	Junior	New Orleans, LA
45	Tyson Radney	Forward	6–8	215	Senior	Inkster, MI
50	Steve Pettyjohn	Forward	6–8	235	Junior	Wooster, OH
55	Ryan Stennet	Center	6–10	235	Freshman	Royal Oak, MI

== Schedule ==
Date time, TV	Opponent	Result	Record	Site (attendance) city, state
Regular Season
11-17-2001*; 6:30 pm	vs. UAB; Paradise Jam	L 66–79	0–1	Sports and Fitness Center; Saint Thomas, U.S. Virgin Islands
11–18–01*; 6:30 pm	at Miami (FL); Paradise Jam	L 56–93	0–2	Sports and Fitness Center (1121); Saint Thomas, U.S. Virgin Islands
11–20–01*; 12:30 pm	vs. Morris Brown; Paradise Jam	W 67–55	1–2	Sports and Fitness Center (168); Saint Thomas, U.S. Virgin Islands
11–26–01*; 7:05 pm	Maryland Eastern Shore	L 61–65	1–3	Convocation Center (1753); Ypsilanti, MI
12–01–01*; 7:00 pm	Tennessee Tech	L 79–86	1–4	Convocation Center (1875); Ypsilanti, MI
12–03–01*; 7:05 pm	Detroit	L 69–95	1–5	Convocation Center (3532); Ypsilanti, MI
12–08–01*; 7:00 pm	Delaware State	W 75–62	2–5	Convocation Center (1683); Ypsilanti, MI
12–11–01*; 7:05 pm	at Green Bay	W 106–76	2–6	Brown County Arena (2761); Green Bay, WI
12–19–01*; 7:05 pm	Concordia (MI)	L 68–84	3–6	Convocation Center (856); Ypsilanti, MI
12–22–01*; 2:00 pm	at Michigan	L 55–88	3–7	Crisler Arena (10873); Ann Arbor, MI
12–29–01*; 7:05 pm	Western Carolina	W 72–59	4–7	Convocation Center (877); Ypsilanti, MI
01–02–02; 7:00 pm	Buffalo	L 51–70	4–8 (0–1)	Convocation Center (1250); Ypsilanti, MI
01–05–01; 7:00 pm	Ball State	L 45–63	4–9 (0–2)	Convocation Center (2354); Ypsilanti, MI
01–07–02; 7:30 pm	at Akron	W 61–60	5–9 (1–2)	James A. Rhodes Arena (1890); Akron, OH
01–09–02; 7:00 pm	Toledo	L 60–85	5–10 (1–3)	Convocation Center (1959); Ypsilanti, MI
01–12–02; 7:30 pm	at Marshall	L 75–97	5–11 (1–4)	Cam Henderson Center (5417); Huntington, WV
01–16–02; 7:00 pm	at Miami (OH)	L 56–72	5–12 (1–5)	Millett Hall (3110); Oxford, OH
01–19–02; 7:00 pm	Central Michigan	L 73–86	5–13 (1–6)	Convocation Center (3850); Ypsilanti, MI
01–22–02; 7:00 pm	Ohio	L 66–80	5–14 (1–7)	Convocation Center (1017); Ypsilanti, MI
01–26–02; 7:05 pm	at Northern Illinois	L 72–84	5–15 (1–8)	Chick Evans Field House (1925); DeKalb, IL
01–29–02; 7:00 pm	Kent State	L 62–82	5–16 (1–9)	Convocation Center (1581); Ypsilanti, MI
02–02–02; 1:00 pm	at Ball State	L 56–90	5–17 (1–10)	Worthen Arena (6555); Muncie, IN
02–06–02; 7:35 pm	at Western Michigan	L 94–101 ^{2ot}	5–18 (1–11)	University Arena (2034); Kalamazoo, MI
02–09–02; 7:00 pm	Northern Illinois	L 85–90 ^{ot}	5–19 (1–12)	Convocation Center (1975); Ypsilanti, MI
02–13–02; 7:00 pm	Bowling Green	L 61–82	5–20 (1–13)	Anderson Arena (3154); Bowling Green, OH
02–16–02; 7:00 pm	at Akron	W 83–76	6–20 (2–13)	Convocation Center (2590); Ypsilanti, MI
02–20–02; 7:00 pm	at Central Michigan	L 57–76	6–21 (2–14)	Rose Arena (1835); Mt. Pleasant, MI
2–27–02; 7:00 pm	Western Michigan	L 52–71	6–22 (2–15)	Convocation Center (1056); Ypsilanti, MI
03–02–02; 7:00 pm	at Toledo	L 68–84	6–23 (2–16)	Savage Hall (4918); Toledo, OH
2002 MAC men's basketball tournament
03–04–02; 7:00 pm	at Toledo; 1st Round	L 53–89	6–24	Savage Hall (4269); Toledo, OH
*Non-conference game. ^{#}Rankings from AP Poll. (#) Tournament seedings in parentheses. All times are in Eastern Time.

== Season Highlights ==
=== 11/26 vs Maryland Eastern Shore ===
- Ryan Prillman records a career-high 14 rebounds.

=== 12/01 vs Tennessee Tech ===
- Ricky Cottrill sets individual three-point shooting record at EMU Convocation Center with 8 three-point field goal.
- EMU sets a team record with 14 three-point field goals.
- EMU sets a Convocation Center record with 14 three-point field goals.

=== 12/03 vs Detroit ===
- Ryan Prillman scores a career-high 24 points.

=== 01/07 at Akron ===
- Ricky Cottrill scores a career-high 31 points.
- EMU wins its first MAC road game under head coach Jim Boone.
