= 2002 MAC men's basketball tournament =

- Classification: Division I
- Season: 2001–02
- Teams: 13
- Site: Gund Arena; Cleveland, Ohio
- Champions: Kent State (3rd title)
- Winning coach: Stan Heath (1st title)
- MVP: Trevor Huffman (Kent State)
- MAC men's basketball tournaments

2001–02 Mid-American Conference men's basketball standings
| | Conf. | | | | Overall |
| Team | W | | L | PCT | W | | L | PCT |
|---|---|---|---|---|---|---|---|---|
East
| Kent State† | 17 | – | 1 | .944 | 30 | – | 6 | .833 |
| Bowling Green | 12 | – | 6 | .667 | 24 | – | 9 | .727 |
| Ohio | 11 | – | 7 | .611 | 17 | – | 11 | .607 |
| Miami (OH) | 9 | – | 9 | .500 | 13 | – | 18 | .419 |
| Marshall | 8 | – | 10 | .444 | 15 | – | 15 | .500 |
| Buffalo | 7 | – | 11 | .389 | 12 | – | 18 | .400 |
| Akron | 5 | – | 13 | .278 | 10 | – | 21 | .323 |
West
| Ball State | 12 | – | 6 | .667 | 23 | – | 12 | .657 |
| Toledo | 11 | – | 7 | .611 | 16 | – | 14 | .533 |
| Western Michigan | 10 | – | 8 | .556 | 17 | – | 13 | .567 |
| Northern Illinois | 8 | – | 10 | .444 | 12 | – | 16 | .429 |
| Central Michigan | 5 | – | 13 | .278 | 9 | – | 19 | .321 |
| Eastern Michigan | 2 | – | 16 | .111 | 6 | – | 24 | .200 |
† 2002 MAC tournament winner Rankings from AP Poll

The 2002 MAC men's basketball tournament, a part of the 2001–02 NCAA Division I men's basketball season, took place at Gund Arena in Cleveland. Its winner received the Mid-American Conference's automatic bid to the 2002 NCAA tournament. It was a single-elimination tournament with four rounds and the three highest seeds received byes in the first round. All MAC teams were invited to participate. Kent State, the MAC regular season winner, received the number one seed in the tournament. The Flashes won the tournament, their third MAC Tournament championship, claiming the title 70–59 over Bowling Green. The announced crowd of 14,106 set a conference record for highest-attended tournament game. In the NCAA Tournament Kent State defeated Oklahoma State, Alabama, and Pittsburgh before losing to then eventual national runner-up Indiana Hoosiers in the Elite Eight.

== Tournament ==
=== Seeds ===
1. Kent State
2. Ball State
3. Bowling Green
4. Toledo
5. Ohio
6. Western Michigan
7. Miami
8. Marshall
9. Northern Illinois
10. Buffalo
11. Akron
12. Central Michigan
13. Eastern Michigan

=== Bracket ===
First round
8 | Marshall | 97
9 | Northern Illinois | 93
4 | Toledo | 89
13 | Eastern Michigan | 53
5 | Ohio | 56
12 | Central Michigan | 65
7 | Miami (OH) | 70
10 | Buffalo | 61
6 | Western Michigan | 83
11 | Akron | 90

Quarterfinals
1 | Kent State | 86
8 | Marshall | 70
4 | Toledo | 62
12 | Central Michigan | 54
2 | Ball State | 62
7 | Miami (OH) | 50
3 | Bowling Green | 60
11 | Akron | 58

Semifinals
1 | Kent State | 86
4 | Toledo | 61
2 | Ball State | 57
3 | Bowling Green | 69

Championship
1 | Kent State | 70
3 | Bowling Green | 59

== Broadcast Information ==
=== Local announcers ===
| Seed | Teams | Flagship station | Play-by-play announcer | Color analyst(s) |
|---|---|---|---|---|
| 1 | Kent State | WNIR–FM 100.1 | Bill Needle | |
