= Kent State Golden Flashes men's basketball =

College basketball team

2026–27 Kent State Golden Flashes men's basketball team
- University: Kent State University
- First season: 1913; 113 years ago
- Head coach: Rob Senderoff (16th season)
- Location: Kent, Ohio
- Arena: Memorial Athletic and Convocation Center (capacity: 6,327)
- Conference: Mid-American
- Nickname: Golden Flashes
- Colors: Navy blue and gold

NCAA Division I tournament Elite Eight
- 2002
Other NCAA Division I tournament results
Sweet Sixteen	2002
Appearances	1999, 2001, 2002, 2006, 2008, 2017, 2023

Conference tournament champions
- 1999, 2001, 2002, 2006, 2008, 2017, 2023

Conference regular-season champions
- 2002, 2006, 2008, 2010, 2011, 2015

Conference division champions
- 2001, 2002, 2003, 2004, 2006, 2008, 2010, 2011, 2015

Uniforms
Home	Away	Alternate

The Kent State Golden Flashes men's basketball team represents Kent State University in Kent, Ohio, United States. The Golden Flashes compete in National Collegiate Athletic Association (NCAA) at the Division I level as a member of the Mid-American Conference (MAC). The team was founded in 1913 and played their first intercollegiate game in January 1915. They joined the Mid-American Conference in 1951 and played in the MAC East division from 1997 to 2020. Home games are held at the Memorial Athletic and Convocation Center, which opened in 1950 and is one of the oldest arenas in college basketball. Rob Senderoff was hired as head coach in 2011, the 24th coach in the program's history.

The Flashes gained national attention in the late 1990s and early 2000s after earning their first bid to the NCAA Division I men's basketball tournament in 1999. Two years later, Kent State picked up their first tournament win, followed the next year by their run to the Elite Eight in 2002 as a 10th seed where the Flashes finished the season ranked 12th nationally. The 2002 Golden Flashes also set a team record with 30 wins along with a MAC single-season record of 17 conference wins.

Kent State has made seven total appearances in the NCAA tournament, most recently in 2023, along with eight appearances in the National Invitation Tournament (NIT), and six in the CollegeInsider.com Tournament (CIT) and its successor The Basketball Classic (TBC). In MAC play, the Flashes have six regular-season titles, nine East division titles, and seven MAC tournament championships.

== History ==
The men's basketball team is Kent State's oldest collegiate team, founded in 1913 during the first fall semester at the new Kent State Normal School campus. The team was organized, though only five men were enrolled out of the initial enrollment of 140 at the beginning of the term, as the new school was a teacher training college and thus had a predominately female student body. More men would arrive at the school in the coming weeks. They played and won their first game against Kent High School and competed against local company and high school teams for that first season, going 7–2. During the following season, Kent State played its first intercollegiate game, a 56–6 loss to Otterbein College, on January 22, 1915. An additional intercollegiate game, a 54–18 home loss to Muskingum College, was played that year along with three other games against local teams. Kent State's first intercollegiate win was recorded March 10, 1916, a 27–17 home win over Ashland College, played in the former heating plant and manual training building. A shortage of men during both World Wars prevented teams from being formed for the 1917–18, 1918–19, and 1943–44 seasons. Beginning in 1932, Kent State played as a member of the Ohio Athletic Conference before joining the Mid-American Conference and beginning league play in 1951. Kent State was placed in the East Division when the MAC went to a divisional alignment in 1997.

During their first years of existence, a variety of different venues were used for home games including on-campus facilities at what is now Cartwright Hall and the old heating plant, as well as off-campus facilities at the local Congregational Church gymnasium and Theodore Roosevelt High School, until Wills Gymnasium opened in 1925. In 1950, the team moved to their current home, the Memorial Athletic and Convocation Center, known originally as the Men's Physical Education Building until 1956 and later as Memorial Gym until 1992.

The team played in relative anonymity for most of its existence. They made their first appearance in the MAC tournament championship game (which began in 1980) in 1984, losing a close 42–40 game. They would make the title game again in 1987 and 1989, losing both 64–63 and 67–65 respectively. The Flashes made their first post-season appearance in the 1985 National Invitation Tournament, losing in the first round. They returned to the NIT in 1989 and 1990, losing in the first round both times.

=== Beginnings of success ===
In 1996, Gary Waters was hired as head coach and began to build what would become the longest run of success in Mid-American Conference history. In 1999 the Flashes won over 20 games and defeated the Miami RedHawks in the MAC tournament championship game in Toledo to win their first MAC tournament title and make their first-ever NCAA tournament appearance, where they were defeated by Temple in the opening round at FleetCenter in Boston. The following season, the Flashes again won over 20 games and finished second in the MAC East, but failed to win the conference tournament and received their first NIT invitation since 1990. The Flashes hosted the first-round game against Rutgers and recorded their first-ever post-season win, a 73–62 victory. Kent State would win their second-round match-up at Villanova before falling in the quarterfinals at Penn State. The 2000–2001 season saw the Flashes win their first-ever MAC East title and their second tournament title to return to the NCAA tournament. The experience in the NIT proved to be valuable as Kent State scored their first win, a 77–73 upset over the fourth-seeded Indiana Hoosiers, before falling to the Cincinnati Bearcats in the second round in San Diego. At the end of the 2000–01 season, Waters accepted the head coaching job at Rutgers. While at KSU, Waters overall record was 92–60. He was succeeded at Kent State by Stan Heath.

=== 2001–02 season ===
Kent State enjoyed its best season in 2001–02, led by seniors Trevor Huffman, Andrew Mitchell, Demetric Shaw, and Eric Thomas and junior transfer Antonio Gates. The season saw MAC records set in overall wins (30), conference wins (17), and longest winning streak (21). After beginning the season 4–4, Kent State won 20 of their next 21 games. Following their only MAC loss of the season (a 66–65 loss at Buffalo), they proceeded to win 15 straight games to close the regular season at 24–5 with a 17–1 record in the MAC and winning their first-ever MAC regular season title. After winning the 2002 MAC men's basketball tournament, the Flashes qualified for the 2002 NCAA Division I men's basketball tournament and were seeded tenth in the South regional bracket. After scoring a mild upset of the seventh-seeded Oklahoma State Cowboys, the Flashes gained national attention by defeating second-seeded SEC champion Alabama 71–58 to advance to the Sweet Sixteen. The Flashes followed that win with a 78–73 overtime win over third-seeded Pitt to become the first MAC team to advance to the Elite Eight since Ohio in 1964, when the tournament contained only 22 teams. The Flashes' 21-game winning streak and season came to an end in the Elite Eight with an 81–69 loss to Indiana. The Flashes finished the season at 30–6 and were ranked 12th in the final ESPN/USA Today Coaches poll released after the tournament. Following the season, Stan Heath accepted the head coaching job at the University of Arkansas, leaving after just one season and a record of 30–6. Assistant coach Jim Christian was hired later that year as the next head coach.

=== Jim Christian ===
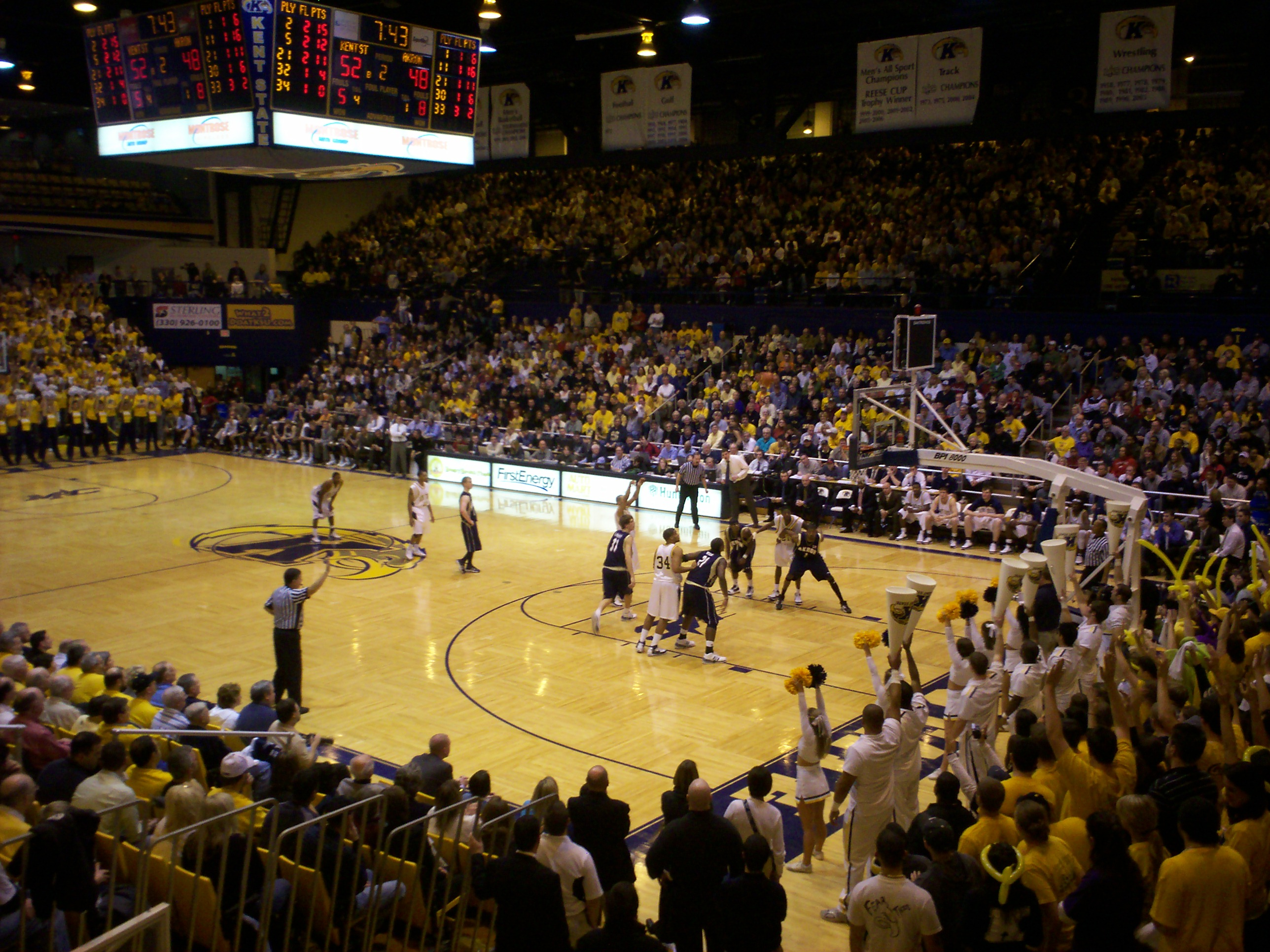
KSU versus the Akron Zips on January 23, 2008, at the MAC Center

The Flashes continued their success under Jim Christian, winning over 20 games every season he was coach along with MAC East titles in 2003, 2004, 2006, and 2008; MAC overall titles in 2006 and 2008; and winning the MAC tournament again in 2006 and 2008. In both 2003 and 2004, Kent State lost in the MAC tournament championship game and received bids to the NIT. Following their 2006 MAC tournament title, they advanced to the 2006 NCAA Division I men's basketball tournament as a 12th seed where they lost in the opening round. In 2004, Kent State broke the MAC record for consecutive seasons with 20 or more wins by posting their sixth consecutive season. The streak is currently at ten as the 2007–2008 team won their 20th game on February 12, 2008 at Central Michigan University. In addition, Kent State broke the record for consecutive seasons with ten or more conference wins in a season by posting their ninth consecutive season of ten or more conference wins in 2006–2007, breaking the previous record of eight. The 2007–2008 season has seen several firsts and milestones for the program. On February 19, 2008, the Flashes recorded their 1,000th win in program history, a 76–66 win over the Buffalo Bulls at Buffalo's Alumni Arena. On February 24, the Flashes scored their first-ever win against a ranked team in the regular season, defeating the Saint Mary's Gaels 65–57 in Moraga, California. This was followed by Kent State's first-ever regular season ranking, rising to 23rd in the Associated Press poll and 24th in the ESPN/USA Today Coaches Poll. With their 61–58 win at Akron on March 9 to close out the regular season, Kent State set a program record for wins in the regular season with 25, breaking the previous record of 24 set in the 2001–2002 season. Following their fifth conference tournament title, Kent State earned the highest seed in school history, a ninth seed in the Midwestern region of the 2008 NCAA tournament, where they fell to the UNLV Runnin' Rebels in the opening round. On March 29 Jim Christian resigned to take the head coaching job at Texas Christian University. He finished with a career record of 138–58 at Kent State. Christian was replaced by his top assistant coach Geno Ford, who officially took over the program on April 2.

=== Geno Ford ===
Geno Ford took over the program in 2008 and led the team to three winning seasons, including two regular season MAC Championships in the 2009–10 and 2010–11 seasons. It was the first time a team had won successive MAC regular season championships since Miami in 1991 and 1992 and the first time a team had won two consecutive outright titles since Ball State in 1989 and 1990. In 2011, KSU appeared in their 11th MAC tournament championship game, but fell in overtime. Although the team failed to advance to the NCAA tournament during Ford's tenure, they did have three consecutive post-season appearances including the 2009 CollegeInsider.com Tournament and the 2010 and 2011 NITs. Kent State advanced to the second round of the 2010 NIT, winning their first post-season game since the 2002 Elite Eight run, and advanced to the quarterfinals of the 2011 NIT with two road wins. Ford left the team to take the head coaching job at Bradley University on March 27, 2011. Ford finished with a 68–37 record at Kent State.

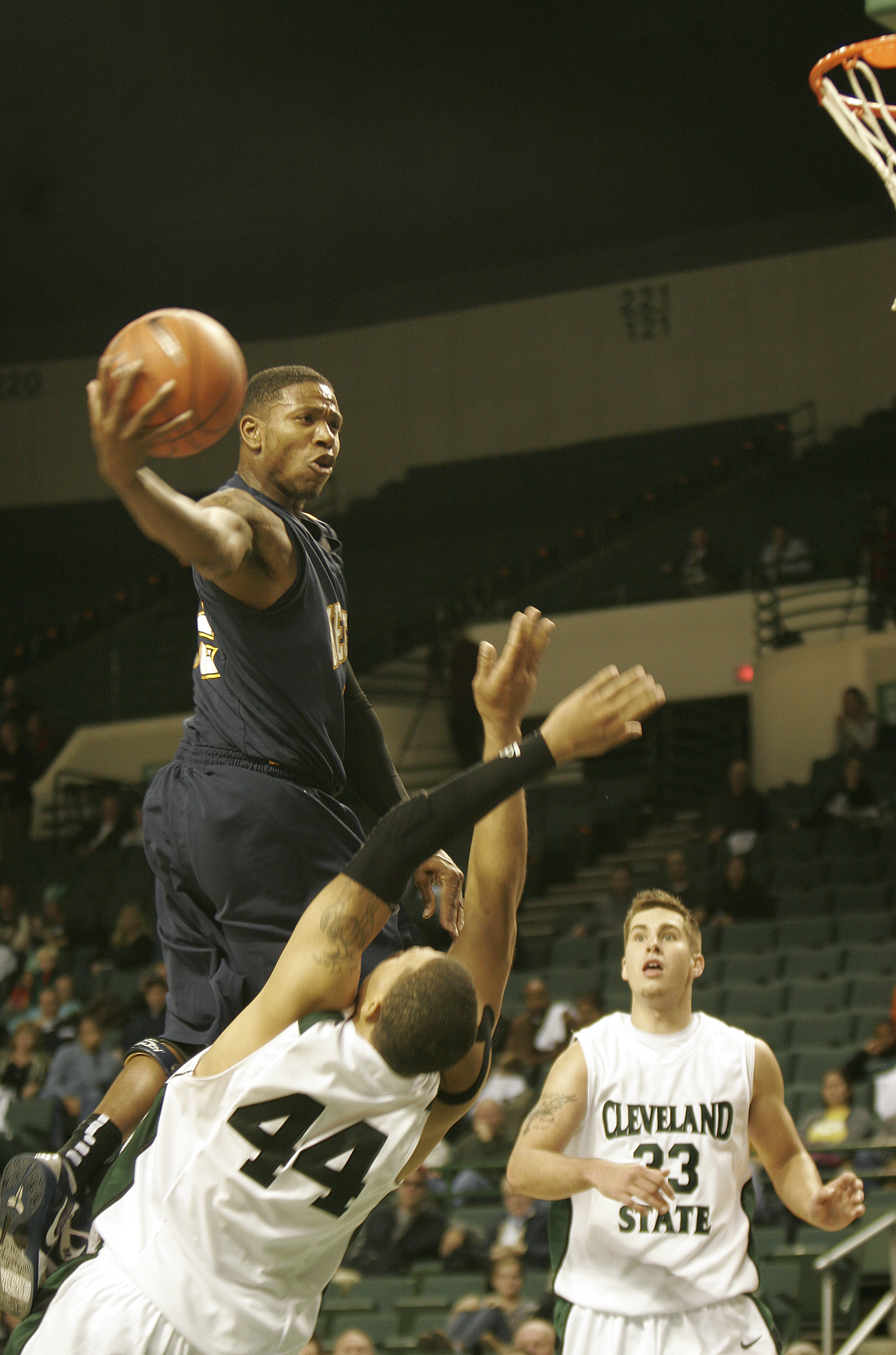
A Kent State player drives against Cleveland State in 2010

=== Rob Senderoff ===
Rob Senderoff, succeeded Ford as head coach on April 7, 2011 after briefly serving as interim head coach after Ford's departure. Senderoff had worked as an assistant at Kent State with Ford under Jim Christian from 2002–06 before joining the staff of Kelvin Sampson at Indiana as an assistant. Following the Kelvin Sampson recruiting controversy, Senderoff was issued a three-year show-cause penalty by the NCAA and forced to resign at Indiana. He was rehired at Kent State in 2008 as associate head coach. In his first two seasons as head coach, the Flashes continued some of their recent success, winning 20 games in each season and advancing to the CollegeInsider.com Postseason Tournament in 2012. The 2012–13 season was Kent State's first season not winning at least 10 MAC games since the 1997–98 season, though the team did advance to the 2013 CollegeInsider.com Postseason Tournament where they finished 1–1. The 2013–14 team struggled to a 16–16 record and 7–11 record in MAC play, the team's worst season since a 13–17 overall record in 1997–98 and worst MAC record since a 7–11 mark in 1996–97.

Jimmy Hall played for the team in 2014-17, and his career 8.69 rebounds per game were 7th-highest in the MAC. Hall was the only Kent player to ever finish his career with 1,600 points and 800 rebounds, and his 1,683 career points are third-most in Kent history. His 672 field goals are the most in school history, and his 867 rebounds are second in school history.

During Senderoff's tenure, the Flashes became the first Division I program in any team sport to sign a recruit diagnosed with autism to a National Letter of Intent. Kalin Bennett, a center from Little Rock, Arkansas, was signed in November 2018 and arrived on campus in August 2019, making his debut in the last minutes of the Flashes' 2019–20 season opener.

=== MAC season results ===
As Mid-American Conference member
Season	Overall record*	MAC tournament record**	Postseason record	Head coach
1951–52	14–10 (3–7)	–	–	Clarence Haerr
1952–53	7–15 (3–9)	–	–	Clarence Haerr
1953–54	8–13 (3–9)	–	–	Clarence Haerr
1954–55	8–14 (5–9)	–	–	Clarence Haerr
1955–56	10–11 (5–7)	–	–	Dave McDowell
1956–57	5–18 (2–10)	–	–	Dave McDowell
1957–58	9–14 (3–9)	–	–	Bill Bertka
1958–59	11–13 (6–6)	–	–	Bill Bertka
1959–60	7–16 (2–10)	–	–	Bill Bertka
1960–61	9–14 (4–8)	–	–	Bill Bertka
1961–62	2–19 (1–11)	–	–	Bob Doll
1962–63	3–18 (1–11)	–	–	Bob Doll
1963–64	11–13 (5–7)	–	–	Bob Doll
1964–65	9–11 (4–8)	–	–	Bob Doll
1965–66	8–16 (3–9)	–	–	Bob Doll
1966–67	5–18 (1–11)	–	–	Frank Truitt
1967–68	9–15 (3–9)	–	–	Frank Truitt
1968–69	14–10 (6–6)	–	–	Frank Truitt
1969–70	7–17 (2–8)	–	–	Frank Truitt
1970–71	13–11 (4–6)	–	–	Frank Truitt
1971–72	7–17 (6–4)	–	–	Frank Truitt
1972–73	10–16 (5–7)	–	–	Frank Truitt
1973–74	9–17 (1–11)	–	–	Frank Truitt
1974–75	6–20 (3–11)	–	–	Rex Hughes
1975–76	12–14 (7–9)	–	–	Rex Hughes
1976–77	8–19 (4–12)	–	–	Rex Hughes
1977–78	6–21 (4–12)	–	–	Rex Hughes/Mike Boyd
1978–79	13–14 (7–9)	–	–	Ed Douma
1979–80	10–17 (7–9)	0–1; Lost in quarterfinal	–	Ed Douma
1980–81	7–19 (5–11)	Did not qualify	–	Ed Douma
1981–82	10–16 (6–10)	Did not qualify	–	Ed Douma
1982–83	15–13 (9–9)	0–1; Lost in quarterfinal	–	Jim McDonald
1983–84	15–14 (8–10)	2–1; Lost in final	–	Jim McDonald
1984–85	17–13 (11–7)	1–1; Lost in semifinal	0–1 in NIT	Jim McDonald
1985–86	11–16 (7–11)	Did not qualify	–	Jim McDonald
1986–87	19–10 (11–5)	2–1; Lost in final	–	Jim McDonald
1987–88	10–18 (6–10)	0–1; Lost in quarterfinal	–	Jim McDonald
1988–89	21–10 (12–4)	2–1; Lost in final	0–1 in NIT	Jim McDonald
1989–90	21–8 (12–4)	0–1; Lost in quarterfinal	0–1 in NIT	Jim McDonald
1990–91	10–18 (4–12)	0–1; Lost in quarterfinal	–	Jim McDonald
1991–92	9–19 (6–10)	0–1; Lost in quarterfinal	–	Jim McDonald
1992–93	10–17 (7–11)	0–1; Lost in quarterfinal	–	Dave Grube
1993–94	13–14 (8–10)	0–1; Lost in quarterfinal	–	Dave Grube
1994–95	8–19 (5–13)	0–1; Lost in quarterfinal	–	Dave Grube
1995–96	8–10 (14–13)	0–1; Lost in quarterfinal	–	Dave Grube
1996–97	9–18 (7–11)	0–1; Lost in quarterfinal	–	Gary Waters
1997–98	13–17 (9–9)	1–1; Lost in semifinal	–	Gary Waters
1998–99	23–7 (13–5)	3–0; Won tournament	0–1 in NCAA tournament	Gary Waters
1999–2000	23–8 (13–5)	0–1; Lost in quarterfinal	2–1 in NIT	Gary Waters
2000–01	24–10 (13–5)	3–0; Won tournament	1–1 in NCAA tournament	Gary Waters
2001–02	30–6 (17–1)	3–0; Won tournament	3–1 in NCAA tournament	Stan Heath
2002–03	22–9 (12–6)	2–1; Lost in final	0–1 in NIT	Jim Christian
2003–04	22–8 (13–5)	2–1; Lost in final	0–1 in NIT	Jim Christian
2004–05	20–13 (11–7)	1–1; Lost in quarterfinal	0–1 in NIT	Jim Christian
2005–06	25–9 (15–3)	3–0; Won tournament	0–1 in NCAA tournament	Jim Christian
2006–07	21–11 (12–4)	1–1; Lost in semifinal	–	Jim Christian
2007–08	28–7 (13–3)	3–0; Won tournament	0–1 in NCAA tournament	Jim Christian
2008–09	19–15 (10–6)	1–1; Lost in quarterfinals	0–1 in CIT	Geno Ford
2009–10	24–10 (13–3)	0–1; Lost in quarterfinal	1–1 in NIT	Geno Ford
2010–11	25–12 (12–4)	2–1; Lost in final	2–1 in NIT	Geno Ford
2011–12	21–12 (10–6)	1–1; Lost in semifinal	0–1 in CIT	Rob Senderoff
2012–13	21–14 (9–7)	1–1; Lost in semifinal	1–1 in CIT	Rob Senderoff
2013–14	16–16 (7–11)	0–1; Lost in first round	–	Rob Senderoff
2014–15	23–12 (12–6)	0–1; Lost in quarterfinal	2–1 in CIT	Rob Senderoff
2015–16	19–13 (10–8)	0–1; Lost in first round	–	Rob Senderoff
2016–17	22–14 (10–8)	4–0; Won tournament	0–1 in NCAA tournament	Rob Senderoff
2017–18	17–17 (9–9)	2–1; Lost in semifinal	–	Rob Senderoff
2018–19	22–11 (11–7)	0–1; Lost in quarterfinal	0–1 in CIT	Rob Senderoff
2019–20	20–12 (9–9)	1–0; Canceled after first round	No postseason held	Rob Senderoff
2020–21	15–8 (12–6)	0–1; Lost in quarterfinal	–	Rob Senderoff
2021–22	23–11 (16–4)	2–1; Lost in final	0–1 in TBC	Rob Senderoff
2022–23	28–7 (15–3)	3–0; Won tournament	0–1 in NCAA tournament	Rob Senderoff
2023–24	17–17 (8–10)	2–1; Lost in final	–	Rob Senderoff
2024–25	24–12 (11–7)	1–1; Lost in semifinal	2–1 in NIT	Rob Senderoff
2025–26	24–10 (14–4)	1–1; Lost in semifinal	0–1 in NIT	Rob Senderoff

Overall conference titles shaded in ██ gold. East division titles shaded in ██ light yellow.
* – Overall record includes tournament and postseason results; Regular-season conference record contained in parentheses.
** – The MAC tournament was first held in 1980. From 2000–20, it included all conference members.

== MAC tournament ==
Kent State has appeared in all but three Mid-American Conference tournaments since the tournament began in 1980 and through 2025 has an overall record of 49–35 in tournament play. Through 2024, the Flashes have appeared in 15 MAC title games, winning seven. The seven tournament championships are tied for most in conference history with Ohio and Ball State. The 15 title game appearances are the most in conference history.

Year	Seed	Arena	Location	Round	Result
1980	4th	Memorial Gym	Kent, Ohio	Quarterfinal	L 73–71 to (5) Ball State
1983	6th	Centennial Hall	Toledo, Ohio	Quarterfinal	L 79–64 to (3) Toledo
1984	7th	Rockford MetroCentre	Rockford, Illinois	Quarterfinal	W 57–53 over (2) Ohio
1984	7th	Rockford MetroCentre	Rockford, Illinois	Semifinal	W 67–58 over (6) Eastern Michigan
1984	7th	Rockford MetroCentre	Rockford, Illinois	Final	L 42–40 to (1) Miami
1985	4th	Centennial Hall	Toledo, Ohio	Quarterfinal	W 85–74 over (2) Eastern Michigan
1985	4th	Centennial Hall	Toledo, Ohio	Semifinal	L 57–55 to (1) Ohio
1987	2nd	Centennial Hall	Toledo, Ohio	Quarterfinal	W 84–75 over (2) Western Michigan
1987	2nd	Centennial Hall	Toledo, Ohio	Semifinal	W 66–59 over (3) Bowling Green
1987	2nd	Centennial Hall	Toledo, Ohio	Final	L 64–63 to (1) Central Michigan
1988	7th	Rose Arena	Mount Pleasant, Michigan	Quarterfinal	L 66–56 to (2) Central Michigan
1989	2nd	Savage Hall	Toledo, Ohio	Quarterfinal	W 65–56 over (7) Bowling Green
1989	2nd	Savage Hall	Toledo, Ohio	Semifinal	W 88–43 over (3) Toledo
1989	2nd	Savage Hall	Toledo, Ohio	Final	L 67–65 to (1) Ball State
1990	2nd	Cobo Arena	Detroit	Quarterfinal	L 82–65 to (7) Central Michigan
1991	8th	Cobo Arena	Detroit	Quarterfinal	L 66–47 to (1) Eastern Michigan
1992	6th	Cobo Arena	Detroit	Quarterfinal	L 61–57 to (3) Western Michigan
1993	8th	Battelle Hall	Columbus, Ohio	Quarterfinal	L 77–57 to (1) Ball State
1994	7th	Anderson Arena	Bowling Green, Ohio	Quarterfinal	L 68–58 to (2) Bowling Green
1995	8th	Millett Hall	Oxford, Ohio	Quarterfinal	L 77–49 to (1) Miami
1996	8th	Bowen Field House	Ypsilanti, Michigan	Quarterfinal	L 84–72 to (1) Eastern Michigan
1997	7th	Millett Hall	Oxford, Ohio	Quarterfinal	L 75–65 to (2) Miami
1998	6th	James A. Rhodes Arena	Akron, Ohio	Quarterfinal	W 95–88 over (3) Akron
1998	6th	SeaGate Centre	Toledo, Ohio	Semifinal	L 64–59 to (7) Miami
1999	2nd	MAC Center	Kent, Ohio	Quarterfinal	W 79–76 over (7) Marshall
1999	2nd	SeaGate Centre	Toledo, Ohio	Semifinal	W 68–57 over (3) Ohio
1999	2nd	SeaGate Centre	Toledo, Ohio	Final	W 49–43 over (1) Miami
2000	3rd	Gund Arena	Cleveland	Quarterfinal	L 69–68 to (6) Ohio
2001	2nd	Gund Arena	Cleveland	Quarterfinal	W 71–64 over (7) Bowling Green
2001	2nd	Gund Arena	Cleveland	Semifinal	W 67–55 over (6) Ball State
2001	2nd	Gund Arena	Cleveland	Final	W 67–61 over (8) Miami
2002	1st	Gund Arena	Cleveland	Quarterfinal	W 82–70 over (8) Marshall
2002	1st	Gund Arena	Cleveland	Semifinal	W 86–61 over (4) Toledo
2002	1st	Gund Arena	Cleveland	Final	W 70–59 over (3) Bowling Green
2003	2nd	Gund Arena	Cleveland	Quarterfinal	W 79–57 over (7) Marshall
2003	2nd	Gund Arena	Cleveland	Semifinal	W 73–70 over (11) Ohio
2003	2nd	Gund Arena	Cleveland	Final	L 77–72 to (1) Central Michigan
2004	2nd	Gund Arena	Cleveland	Quarterfinal	W 79–66 over (7) Bowling Green
2004	2nd	Gund Arena	Cleveland	Semifinal	W 66–56 over (3) Miami
2004	2nd	Gund Arena	Cleveland	Final	L 77–66 to (1) Western Michigan
2005	5th	MAC Center	Kent, Ohio	Opening	W 91–60 over (12) Central Michigan
2005	5th	Gund Arena	Cleveland	Quarterfinal	L 62–55 to (4) Ohio
2006	1st	Quicken Loans Arena	Cleveland	Quarterfinal	W 76–67 over (8) Buffalo
2006	1st	Quicken Loans Arena	Cleveland	Semifinal	W 72–59 over (5) Ohio
2006	1st	Quicken Loans Arena	Cleveland	Final	W 71–66 over (7) Toledo
2007	3rd	Quicken Loans Arena	Cleveland	Quarterfinal	W 75–66 over (6) Western Michigan
2007	3rd	Quicken Loans Arena	Cleveland	Semifinal	L 61–54 to (2) Akron
2008	1st	Quicken Loans Arena	Cleveland	Quarterfinal	W 77–57 over (8) Toledo
2008	1st	Quicken Loans Arena	Cleveland	Semifinal	W 49–47 over (5) Miami
2008	1st	Quicken Loans Arena	Cleveland	Final	W 74–55 over (3) Akron
2009	6th	Quicken Loans Arena	Cleveland	Opening	W 64–61 over (11) Northern Illinois
2009	6th	Quicken Loans Arena	Cleveland	Quarterfinal	L 65–62 to (3) Buffalo
2010	1st	Quicken Loans Arena	Cleveland	Quarterfinal	L 81–64 to (9) Ohio
2011	1st	Quicken Loans Arena	Cleveland	Quarterfinal	W 73–62 over (8) Buffalo
2011	1st	Quicken Loans Arena	Cleveland	Semifinal	W 79–68 over (4) Ball State
2011	1st	Quicken Loans Arena	Cleveland	Final	L 66–65 OT to (6) Akron
2012	4th	Quicken Loans Arena	Cleveland	Quarterfinal	W 76–72 over (8) Western Michigan
2012	4th	Quicken Loans Arena	Cleveland	Semifinal	L 78–74 to (1) Akron
2013	4th	Quicken Loans Arena	Cleveland	Quarterfinal	W 70–68 over (8) Buffalo
2013	4th	Quicken Loans Arena	Cleveland	Semifinal	L 62–59 to (1) Akron
2014	9th	Millett Hall	Oxford, Ohio	First round	L 71–64 to (8) Miami
2015	3rd	Quicken Loans Arena	Cleveland	Quarterfinal	L 53–51 to (7) Akron
2016	5th	MAC Center	Kent, Ohio	First round	L 70–69 to (12) Bowling Green
2017	6th	MAC Center	Kent, Ohio	First round	W 116–106 OT over (11) Central Michigan
2017	6th	Quicken Loans Arena	Cleveland	Quarterfinal	W 68–65 over (3) Buffalo
2017	6th	Quicken Loans Arena	Cleveland	Semifinal	W 68–66 over (2) Ohio
2017	6th	Quicken Loans Arena	Cleveland	Final	W 70–65 over (1) Akron
2018	5th	MAC Center	Kent, Ohio	First round	W 61–59 over (12) Northern Illinois
2018	5th	Quicken Loans Arena	Cleveland	Quarterfinal	W 76–73 over (4) Ball State
2018	5th	Quicken Loans Arena	Cleveland	Semifinal	L 78–61 to (1) Buffalo
2019	4th	Quicken Loans Arena	Cleveland	First round	L 89–81 to (5) Central Michigan
2020	6th	MAC Center	Kent, Ohio	First round	W 86–76 over (11) Eastern Michigan
2020	6th	Rocket Mortgage FieldHouse	Cleveland	Quarterfinal	vs. (3) Ball State (Canceled)
2021	4th	Rocket Mortgage FieldHouse	Cleveland	Quarterfinal	L 85–63 to (5) Ohio
2022	2nd	Rocket Mortgage FieldHouse	Cleveland	Quarterfinal	W 85–75 over (7) Miami
2022	2nd	Rocket Mortgage FieldHouse	Cleveland	Semifinal	W 67–61 over (3) Ohio
2022	2nd	Rocket Mortgage FieldHouse	Cleveland	Final	L 75–55 to (4) Akron
2023	2nd	Rocket Mortgage FieldHouse	Cleveland	Quarterfinal	W 76-57 over (7) Northern Illinois
2023	2nd	Rocket Mortgage FieldHouse	Cleveland	Semifinal	W 79–73 over (3) Akron
2023	2nd	Rocket Mortgage FieldHouse	Cleveland	Final	W 93–78 over (1) Toledo
2024	8th	Rocket Mortgage FieldHouse	Cleveland	Quarterfinal	W 67–59 over (1) Toledo
2024	8th	Rocket Mortgage FieldHouse	Cleveland	Semifinal	W 73–60 over (5) Bowling Green
2024	8th	Rocket Mortgage FieldHouse	Cleveland	Final	L 62–61 to (2) Akron
2025	3rd	Rocket Arena	Cleveland	Quarterfinal	W 73–66 over (6) Western Michigan
2025	3rd	Rocket Arena	Cleveland	Semifinal	L 72–64 to (2) Miami
2026	3rd	Rocket Arena	Cleveland	Quarterfinal	W 86–75 over (6) Ohio
2026	3rd	Rocket Arena	Cleveland	Semifinal	L 75–68 to (2) Akron
Totals:		44 appearances		7 championships 15 finals appearances 50–36 record in tournament	

== Postseason ==
=== NCAA tournament ===
The Golden Flashes have appeared in seven NCAA tournaments. Their combined record is 4–7.

Year	Seed	Arena	Location	Region	Round	Result
1999	11th	FleetCenter	Boston	East	First	L 61–54 to (6) Temple
2001	13th	Cox Arena	San Diego	West	First	W 77–73 over (4) Indiana
2001	13th	Cox Arena	San Diego	West	Second	L 66–43 to (5) Cincinnati
2002	10th	BI-LO Center	Greenville, South Carolina	South	First	W 69–61 over (7) Oklahoma State
2002	10th	BI-LO Center	Greenville, South Carolina	South	Second	W 71–58 over (2) Alabama
2002	10th	Rupp Arena	Lexington, Kentucky	South	Sweet Sixteen	W 78–73 (OT) over (3) Pitt
2002	10th	Rupp Arena	Lexington, Kentucky	South	Elite Eight	L 81–69 to (5) Indiana
2006	12th	The Palace of Auburn Hills	Auburn Hills, Michigan	Oakland	First	L 79–64 to (5) Pitt
2008	9th	Qwest Center Omaha	Omaha, Nebraska	Midwest	First	L 71–58 to (8) UNLV
2017	14th	Golden 1 Center	Sacramento, California	South	First	L 97–80 to (3) UCLA
2023	13th	MVP Arena	Albany, New York	Midwest	First	L 60-71 vs (4) Indiana

==== NIT ====
Kent State has appeared in 10 National Invitation Tournaments. Their combined record is 7–10.

Year	Seed	Arena	Location	Region	Round	Result
1985	—	Riverfront Coliseum	Cincinnati, Ohio	—	First	L 77–61 to Cincinnati
1989	—	Cobo Arena	Detroit, Michigan	—	First	L 83–69 to Michigan State
1990	—	St. Louis Arena	St. Louis, Missouri	—	First	L 85–74 to Saint Louis
2000	—	MAC Center	Kent, Ohio	—	First	W 73–62 over Rutgers
2000	—	The Pavilion	Villanova, Pennsylvania	—	Second	W 81–67 over Villanova
2000	—	Bryce Jordan Center	University Park, Pennsylvania	—	Quarterfinal	L 81–74 to Penn State
2003	—	MAC Center	Kent, Ohio	—	Opening	L 72–66 to College of Charleston
2004	—	MAC Center	Kent, Ohio	—	Opening	L 65–54 to West Virginia
2005	—	E. A. Diddle Arena	Bowling Green, Kentucky	—	Opening	L 88–80 (OT) to Western Kentucky
2010	4th	MAC Center	Kent, Ohio	Illinois	First	W 75–74 over (5) Tulsa
2010	4th	Assembly Hall	Champaign, Illinois	Illinois	Second	L 75–58 to (1) Illinois
2011	7th	McKeon Pavilion	Moraga, California	Colorado	First	W 71–70 over (2) Saint Mary's
2011	7th	Webster Bank Arena	Bridgeport, Connecticut	Colorado	Second	W 72–68 over (6) Fairfield
2011	7th	Coors Events Center	Boulder, Colorado	Colorado	Quarterfinal	L 81–74 to (1) Colorado
2025	—	Reilly Center	St. Bonaventure, New York	San Francisco	First	W 75–57 over (3) St. Bonaventure
2025	—	Maples Pavilion	Stanford, California	San Francisco	Second	W 77–75 over (2) Stanford
2025	—	Joseph J. Gentile Arena	Chicago, Illinois	San Francisco	Quarterfinal	L 72–72 to Loyola Chicago
2026	—	CEFCU Arena	Normal, Illinois	Winston-Salem	First	L 79–58 to (4) Illinois State

==== CollegeInsider.com Tournament and The Basketball Classic ====
Kent State appeared in the CollegeInsider.com Tournament five times with a record of 3–5. They have made one appearance in The Basketball Classic, the successor to the CollegeInsider.com Tournament, and have a record of 0–1.

Year	Arena	Location	Round	Result
2009	Athletics Center O'rena	Rochester, Michigan	First	L 80–74 to Oakland
2012	G. B. Hodge Center	Spartanburg, South Carolina	First	L 73–58 to USC Upstate
2013	MAC Center	Kent, Ohio	First	W 73–71 over Fairfield
2013	Reitz Arena	Baltimore	Second	L 73–59 to Loyola (MD)
2015	Murphy Center	Murfreesboro, Tennessee	First	W 68–56 over Middle Tennessee
2015	American Bank Center	Corpus Christi, Texas	Second	W 69–65 over Texas A&M–Corpus Christi
2015	Walkup Skydome	Flagstaff, Arizona	Quarterfinals	L 74–73 ^{OT} to Northern Arizona
2019	Fant-Ewing Coliseum	Monroe, Louisiana	First	L 87–77 to Louisiana–Monroe

Year	Arena	Location	Round	Result
2022	America First Event Center	Cedar City, Utah	First	L 83–79 to Southern Utah

== Awards ==
MAC Player of the Year
Name	Year
DeAndre Haynes	2006
Al Fisher	2008
Justin Greene	2011
Sincere Carry	2022
MAC Defensive Player of the Year
Demetric Shaw	2001, 2002
John Edwards	2004
Haminn Quaintance	2008
Michael Porrini	2011
Malique Jacobs	2023
MAC Sixth Player Award
Name	Year
Kevin Warzynski	2006
Anthony Simpson	2010
Carlton Guyton	2011
Justyn Hamilton	2022
Jalen Sullinger	2023
MAC Freshman of the Year
Harold Walton	1989

Academic All-MAC Selections
Name	Year
Rick Gates	1973
Doug Sheil	1973
Dennis Odle	1974
David Zeigler	1983
Russ Kotalac	1985
Russ Kotalac	1986
Ric Blevins	1989
Eric Glenn	1989
Ric Blevins	1990
Eric Glenn	1990
Harold Walton	1990
Mike Klinzing	1991
Mike Klinzing	1992
Rod Koch	1994
Scott Effertz	1997
Scott Effertz	1998
Bryan Bedford	2003
Armon Gates	2007
Mitch Peterson	2018
Mitch Peterson	2019
Mitch Peterson	2020
Evan Bainbridge	2021
Mike Bekelja	2023
Magnus Entenmen	2023
Julius Rollins	2023
Mike Bekelja	2025
Magnus Entenmen	2025

MAC Coach of the Year
Name	Year
Jim McDonald	1990
Gary Waters	1999, 2000
Stan Heath	2002
Jim Christian	2006, 2008
Geno Ford	2010, 2011
Rob Senderoff	2022

=== All-Americans ===
All-America
Name	Year	Team
Anthony Grier	1985	Honorable Mention
Antonio Gates	2003	Honorable Mention
DeAndre Haynes	2006	Honorable Mention
Al Fisher	2008	Honorable Mention
Justin Greene	2011	Honorable Mention
Academic All-America
Dennis Odle	1974	Second Team

== Retired numbers ==
Kent State Golden Flashes retired numbers

Demetric Shaw; G, 1999–2002

Andrew Mitchell; G, 1998–2002

Trevor Huffman; G, 1998–2002

Eric Thomas; SG, 1998–2002

Antonio Gates; PF, 2001–2003

== Rivalries ==
Kent State vs. current Mid-American Conference teams through 2025–26
Team	Meetings	Wins–Losses	Percentage	Streak	First meeting
Akron	172	83–89	.483	L8	1916
Ball State	95	51–44	.537	W1	1922
Bowling Green	177	88–89	.497	W14	1917
Buffalo	63	41–22	.651	W7	1939
Central Michigan	93	56–37	.602	W1	1950
Eastern Michigan	89	53–36	.596	W4	1950
Massachusetts	3	3–0	1.000	W3	1960
Miami	158	61–97	.386	L5	1948
Northern Illinois	71	47–24	.662	W6	1964
Ohio	162	61–101	.377	W3	1931
Toledo	147	60–87	.408	W5	1934
Western Michigan	130	73–57	.562	W3	1951
Kent State vs. non-conference rivals
Cleveland State	59	36–23	.610	W10	1933
Youngstown State	47	31–16	.660	W9	1929

The principal rivalry for the Golden Flashes is with the Akron Zips from the University of Akron, located in Akron, Ohio, approximately 10 miles (16 km) southwest of Kent. The series dates back to February 19, 1916, when the two teams played in Kent in the basement of the old heating plant, won by Akron 37–16. Kent State recorded their first win in the series, a 23–21 win at Wills Gymnasium, in 1927. Through the 2025–26 season, the Zips lead the series 89–83. Akron's longest winning streak in the series is a nine-game streak from 1942 to 1949, while Kent State's longest winning streak is five games, which has occurred three times. Kent State had a 19-game home winning streak against the Zips, which spanned from 1964 to 1998. Despite the length of the rivalry and close proximity of the campuses, the series has only been a conference meeting since 1992 when Akron joined the Mid-American Conference. Prior to 1992, the rivalry was played in the Ohio Athletic Conference (OAC) for two periods, the first from 1932, when Kent State joined the conference, until 1936, when Akron left the OAC. The second period of conference play began in 1944 after Akron returned to the OAC, and ended when Kent State left the conference in 1951 to join the MAC. When the MAC created East and West divisions in 1998, both teams were placed in the East division. Since 2011, the games count as part of the larger Wagon Wheel Challenge between the two schools.

Since the start of MAC divisional play late 1990s, the two programs have met regularly with MAC East and overall championships on the line. Through the 2025–26 season, the Flashes and Zips have combined for 16 MAC East titles, 11 MAC regular-season championships, and 14 MAC tournament championships. The teams have often had their second meeting of the season as the regular season's final game, with several of those games featured in national broadcasts. Akron won the East division with a 66–64 overtime win at the MAC Center to end the regular season and claimed the MAC regular-season title in 2012 with a 61–55 win in Kent. The second meeting in 2010, played at James A. Rhodes Arena and broadcast nationally on ESPN, featured both teams atop the conference standings at 12–3. Kent State won the game 74–61 to clinch the MAC regular-season title. The following season, the Flashes clinched their second-consecutive MAC title with a 79–68 win over the Zips at the MAC Center in a nationally televised game on the regular season's final day, repeating the feat in 2015 with a 79–77 win over the Zips on ESPN2 to claim the regular-season and East division co-championship.

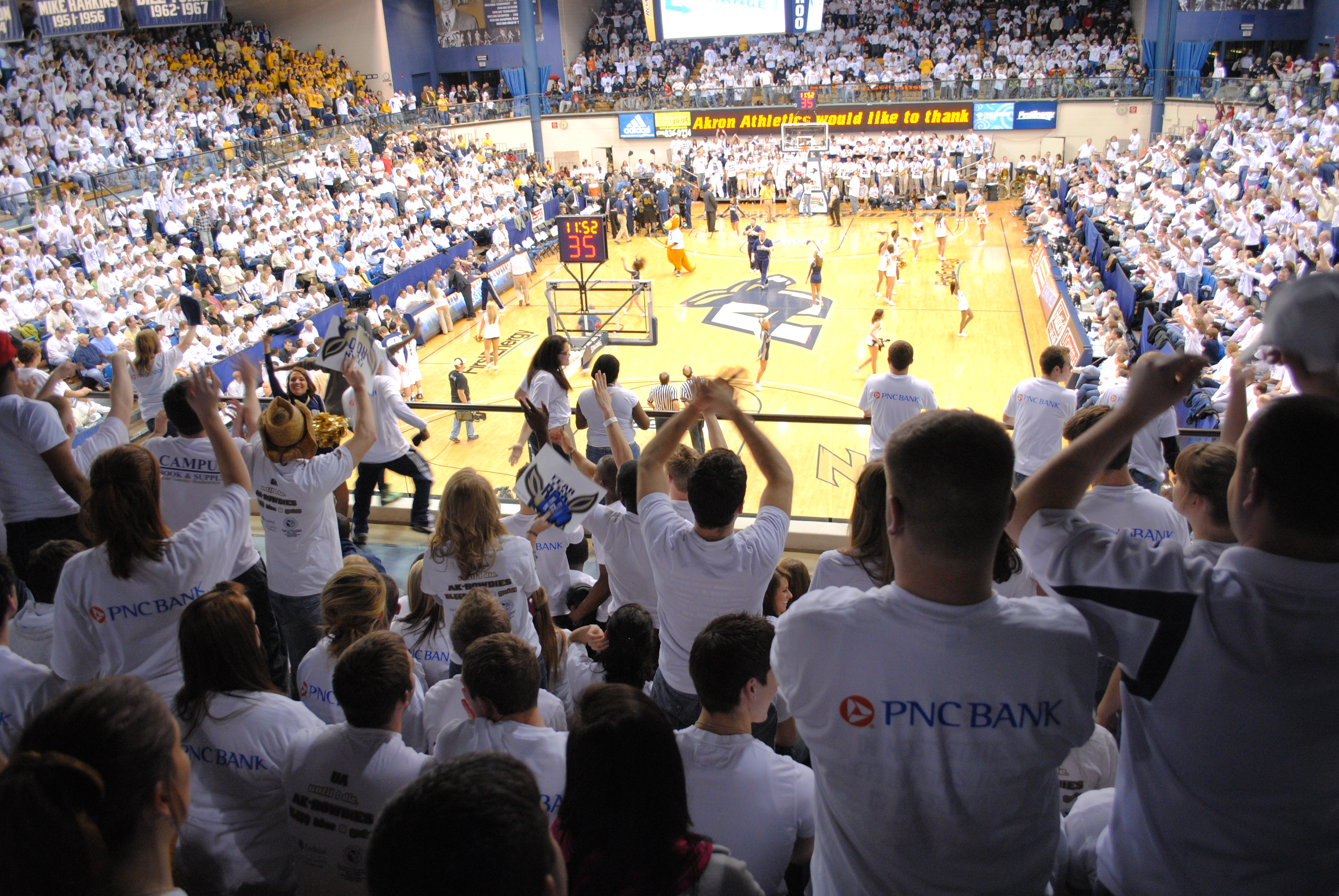
Kent State vs. Akron at James A. Rhodes Arena in 2010

In the MAC tournament, the Zips and Flashes have met 12 times through the 2026 tournament, including five times in the championship game. Akron holds a 8–4 edge in all tournament games, with Kent State picking up wins in 1998, 2008, 2017, and 2023, and Akron defeating the Flashes in 2007, 2011, 2012, 2013, 2015, 2022, 2024, and 2026. In the MAC championship game, played in Cleveland at the venue now known as Rocket Arena, the Zips have taken three of the five meetings. Kent State defeated the Zips 74–55 in the 2008 MAC Championship game, the Zips claimed the 2011 MAC tournament championship over Kent State with a 66–65 overtime win, Kent State won the 2017 MAC tournament championship over Akron, 70–65, and the Zips have won the past two title matchups, winning the 2022 MAC men's basketball tournament title 75-55 and the 2024 MAC men's basketball tournament title 62–61 over the Flashes.

Kent State also has local rivalries with the Cleveland State Vikings from Cleveland State University and the Youngstown State Penguins from Youngstown State University, both members of the Horizon League and located in Northeast Ohio near Kent. The series with Cleveland State began in 1933 when Cleveland State was Fenn College, though was discontinued after 1945. It resumed in 1971 and has been held regularly since then. Kent State leads the Vikings 36–23 after defeating the Vikings twice during the 2025–26 season. The series with Youngstown State began in 1929 and lasted through 1960. It resumed in 1998 and has been held regularly since then. The Flashes lead the series 31–16 following a 111–78 Kent State win at Rhodes Arena in Akron to open the 2017–18 season, the Flashes' ninth straight win in the series. Kent State, Cleveland State, Youngstown State, and Akron created the Northeast Ohio Coaches vs. Cancer doubleheader, a season opening event featuring the region's Division I basketball programs that rotated to each of the four schools over a four-year period. Kent State hosted the inaugural doubleheader in 2015, followed by Youngstown State in 2016 at the Beeghly Center, Akron in 2017 at James A. Rhodes Arena, and Cleveland State in 2018 at the Wolstein Center.
