= Stan Heath =

American basketball coach (born 1964)

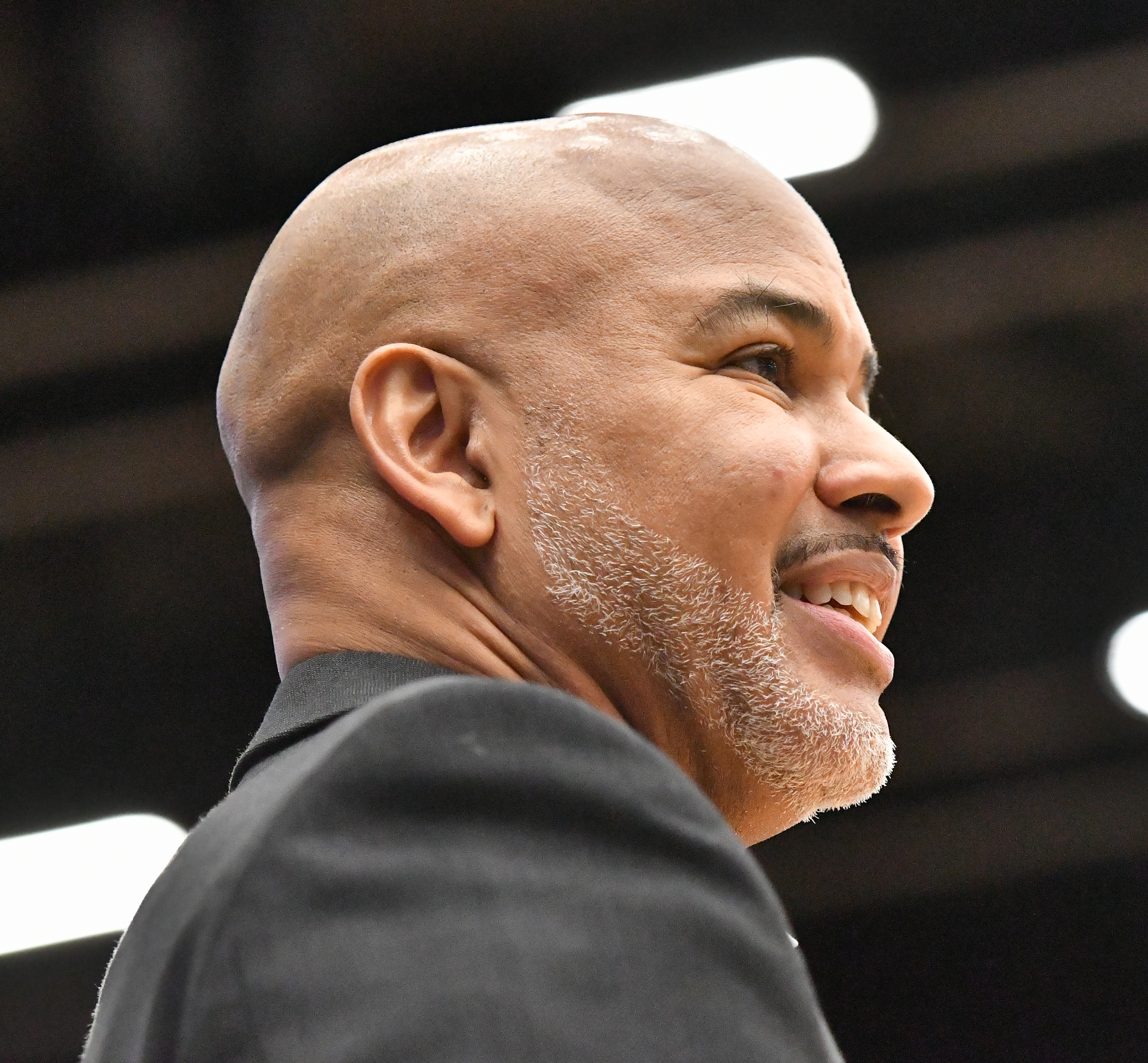
- Heath in 2020

Biographical details
- Born: December 17, 1964 (age 61); Detroit, Michigan, U.S.

Playing career
- 1984–1987: Eastern Michigan
- Position: Point guard

Coaching career (HC unless noted)
- 1988–1989: Hillsdale (assistant)
- 1989–1991: Albion (assistant)
- 1991–1994: Wayne State (MI) (assistant)
- 1994–1996: Bowling Green (assistant)
- 1996–2001: Michigan State (assistant)
- 2001–2002: Kent State
- 2002–2007: Arkansas
- 2007–2014: South Florida
- 2015–2017: Boston College (assistant)
- 2017–2021: Lakeland Magic
- 2021–2026: Eastern Michigan

Head coaching record
- Overall: 266–306 (.465) (NCAA); 94–63 (.599) (NBA G League)
- Tournaments: 5–4 (NCAA Division I); 0–1 (NIT)

Accomplishments and honors

Championships
- As head coach: NBA G League champion (2021); MAC tournament (2002); MAC regular season (2002); As assistant coach: NCAA champion (2000)

Awards
- G League Coach of the Year (2021); MAC Coach of the Year (2002); Big East Coach of the Year (2012)

Stanley Heath III (born December 17, 1964) is an American basketball coach who most recently served as the head coach for Eastern Michigan. Heath previously served as head coach at the University of South Florida, the University of Arkansas and Kent State University, the latter of whom he led to the Elite Eight of the 2002 NCAA basketball tournament. He led all three of these programs to at least one NCAA tournament.

== Background ==
Stan Heath graduated from Detroit Catholic Central High School in 1983. He was an all-state guard during his time there. He went on to earn his bachelor's in social science from Eastern Michigan University in 1988 and his master's in sports administration from Wayne State University in 1993. Heath redshirted during his first year at Eastern Michigan before lettering his final three years (1985–1987).

Heath is married to the former Ramona Webb (whom he met during his junior year at Eastern Michigan) and they have two sons, Jordan and Joshua.

== Coaching career ==
=== Assistant and Division II coaching ===
Stan Heath began his collegiate career at Hillsdale College in 1989 as an assistant. After one season, he moved to Albion College where he was an assistant and the junior varsity head coach for two years. He worked at Wayne State University in Detroit the following three years, including serving as associate head coach in 1994 when WSU set a school record for victories (25–5), helping the Tartars win two Great Lakes Intercollegiate Athletic Conference titles with a trip to the NCAA Division II Final Four in 1993.

After two seasons as an assistant at Bowling Green State University, he joined Tom Izzo at Michigan State University where he was an assistant for five years. He helped the Spartans advance to the Final Four three straight years (1999, 2000, 2001), win the 2000 national title, make another appearance in the Sweet 16 and go a combined 132–37. The Spartans posted records of 17–12 in 1997, 22–8 in 1998, 33–5 in 1999, 32–7 in 2000 and 28–5 in 2001. In addition to the three trips to the Final Four, MSU also reached the Sweet 16 in 1998 and the second round of the NIT in 1997.

On March 19, 2001, Sports Illustrated featured "five college coaches waiting in the wings." Heath was on that list, along with assistant Leonard Perry of Iowa State, Florida assistant John Pelphrey, head coach Jeff Ruland of Iona and Hofstra head coach Jay Wright. A month after that, he was named the head coach at Kent State.

=== Kent State ===
Heath got his first collegiate head coach job at Kent State in 2002. Under his guidance, the Golden Flashes finished with a 30–6 record that year and won the Mid-American Conference regular-season and tournament titles. They then came within a victory of reaching the Final Four before falling to Indiana at the South Regional finals of the NCAA tournament.

Along the way, Kent set school and MAC records for wins (30), breaking the record of 29 set by Ball State in 1989; became the first MAC team to reach the Elite Eight since Ohio University in 1964; recorded a league-record 21-game winning streak, including a 17–1 mark in conference play; beat three ranked teams in the NCAA Tournament, including No. 20 Oklahoma State, 69–61, No. 8 University of Alabama, 71–58, and No. 9 University of Pittsburgh, 78–73 in overtime; went 12–0 at home with an average attendance of 4,928, Kent's best since 1970; led the MAC in scoring defense (64.0 ppg), scoring margin (+11.9 ppg), field goal percentage defense (.418), rebounding margin (+5.0 rpg) and assist-to-turnover ratio (1.24) while also ranking second in three-point field goal percentage defense (.326) and turnover margin (+2.78); and suffered its five regular season losses by a total of 15 points.

Individually, Heath's 30 wins ties for the third-most by a first-year head coach in NCAA Division I history with John Warren of Oregon (1945). Only Bill Guthridge of North Carolina (34 in 1998) and Bill Hodges of Indiana State (33 in 1979) won more. The Detroit native was also voted the MAC Coach of the Year and named the national Rookie Coach of the Year by both CBSSportsline.com and CollegeInsider.com.

=== Arkansas ===
After his successful first season at Kent State, Heath then moved on to the head coaching position at the University of Arkansas. He was hired on March 28, 2002, to replace Nolan Richardson who had been fired that year after claiming he was being mistreated because he was African American and challenging athletic director Frank Broyles to buy out his contract.

The 2003 season (2002–2003), Heath's first as Razorback head coach, was a difficult one. With key players having left the team, as well as the normal adjustments to a new system, the team struggled to a 9–19 record.

The 2004 season (2003–2004) saw some improvement to key areas, as well as the addition of key freshmen Parade All-American Ronnie Brewer and McDonald's All-American Olu Famutimi, who contributed to a 12–16 record. The team was the 8th youngest in the NCAA.

The 2005 season (2004–2005) showed marked improvement in almost every area, most notably in the front court, with the addition of Steven Hill, Darian Townes, and Charles Thomas. The jewel of the recruiting class, Al Jefferson, never made it to Arkansas as he was selected in the NBA draft by the Boston Celtics. At the conclusion of the 2005 season, Heath spoke for the team in announcing they would not accept an invitation to the NIT end of year basketball tournament. This followed an end of year slide which resulted in the loss of 5 of the last 6 games. The team finished with an 18–12 overall record.

The 2006 season (2005–2006) began with a key win over University of Kansas, and respectable losses to national powers Connecticut and Maryland. The end of conference play brought on wins over ranked opponents Florida and Tennessee, five straight wins, and a winning regular season conference record for the first time for Heath at Arkansas. The Razorbacks received an NCAA tournament bid for the first time under Heath, but lost in the first round to Bucknell. At the end of the 2005–2006 season as coach, Arkansas had improved (winning percentage, post season play, conference record) in each of the four full seasons he has coached.

The 2007 season (2006–2007) began by winning the Old Spice Classic inaugural tournament with wins over Southern Illinois, Marist, and West Virginia. The team made it to the SEC Championship Game with victories over South Carolina, Mississippi State, and Vanderbilt. The Razorbacks would lose to Florida in the championship game 77–56 but still received an at large bid to the 2007 NCAA tournament for the second year in a row. The Razorbacks received a 12th seed but lost in the first round against 5th seeded Southern California with the final score of 77–60. On March 26, 2007, Heath's coaching career at Arkansas ended; he believed that lackluster ticket sales played a role. It was reported that Heath would get a settlement of $900,000 over the next three years after being fired. Heath had been earning $772,943 (including media contract, endorsements, etc.) plus an additional $71,000 tax deferred annuity and UA retirement account.

=== South Florida ===
Shortly after being fired from Arkansas, Heath agreed to a five-year contract with the South Florida Bulls on April 2, 2007, replacing Robert McCullum. The Bulls, coming off a 12–16 season the year before, lost their first 3 games of the season before rebounding with a win over in-state rival Florida State.

During the 2009–10 season, Heath led the Bulls to their first postseason tournament appearance since 2002. The team won 20 games (with a 9–9 Big East record) and earned a spot in the NIT but lost in the first round to North Carolina State.

Heath's most successful season came in his fifth year with the Bulls, when he led them to 22 victories, and tied for fourth in the Big East league standings. It was good enough to garner a 12 seed in the NCAA tournament, where USF defeated California in a play-in game and then knocked off fifth-seeded Temple in the round of 64 before losing to Ohio in the round of 32, 62–56.

Heath and the Bulls parted ways after the team lost in the first round of the 2014 conference tournament. He spent one season as a college basketball analyst for ESPN.

=== Back to assistant ranks ===
On June 30, 2015, Heath and Jim Christian were reunited as Boston College announced Heath would join Christian's coaching staff.

=== Lakeland Magic ===
In August 2017, Heath was announced as the new head coach of the NBA G League team the Lakeland Magic, the affiliate team of the NBA's Orlando Magic. In 2021, he led Lakeland to the G League championship in the pandemic-shortened single-site season. He was then named the league's Coach of the Year.

=== Eastern Michigan ===
On April 12, 2021, Heath was appointed as the new head coach of the Eastern Michigan's men's basketball team.

On March 8, 2026, Heath and Eastern Michigan mutually parted ways as his contract expired. He was 57–99 in five seasons at Eastern Michigan.

== Head coaching record ==
=== College ===
Record table
Season	Team	Overall	Conference	Standing	Postseason
Kent State Golden Flashes (Mid-American Conference) (2001–2002)
2001–02	Kent State	30–6	17–1	1st (East)	NCAA Division I Elite Eight
Kent State:		30–6 (.833)	17–1 (.944)		
Arkansas Razorbacks (Southeastern Conference) (2002–2007)
2002–03	Arkansas	9–19	4–12	T–5th (West)	
2003–04	Arkansas	12–16	4–12	6th (West)	
2004–05	Arkansas	18–12	6–10	4th (West)	
2005–06	Arkansas	22–10	10–6	T–2nd (West)	NCAA Division I First Round
2006–07	Arkansas	21–14	7–9	T–3rd (West)	NCAA Division I First Round
Arkansas:		82–71 (.536)	31–49 (.388)		
South Florida Bulls (Big East Conference) (2007–2013)
2007–08	South Florida	12–19	3–15	T–15th	
2008–09	South Florida	9–22	4–14	14th	
2009–10	South Florida	20–13	9–9	9th	NIT first round
2010–11	South Florida	10–23	3–15	15th	
2011–12	South Florida	22–14	12–6	T–4th	NCAA Division I Second Round
2012–13	South Florida	12–19	3–15	14th	
South Florida Bulls (American Athletic Conference) (2013–2014)
2013–14	South Florida	12–20	3–15	10th	
South Florida:		97–130 (.427)	37–89 (.294)		
Eastern Michigan Eagles (Mid-American Conference) (2021–2026)
2021–22	Eastern Michigan	10–21	5–15	11th	
2022–23	Eastern Michigan	8–23	5–13	T–9th	
2023–24	Eastern Michigan	13–18	6–12	10th	
2024–25	Eastern Michigan	16–16	9–9	T–6th	
2025–26	Eastern Michigan	10–21	4–14	T–11th	
Eastern Michigan:		57–99 (.365)	29–63 (.315)		
Total:		266–306 (.465)			
National champion Postseason invitational champion Conference regular season champion Conference regular season and conference tournament champion Division regular season champion Division regular season and conference tournament champion Conference tournament champion
