= List of Cleveland State University College of Law alumni =

This is a list of notable alumni of Cleveland State University College of Law in Cleveland, Ohio. This list includes graduates of Cleveland Law School and John Marshall School of Law, which merged in 1946 to form Cleveland–Marshall, which was renamed the CSU College of Law in 2022.

== List ==
CSU Law alumni

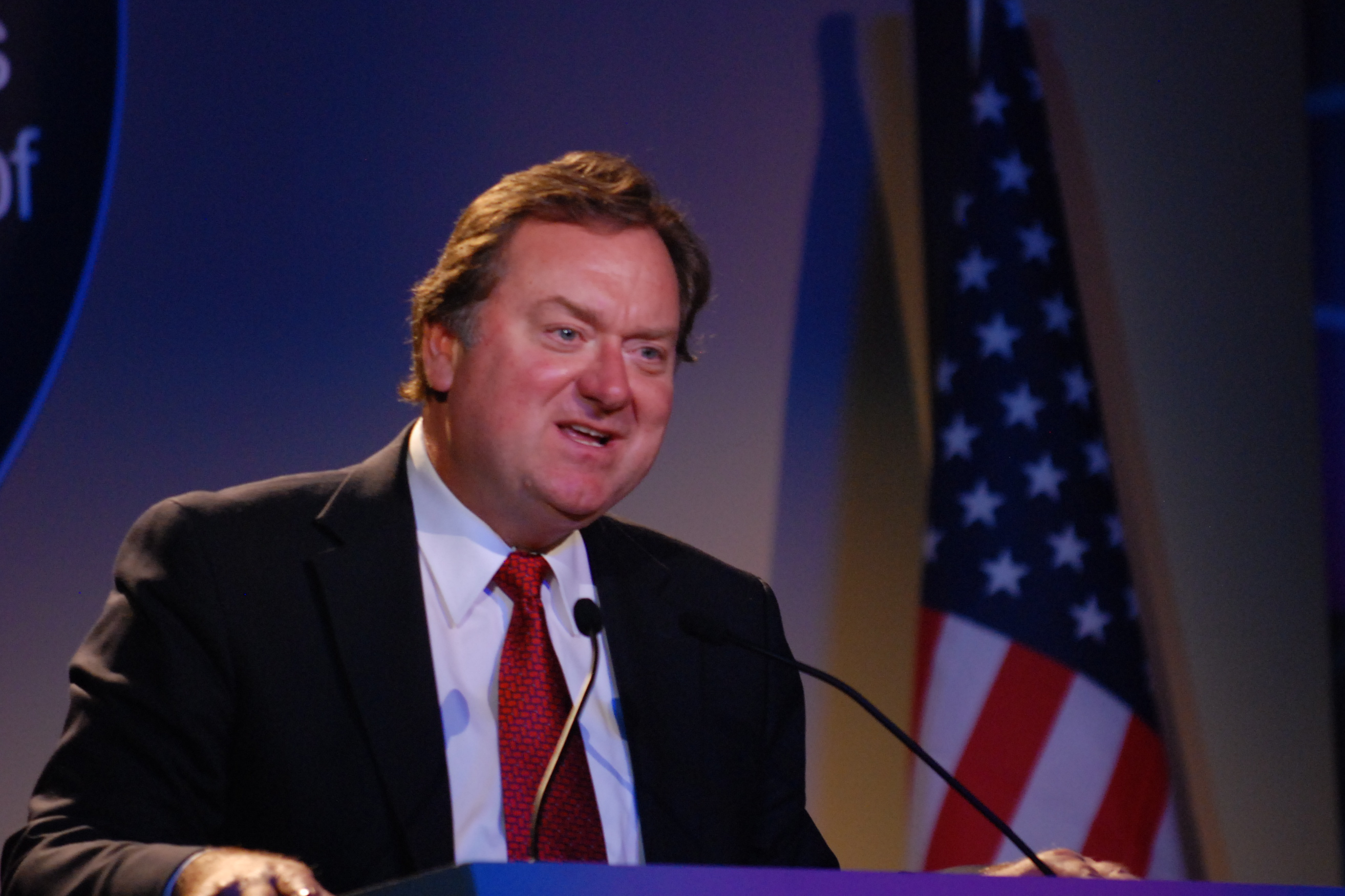
Tim Russert of Meet the Press

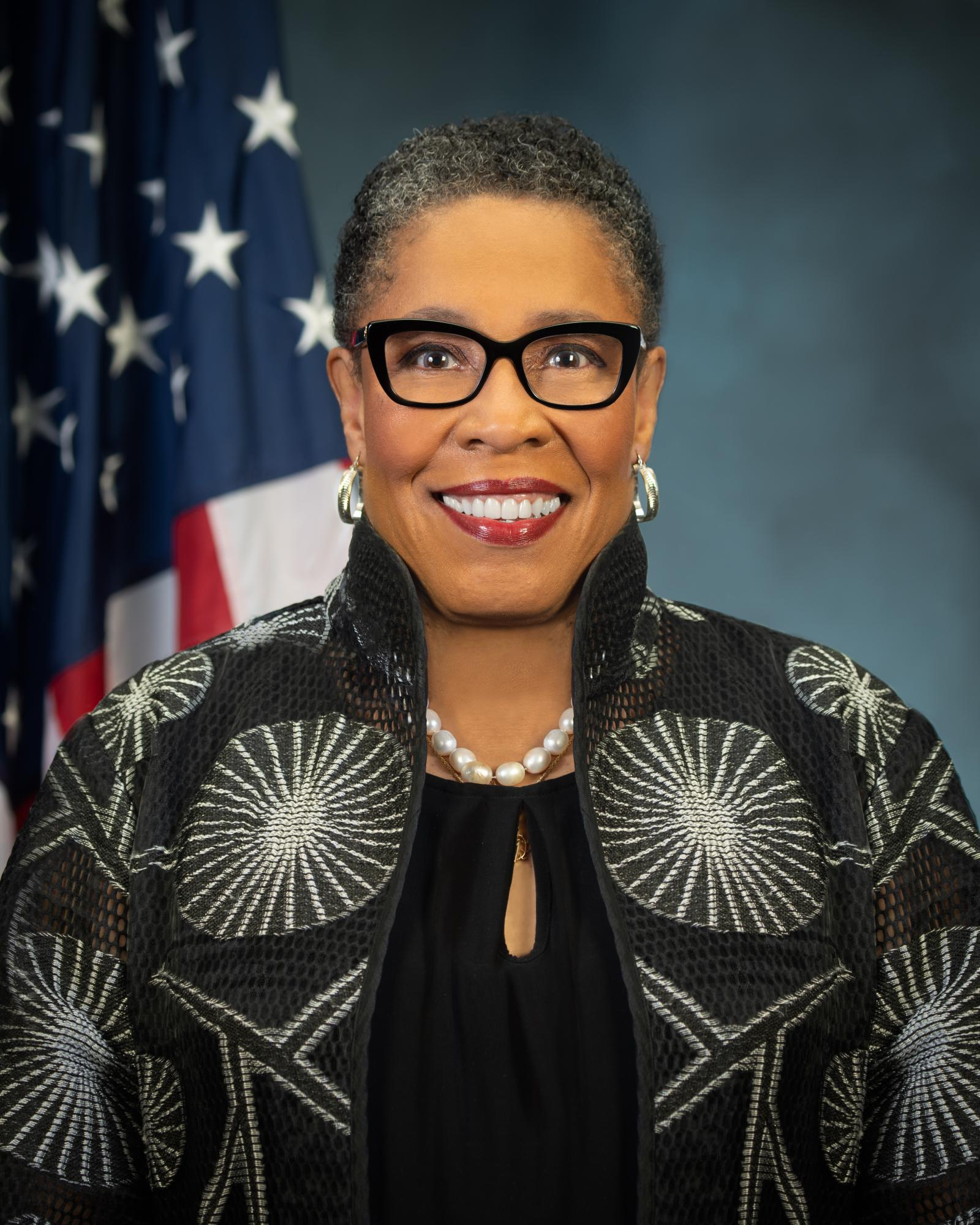
Secretary of Housing and Urban Development Marcia Fudge

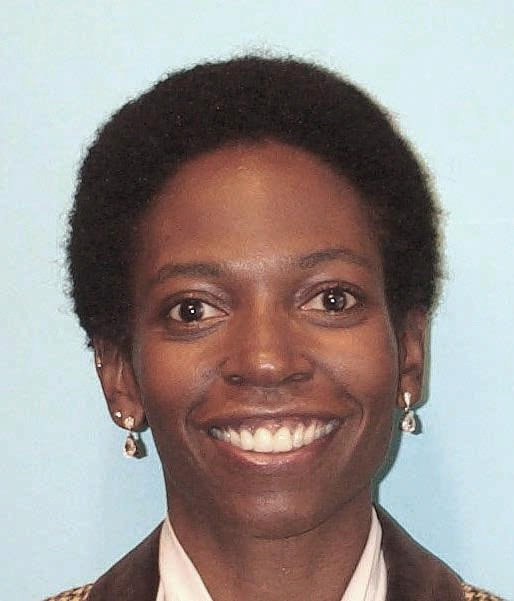
Federal Judge Benita Y. Pearson (appointed by Barack Obama)

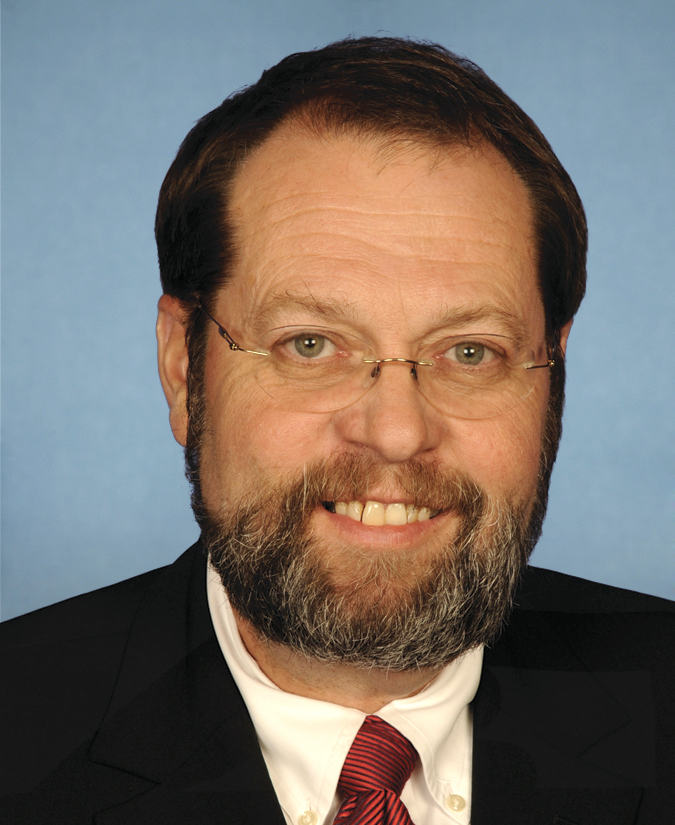
U.S. Representative Steven C. LaTourette

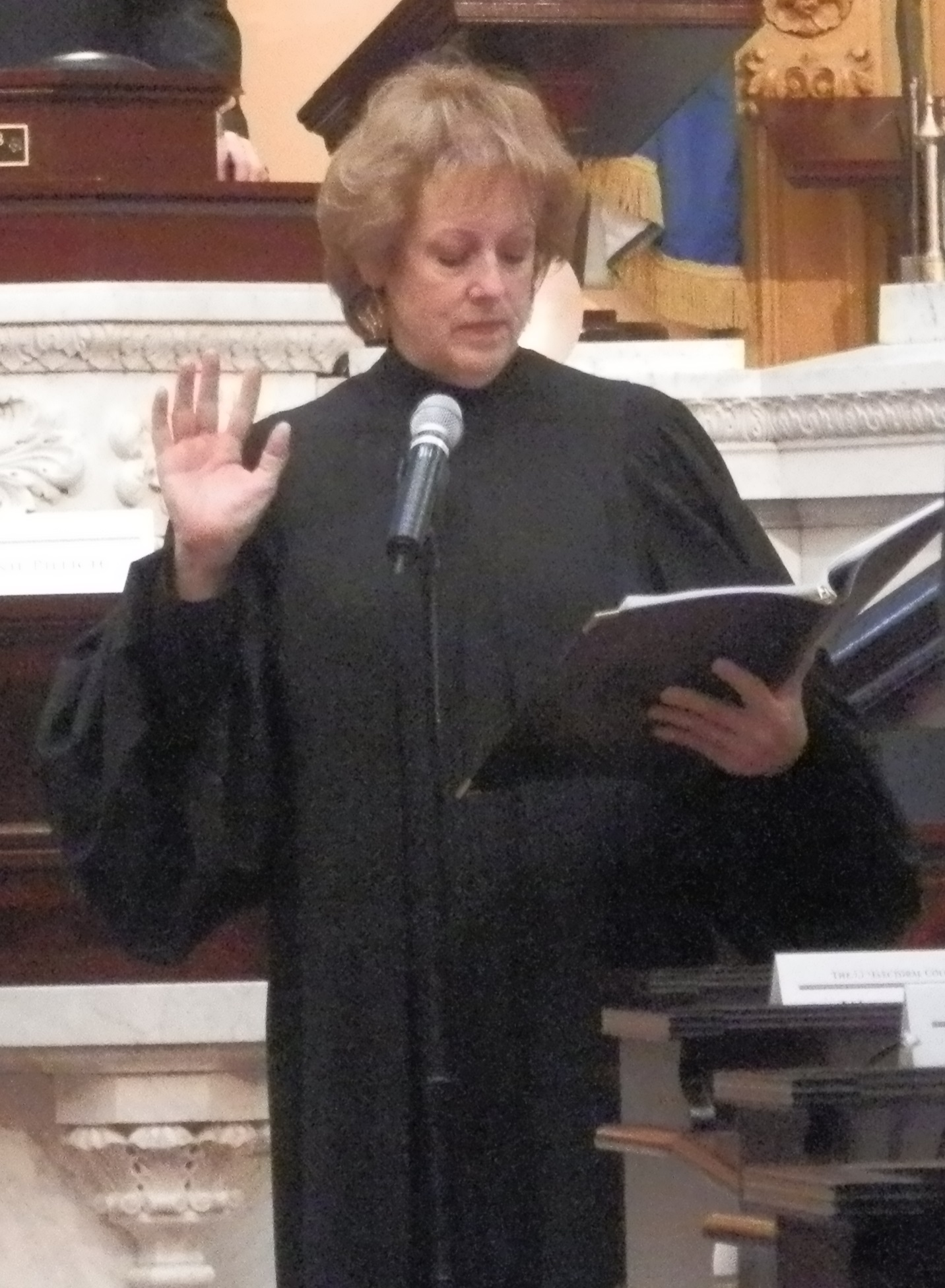
Maureen O'Connor, chief justice of the Supreme Court of Ohio

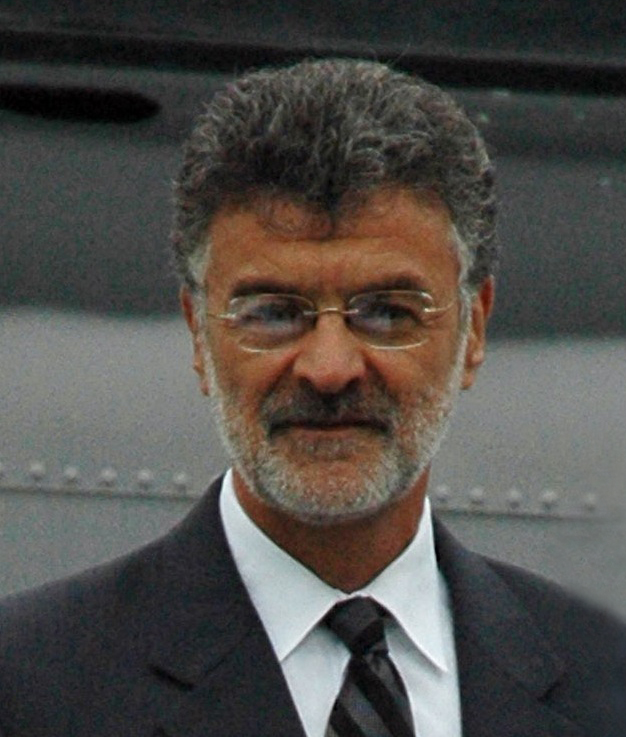
Cleveland Mayor Frank G. Jackson

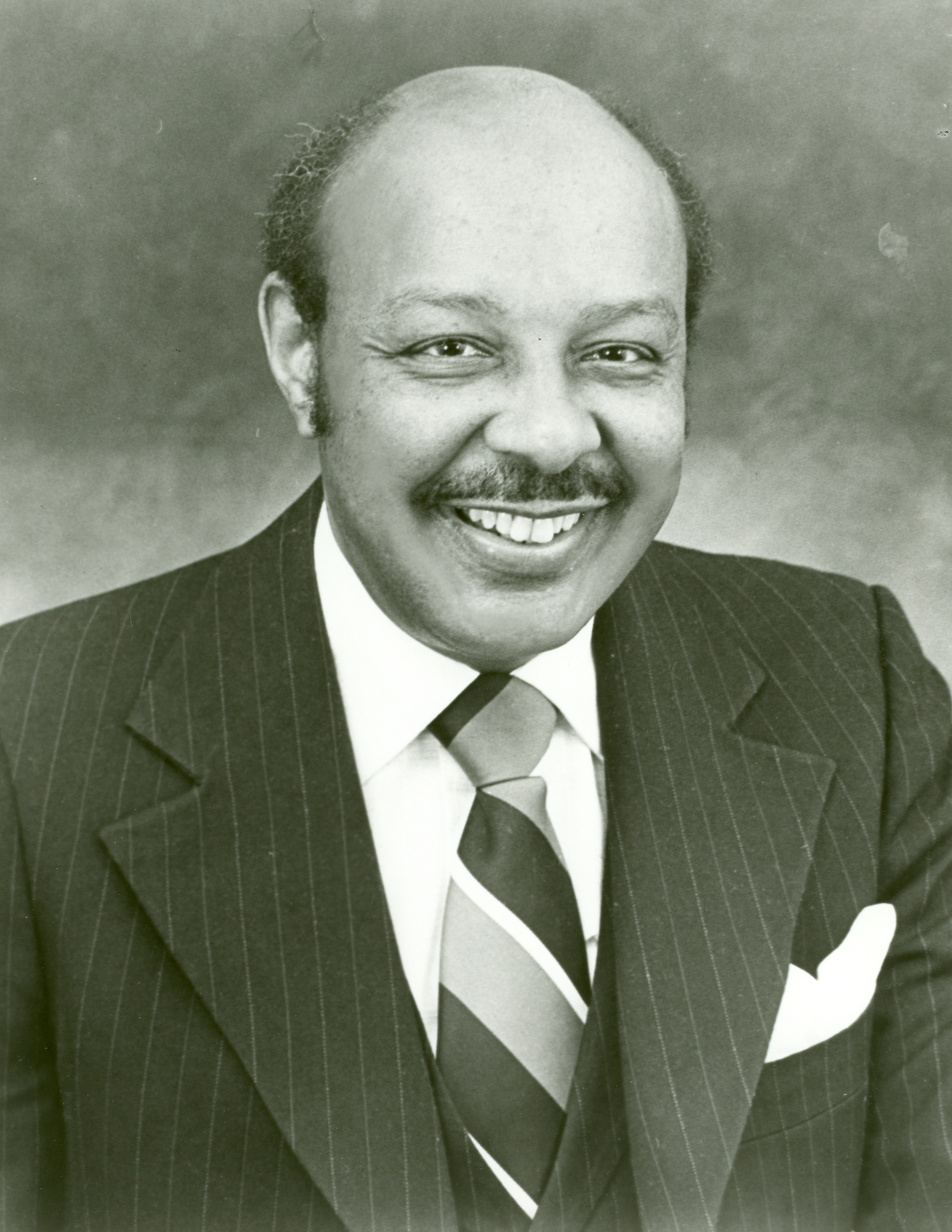
Louis Stokes, U.S. congressman

Name	Class year	Notability	Reference(s)
Richard J. Ambrose	1987	Cuyahoga County Court of Common Pleas judge; former Cleveland Browns football player	
John J. Babka	1908 (Cleveland Law School)	U.S. representative from Ohio	
Matt Barrett		Ohio state representative	
Jim Betts		former member of the Ohio House of Representatives	
Edward J. Blythin	graduated Cleveland Law School	mayor of Cleveland, previously its law director; candidate for U.S. Senate	
Elizabeth M. Boyer		lawyer, writer/publisher, and feminist founder of WEAL	
Christopher A. Boyko	1979	United States federal judge	
Eric Brown	1979	former chief justice of the Ohio Supreme Court	
Anthony O. Calabrese Jr.	1961	Ohio Court of Appeals judge and Cuyahoga County Common Pleas judge	
Jamie Callender		attorney, college professor, former member of the Ohio General Assembly	
James H. Cassidy	graduated Cleveland Law School	U.S. representative from Ohio	
Anthony J. Celebrezze, Jr.	1974	Ohio state senator, Ohio secretary of state and Ohio attorney general; candidate for Ohio governor	
Frank D. Celebrezze Jr.	1983	Ohio Court of Appeals judge and Cuyahoga County Common Pleas judge	
Angelin Chang		Grammy Award-winning classical pianist and attorney	
Genevieve R. Cline	1921 (Cleveland Law School)	first woman to serve as a United States federal judge	
Bill Coley		member of the Ohio Senate and Ohio House of Representatives	
James C. Connell	1918 (John Marshall School of Law)	United States federal judge	
Arthur H. Day	1916 (Cleveland Law School)	Ohio state senator and served a six-year term as a justice of the Ohio Supreme Court.	
Mary DeGenaro	1986	associate justice of the Supreme Court of Ohio	
Kathleen Donovan		Bergen County, New Jersey executive; former Bergen County clerk; represented New Jersey's 36th Legislative District in the New Jersey State Assembly; former chairwoman of the New Jersey Republican State Committee; former commissioner and first chairwoman of the Port Authority of New York and New Jersey	
Dennis E. Eckart		Democratic Congressman	
Ed Feighan	1978	member of the Ohio House of Representatives; U.S. representative 1983–993 of Ohio's 19th congressional district	
Ed FitzGerald	1993	first county executive of Cuyahoga County, Ohio; mayor of Lakewood, Ohio; Democratic candidate for governor of Ohio in 2014	
George L. Forbes	1961	Cleveland City Council president, Cleveland NAACP president	
Alan Fried		NCAA champion wrestler and 4-time Junior National Freestyle Champion, and author	
Marcia L. Fudge	1983	18th and current United States Secretary of Housing and Urban Development, former Democratic congresswoman for Ohio's 11th congressional district in the United States House of Representatives	
Paul Hackett	1980	lawyer, politician, veteran of the Iraq War	
Jane Edna Hunter	1925 (Cleveland Law School)	founder of the Phyllis Wheatley Center for the poor in Cleveland, Ohio	
Frank G. Jackson		mayor of Cleveland, former city council president	
Peter Kirsanow	1979	attorney, writer and member of the U.S. Commission on Civil Rights	
Thomas Demetrios Lambros	1952	former United States federal judge	
Steven C. LaTourette	1980	U.S. representative from Ohio 1995–2013	
Frank J. Lausche	graduated John Marshall Law School	U.S. senator, Ohio governor, mayor of Cleveland	
Nancy Lerner		philanthropist	
John M. Manos		former judge of the United States District Court for the Northern District of Ohio	
William D. Mason	1986	prosecutor of Cuyahoga County, Ohio	
Charles Joseph McNamee	1917 (Cleveland Law School)	United States federal judge	
Robert M. Murray	graduated Cleveland Law School	attorney, banker, businessman and Democratic congressman	
Donald C. Nugent		United States District Court for the Northern District of Ohio	
Maureen O'Connor	1980	chief justice of the Ohio Supreme Court	
Terrence O'Donnell	1971	Ohio Supreme Court justice	
William O'Neill	1980	justice on the Supreme Court of Ohio	
Benita Y. Pearson	1995	district judge for the United States District Court for the Northern District of Ohio; former federal magistrate judge	
Tim Russert	1976	journalist, writer and longtime television broadcaster	
Michael J. Skindell	1987	Ohio state senator, former member of Ohio House of Representatives	
Carl B. Stokes		first African-American mayor of a major U.S. city (Cleveland)	
Louis Stokes	1953	15-term Democratic Congressman	
Francis E. Sweeney Sr.	1963	Ohio Supreme Court justice	
Martin L. Sweeney	1914 (Cleveland Law School)	U.S. representative from Ohio (father of Robert E. Sweeney)	
Robert E. Sweeney		U.S. representative from Ohio (son of Martin L. Sweeney)	
Stanley Tolliver	1951 (John Marshall School of Law)	attorney, school board president, civil rights activist, and radio talk show host	
Lesley B. Wells		former United States District Court judge	
Uncas A. Whitaker	graduated Cleveland Law School	engineer, lawyer, entrepreneur and philanthropist	
George Washington White	1955	former United States federal judge	
Bert Wolstein	1953	real estate developer; owner of indoor soccer franchise	
