= List of first minority male lawyers and judges in Ohio =

This is a list of the first minority male lawyer(s) and judge(s) in Ohio. It includes the year in which the men were admitted to practice law (in parentheses). Also included are men who achieved other distinctions such becoming the first in their state to graduate from law school or become a political figure.

== Firsts in Ohio's history ==
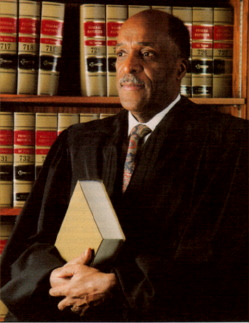
Nathaniel R. Jones: First African American male to serve as an Assistant U.S. Attorney for the Northern District of Ohio (1962)

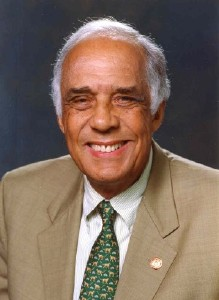
Robert Morton Duncan: First African American male Justice of the Ohio Supreme Court (1969)

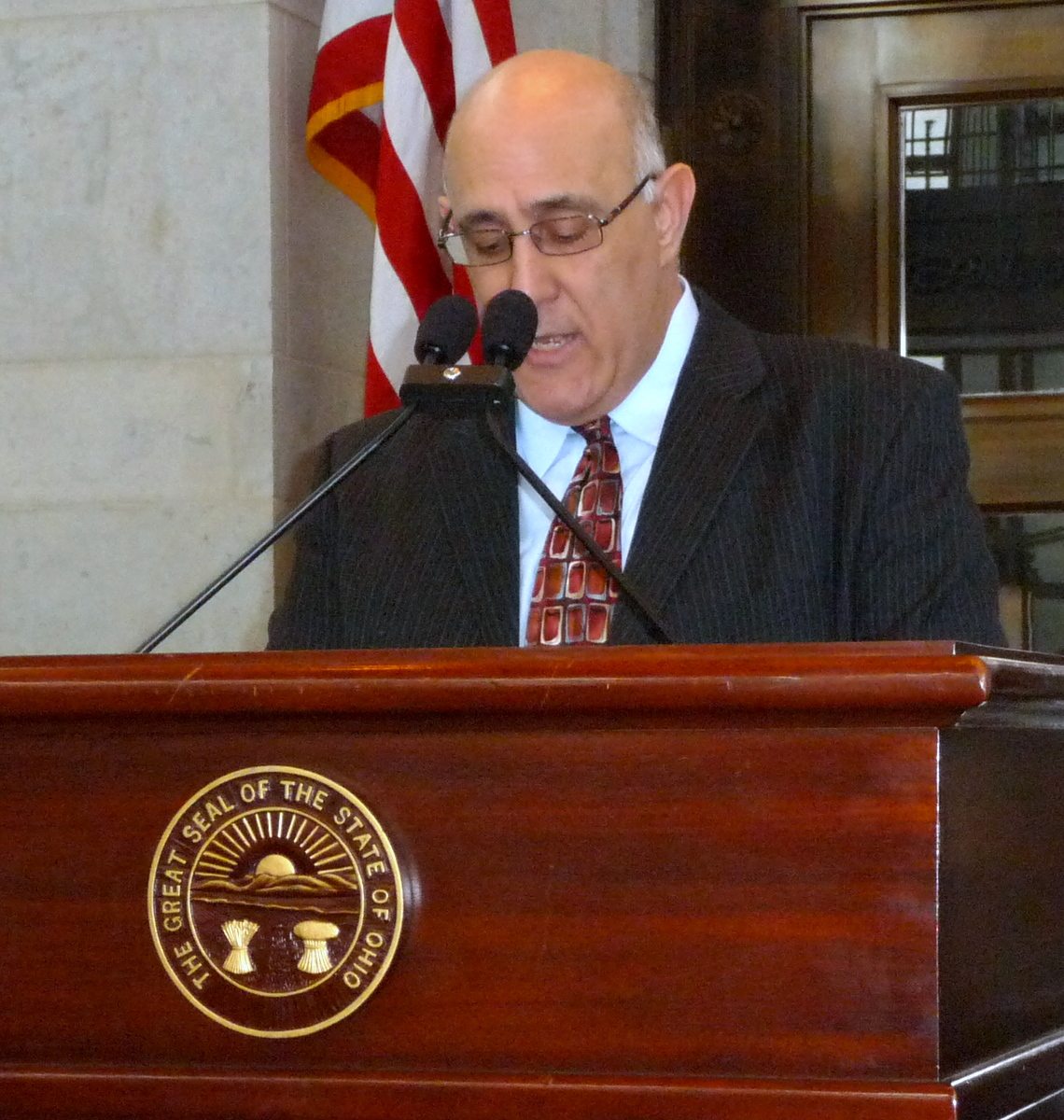
Eric Brown: First Jewish American male Chief Justice of the Ohio Supreme Court (2010)

=== Lawyers ===
- First Native American male: James McDonald (1823)
- First African American male: John Mercer Langston (1854)
- First African American male admitted to practice by the Supreme Court of Ohio: James (J.H.) Guy in 1885
- First African American male (appointed special counsel for the Attorney General of Ohio): L.H. Godman in 1911
- First Hispanic American male: Vincent S. Gonzales (1974)
- First Somali-born male: Ismail Mohamad (2017)

=== State judges ===
- First African American: Perry B. Jackson (1922) in 1942
- First Jewish American male (Supreme Court of Ohio): Gilbert Bettman (c. 1942)
- First African American male (common pleas): Charles W. White in 1955
- First African American male elected (common pleas): Robert V. Franklin Jr. in 1968
- First African American male (Ohio Supreme Court): Robert Morton Duncan (1952) in 1969
- First Latino American male (reputed): Joseph Flores (1964) in 1981
- First Jewish American male (Chief Justice; Ohio Supreme Court): Eric Brown (1979) from 2010 to 2011

=== Federal judges ===
- First African American male (U.S. Court of Military Appeals; U.S. District Court for the Southern District of Ohio): Robert Morton Duncan (1952) in 1971 and 1974 respectively
- First Greek American male (United States District Court for the Northern District of Ohio): Thomas Demetrios Lambros in 1967
- First African American male (U.S. District Court for the Northern District of Ohio): George Washington White (1955) in 1980
- First African American male (Judge and Chief Judge: U.S. Bankruptcy Court for the Northern District of Ohio): Randolph Baxter in 1985 and 2004
- First Greek American male (Chief Judge; United States District Court for the Northern District of Ohio): Thomas Demetrios Lambros in 1990
- First African American male (Chief Judge; U.S. District Court for the Northern District of Ohio): George Washington White (1955) in 1995
- First African American male (Chief Judge; U.S. District Court for the Southern District of Ohio): Algenon L. Marbley in 2019

=== Attorney General of Ohio ===
- First Jewish American male: Gilbert Bettman in 1928

=== Assistant U.S. Attorney ===
- First African American male (Northern District of Ohio): Nathaniel R. Jones (1957) in 1962
- First African American male (Southern District of Ohio): E. Winther McCroom in 1964

=== Ohio State Bar Association ===
- First Jewish American male president: Simeon M. Johnson in 1912
- First African American male president: John A. Howard from 1981 to 1982

== Firsts in local history ==
- Athornia Steele: First African American male to serve as the Dean of Capital University Law School (2003) [Delaware, Fairfield, and Franklin Counties, Ohio]
- Andrew Jackson Davison: First African American male lawyer in Athens County, Ohio
- Vincent Zottarelli and Benjamin D. Nicola: First Italian American male lawyers in Cleveland, Ohio [Cuyahoga County, Ohio]
- Frank D. Celebrezze: First Italian American male judge in Cleveland, Ohio (1937) [Cuyahoga County, Ohio]
- Pablo Castro: First Hispanic American male magistrate of the Cleveland Municipal Court (2007)
- John Francis: First African American male to serve as the City Attorney for Columbus, Ohio (c. 1977)
- Robert Morton Duncan (1952): First African American male elected to serve in a judicial office in Franklin County, Ohio
- William L. Mallory (1986): First African American male to serve as a Judge of the Hamilton County First District Court of Appeals of Ohio
- Ponce de Leon: First Latino American lawyer on the Lake County Public Defender’s staff (c. 1997)
- John A. Howard: First African American male elected as a judge in Lorain County (Elyria Municipal Court 1984 to 1999) after serving as the first African American President of the Ohio State Bar Association (1981–1982).
- Gustalo Nunez: First Hispanic American male judge in Lorain County, Ohio
- Robert V. Franklin Jr.: First African American male to serve as a Judge of the Toledo Municipal Court (1960) and later the Lucas County Common Pleas Court (1968)
- Charlie Hider: First Arab American male lawyer in Toledo, Lucas County, Ohio
- Robert A. Pinn (1879): First African American lawyer in Massillon County, Ohio and Stark County, Ohio
- Moses H. Jones: First African American male lawyer in Dayton, Montgomery County, Ohio
- Russell L. Carter: First African American male judge in Dayton, Montgomery County, Ohio (1996)
- Arthur Fisher: First African American male elected as a Judge of the Common Pleas Court (Domestic Relations) in Montgomery County, Ohio
- Gerald Parker: First African American male to serve as a Judge of the Montgomery County Common Pleas Court General Division, Ohio
- Jeff Payton: First African American male judge in Richland County, Ohio
- Robert A. Pinn (1879): First African American lawyer in Massillon County, Ohio and Stark County, Ohio
- Clay E. Hunter: First African American male judge in Stark County, Ohio (upon his appointment to the Canton Municipal Court in 1962)
- Kyle L. Stone (2021): First African-American elected prosecutor in Stark County, Ohio
- Joseph D. Roulhac: First African American male judge in Akron, Ohio (Summit County, Ohio; 1967). He was also the first African American Assistant Summit County Prosecutor.
- Isaac C. Hunt, Jr: First African American male to serve as the Dean of University of Akron School of Law (1987)

== See also ==
- List of first minority male lawyers and judges in the United States

== Other topics of interest ==
- List of first women lawyers and judges in the United States
- List of first women lawyers and judges in Ohio
