= Chuck Smith (baseball) =

American baseball player (born 1969)

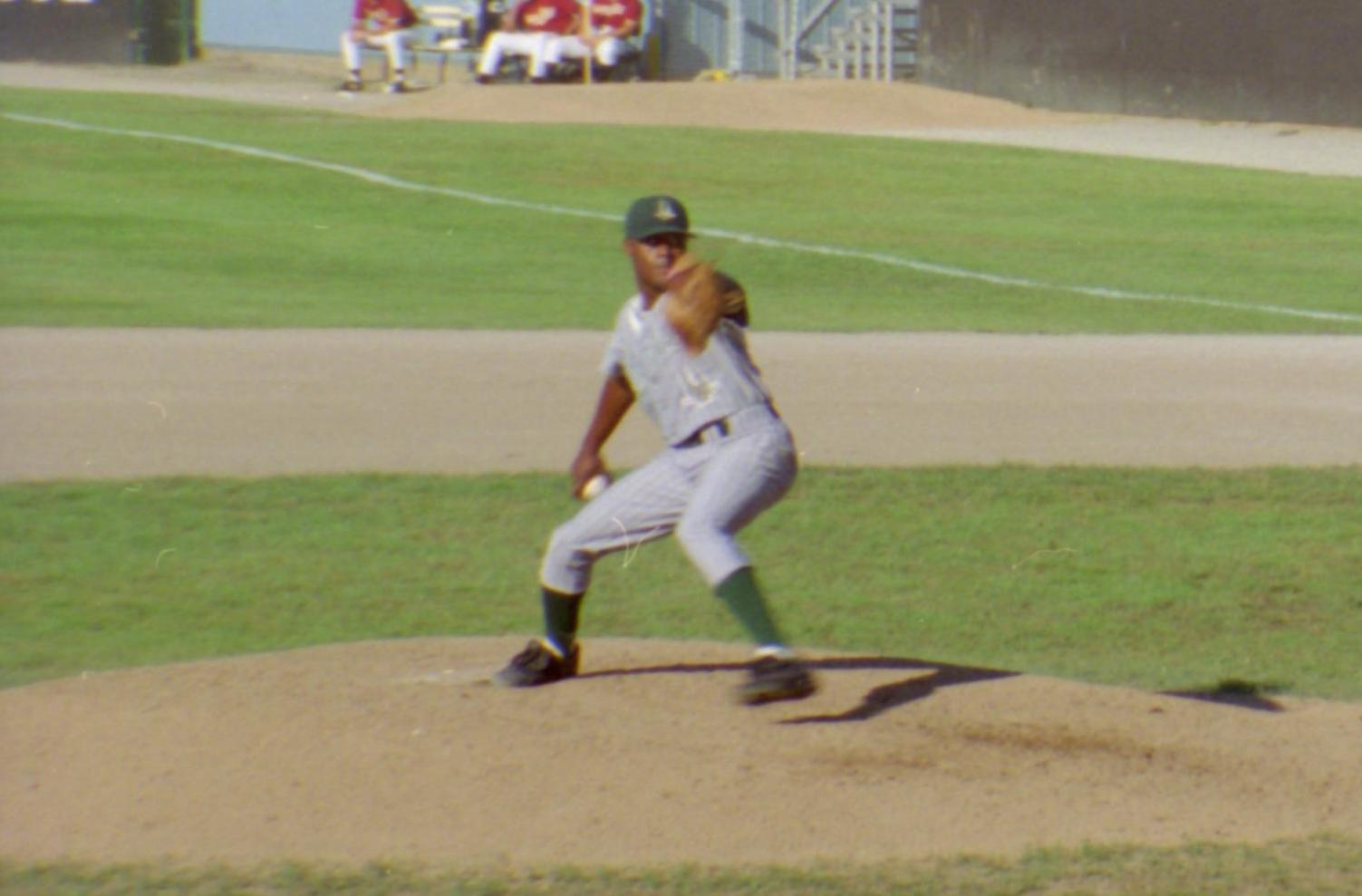
- Smith with the South Bend Silver Hawks in 1995
- Pitcher
- Born: October 21, 1968 (age 57); Memphis, Tennessee, U.S.
- Batted: Right Threw: Right

MLB debut
- June 13, 2000, for the Florida Marlins

Last MLB appearance
- July 24, 2001, for the Florida Marlins

CPBL statistics
- Win–loss record: 2–7
- Earned run average: 3.31
- Strikeouts: 40

MLB statistics
- Win–loss record: 11–11
- Earned run average: 3.84
- Strikeouts: 189

KBO statistics
- Win–loss record: 4–6
- Earned run average: 4.55
- Strikeouts: 45
- Stats at Baseball Reference

Teams
- Uni-President Lions (1998); Florida Marlins (2000–2001); Doosan Bears (2005); Brother Elephants (2006)

Charles Edward Smith (born October 21, 1968) is an American former Major League Baseball player and a former mayor of Woodmere, Ohio.

In 2022, Smith pled guilty to two federal charges related to using stolen debit and credit card information.

== Early life ==
He attended John Adams High School in Cleveland, Ohio and later Indiana State University. He was listed at 6 ft 1 in, 185 pounds during his playing days. Growing up, his idol was Satchel Paige.

== Playing career ==
He was originally drafted in the 30th round (772nd overall) in the 1989 draft by the Montreal Expos. He did not sign, but in 1991, the Houston Astros picked him up as an undrafted free agent.

Smith spent time in all levels of pro ball, including independent baseball and international baseball, as both a starter and reliever. He was a replacement player in spring training in 1995 during the MLB strike, and then had perhaps his best minor league season in 1995 with the South Bend Silver Hawks, going 10–10 with a 2.67 earned run average and 145 strikeouts in 167 innings pitched.

After years in the minors, he finally reached the major leagues at the age of 30 in 2000 with the Florida Marlins (to whom he'd been traded for Brant Brown). He had a successful major league debut on June 30: in six innings of work, he gave up six hits, struck out six and only allowed one earned run-a home run by Ron Gant in the first inning, which was also the first hit he allowed. He earned no decision in the game. He won his first game on July 27 of that year against the Atlanta Braves: in five innings of work, he walked four, struck out two, and gave up six hits but still managed a win. He completed his first game on September 23 against the Colorado Rockies-albeit a shortened, 7-inning game. He finished his rookie season with a 6–6 record and a 3.23 ERA. Smith received one vote in National League Rookie of the Year voting, tied with future league leaders Lance Berkman and Juan Pierre.

Described as being "...on top of his game when he moves his pitches around...with his incredible control", Smith "...smokes his fastball past hitters up high and induces pathetic ground balls with his low off-speed stuff." He apparently lost some of that skill in 2001, as he went 5–5 with an ERA that jumped to 4.70 while he also gave up the 16th home run in Barry Bonds' record breaking 2001 season, when Bonds hit 73 homers. Smith played his final major league game on July 24, 2001.

In 2004, Smith pitched for the Richmond Braves and was tied with Alex Graman in leading the International League in strikeouts with 129.

Smith pitched for the Brother Elephants in the Chinese Professional Baseball League in 2006.

== Career stats ==
Smith went 11–11 with a 3.84 ERA in his major league career in 34 games started. He struck out 189 batters in 210+ innings. He gave up just 16 home runs in his career. He had a .136 average as a batter. He walked once and struck out 27 times in 66 at bats. As a fielder, he made three errors for a .935 fielding percentage.

After his time with the Marlins, he jumped around the minor leagues in the Rockies, Mets, Braves and Orioles farm systems. He finished his minor league career with an 89–76 record, and an ERA of 3.89.

== Post-playing career ==
In February 2008, Smith was named pitching coach of the Lancaster JetHawks, a minor league affiliate of the Boston Red Sox.

In November 2009, Smith was elected mayor of Woodmere, Ohio, a position he held for two terms.

On May 19, 2022, Smith pleaded guilty in the United States District Court for the Northern District of Ohio to one count each of access device fraud and aggravated identity theft, stemming from his purchasing stolen debit card and credit card information on the dark web and using it to put gas in the truck which he used to deliver packages for Amazon. Senior Judge Christopher A. Boyko sentenced him to 33 months in prison on August 25, 2022.
