= Benita Y. Pearson =

American judge (born 1963)

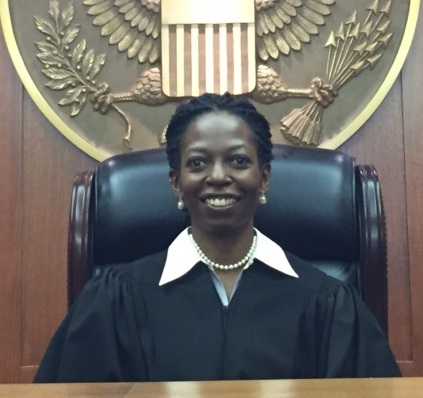

Judge of the United States District Court for the Northern District of Ohio
- Incumbent
- Assumed office December 27, 2010
- Appointed by: Barack Obama
- Preceded by: Peter C. Economus

Magistrate Judge of the United States District Court for the Northern District of Ohio
- In office August 2008 – December 27, 2010

Personal details
- Born: February 1963 (age 63) Cleveland, Ohio, U.S.
- Education: Georgetown University (BS); Cleveland State University (JD)

Benita Yalonda Pearson (born February 1963) is a United States district judge of the United States District Court for the Northern District of Ohio and formerly a United States magistrate judge on the same court.

== Early life and education ==
Born and raised in Cleveland, Pearson earned a Bachelor of Science degree in accounting from Georgetown University in 1985 and then earned a Juris Doctor from the Cleveland State University College of Law in 1995.

== Career ==
From 1985 to 1992, Pearson worked for BP, first as a corporate accountant from 1985 to 1987 and then as a supervisor of retail marketing accounting from 1987 to 1990 and then in retail sales from 1990 to 1992. From 1992 to 1994, Pearson worked as a law clerk for a Cleveland law firm, and from 1995 to 1996, Pearson served as a litigation associate for a Cleveland law firm. From 1996 to 1998, Pearson served as a law clerk for Judge John Michael Manos of the United States District Court for the Northern District of Ohio. From 1998 until 2000, Pearson served as a general litigation associate for Jones Day Reavis & Pogue in Cleveland. From 2000 to 2008, Pearson served as an assistant United States attorney in Cleveland.

=== Federal judicial service ===
In August 2008, Pearson became a United States magistrate judge of the United States District Court for the Northern District of Ohio.

In July 2009, Pearson was recommended to serve as a United States district judge of the United States District Court for the Northern District of Ohio by both Ohio Senators, Democrat Sherrod Brown and Republican George Voinovich. On December 3, 2009, President Barack Obama formally nominated Pearson to serve on the Northern District of Ohio. Pearson was chosen to fill the seat vacated by Judge Peter C. Economus, who assumed senior status on July 3, 2009. The United States Senate Committee on the Judiciary reported Pearson's nomination to the Senate on February 11, 2010. On December 21, 2010, her nomination was confirmed by the Senate by a 56–39 vote, with George Voinovich of Ohio casting the lone Republican affirmative vote. She received her commission on December 27, 2010. She became the first African-American woman to hold a federal judgeship in Ohio.

== See also ==
- List of African-American federal judges
- List of African-American jurists
- List of Cleveland State University College of Law alumni
- List of first women lawyers and judges in Ohio

Legal offices
Preceded by Peter C. Economus	Judge of the United States District Court for the Northern District of Ohio; 2010–present	Incumbent
