= Girard Edward Kalbfleisch =

American judge (1899–1990)

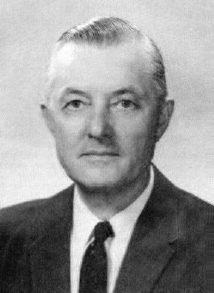

Senior Judge of the United States District Court for the Northern District of Ohio
- In office September 30, 1970 – April 1, 1990

Chief Judge of the United States District Court for the Northern District of Ohio
- In office 1967–1969
- Preceded by: James C. Connell
- Succeeded by: Frank J. Battisti

Judge of the United States District Court for the Northern District of Ohio
- In office September 21, 1959 – September 30, 1970
- Appointed by: Dwight D. Eisenhower
- Preceded by: Paul Charles Weick
- Succeeded by: Nicholas Joseph Walinski Jr.

Personal details
- Born: Girard Edward Kalbfleisch; August 3, 1899 Piqua, Ohio, U.S.
- Died: April 1, 1990 (aged 90)
- Education: Claude W. Pettit College of Law (LL.B.)

Girard Edward Kalbfleisch (August 3, 1899 – April 1, 1990) was a United States district judge of the United States District Court for the Northern District of Ohio.

== Education and career ==
Born in Piqua, Ohio, Kalbfleisch received a Bachelor of Laws from the Warren G. Harding College of Law (now the Claude W. Pettit College of Law) at Ohio Northern University in 1923 where he was a member of Sigma Pi fraternity. He was in private practice in Mansfield, Ohio from 1924 to 1929. He was prosecuting attorney of Richland County, Ohio from 1929 to 1933. He was in private practice in Mansfield from 1933 to 1936. He was a municipal judge for Mansfield from 1936 to 1943. He was a Common Pleas Judge for Richland County from 1943 to 1959.

== Federal judicial service ==
Kalbfleisch was nominated by President Dwight D. Eisenhower on August 21, 1959, to a seat on the United States District Court for the Northern District of Ohio vacated by Judge Paul Charles Weick. He was confirmed by the United States Senate on September 14, 1959, and received his commission on September 21, 1959. He served as Chief Judge from 1967 to 1969. He assumed senior status on September 30, 1970. Kalbfleisch served in that capacity until his death on April 1, 1990.

== Sources ==
Legal offices
Preceded by Paul Charles Weick	Judge of the United States District Court for the Northern District of Ohio; 1959–1970	Succeeded by Nicholas Joseph Walinski Jr.
Preceded by James C. Connell	Chief Judge of the United States District Court for the Northern District of Ohio; 1967–1969	Succeeded by Frank J. Battisti
