= David M. Toepfer =

American federal prosecutor

David M. Toepfer is an American federal prosecutor who has served as the United States Attorney for the Northern District of Ohio since 2025.

== Early life and education ==
Toepfer was born in Warren, Ohio. He graduated with a Bachelor of Science in business administration, magna cum laude, from Youngstown State University and earned a Juris Doctor from the University of Akron School of Law.

== Career ==
Toepfer initially served as an assistant prosecuting attorney for two years in Portage County, handling felony and misdemeanor cases in juvenile and municipal courts. He later worked as an assistant prosecuting attorney in Trumbull County.

In 2008, Toepfer joined the United States Attorney's Office for the Northern District of Ohio as an Assistant United States Attorney in the Youngstown office. In 2010, he received the Department of Justice Director's Award for leading the Violence and Gun Reduction Interdiction Program. He later served as branch chief for Youngstown and Akron.

In 2025, President Donald Trump nominated Toepfer to serve as United States Attorney for the Northern District of Ohio. After his confirmation hearings were delayed in the Senate, Attorney General Pam Bondi appointed him to the position in July 2025. He was sworn in for a 120-day term and confirmed by the United States Senate in October 2025.
