= John R. Adams =

American judge (born 1955)

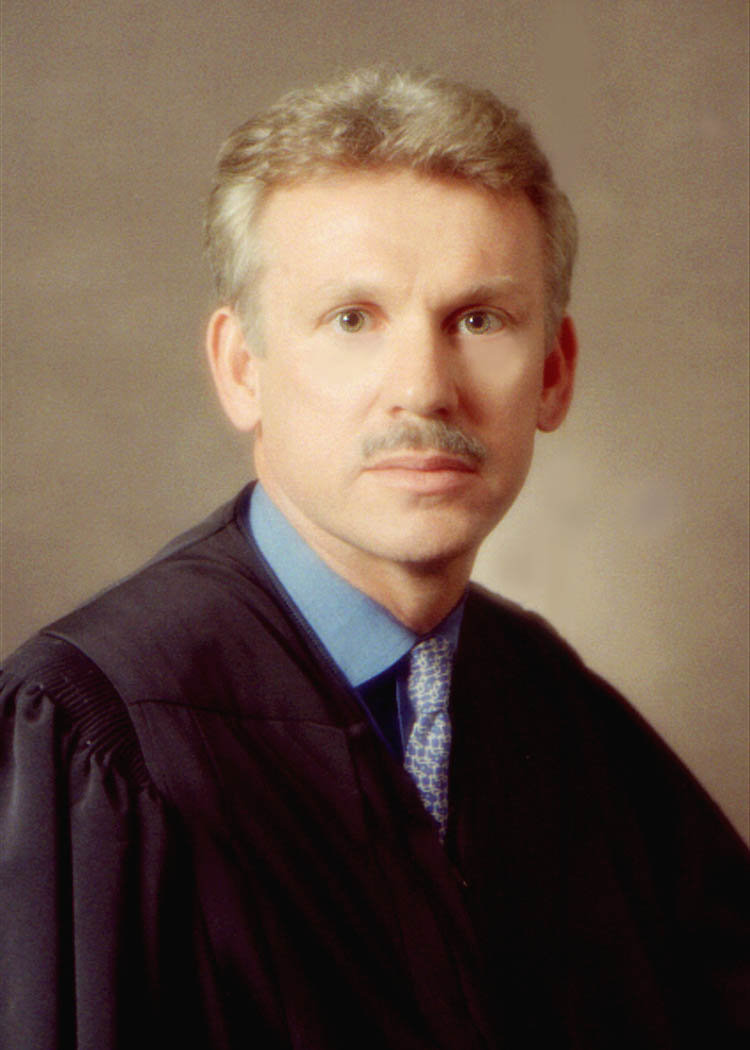

Judge of the United States District Court for the Northern District of Ohio
- Incumbent
- Assumed office February 12, 2003
- Appointed by: George W. Bush
- Preceded by: George Washington White

Personal details
- Born: John Randell Adams Jr. 1955 (age 70–71) Orrville, Ohio, U.S.
- Party: Republican
- Education: Bowling Green State University (BS); University of Akron (JD)

John Randell Adams Jr. (born 1955) is a United States district judge of the United States District Court for the Northern District of Ohio.

== Education and career ==
Adams was born in Orrville, Ohio, and received a Bachelor of Science degree from Bowling Green State University in 1978, followed by a Juris Doctor from University of Akron School of Law in 1983. He was a law clerk to W. F. Spicer of the Ohio Court of Common Pleas from 1983 to 1984. He then entered the private practice of law in Ohio until 1999, also working as an Assistant prosecutor in the Summit County Prosecutor's Office, from 1986 to 1989. He was a judge to the Summit County Court of Common Pleas, Ohio from 1999 to 2003.

== District court service ==
On January 7, 2003, Adams was nominated by President George W. Bush to a seat on the United States District Court for the Northern District of Ohio vacated by George Washington White. Adams was confirmed by the United States Senate on February 10, 2003, and received his commission on February 12, 2003.

== Dispute with Mayor Don Plusquellic ==
On February 3, 2015, Akron Mayor Don Plusquellic wrote a letter to Judge Adams, asking Judge Adams to recuse himself from any cases involving the city of Akron. In the letter, Plusquellic argues that Judge Adams displays a "personal negative bias towards me, and more significantly the City of Akron." He points to two cases in front of Judge Adams, one involving promotions within the city's fire department, and another case against the EPA dealing with sewer runoff problems.

Mayor Plusquellic accuses Judge Adams of judicial impropriety when Adams was a state court judge, saying "Your bias towards me personally was evident on occasions when you were trying to please the Summit County chair of the Republican Party. During a meeting in your office, while you were Common Pleas Judge, you tried to persuade a top law enforcement official to go after me and my wife because you thought I influenced someone to give my wife a job at the Oriana House."

Mayor Plusquellic ends the letter by saying "You have created an atmosphere where nobody believes that you are ruling on these cases based on the law, but rather, on your obvious bias towards me and the City."

In a follow-up article from the editorial board of the Akron Beacon Journal, the board noted that Judge Adams is unable to respond to the allegations because of judicial ethics. The Akron Bar Association argued the Mayor should have filed a formal motion with the court, rather than "delivering blows from the op-ed page of the newspaper." The editorial board goes on to argue that "On too many occasions, Judge Adams has failed to measure up. Many who practice and work in the federal court long have been dismayed. They have seen and discussed the displays of poor temper, the careless treatment, the absence of reason, the mean spirit. This behavior has become a problem for the Akron community." The editorial board cites two cases where Judge Adams was overturned by the 6th Circuit Court of Appeals. Per the editorial board: "Recall that in November 2013, the federal appeals court in Cincinnati reversed, vacated and dismissed the public sanctions Judge Adams imposed on a public defender. A three-judge panel unanimously found no basis for what the judge did, or any hint of the bad faith the judge claimed that he saw. His actions were reckless." The editorial board goes on by saying: "A year ago, the same appeals court took the rare step of removing a federal disabilities act case from Judge Adams. A three-judge panel, again unanimously, acknowledged that 'reassignment is an extraordinary power,' yet it had little choice, the judge revealing 'such a high degree of favoritism or antagonism as to make fair judgment impossible.' These are not isolated episodes. They help in setting the backdrop for Mayor Plusquellic taking his extraordinary step."

== Controversies ==
In 2013, the United States Court of Appeals for the Sixth Circuit admonished Adams for publicly reprimanding federal public defender Debra Migdal for issuing subpoenas in a criminal case, writing that the judge abused his discretion and that he "relied on clearly erroneous factual findings."

Two judicial conduct panels have found Adams committed misconduct when he issued an order in 2013 to a magistrate judge who missed a deadline to submit a report and recommendation in a Social Security case. Both reports also referenced other examples of problematic behavior, from being unwilling to engage with his colleagues on the bench, being hostile toward magistrate judges or, in one instance, blocking in an intern's car when the intern accidentally parked in Adams' space.

In 2015, the appellate court removed Adams from hearing a lawsuit filed by a group of firefighters against the city of Akron alleging discrimination in the city's promotion process. The court ruled that Adams "contributed greatly" to delays in what ended up being litigation that stretched out over a decade.

In 2016, the panels ordered Adams to undergo a mental-health examination, and the judge sued in federal court in Washington, D.C. to fight the order.

Also in 2016, the appellate court forced Adams to recuse himself from a criminal case involving a man charged with creating and passing counterfeit money. Adams had refused to step aside even after the defendant claimed he frequently used heroin with the judge's brother and nephew.

In 2018, the appellate court removed Adams from hearing the case of two men arrested with more than 200 pounds of cocaine to Cleveland, saying that Adams appeared ready to give harsh sentences before he had all the necessary information. The panel ruled the case must be reassigned "to maintain the integrity of our judicial system and to ensure that these cases are heard by a judge whose impartiality cannot reasonably be questioned."

== Sources ==
Legal offices
Preceded by George Washington White	United States District Court for the Northern District of Ohio; 2003–present	Incumbent
