= Paul Ramon =

Paul Ramon may refer to:

- Paul Ramon, pseudonym of Paul McCartney
- Paul Ramon Matia (born 1937), American judge
