= Frank J. Battisti =

American judge

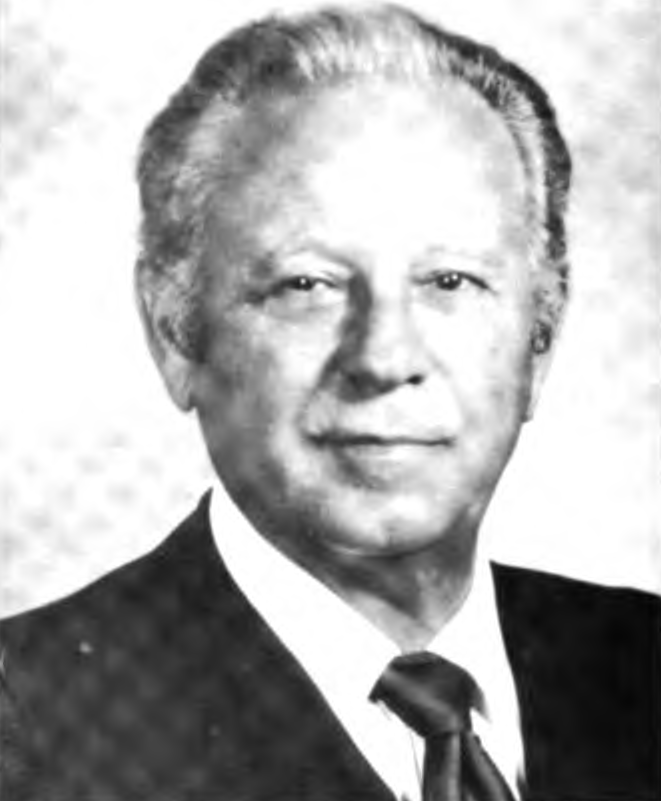

Senior Judge of the United States District Court for the Northern District of Ohio
- In office April 1, 1994 – October 19, 1994

Chief Judge of the United States District Court for the Northern District of Ohio
- In office 1969–1990
- Preceded by: Girard Edward Kalbfleisch
- Succeeded by: Thomas Demetrios Lambros

Judge of the United States District Court for the Northern District of Ohio
- In office September 22, 1961 – April 1, 1994
- Appointed by: John F. Kennedy
- Preceded by: Seat established by 75 Stat. 80
- Succeeded by: Peter C. Economus

Personal details
- Born: Frank Joseph Battisti; October 4, 1922 Youngstown, Ohio, U.S.
- Died: October 19, 1994 (aged 72) Cleveland, Ohio, U.S.
- Resting place: Calvary Cemetery; Cleveland, Ohio
- Education: Ohio University (A.B.); Harvard Law School (J.D.)

Frank Joseph Battisti (October 4, 1922 – October 19, 1994) was a United States district judge of the United States District Court for the Northern District of Ohio. Battisti's career featured groundbreaking—and sometimes controversial—rulings, notably his finding in 1976 that the Cleveland public school system was guilty of racial segregation. Two years earlier, in 1974, he dismissed a case against eight members of the Ohio Army National Guard accused of violating the civil rights of four Kent State University students who were shot dead in 1970. In the 1980s, he presided over a high-profile case involving Cleveland autoworker John Demjanjuk, who was deported amid charges that he committed war crimes in Nazi-occupied Eastern Europe. During his decades as a jurist, Battisti was honored by various professional and civic organizations, but he was also a target of criticism.

== Education and career ==
Battisti was born to Italian immigrant parents Eugene and Jennie (Dalesandro) Battisti, on October 4, 1922, in the Hazelton district of Youngstown, Ohio, a steel-production center near the Pennsylvania border. After graduating from Youngstown's East High School, Battisti served as an army combat engineer in the United States Army during World War II. He was later commissioned as an officer in military intelligence. Upon his return from Europe, he received an Artium Baccalaureus degree in 1947 from Ohio University and a Juris Doctor in 1950 from Harvard Law School. Battisti served as assistant attorney general for the State of Ohio from 1950 to 1951. He was an attorney adviser for the United States Army Corps of Engineers from 1951 to 1952. He was an instructor of law at the Youngstown University Law School (now defunct) from 1952 to 1954. He was in private practice in Youngstown from 1952 to 1958. He was the first assistant director of law for Youngstown from 1954 to 1958. He was director and executive secretary of the Youngstown Symphony Orchestra from 1954 to 1958. He was a Judge of the Mahoning County, Ohio Court of Common Pleas from 1958 to 1961.

== Federal judicial service ==
Battisti was nominated by President John F. Kennedy on August 23, 1961, to the United States District Court for the Northern District of Ohio, to a new seat authorized by 75 Stat. 80. He was confirmed by the United States Senate on September 21, 1961, and received his commission on September 22, 1961. At the time of his appointment at age 39, he was the youngest federal judge in the country. He served as Chief Judge from 1969 to 1990. He was a member of the Judicial Conference of the United States from 1981 to 1984. He assumed senior status on April 1, 1994. His service terminated on October 19, 1994, due to his death in Cleveland.

== Notable cases ==
On the bench, Battisti earned a reputation as a jurist who was willing to take on the most controversial cases. Some of his rulings generated heated debate, including his acquittal of eight former Ohio National Guardsmen implicated in the shooting deaths of four students at Kent State University on May 4, 1970. As his obituary in The New York Times stated, "The Kent State case came to an abrupt halt when [Judge Battisti] dismissed it on the ground that Government prosecutors had failed to prove 'beyond a reasonable doubt' that guardsmen had willfully intended to deprive the students of their rights".

He is primarily remembered, however, for his historic ruling in Robert Anthony Reed III v. Rhodes, which found that the Board of Education for the City of Cleveland public school system had violated the law by practicing racial segregation. Battisti's comprehensive order for desegregation featured 14 components, including a provision reassigning students to achieve integration. This component precipitated an outcry among local opponents of "court-ordered busing." While Battisti was lauded by supporters for what they termed as his courage and fortitude, he faced criticism from the Cleveland Board of Education and segments of the larger community. His landmark ruling in the Cleveland desegregation case later prompted fellow Youngstown native Judge Nathaniel R. Jones, of the United States Court of Appeals for the Sixth Circuit, to characterize Battisti as "an unlikely hero" of the civil rights movement. Jones said, "He withstood much of the hostility and acrimony, bitterness and ostracism of the community in order to be true to his oath and the Constitution". Even critics of the ruling were disinclined to question Battisti's motives. Colleagues described him as a deeply religious man whose abhorrence of racial injustice was profound and sincere.

In 1986, Battisti ordered the deportation to Israel of Ukrainian immigrant John Demjanjuk, on the grounds that Demanjuk had misrepresented himself in his immigration application. The protracted case garnered national and international media attention. An obituary noted that upon Battisti's death, "scores of cases remained on his docket, including a rehearing of the Demjanjuk case ordered by the United States Supreme Court". Demanjuk was subsequently deported, and eventually convicted of war crimes in Israel. That conviction was overturned by an Israeli appeals court. Battisti's order of deportation was upheld.

In September 1985, a panel of federal appellate judges determined that Battisti "had indeed assumed too much power and ordered him to share it with his peers". Nine members of the 11-member Northern District of Ohio contended that Battisti had assumed too much power in decision-making. "The nine had set up a system in which the majority decided court policy in May 1985", an obituary reported, "but Battisti conceded that he ignored it on the ground that 'the chief judge must make the decisions'".

== Personal ==
Battisti was married to Gloria Joy Karpinski on August 10, 1963. The couple had no children. Gloria Battisti later recalled that, in the aftermath of the Cleveland decision, the couple received death threats and required the protection of the United States Marshal Service and the Federal Bureau of Investigation. Gloria Battisti died at the age of 84 on January 18, 2010.

== Later years and legacy ==
During his lifetime, Battisti received many honors for his judicial service. In 1972, he was elected president of the United States Sixth District Judges Association; and the following year, he received an honorary doctor of law degree from St. Francis College, in Loretto, Pennsylvania. In 1974, he was honored with a plaque by B'nai B'rith for his commitment to civil rights. The Association of Trial Lawyers of America named him as the country's outstanding trial judge in 1978. In 1979, United States Representative John Ashbrook (R-OH), who opposed the desegregation plan for the Cleveland Public Schools District, introduced a resolution to the House Judiciary Committee seeking to have Battisti impeached. The resolution, perceived as a political stunt, did not garner support, was not referred out of committee, and no Congressional action was taken.

Battisti's death on October 19, 1994, received coverage in the regional and national media. Faye Kaufman, Battisti's secretary at the United States District Court for the Northern District of Ohio, reported that he died as a result of typhus and Rocky Mountain spotted fever, contracted during a yearly fishing trip in the West. Battisti's legacy was praised by Daniel McMullen, a former director of the Office on School Monitoring and Community Relations, the entity created by the district court to oversee compliance by the Board of Education with the desegregation orders. "Battisti believed and stood for something much larger than the minutiae of constitutional doctrine", McMullen said. "He possessed the intellect to understand the sweep of history". Battisti was interred at Cleveland's Calvary Cemetery.

== See also ==
- List of United States federal judges by longevity of service

== Sources ==
Legal offices
Preceded by Seat established by 75 Stat. 80	Judge of the United States District Court for the Northern District of Ohio; 1961–1994	Succeeded by Peter C. Economus
Preceded by Girard Edward Kalbfleisch	Chief Judge of the United States District Court for the Northern District of Ohio; 1969–1990	Succeeded by Thomas Demetrios Lambros
