= Peter C. Economus =

American judge (born 1943)

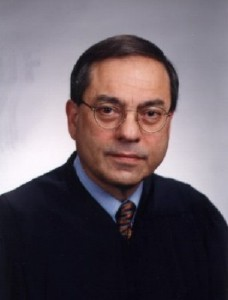

Senior Judge of the United States District Court for the Northern District of Ohio
- Incumbent
- Assumed office July 3, 2009

Judge of the United States District Court for the Northern District of Ohio
- In office June 30, 1995 – July 3, 2009
- Appointed by: Bill Clinton
- Preceded by: Frank J. Battisti
- Succeeded by: Benita Y. Pearson

Personal details
- Born: June 10, 1943 (age 82) Youngstown, Ohio, U.S.
- Education: Youngstown State University (BA); University of Akron (JD)

Peter Constantine Economus (born June 10, 1943) is an inactive Senior United States district judge of the United States District Court for the Northern District of Ohio.

== Education and career ==
Economus was born in Youngstown, Ohio. He received a Bachelor of Arts degree from Youngstown State University in 1967, and received a Juris Doctor from the University of Akron School of Law in 1970. He was a staff attorney at the Mahoning County Legal Assistance Association, Ohio from 1971 to 1972. He was in private practice in Youngstown from 1972 to 1982. He was a judge of the Mahoning County Ohio Court of Common Pleas from 1982 to 1995.

=== Federal judicial service ===
Economus was nominated to the United States District Court for the Northern District of Ohio by President Bill Clinton on February 28, 1995, to a seat vacated by Judge Frank J. Battisti. He was confirmed by the United States Senate on June 30, 1995, and received his commission the same day. He assumed senior status on July 3, 2009, and inactive senior status on September 30, 2015.

== Sources ==
Legal offices
| Preceded by Frank J. Battisti | Judge of the United States District Court for the Northern District of Ohio; 1995–2009 | Succeeded by Benita Y. Pearson |
