= Pamela Barker =

American judge (born 1957)

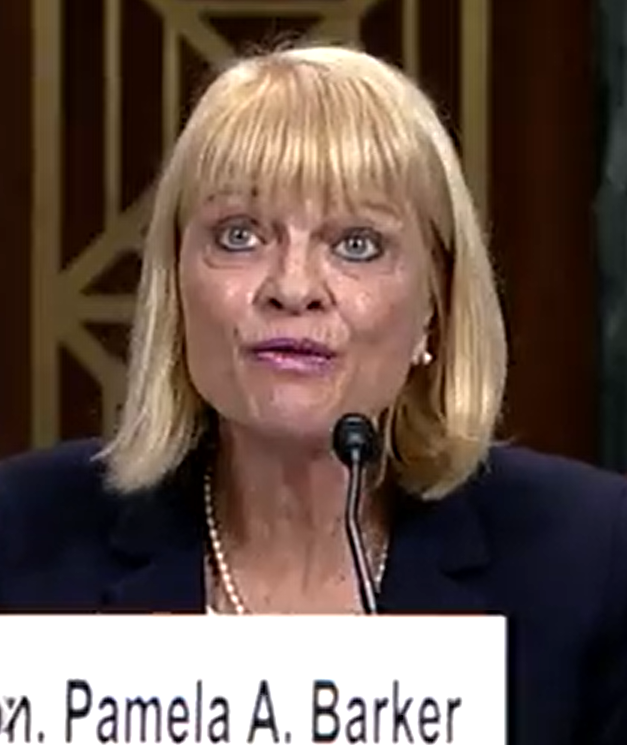

Judge of the United States District Court for the Northern District of Ohio
- Incumbent
- Assumed office June 18, 2019
- Appointed by: Donald Trump
- Preceded by: Donald C. Nugent

Judge of the Cuyahoga County Court of Common Pleas
- In office September 19, 2011 – June 18, 2019
- Appointed by: John Kasich
- Preceded by: Steven Terry
- Succeeded by: J. Philip Calabrese

Personal details
- Born: Pamela Ann Addison; 1957 (age 68–69) Cleveland, Ohio, U.S.
- Party: Republican
- Education: Kenyon College (BA); Ohio State University (JD)

Pamela Ann Barker (née Addison; born 1957) is a United States district judge of the United States District Court for the Northern District of Ohio. She formerly served as a Judge of the Cuyahoga County Court of Common Pleas.

== Early life and education ==
Barker was born in 1957 in Cleveland, Ohio. She earned her Bachelor of Arts, magna cum laude, from Kenyon College, where she was inducted into Phi Beta Kappa, and her Juris Doctor from the Ohio State University Moritz College of Law.

== Legal career ==
Prior to ascending to the bench, Barker spent twenty-nine years representing individuals, small businesses, and corporations, with a particular emphasis on insurance litigation. From 2000 to 2011, she served as a Mayor's Court Magistrate and Juvenile Diversion Magistrate for the City of Brecksville, Ohio.

She was appointed to the Cuyahoga County Court of Common Pleas by Governor John Kasich and assumed office on September 19, 2011. Barker was elected to the court in November 2012. Her state court service ended on June 18, 2019, upon her elevation to the federal bench.

== Federal judicial service ==
On September 29, 2017, Ohio Senators Sherrod Brown and Rob Portman recommended Barker for a federal judgeship. On April 10, 2018, President Donald Trump announced his intent to nominate Barker to serve as a United States District Judge of the United States District Court for the Northern District of Ohio. On April 12, 2018, her nomination was sent to the Senate. She was nominated to the seat vacated by Judge Donald C. Nugent, who assumed senior status on January 1, 2017. On October 10, 2018, a hearing on her nomination was held before the Senate Judiciary Committee.

On January 3, 2019, her nomination was returned to the President under Rule XXXI, Paragraph 6 of the Senate. On January 23, 2019, President Trump announced his intent to renominate Barker for a federal judgeship. Her nomination was sent to the Senate later that day. On February 7, 2019, her nomination was reported out of committee by a voice vote. On June 11, 2019, the Senate invoked cloture on her nomination by a 89–7 vote. On June 12, 2019, her nomination was confirmed by a 91–5 vote. She received her judicial commission on June 18, 2019. She was sworn in on June 19, 2019.

== Personal life ==
Her parents are William D. Addison and Peggy Ann Addison. She is married to Jeffery L. Barker, with whom she has two sons.

Legal offices
Preceded by Steven Terry	Judge of the Cuyahoga County Court of Common Pleas; 2011–2019	Succeeded by J. Philip Calabrese
Preceded by Donald C. Nugent	Judge of the United States District Court for the Northern District of Ohio; 2019–present	Incumbent
