= Donald C. Nugent =

American judge

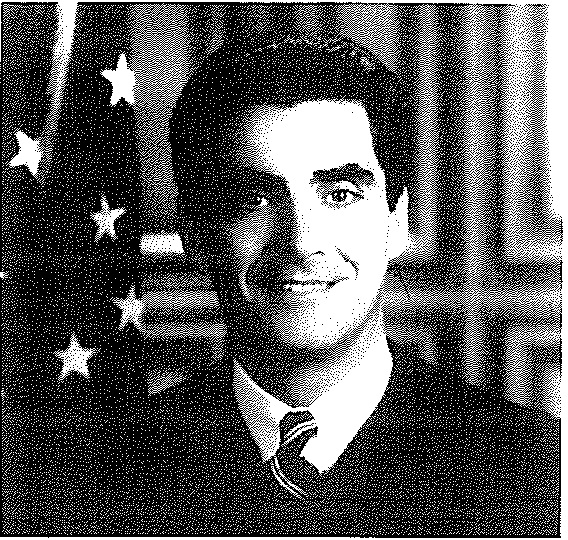

Senior Judge of the United States District Court for the Northern District of Ohio
- Incumbent
- Assumed office January 1, 2017

Judge of the United States District Court for the Northern District of Ohio
- In office June 30, 1995 – January 1, 2017
- Appointed by: Bill Clinton
- Preceded by: Thomas Demetrios Lambros
- Succeeded by: Pamela Barker

Personal details
- Born: March 7, 1948 (age 78) Minneapolis, Minnesota, U.S.
- Education: Xavier University (BA); Cleveland State University (JD); University of Nevada, Reno (MJS)

Donald Clark Nugent (born March 7, 1948) is a senior United States district judge of the United States District Court for the Northern District of Ohio.

== Education ==
Nugent was born in Minneapolis, Minnesota. He received his Bachelor of Arts degree from Xavier University in Ohio in 1970. He served in the United States Marine Corps from 1970 to 1971 before being admitted to the Cleveland State University College of Law, where he earned his Juris Doctor in 1974. Nugent received a Master of Judicial Studies from National Judicial College at the University of Nevada, Reno in 1994.

== Career ==
Nugent was in private practice in Cuyahoga County, Ohio from 1974 to 1985. He was an assistant prosecuting attorney of Cuyahoga County from 1975 to 1985 and was a Cuyahoga County Court of Common Pleas judge from 1985 to 1992. He was a judge to the Eighth District Ohio Court of Appeals from 1993 to 1995.

=== Federal judicial service ===
President Bill Clinton nominated Nugent to the United States District Court for the Northern District of Ohio on April 27, 1995, to the seat vacated by Thomas Demetrios Lambros. Confirmed by the Senate on June 30, 1995, he received commission the same day. He assumed senior status on January 1, 2017.

In 2014, the U.S. Court of Appeals for the Sixth Circuit removed Nugent from a First Amendment lawsuit because he was "hostile and biased" toward the physician plaintiffs who successfully challenged a state restriction on campaign contributions.

Legal offices
Preceded by Thomas Demetrios Lambros	Judge of the United States District Court for the Northern District of Ohio; 1995–2017	Succeeded by Pamela Barker
