= J. Philip Calabrese =

American judge (born 1971)

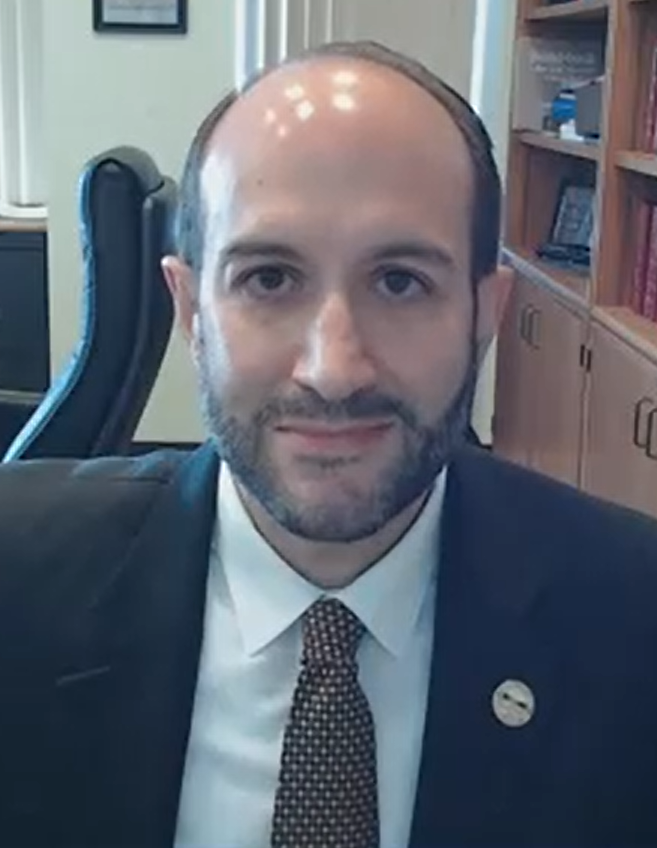
- Calabrese in 2020

Judge of the United States District Court for the Northern District of Ohio
- Incumbent
- Assumed office December 3, 2020
- Appointed by: Donald Trump
- Preceded by: Christopher A. Boyko

Judge of the Cuyahoga County Court of Common Pleas
- In office July 3, 2019 – December 3, 2020
- Appointed by: Mike DeWine
- Preceded by: Pamela Barker
- Succeeded by: William Vodrey

Personal details
- Born: 1971 (age 54–55) Evanston, Illinois, U.S.
- Party: Republican
- Education: College of the Holy Cross (BA); Harvard University (JD)

Jude Philip Calabrese (born 1971) is an American lawyer and jurist who serves as a United States district judge of the United States District Court for the Northern District of Ohio. He formerly served as a judge of the Cuyahoga County Court of Common Pleas from 2019 to 2020.

== Early life and education ==
Calabrese was born in 1971 in Evanston, Illinois. He graduated from the College of the Holy Cross with a Bachelor of Arts, summa cum laude, in classics and religious studies in 1993 with membership in Phi Beta Kappa and Alpha Sigma Nu. As an undergraduate, Calabrese was a legislative assistant to state representatives Eric Fingerhut and Judy Robson, and state senator Lynn Adelman.

After graduating from Holy Cross, Calabrese earned a Fulbright scholarship to study ancient history at the American School of Classical Studies at Athens from 1993 to 1994. In 1997, he enrolled at Harvard Law School, graduating with a Juris Doctor (J.D.), cum laude, in 2000. He had been a summer associate at the law firm of Jones Day in 1998 and 1999.

== Career ==
After finishing law school, Calabrese served as a law clerk to Judge Alice M. Batchelder of the United States Court of Appeals for the Sixth Circuit. He was a partner with Porter, Wright, Morris & Arthur, where he co-chaired the firm's class action practice. Since fall 2017, he has served as an adjunct professor at Case Western Reserve University School of Law.

He has been a member of the City Club of Cleveland since 2001 and of the Federalist Society since 2005.

=== State court service ===
On June 21, 2019, Governor Mike DeWine appointed Calabrese as a judge of the Cuyahoga County Court of Common Pleas to fill the vacancy left by Judge Pamela Barker's appointment to the United States District Court for the Northern District of Ohio. He was sworn into office on July 3, 2019. His state court service ended in 2020 after he became a federal judge.

=== Federal judicial service ===
On February 26, 2020, President Donald Trump announced his intent to nominate Calabrese to serve as a United States district judge of the United States District Court for the Northern District of Ohio. On March 3, 2020, his nomination was sent to the Senate. President Trump nominated Calabrese to the seat vacated by Judge Christopher A. Boyko, who assumed senior status on January 6, 2020. As Senators Sherrod Brown and Rob Portman relied on the recommendations of a bipartisan commission, Calabrese received the support of both Democrats and Republicans in Ohio.

On July 29, 2020, a hearing was held on his nomination before the Senate Judiciary Committee. On September 17, 2020, his nomination was reported out of committee by a 12–10 vote. On December 1, 2020, the United States Senate invoked cloture on his nomination by a 58–35 vote. His nomination was confirmed later that day by a 58–35 vote. He received his judicial commission on December 3, 2020. He was sworn in on December 5, 2020.

Legal offices
Preceded by Pamela Barker	Judge of the Cuyahoga County Court of Common Pleas; 2019–2020	Succeeded by William Vodrey
Preceded by Christopher A. Boyko	Judge of the United States District Court for the Northern District of Ohio; 2020–present	Incumbent
