= Robert B. Krupansky =

American judge (1921–2004)

Senior Judge of the United States Court of Appeals for the Sixth Circuit
- In office July 1, 1991 – November 8, 2004

Judge of the United States Court of Appeals for the Sixth Circuit
- In office March 10, 1982 – July 1, 1991
- Appointed by: Ronald Reagan
- Preceded by: Paul Charles Weick
- Succeeded by: Karen Nelson Moore

Judge of the United States District Court for the Northern District of Ohio
- In office October 16, 1970 – March 19, 1982
- Appointed by: Richard Nixon
- Preceded by: Seat established by 84 Stat. 294
- Succeeded by: Sam H. Bell

Personal details
- Born: Robert Bazil Krupansky; August 15, 1921 Cleveland, Ohio
- Died: November 4, 2004 (aged 83) Cleveland, Ohio
- Education: Case Western Reserve University (BA); Case Western Reserve University School of Law (JD)

Robert Bazil Krupansky (August 15, 1921 – November 8, 2004) was a United States circuit judge of the United States Court of Appeals for the Sixth Circuit and a United States district judge of the United States District Court for the Northern District of Ohio.

== Education and career ==
Born in Cleveland, Ohio, Krupansky was in the United States Army Air Forces from 1942 to 1946. He received a Bachelor of Arts degree from Case Western Reserve University in 1946, and a Bachelor of Laws from Case Western Reserve University School of Law in 1948. He was a United States Air Force Reserve Colonel from 1946 to 1972. He was in private practice in Cleveland from 1948 to 1951. He was an assistant state attorney general of Ohio from 1951 to 1957. He was the Director of the Ohio Department of Liquor Control from 1957 to 1958. He was a judge on the Court of Common Pleas, Cuyahoga County, Ohio from 1958 to 1959. He was in private practice in Cleveland from 1960 to 1969. He was a legal consultant for the City of Mayfield Heights, Ohio from 1960 to 1964. He was a special counsel to the state attorney general of Ohio from 1964 to 1968. He was the United States Attorney for the Northern District of Ohio from 1969 to 1970. His First Assistant attorney was Robert Jones and additional details of Krupansky's work as U.S. Attorney may be found at Robert Walter Jones JD Library and Archive.

== Federal judicial service ==
Krupansky was nominated by President Richard Nixon on October 7, 1970, to the United States District Court for the Northern District of Ohio, to a new seat created by 84 Stat. 294. He was confirmed by the United States Senate on October 13, 1970, and received his commission on October 16, 1970. Krupansky served in that capacity until March 19, 1982, due to elevation to the Sixth Circuit.

Krupansky was nominated by President Ronald Reagan on January 28, 1982, to a seat on the United States Court of Appeals for the Sixth Circuit vacated by Judge Paul Charles Weick. He was confirmed by the Senate on March 4, 1982, and received his commission on March 10, 1982. He assumed senior status on July 1, 1991. Krupansky served in that capacity until his death on November 8, 2004, in Cleveland.

Krupansky's sister, Blanche Krupansky, was a justice of the Ohio Supreme Court.

== Sources ==
Legal offices
Preceded by Seat established by 84 Stat. 294	Judge of the United States District Court for the Northern District of Ohio; 1970–1982	Succeeded by Sam H. Bell
Preceded by Paul Charles Weick	Judge of the United States Court of Appeals for the Sixth Circuit; 1982–1991	Succeeded by Karen Nelson Moore
