= David Moylan =

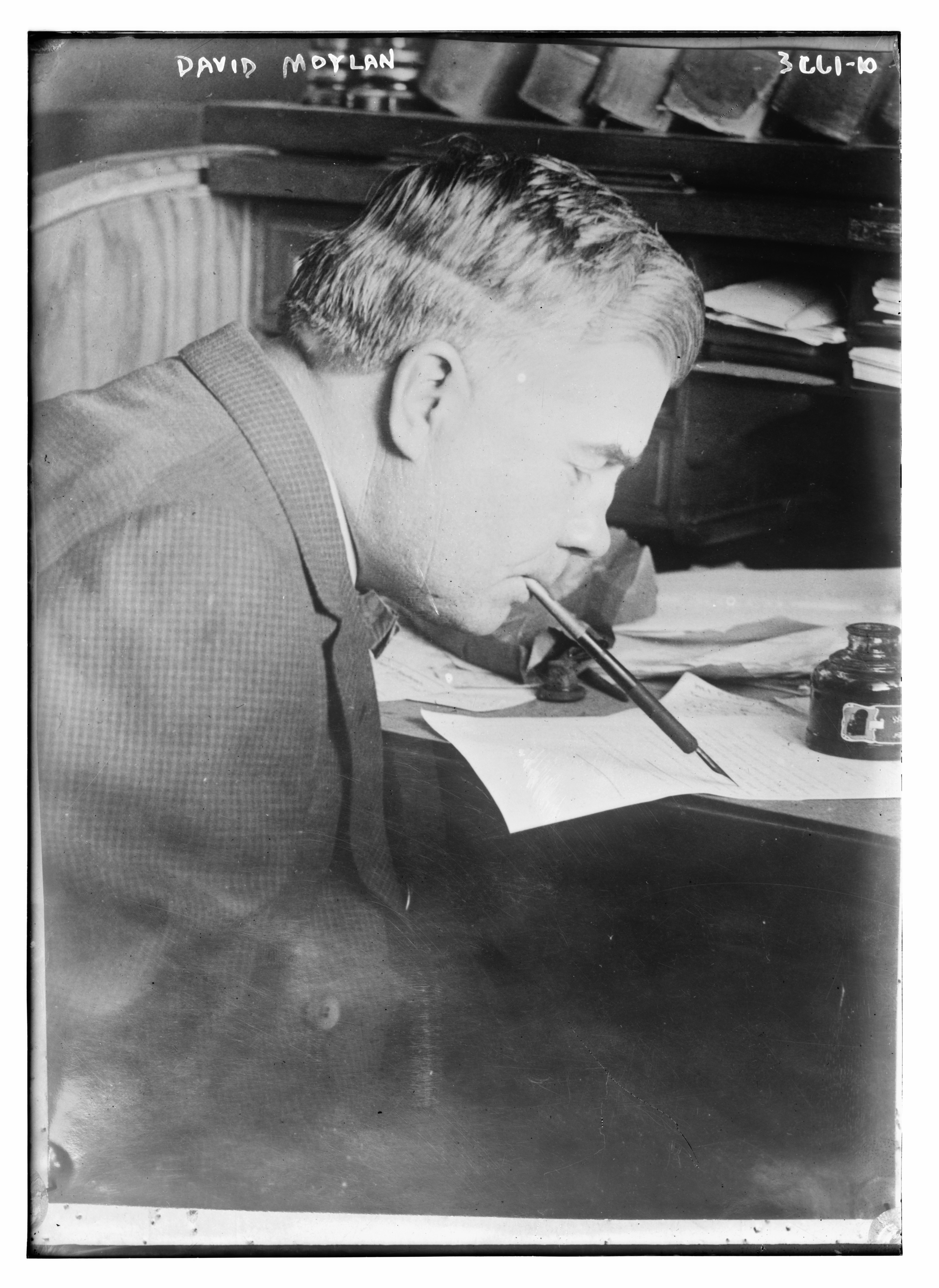
Judge David Moylan in 1916

David M. Moylan (December 25, 1874 – May 17, 1942) was a member of the Cleveland City Council and later a municipal judge, who had lost both his arms in a railroad accident.

== Biography ==
He was born on Christmas Day, December 25, 1874 in Cleveland, Ohio.

Around 1905 he was a railroad switchman in Cleveland, Ohio when he was hit by a train and lost both arms.

He attended law school and was admitted to the bar in 1908. In 1912 he was elected to the Cleveland City Council. In 1915 he was elected to the Cleveland Municipal Court.

He died of a heart attack in Cleveland, Ohio on May 17, 1942. His seat on the judicial bench was filled by Perry B. Jackson.
