= Emerich B. Freed =

American judge

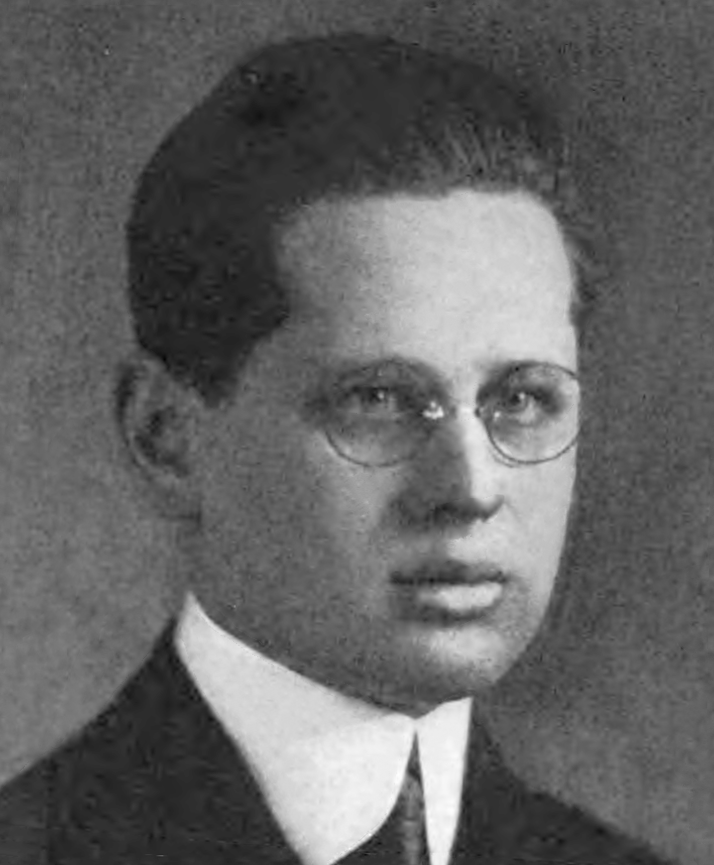
- c. 1921

Judge of the United States District Court for the Northern District of Ohio
- In office October 7, 1941 – December 4, 1955
- Appointed by: Franklin D. Roosevelt
- Preceded by: Seat established by 55 Stat. 148
- Succeeded by: Paul Charles Weick

Personal details
- Born: Emerich Burt Freed; November 22, 1897 Budapest, Austria-Hungary
- Died: December 4, 1955 (aged 58)
- Education: Case Western Reserve University (A.B.); Case Western Reserve University School of Law (LL.B.)

Emerich Burt Freed (November 22, 1897 – December 4, 1955) was a United States district judge of the United States District Court for the Northern District of Ohio.

== Education and career ==
Born in Budapest, Austria-Hungary (now Hungary) in 1897, Freed attended grammar school there, and graduated from Central High School in Cleveland, Ohio. Freed received an Artium Baccalaureus degree from Western Reserve University (now Case Western Reserve University) in 1918 and a Bachelor of Laws from Case Western Reserve University School of Law in 1920. He was in private practice in Ohio from 1918 to 1929, and was thereafter a first assistant in the Prosecuting Attorney's Office of Cuyahoga County, Ohio from 1929 to 1932, and prosecuting attorney in that office from 1932 to 1933. He was the United States Attorney for the Northern District of Ohio from 1933 to 1941.

== Federal judicial service ==
On September 11, 1941, Freed was nominated by President Franklin D. Roosevelt to a new seat on the United States District Court for the Northern District of Ohio created by 55 Stat. 148. He was confirmed by the United States Senate on October 2, 1941, and received his commission on October 7, 1941, serving in that capacity until his death on December 4, 1955.

== See also ==
- List of Jewish American jurists

== Sources ==
Legal offices
| Preceded by Seat established by 55 Stat. 148 | Judge of the United States District Court for the Northern District of Ohio; 1941–1955 | Succeeded by Paul Charles Weick |
