= Christopher A. Boyko =

American judge (born 1954)

Christopher Allan Boyko
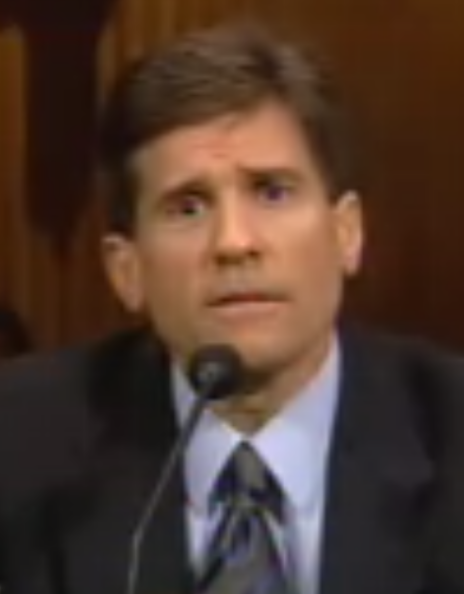

Senior Judge of the United States District Court for the Northern District of Ohio
- Incumbent
- Assumed office January 6, 2020

Judge of the United States District Court for the Northern District of Ohio
- In office January 3, 2005 – January 6, 2020
- Appointed by: George W. Bush
- Preceded by: Paul Ramon Matia
- Succeeded by: J. Philip Calabrese

Personal details
- Born: Christopher Allan Boyko; October 10, 1954 (age 71) Cleveland, Ohio, U.S.
- Education: Mount Union College (BA); Cleveland State University (JD)

Christopher Allan Boyko (born October 10, 1954) is a senior United States district judge of the United States District Court for the Northern District of Ohio.

== Education and career ==
Born in Cleveland, Ohio, Boyko is a second-generation Ukrainian American. He received a Bachelor of Arts degree from Mount Union College in 1976 and a Juris Doctor from the Cleveland State University College of Law in 1979. Master of Judicial Studies from the University of Nevada 2010. He was in private practice in Parma, Ohio, from 1979 to 1993, also working for the City of Parma as an assistant prosecutor from 1981 to 1987, and as a prosecutor and city Director of Law from 1987 to 1993. He was a judge on the Parma Municipal Court in 1993, and was an executive vice president/general counsel for Copy America, Inc. from 1994 to 1995. He was a judge of the Cuyahoga County Court of Common Pleas from 1996 to 2004.

== Federal judicial service ==
On July 22, 2004, Boyko was nominated by President George W. Bush to a seat on the United States District Court for the Northern District of Ohio vacated by Paul Ramon Matia. Boyko was confirmed by the United States Senate on November 21, 2004, and received his commission on January 3, 2005. He assumed senior status on January 6, 2020.

Legal offices
Preceded by Paul Ramon Matia	Judge of the United States District Court for the Northern District of Ohio; 2005–2020	Succeeded by J. Philip Calabrese
