= Paul Charles Weick =

American judge (1899–1997)

Senior Judge of the United States Court of Appeals for the Sixth Circuit
- In office December 31, 1981 – May 22, 1997

Chief Judge of the United States Court of Appeals for the Sixth Circuit
- In office 1963–1969
- Preceded by: Lester LeFevre Cecil
- Succeeded by: Harry Phillips

Judge of the United States Court of Appeals for the Sixth Circuit
- In office September 10, 1959 – December 31, 1981
- Appointed by: Dwight D. Eisenhower
- Preceded by: Florence E. Allen
- Succeeded by: Robert B. Krupansky

Judge of the United States District Court for the Northern District of Ohio
- In office March 29, 1956 – October 7, 1959
- Appointed by: Dwight D. Eisenhower
- Preceded by: Emerich B. Freed
- Succeeded by: Girard Edward Kalbfleisch

Personal details
- Born: Paul Charles Weick; August 25, 1899 Youngstown, Ohio, U.S.
- Died: May 22, 1997 (aged 97) Stow, Ohio, U.S.
- Education: University of Cincinnati College of Law (LLB)

Paul Charles Weick (August 25, 1899 – May 22, 1997) was a United States circuit judge of the United States Court of Appeals for the Sixth Circuit and previously was a United States district judge of the United States District Court for the Northern District of Ohio.

== Education and career ==
Born in Youngstown, Ohio, Weick was a member of the Student Army Training Corps in 1918. He received a Bachelor of Laws from the University of Cincinnati College of Law in 1920. He was in private practice in Akron, Ohio from 1920 to 1956, with a brief stint in Youngstown in 1927.

== Federal judicial service ==
Weick was nominated by President Dwight D. Eisenhower on February 27, 1956, to a seat on the United States District Court for the Northern District of Ohio vacated by Judge Emerich B. Freed. He was confirmed by the United States Senate on March 28, 1956, and received his commission the next day. Weick served in that capacity until October 7, 1959, due to his elevation to the Sixth Circuit.

Weick was nominated by President Eisenhower on August 5, 1959, to a seat on the United States Court of Appeals for the Sixth Circuit vacated by Judge Florence E. Allen. He was confirmed by the Senate on September 9, 1959, and received his commission the next day. He served as Chief Judge from 1963 to 1969 and as a member of the Judicial Conference of the United States from 1964 to 1969. He assumed senior status on December 31, 1981. Weick served in that capacity until his death on May 22, 1997, in Stow, Ohio.

== Sources ==
Legal offices
Preceded by Emerich B. Freed	Judge of the United States District Court for the Northern District of Ohio; 1956–1959	Succeeded by Girard Edward Kalbfleisch
Preceded by Florence E. Allen	Judge of the United States Court of Appeals for the Sixth Circuit; 1959–1981	Succeeded by Robert B. Krupansky
Preceded by Lester LeFevre Cecil	Chief Judge of the United States Court of Appeals for the Sixth Circuit; 1963–1969	Succeeded by Harry Phillips
