= Perry B. Jackson =

American judge

Perry Brooks Jackson (January 27, 1896 – March 20, 1986) was Ohio's first elected judge who was African American.

== Biography ==
Born in Zanesville, Ohio, Jackson was sworn in as judge in the State of Ohio in 1942. He served Cleveland and Cuyahoga County for 44 years before his death in 1986. Jackson married Fern Josephine Payne (d. 1983) in 1933. They had no children. Jackson died in Cleveland and was buried at Highland Park Cemetery.

=== Education ===
After graduating from Zanesville High School, Jackson worked his way through Western Reserve University (now Case Western Reserve University) and eventually graduated magna cum laude. Jackson earned his law degree from Western Reserve University School of Law in 1922.

=== Career ===
Jackson began his legal career practicing law in the Cleveland area. From 1923 to 1927 Jackson worked as an editor for of the city's black newspaper, the Cleveland Call. Jackson worked his way up to editor of the Cleveland Call. He left the position when the Cleveland Call merged with the Cleveland Post to become the Call and Post.

=== Public service ===
Jackson was elected to the Ohio Legislature in 1928, called the General Assembly, as an active Republican. Jackson was the first African American to win a county-wide election in Cuyahoga County—the County in which Cleveland, Ohio sits, which was at the time a bustling metropolis.

While a member of Ohio's General Assembly he was responsible for the adoption of permanent voter registration forms eliminating reference to color or race. He also was responsible for legislation pinning down the function of notaries public.

Jackson also served on Cleveland City Council. He was later appointed assistant police prosecutor (serving from July 1934-Aug. 1941), eventually becoming chief prosecutor for the City of Cleveland. From August 1941 to April 1942, Jackson served as secretary to the director of public utilities for Cleveland.

Jackson was appointed to the bench in Cleveland Municipal Court in 1942 to take the place of David Moylan. In 1945, Jackson won the first of three elections to the Cleveland Municipal Court, a six-year term. He won the second and third elections in 1951 and 1957.

In 1960, Jackson won election to the domestic relations division of Cuyahoga County Common Pleas Court, and subsequently was elected to terms in the Common Pleas general division.

He died on March 20, 1986.

== Legacy ==
Jackson was the first elected black judge in Ohio, and the first black American to win a Cuyahoga County-wide election. Not only did Jackson blaze electoral trails for black Americans, he also employed the legal justice system to combat segregation. Jackson was at a bar association meeting in the Hollenden Hotel in 1935, he sued the hotel, receiving $350 in damages after he was refused service. He was involved in the local NAACP and Urban League of Greater Cleveland. Jackson was very active in his community, serving in many organizations across Northeast Ohio, including the NAACP, the Cleveland Area Church Federation, Goodwill Industries and the Boy Scouts of America. A scholarship in his name continues to assist Zanesville High School graduates with their college expenses.

== See also ==
- List of African-American jurists
- List of first minority male lawyers and judges in Ohio
