= Paul Ramon Matia =

American judge (born 1937)

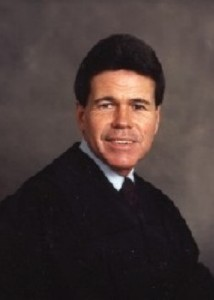

Senior Judge of the United States District Court for the Northern District of Ohio
- In office December 31, 2004 – May 31, 2005

Chief Judge of the United States District Court for the Northern District of Ohio
- In office 1999–2004
- Preceded by: George Washington White
- Succeeded by: James G. Carr

Judge of the United States District Court for the Northern District of Ohio
- In office November 18, 1991 – December 31, 2004
- Appointed by: George H. W. Bush
- Preceded by: Seat established by 104 Stat. 5089
- Succeeded by: Christopher A. Boyko

Member of the Ohio Senate from the 25th district
- In office January 1, 1979 – December 31, 1982
- Preceded by: Tony Celebrezze
- Succeeded by: Lee Fisher
- In office January 5, 1971 – December 31, 1974
- Preceded by: John Weeks
- Succeeded by: Tony Celebrezze

Personal details
- Born: Paul Ramon Matia; 1937 (age 88–89) Cleveland, Ohio, U.S.
- Party: Republican
- Education: Case Western Reserve University (BA); Harvard University (JD)

Paul Ramon Matia (born 1937) is a former United States district judge of the United States District Court for the Northern District of Ohio.

== Education and career ==
Matia was born in Cleveland, Ohio. He received a Bachelor of Arts degree from Case Western Reserve University in 1959. He received a Juris Doctor from Harvard Law School in 1962. He was in private practice in Fairview Park, Ohio from 1962 to 1963. He was a law clerk, Court of Common Pleas of Cuyahoga County, Ohio from 1963 to 1966. He was an assistant state attorney general of Ohio from 1966 to 1969. He was an administrative assistant to state attorney general of Ohio from 1969 to 1970. He was in private practice in Fairview Park from 1971 to 1974. He was a member of the Ohio State Senate from 1971 to 1975. He was in private practice in Cleveland from 1975 to 1985. He once again served in the state senate from 1979 to 1982 He was a Vice President of Van Meter, Ashbrook & Associates from 1982 to 1984. He was a judge on the Court of Common Pleas of Cuyahoga County, Ohio from 1985 to 1991.

== Federal judicial service ==
Matia was nominated by President George H. W. Bush on June 27, 1991, to the United States District Court for the Northern District of Ohio, to a new seat created by 104 Stat. 5089. He was confirmed by the United States Senate on November 15, 1991, and received his commission on November 18, 1991. He served as Chief Judge from 1999 to 2004. During his time as a judge, he was notable for restoring John Demjanjuk's United States citizenship in 1998 but later revoking it in 2002 after a new trial. He assumed senior status on December 31, 2004. Matia's service ended on May 31, 2005, due to retirement. Matia later worked for the Porter Wright Morris & Arthur law firm in its Cleveland office, but has since retired.

== Sources ==
- Matia's profile at Porter Wright Morris & Arthur

Legal offices
Preceded by Seat established by 104 Stat. 5089	Judge of the United States District Court for the Northern District of Ohio; 1991–2004	Succeeded by Christopher A. Boyko
Preceded by George Washington White	Chief Judge of the United States District Court for the Northern District of Ohio; 1999–2004	Succeeded by James G. Carr
