= George Washington White =

American judge

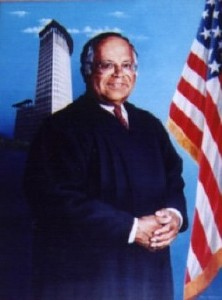
- Judicial portrait of George Washington White, 2002, by Gary Thomas.

Senior Judge of the United States District Court for the Northern District of Ohio
- In office February 26, 1999 – November 12, 2011

Chief Judge of the United States District Court for the Northern District of Ohio
- In office 1995–1999
- Preceded by: Thomas Demetrios Lambros
- Succeeded by: Paul Ramon Matia

Judge of the United States District Court for the Northern District of Ohio
- In office May 23, 1980 – February 26, 1999
- Appointed by: Jimmy Carter
- Preceded by: Seat established by 92 Stat. 1629
- Succeeded by: John R. Adams

Personal details
- Born: May 6, 1931 Duquesne, Pennsylvania, U.S.
- Died: November 12, 2011 (aged 80) Mayfield Heights, Ohio, U.S.
- Education: Cleveland State University (JD)

George Washington White (May 6, 1931 – November 12, 2011) was a United States district judge of the United States District Court for the Northern District of Ohio.

== Education and career ==
Born in Duquesne, Pennsylvania, White received a Juris Doctor from the Cleveland State University College of Law in 1955. He was in private practice in Cleveland, Ohio from 1956 to 1968. He was a Referee for the Court of Common Pleas in Cuyahoga County, Ohio from 1957 to 1962. He was a city councilman in Cleveland from 1963 to 1968. He was a judge of the Court of Common Pleas from 1968 to 1980.

== Federal judicial service ==
White was nominated by President Jimmy Carter on March 28, 1980, to the United States District Court for the Northern District of Ohio, to a new seat created by 92 Stat. 1629. He was confirmed by the United States Senate on May 21, 1980, and received his commission on May 23, 1980. He served as Chief Judge from 1995 to 1999. He assumed senior status on February 26, 1999. White died on November 12, 2011, in Mayfield Heights, Ohio.

== See also ==
- List of African-American federal judges
- List of African-American jurists

== Sources ==
Legal offices
Preceded by Seat established by 92 Stat. 1629	Judge of the United States District Court for the Northern District of Ohio; 1980–1999	Succeeded by John R. Adams
Preceded by Thomas Demetrios Lambros	Chief Judge of the United States District Court for the Northern District of Ohio; 1995–1999	Succeeded by Paul Ramon Matia
