= Thomas Demetrios Lambros =

American judge (1930–2019)

Chief Judge of the United States District Court for the Northern District of Ohio
- In office 1990–1995
- Preceded by: Frank J. Battisti
- Succeeded by: George Washington White

Judge of the United States District Court for the Northern District of Ohio
- In office August 18, 1967 – February 10, 1995
- Appointed by: Lyndon B. Johnson
- Preceded by: Seat established by 80 Stat. 75
- Succeeded by: Donald C. Nugent

Personal details
- Born: Thomas Demetrios Lambros; February 4, 1930 Ashtabula, Ohio, U.S.
- Died: December 3, 2019 (aged 89) Jensen Beach, Florida, U.S.
- Education: Cleveland State University (LLB)

Thomas Demetrios Lambros (February 4, 1930 – December 3, 2019) was a United States district judge of the United States District Court for the Northern District of Ohio.

== Education and career ==
Lambros was born in Ashtabula, Ohio and attended Ashtabula High School. He received a Bachelor of Laws from Cleveland State University College of Law in 1952. He was a Claims Representative for the Buckeye Union Casualty Company in Akron, Ohio from 1952 to 1953. He was in the United States Army as a law clerk in the Judge Advocate General's Corps from 1954 to 1956 and became a staff sergeant. He was in private practice of law in Ashtabula from 1956 to 1961. He was a judge of the Ohio Court of Common Pleas from 1961 to 1967.

=== Federal judicial service ===
Lambros was nominated by President Lyndon B. Johnson on June 5, 1967, to the United States District Court for the Northern District of Ohio, to a new seat created by 80 Stat. 75. He was confirmed by the United States Senate on August 18, 1967, and received his commission the same day. He served as Chief Judge from 1990 to 1995, becoming both the first Greek American federal judge and first Greek American Chief Judge of a federal court. His service was terminated on February 10, 1995, due to his retirement.

== Post judicial service and death ==
After his retirement from the federal bench, Lambros engaged in the private practice of law with the firm of Janik LLP and was active until his death. Lambros died unexpectedly on December 3, 2019, in Jensen Beach, Florida, after collapsing while walking.

== Honor ==
The Thomas D. Lambros Federal Building & United States Courthouse, built in Youngstown, Ohio in 1995, was named for Lambros in 1996.

== Sources ==
Legal offices
Preceded by Seat established by 80 Stat. 75	Judge of the United States District Court for the Northern District of Ohio; 1967–1995	Succeeded by Donald C. Nugent
Preceded by Frank J. Battisti	Chief Judge of the United States District Court for the Northern District of Ohio; 1990–1995	Succeeded by George Washington White
