= University of Akron School of Law =

University law school in Ohio, US

Coordinates: 41.077°N 81.516°W

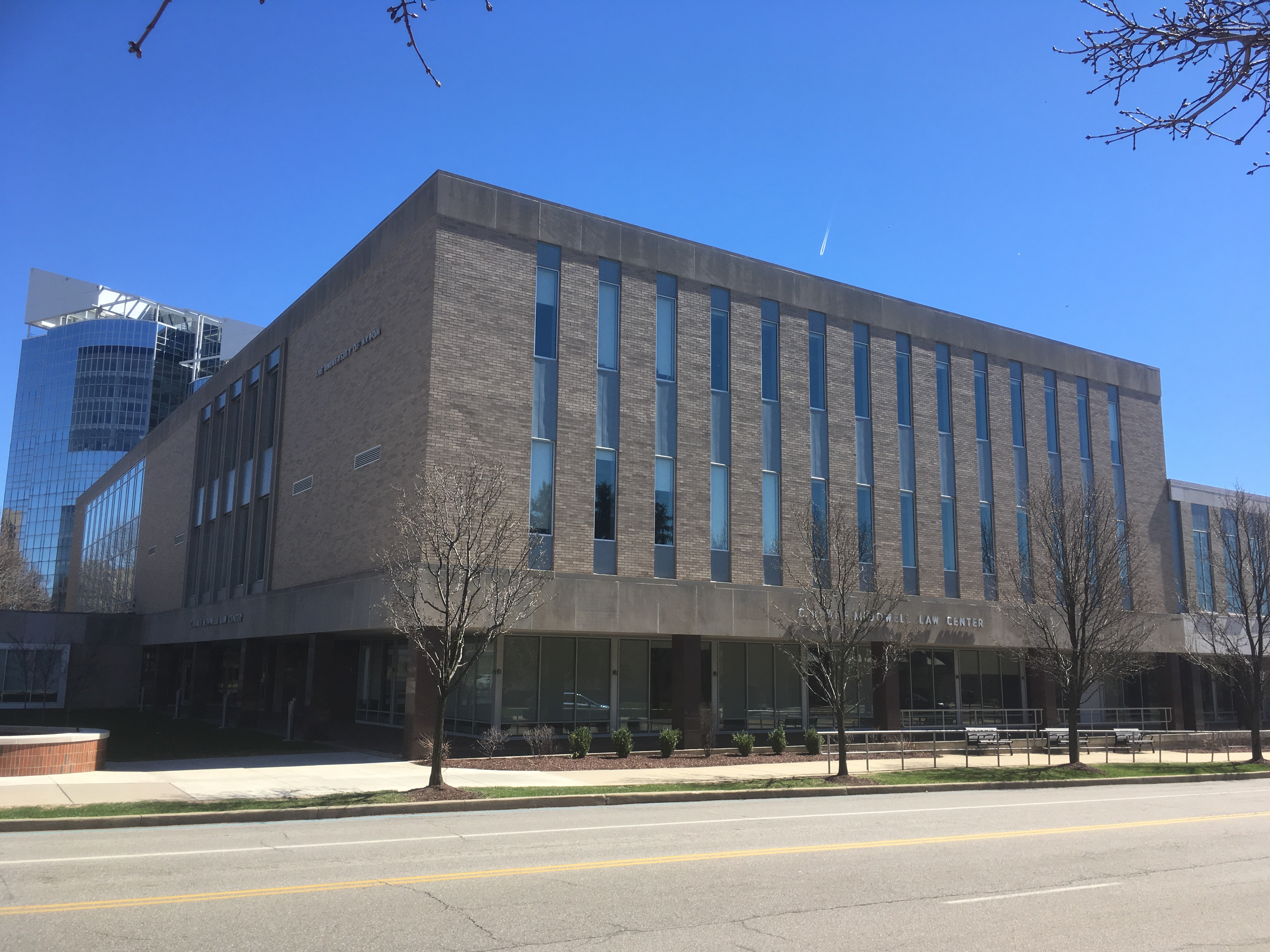
- Motto: Fiat Lux (Latin for Let there be light)
- Established: 1921
- School type: Public
- Parent endowment: $133.3 million
- Dean: Emily M. Janoski-Haehlen
- Location: Akron, Ohio, U.S.
- Enrollment: 526
- Faculty: 52
- USNWR ranking: 127th (2025)
- Bar pass rate: 89.4% in Ohio
- Website: www.uakron.edu/law/

The University of Akron School of Law is the law school at the University of Akron in Akron, Ohio. Offering both Juris Doctor and Master of Laws degrees, it was founded in 1921 as the Akron School of Law and merged with the University of Akron in 1959, becoming fully accredited by the American Bar Association in 1961. Since 1921, the school has produced over 6,000 graduates.

Located across from E. J. Thomas Hall on University Avenue, the University of Akron School of Law is housed in the C. Blake McDowell Law Center on the northwest portion of the University of Akron campus. It also houses the Joseph G. Miller and William C. Becker Institute for Professional Responsibility and The University of Akron Center for Constitutional Law, one of only four constitutional law centers established by Congress in the United States.

== Curriculum ==
The University of Akron School of Law admits traditional three year J.D. students, part-time J.D. students, and also students for the LL.M. Within the J.D. program, Akron Law students can also choose to specialize in one of eight areas of law, which include business, criminal, intellectual property, international, labor and employment, litigation, public law, and tax law.

=== Intellectual property program ===
The school's program in intellectual property, managed by The Center for Intellectual Property Law and Technology, is of note as it is one of two programs to offer the LL.M. in intellectual property in Ohio, and is one of 22 such programs in the United States. A study conducted by IDEA – The Intellectual Property Law Review in 2005, ranks Akron's IP program curricular offerings as tied for fifth in the nation. The law school also publishes the Akron Intellectual Property Journal which is a "scholarly legal publication of The University of Akron C. Blake McDowell Law Center that produces an annual volume of two issues for use by scholars, practitioners, and judges." The Akron Intellectual Property Journal is part of the Akron Law Review, which in 2010, was ranked #39 out of over 200 ABA-accredited and major foreign general, student-edited journals on the Washington and Lee impact rankings (based in citations per issue). This is the fifth consecutive year the Akron Law Review was in the top 50. Each Spring, The University of Akron School of Law hosts the Richard C. Sughrue Symposium On Intellectual Property Law and Policy, featuring many known scholars and practitioners within the field of Intellectual Property. Known past speakers include Robert Stoll, Commissioner for Patents at the USPTO and Chief Judge Paul R. Michel.

=== Honors to Law program ===
The University of Akron School of Law has a program for undergraduate Honors students at the University of Akron to receive undergraduate admission to the law school. In order to stay in the program students must maintain a 3.4 GPA and score at or above the anticipated median LSAT score of the next class of entering full-time law students.

== Rankings and admissions ==
In its 2015 rankings, Above The Law ranked The University of Akron School of Law at No. 50 in the country. In 2015, U.S. News & World Report listed Akron's full-time Juris Doctor program as 127th and its part-time Juris Doctor program at 47th in the nation, while in 2021, Akron dropped to 134th and 52nd, respectively. In 2019, the school had an acceptance rate of 49.85%. Among first year students, the 75th, 50th and 25th percentile undergraduate GPAs were 3.67, 3.45 and 3.05 respectively; and the LSAT percentiles were 155, 153 and 151 respectively.

== Employment ==
Of the class of 2013, 89.2% found employment nine months after graduation. 59% of the class of 2013 found employment for which a JD is required nine months after graduation. In addition, over 15% of the class of 2013 found JD-preferred positions. 13.3% of the class of 2013 found other professional positions. 87.3% of the class of 2013 was employed in either a JD-required, JD-preferred, or other professional position nine months after graduation.

ABA Employment Summary for 2013 Graduates
Employment Status	Percentage
Employed - Bar Passage Required	59.03%
Employed - J.D. Advantage	15.06%
Employed - Professional Position	13.25%
Employed - Non-Professional Position	1.8%
Employed - Undeterminable	0.0%
Pursuing Graduate Degree Full Time	0.6%
Unemployed - Start Date Deferred	0.6%
Unemployed - Not Seeking	1.2%
Unemployed - Seeking	4.82%
Employment Status Unknown	3.61%
Total of 166 Graduates

== Publications ==
The University of Akron School of Law publishes:

- Akron Intellectual Property Journal
- Akron Law Review
- Akron Tax Journal

== Costs ==
The total cost of tuition at The University of Akron for the 2014-2015 academic year is $24,440 for non-residents and $24,340 for residents of Ohio.

== Alumni ==
After graduating from Kent State University, Ohio congresswoman Betty Sutton received her J.D. from Akron law. In 2006, she defeated Craig L. Foltin for Ohio's 13th congressional district and was successfully re-elected in 2008. In the 110th Congress, Sutton was a member of the United States House Committee on the Judiciary, and in the 111th Congress, Sutton was a member of the United States House Committee on Energy and Commerce.

The former mayor of Akron, Ohio, Don Plusquellic, received his J.D. from Akron law and was a private practice attorney at the time of his election in 1987.

Alice M. Batchelder received her J.D. from Akron in 1971 and is the longest current serving federal judge on the United States Court of Appeals for the Sixth Circuit, having been appointed by George H. W. Bush in 1991.

Deborah L. Cook received her J.D. from Akron in 1978. Having previously served as a justice for the Supreme Court of Ohio from 1995 to 2003, she was appointed by George W. Bush in 2003 to serve on the Sixth Circuit alongside Batchelder. They were both touted by the media as possible nominations of George W. Bush for the Supreme Court, and Cook was seen as a possible McCain appointment, had he been elected President.

Among the school's graduates who have gone on to be United States district court judges are James S. Gwin, Peter C. Economus, Sam H. Bell, and John R. Adams.

Lynne M. Tracy, who earned her J.D. in 1994, became an American diplomat and in February 2019 was sworn in as U.S. Ambassador to Armenia.
