= United States District Court for the Northern District of Ohio =

United States federal district court in Ohio

Coordinates: 41°29′47.1″N 81°41′50.4″W

- (N.D. Ohio)
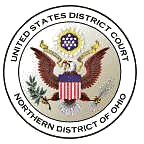

- Location: Carl B. Stokes U.S. Courthouse (Cleveland) More locations: John F. Seiberling Federal Building and U.S. Courthouse (Akron); James M. Ashley and Thomas W.L. Ashley U.S. Courthouse (Toledo); Thomas D. Lambros Federal Building and U.S. Courthouse (Youngstown)
- Appeals to: Sixth Circuit
- Established: February 10, 1855
- Judges: 11
- Chief Judge: Sara Elizabeth Lioi

Officers of the court
- U.S. Attorney: David M. Toepfer
- U.S. Marshal: Peter Elliott
- www.ohnd.uscourts.gov

The U.S. District Court for the Northern District of Ohio (in case citations, N.D. Ohio) is the federal trial court for the northern half of Ohio. The district holds court in Cleveland, Akron, Toledo, and Youngstown. The district includes 40 of the state's 88 counties.

Appeals from this court are heard by the United States Court of Appeals for the Sixth Circuit (except for patent claims and claims against the U.S. government under the Tucker Act, which are appealed to the Federal Circuit). The United States Attorney's Office of the Northern District of Ohio represents the United States in civil and criminal litigation in the court. The United States Attorney, the district's chief prosecutor, is David M. Toepfer.

== History ==
The United States District Court for the District of Ohio was established on February 19, 1803, by 2 Stat. 201. The District was subdivided into Northern and Southern Districts on February 10, 1855, by 10 Stat. 604.

== Divisions ==
The Northern District comprises two divisions.

=== Eastern Division ===
The Eastern Division comprises the counties of Ashland, Ashtabula, Carroll, Columbiana, Crawford, Cuyahoga, Geauga, Holmes, Lake, Lorain, Mahoning, Medina, Portage, Richland, Stark, Summit, Trumbull, Tuscarawas and Wayne.

Court for the Eastern Division can be held in Akron, Cleveland and Youngstown.

=== Western Division ===
The Western Division comprises the counties of Allen, Auglaize, Defiance, Erie, Fulton, Hancock, Hardin, Henry, Huron, Lucas, Marion, Mercer, Ottawa, Paulding, Putnam, Sandusky, Seneca, Van Wert, Williams, Wood and Wyandot.

Court for the Western Division can be held in Toledo.

== Current judges ==
As of July 9, 2026:

#	Title	Judge	Duty station	Born	Term of service			Appointed by
#	Title	Judge	Duty station	Born	Active	Chief	Senior	Appointed by
52	Chief Judge	Sara Elizabeth Lioi	Akron	1960	2007–present	2023–present	—	G.W. Bush
49	District Judge	John R. Adams	Akron	1955	2003–present	—	—	G.W. Bush
53	District Judge	Benita Y. Pearson	Youngstown	1963	2010–present	—	—	Obama
54	District Judge	Jeffrey J. Helmick	Toledo	1960	2012–present	—	—	Obama
55	District Judge	Pamela Barker	Cleveland	1957	2019–present	—	—	Trump
56	District Judge	James R. Knepp II	Toledo	1964	2020–present	—	—	Trump
57	District Judge	J. Philip Calabrese	Cleveland	1971	2020–present	—	—	Trump
58	District Judge	Charles E. Fleming	Cleveland	1962	2022–present (Note: Despite identical commission dates, Judges Fleming, Ruiz and Brennan are organized chronologically by virtue of seniority of age.)	—	—	Biden
59	District Judge	David A. Ruiz	Cleveland	1973	2022–present	—	—	Biden
60	District Judge	Bridget M. Brennan	Cleveland	1974	2022–present	—	—	Biden
61	District Judge	Michael Hendershot	Cleveland	1974	2026–present	—	—	Trump
40	Senior Judge	James G. Carr	inactive	1940	1994–2010	2004–2010	2010–present	Clinton
41	Senior Judge	Solomon Oliver Jr.	Cleveland	1947	1994–2021	2010–2017	2021–present	Clinton
44	Senior Judge	Peter C. Economus	inactive	1943	1995–2009	—	2009–present	Clinton
45	Senior Judge	Donald C. Nugent	Cleveland	1948	1995–2017	—	2017–present	Clinton
46	Senior Judge	Patricia Anne Gaughan	Cleveland	1953	1995–2023	2017–2023	2023–present	Clinton
47	Senior Judge	James S. Gwin	inactive	1954	1997–2021	—	2021–present	Clinton
48	Senior Judge	Dan Polster	Cleveland	1951	1998–2021	—	2021–present	Clinton
50	Senior Judge	Christopher A. Boyko	Cleveland	1954	2005–2020	—	2020–present	G.W. Bush
51	Senior Judge	Jack Zouhary	Toledo	1951	2006–2019	—	2019–present	G.W. Bush

== Former judges ==
#	Judge	Born–died	Active service	Chief Judge	Senior status	Appointed by	Reason for termination
1	Hiram V. Willson	1808–1866	1855–1866	—	—	Pierce	death
2	Charles Taylor Sherman	1811–1879	1867–1872	—	—	A. Johnson	resignation
3	Martin Welker	1819–1902	1873–1889 (Note: Recess appointment; formally nominated on December 2, 1873, confirmed by the United States Senate on December 8, 1873, and received commission the same day.)	—	—	Grant	retirement
4	Augustus J. Ricks	1843–1906	1889–1906 (Note: Recess appointment; formally nominated on December 16, 1889, confirmed by the United States Senate on January 16, 1890, and received commission the same day.)	—	—	B. Harrison	death
5	Francis Joseph Wing	1850–1918	1901–1905	—	—	McKinley	resignation
6	Robert Walker Tayler	1852–1910	1905–1910	—	—	T. Roosevelt	death
7	John Milton Killits	1858–1938	1910–1928	—	1928–1938	Taft	death
8	William Louis Day	1876–1936	1911–1914	—	—	Taft	resignation
9	John Hessin Clarke	1857–1945	1914–1916	—	—	Wilson	elevation
10	David C. Westenhaver	1865–1928	1917–1928	—	—	Wilson	death
11	Paul Jones	1880–1965	1923–1965	1948–1959	—	Harding	death
12	Samuel H. West	1872–1938	1928–1938	—	—	Coolidge	death
13	George Philip Hahn	1879–1937	1928–1937	—	—	Coolidge	death
14	Frank Le Blond Kloeb	1890–1976	1937–1964	1959–1960	1964–1976	F. Roosevelt	death
15	Robert Nugen Wilkin	1886–1973	1939–1949	—	1949–1973	F. Roosevelt	death
16	Emerich B. Freed	1897–1955	1941–1955	—	—	F. Roosevelt	death
17	Charles Joseph McNamee	1890–1964	1951–1964	1960	—	Truman	death
18	James C. Connell	1897–1973	1954–1971	1960–1967	1971–1973	Eisenhower	death
19	Paul Charles Weick	1899–1997	1956–1959	—	—	Eisenhower	elevation
20	Girard Edward Kalbfleisch	1899–1990	1959–1970	1967–1969	1970–1990	Eisenhower	death
21	Frank J. Battisti	1922–1994	1961–1994	1969–1990	1994–1994	Kennedy	death
22	Ben Charles Green	1905–1983	1961–1976 (Note: Recess appointment; formally nominated on January 15, 1962, confirmed by the United States Senate on June 29, 1962, and received commission on July 2, 1962.)	—	1976–1983	Kennedy	death
23	Don John Young	1910–1996	1965–1980	—	1980–1996	L. Johnson	death
24	William Kernahan Thomas	1911–2001	1966–1981	—	1981–2001	L. Johnson	death
25	Thomas Demetrios Lambros	1930–2019	1967–1995	1990–1995	—	L. Johnson	retirement
26	Robert B. Krupansky	1921–2004	1970–1982	—	—	Nixon	elevation
27	Nicholas Joseph Walinski Jr.	1920–1992	1970–1985	—	1985–1992	Nixon	death
28	Leroy John Contie Jr.	1920–2001	1971–1982	—	—	Nixon	elevation
29	John Michael Manos	1922–2006	1976–1991	—	1991–2006	Ford	death
30	George Washington White	1931–2011	1980–1999	1995–1999	1999–2011	Carter	death
31	Ann Aldrich	1927–2010	1980–1995	—	1995–2010	Carter	death
32	Alvin Krenzler	1921–2010	1981–1992	—	1992–1992	Reagan	retirement
33	John William Potter	1918–2013	1982–1992	—	1992–2013	Reagan	death
34	David Dudley Dowd Jr.	1929–2016	1982–1996	—	1996–2016	Reagan	death
35	Sam H. Bell	1925–2010	1982–1996	—	1996–2010	Reagan	death
36	Alice M. Batchelder	1944–present	1985–1992	—	—	Reagan	elevation
37	Richard B. McQuade Jr.	1940–present	1986–1989	—	—	Reagan	resignation
38	Paul Ramon Matia	1937–present	1991–2004	1999–2004	2004–2005	G.H.W. Bush	retirement
39	Lesley B. Wells	1937–2025	1994–2006	—	2006–2015	Clinton	retirement
42	David A. Katz	1933–2016	1994–2005	—	2005–2016	Clinton	death
43	Kathleen M. O'Malley	1956–present	1994–2010	—	—	Clinton	elevation

== Chief judges ==
Chief judges have administrative responsibilities with respect to their district court. Unlike the Supreme Court, where one justice is specifically nominated to be chief, the office of chief judge rotates among the district court judges. To be chief, a judge must have been in active service on the court for at least one year, be under the age of 65, and have not previously served as chief judge.

A vacancy is filled by the judge highest in seniority among the group of qualified judges. The chief judge serves for a term of seven years, or until age 70, whichever occurs first. The age restrictions are waived if no members of the court would otherwise be qualified for the position.

When the office was created in 1948, the chief judge was the longest-serving judge who had not elected to retire, on what has since 1958 been known as senior status, or declined to serve as chief judge. After August 6, 1959, judges could not become or remain chief after turning 70 years old. The current rules have been in operation since October 1, 1982.

== Succession of seats ==
Seat 1
Seat established on February 10, 1855 by 10 Stat. 604
Willson	1855–1866
Sherman	1867–1872
Welker	1873–1889
Ricks	1890–1906
Seat abolished on December 22, 1906 (temporary judgeship expired)

Seat 2
Seat established on December 19, 1900 by 31 Stat. 726 (temporary)
Wing	1901–1905
Seat became permanent upon the abolition of Seat 1 on December 22, 1906
Tayler	1905–1910
Day	1911–1914
Clarke	1914–1916
Westenhaver	1917–1928
West	1928–1938
Wilkin	1939–1949
McNamee	1951–1964
Seat abolished on May 2, 1964 (temporary judgeship expired)

Seat 3
Seat established on February 24, 1910 by 36 Stat. 202
Killits	1910–1928
Hahn	1928–1937
Kloeb	1937–1964
Young	1965–1980
Krenzler	1981–1992
Katz	1994–2005
Zouhary	2006–2019
Knepp II	2020–present

Seat 4
Seat established on September 14, 1922 by 42 Stat. 837 (temporary)
Seat made permanent on August 19, 1935 by 49 Stat. 659
Jones	1923–1965
Thomas	1966–1981
Potter	1982–1992
O'Malley	1994–2010
Seat abolished on December 27, 2010 (temporary judgeship expired)

Seat 5
Seat established on May 1, 1941 by 55 Stat. 148 (temporary)
Seat made permanent on August 3, 1949 by 63 Stat. 493
Freed	1941–1955
Weick	1956–1959
Kalbfleisch	1959–1970
Walinski, Jr.	1970–1985
McQuade, Jr.	1986–1989
Carr	1994–2010
Helmick	2012–present

Seat 6
Seat established on February 10, 1954 by 68 Stat. 8
Connell	1954–1971
Contie, Jr.	1971–1982
Dowd, Jr.	1982–1996
Polster	1998–2021
Brennan	2022–present

Seat 7
Seat established on May 19, 1961 by 75 Stat. 80
Battisti	1961–1994
Economus	1995–2009
Pearson	2010–present

Seat 8
Seat established on May 19, 1961 by 75 Stat. 80 (temporary)
Seat became permanent upon the abolition of Seat 2 on May 2, 1964
Green	1962–1976
Manos	1976–1991
Wells	1994–2006
Lioi	2007–present

Seat 9
Seat established on May 18, 1966 by 80 Stat. 75
Lambros	1967–1995
Nugent	1995–2017
Barker	2019–present

Seat 10
Seat established on June 2, 1970 by 84 Stat. 294
Krupansky	1970–1982
Bell	1982–1996
Gwin	1997–2021
Fleming	2022–present

Seat 11
Seat established on October 20, 1978 by 92 Stat. 1629
White	1980–1999
Adams	2003–present

Seat 12
Seat established on October 20, 1978 by 92 Stat. 1629 (temporary)
Seat made permanent on July 10, 1984 by 98 Stat. 347
Aldrich	1980–1995
Gaughan	1995–2023
Hendershot	2026–present

Seat 13
Seat established on July 10, 1984 by 98 Stat. 347 (temporary)
Seat made permanent on December 1, 1990 by 104 Stat. 5089
Batchelder	1985–1992
Oliver, Jr.	1994–2021
Ruiz	2022–present

Seat 14
Seat established on December 1, 1990 by 104 Stat. 5089 (temporary)
Matia	1991–2004
Seat became permanent upon the abolition of Seat 4 on December 27, 2010
Boyko	2005–2020
Calabrese	2020–present

== See also ==
- Courts of Ohio
- List of current United States district judges
- List of United States federal courthouses in Ohio
