= Cleveland State University College of Law =

Law school in Cleveland, Ohio, United States

Coordinates: 41.50193°N 81.67851°W

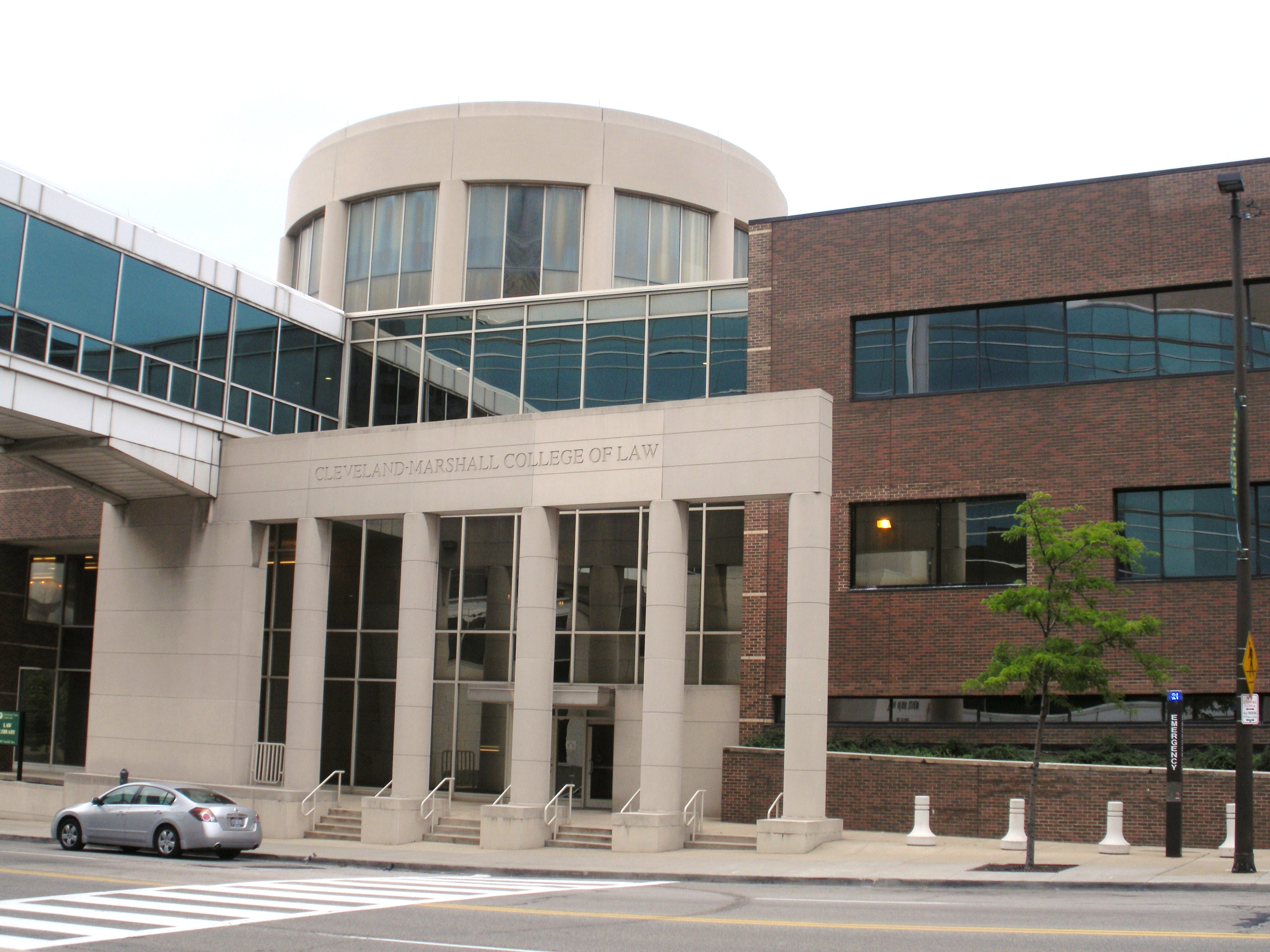
- Parent school: Cleveland State University
- Established: 1897; 129 years ago
- School type: Public law school
- Dean: Lee Fisher
- Location: Cleveland, Ohio, U.S.
- Enrollment: 440
- Faculty: 75
- USNWR ranking: 121st (tie) (2025)
- Website: www.law.csuohio.edu

Cleveland State University College of Law is the law school of Cleveland State University, a public research university in Cleveland, Ohio. It traces its origins to Cleveland Law School, founded in 1897, which merged in 1946 with the John Marshall School of Law to become Cleveland–Marshall Law School and was absorbed by the university in 1969. It is accredited by the American Bar Association and is a member of the Association of American Law Schools.

== History ==
Cleveland Law School, founded in 1897, was Ohio's first evening law school and also the first to admit women. John Marshall School of Law was established by Cleveland attorneys, and classes began in 1916 in the New Guardian Building on Euclid Avenue. Following an affiliation with Ohio Northern University (1917–1923), Marshall received authorization to confer degrees under its own name.

In 1946, the two Cleveland schools merged to form Cleveland-Marshall Law School. From 1963 to 1967, C-M maintained a nominal relationship with Baldwin–Wallace College. After regaining independent status, Cleveland-Marshall began its full-time legal education program. C-M became a state institution affiliated with Cleveland State University in 1969, becoming the Cleveland–Marshall College of Law, the largest law college in Ohio at the time. It was renamed to the Cleveland State University College of Law in 2022 due to namesake John Marshall's history of owning slaves.

CSU Law has a rich history of integrating women and minorities into the American legal field, including Carl Stokes, the first African-American mayor of a major city in the U.S., Mary Grossman, the first woman in Ohio elected to a Municipal Court Bench as well as one of the first female members of the American Bar Association, Genevieve Cline, the first woman appointed to the U.S. federal bench, and Lillian Walker Burke, the first African-American female judge in Ohio. Louis Stokes, older brother of Carl and Ohio's first elected African American to the House of Representatives. Louis Stokes also argued the landmark United States Supreme Court case of Terry v. Ohio first in the Cuyahoga County Court of Common Pleas, then the United States Supreme Court. Moreover, because Thurgood Marshall began his tenure on the United States Supreme Court on October 2, 1967, and Terry v. Ohio was argued on December 12, 1967, Louis Stokes' oral arguments likely represented the first time in American history that an African American Supreme Court Justice heard oral arguments from an African American litigator.

== Academics ==
In addition to the Juris Doctor (J.D.), the Master of Legal Studies (M.L.S.), and the Master of Laws (L.L.M.) degrees, Cleveland-Marshall also offers dual degrees, which include a J.D./M.B.A. (Master of Business Administration), a J.D./M.P.A. (Master of Public Administration), a J.D./M.U.P.D.D. (Master of Urban Planning, Design and Development), a J.D./M.A.E.S. (Master of Arts in Environmental Studies), and a J.D./M.S.E.S. (Master of Science in Environmental Science) degree program.

=== Rankings ===
In 2016, U.S. News & World Report ranked Cleveland-Marshall's full-time J.D. program at 106. In 2014, Cleveland-Marshall was ranked 115th (out of 203); its part-time Juris Doctor program was ranked 56th in the nation. Cleveland-Marshall was previously ranked 119th in 2013 and 135th in 2012.

According to the law professor blog The Faculty Lounge, based on 2012 ABA data, only 48.9 percent of graduates obtained full-time, long term, bar admission required positions nine months after graduation, ranking 137th out of 197 law schools.

According to Cleveland–Marshall College of Law's official 2013 ABA-required disclosures, 44.7 percent of the Class of 2013 obtained full-time, long-term, bar passage-required employment nine months after graduation, excluding solo-practitioners. 83.6 percent of the Class of 2013 was employed in some capacity while 15.1 percent were unemployed nine months after graduation.

Ohio was the main employment destination for 2013 Cleveland–Marshall College of Law graduates, with 87.2 percent of employed 2013 graduates working in the state.

== Law library ==
The law library is a selective depository library as part of the Federal Depository Library Program under the Depository Library Act of 1962. In addition to the standard legal reference works, its collections include substantial coverage of constitutional law, employment and labor law, Jewish law, Islamic law, law careers, legal research and writing, Ohio law and practice, and urban law.

The library also houses the materials from the Cuyahoga County Prosecutor's office relating to the prosecution of Sam Sheppard in the 1954 Marilyn Sheppard murder case. The collection comprises over 60 boxes of photographs, recordings, documents, and trial exhibits. The law school has cataloged and digitized the materials, many of which are available online.

== Notable alumni ==
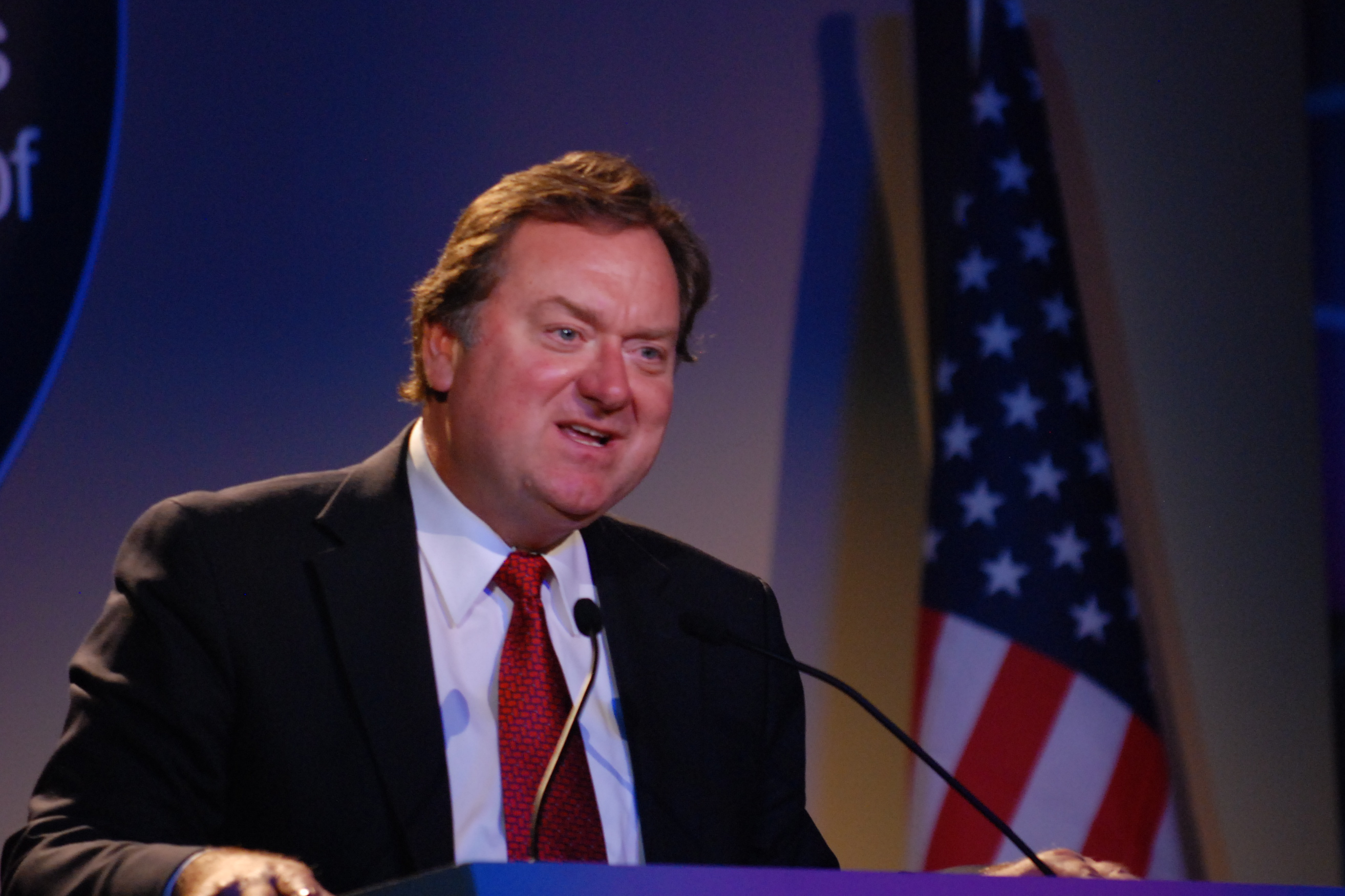
Tim Russert

Many notable judges, politicians, and business leaders have graduated from CSU Law. Tim Russert graduated from Cleveland-Marshall in 1976 and became a television journalist and lawyer who appeared for more than 16 years as the longest-serving moderator of NBC's Meet the Press. Carl Stokes, the first African-American mayor of a major U.S. city, graduated from Cleveland-Marshall in 1956 and was admitted to the Ohio bar in 1957. Frank G. Jackson, a former mayor of Cleveland, is also a graduate. Current United States Secretary of Housing and Urban Development, Marcia Fudge, graduated in 1983 and became the first alum to serve in a president's cabinet. Alan Miles Ruben, the Editor-in-Chief of the standard treatise "How Arbitration Works" who serves as Professor Emeritus Cleveland-Marshall College of Law and formerly served as Professor (1970 to 2003) earned a Guggenheim Fellowship and was a Fulbright Scholar (1993) and Advisory Professor of Law Fudan University in Shanghai, China who became Member of Greater Cleveland Sports Hall of Fame with Bob Feller (Class of 1976) as he captained both the U.S. team at 1972 Olympics and 1971 Pan-American games. Professor Ruben also made $500,000 commitment to create the Alan Miles Ruben and Betty Willis Ruben Endowed Professorship at the then-Cleveland–Marshall College of Law.
