= Ohio Courts of Common Pleas =

Trial courts of the state court system of Ohio

The Ohio Courts of Common Pleas are the trial courts of the state court system of Ohio.

The courts of common pleas are the trial courts of general jurisdiction in the state. They are the only trial courts created by the Ohio Constitution (in Article IV, Section 1). The duties of the courts are outlined in Article IV, Section 4. Each of Ohio's 88 counties has a court of common pleas. The Ohio General Assembly (the state legislature) has the power to divide courts of common pleas into divisions, and has done so, establishing general, domestic relations, juvenile, and probate divisions:

- General divisions have original jurisdiction in all criminal felony cases, all civil cases in which the amount in controversy is more than $15,000, and all cases involving title to real estate, excepting eviction matters. General divisions also have appellate jurisdiction over the decisions of some state administrative agencies and of city agencies. Some Ohio Courts of Common Pleas have specialized business court tracks, per authorization of the Supreme Court (Rule 49.01), called Commercial Dockets, including Cuyahoga County, Hamilton County, and Lucas County (Rule 5.08).
- Domestic relations divisions have jurisdiction over proceedings involving divorce (dissolution of marriage), annulment, legal separation, spousal support, parental rights, children, etc.
- Juvenile divisions hear cases involving juvenile delinquency (minors under 18 years of age charged with acts that would be crimes if committed by an adult) as well as cases involving unruly, dependent and neglected children. Juvenile courts have jurisdiction in adult cases involving paternity, child abuse, non-payment of child support, contributing to the delinquency of minors, and the failure to send children to school (truancy).
- Probate divisions – Formerly probate was handled by separate probate courts under Ohio Constitution of 1851, which had original jurisdiction over the probate of wills, supervision of the administration of estates, and guardianship. In 1968, the Modern Courts Amendment to the Ohio Constitution was adopted, establishing probate divisions of the courts of common pleas instead. Probate courts additionally have jurisdiction over the issuance of marriage licenses, adoption proceedings, determination of sanity or mental competency and certain eminent domain proceedings. Probate judges may also act as marriage officiants and charge a fee for the service.

Judges of the court of common pleas are elected to six-year terms on a nonpartisan ballot, although candidates may choose to run in partisan primary elections. In order to be appointed or elected to the court, a person must be an attorney with at least six years of experience in the practice of law.
