= List of University of Akron people =

The list of University of Akron people includes notable alumni and faculty of the University of Akron. Class year usually indicates year of graduation, unless an entry is denoted by an asterisk (*). In this case, the student did not graduate from the university, and the class year indicates the last known year a former student attended. In the case of alumni with multiple graduation years, the earliest graduation year is shown.

== Alumni ==
Selected UA Alumni

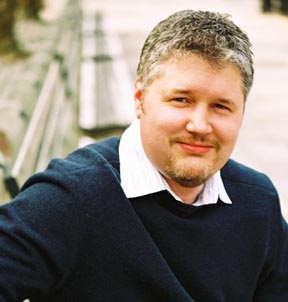
Michael Buckley

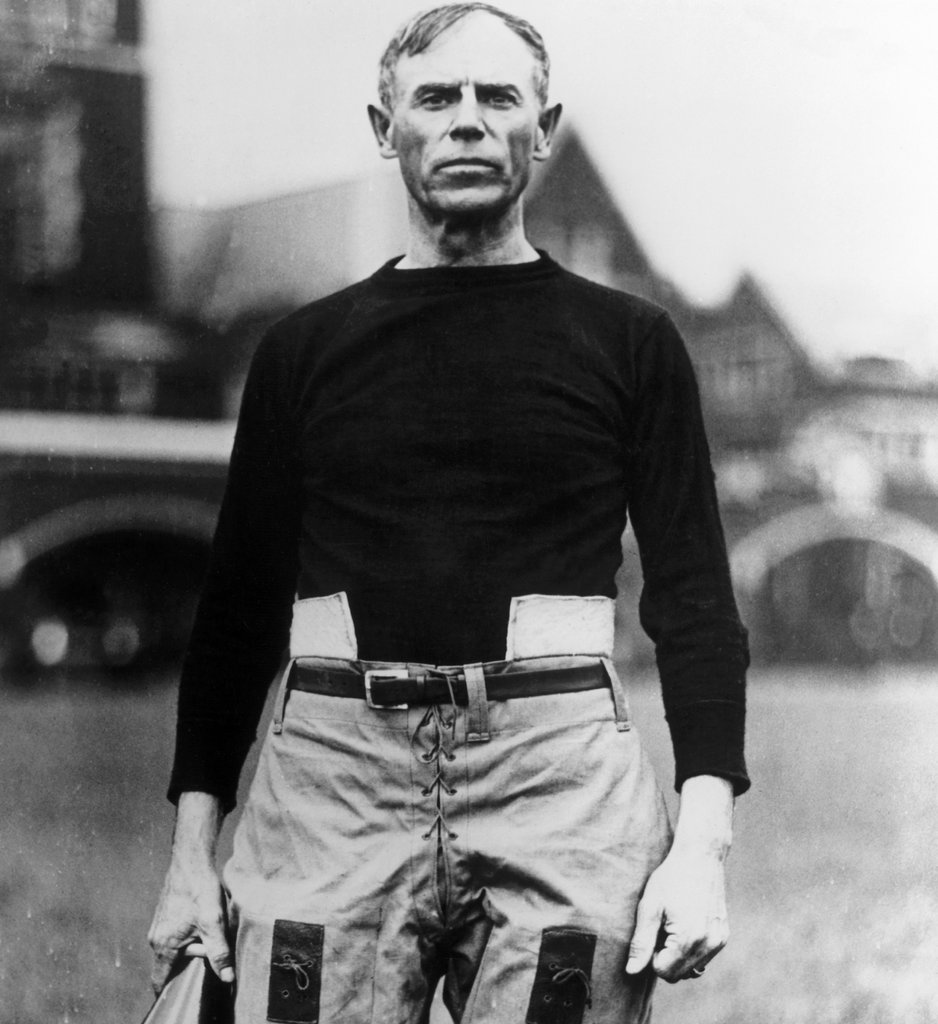
John Heisman

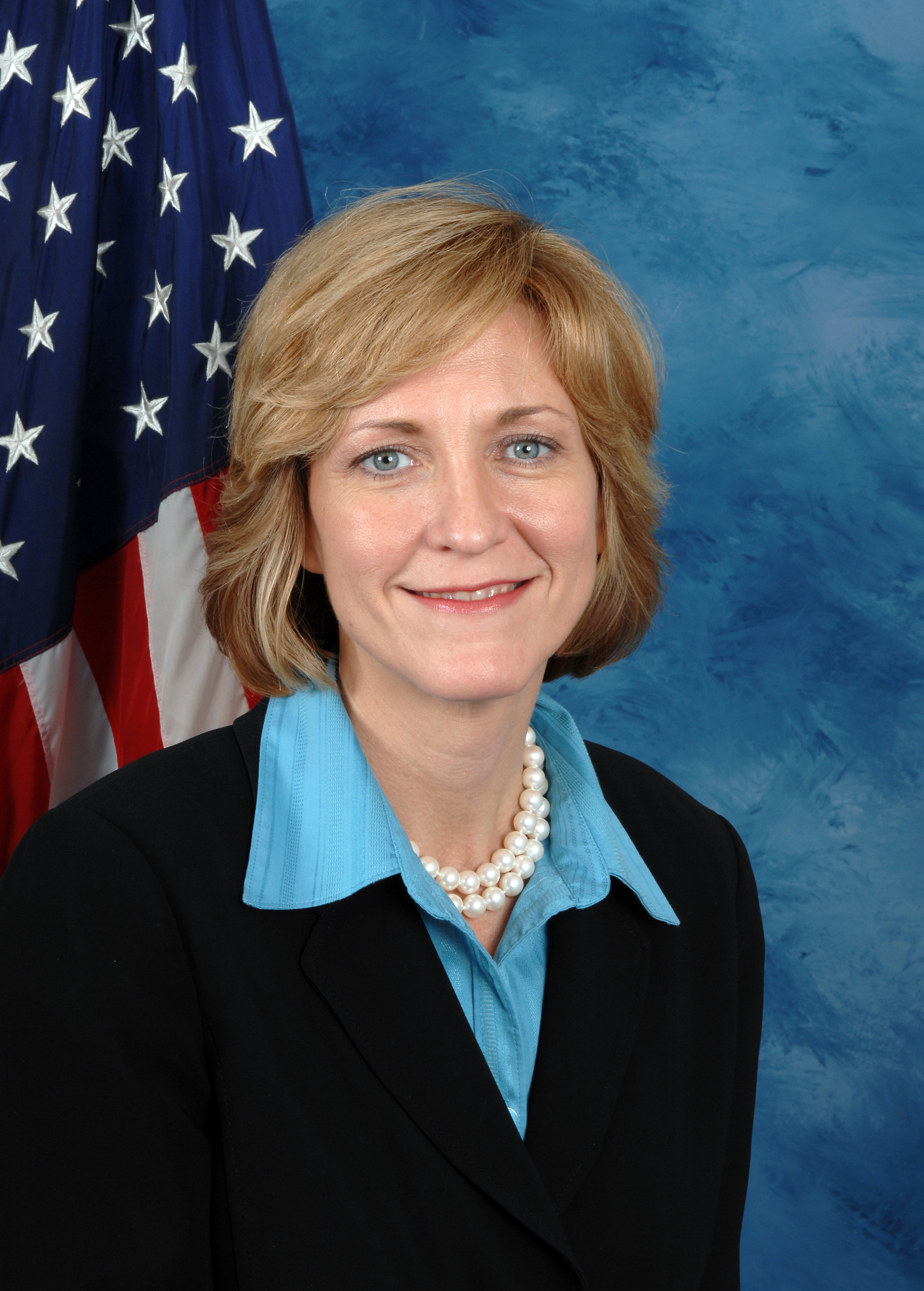
Betty Sutton

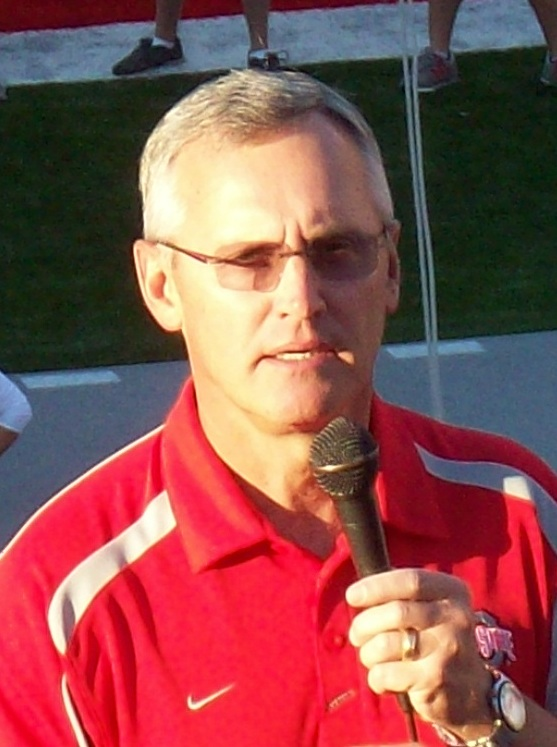
Jim Tressel

=== Athletics ===
Name	Class year	Notability	Reference(s)
Andy Alleman		NFL offensive guard (Miami Dolphins)	
Chris Bassitt		Major League Baseball pitcher (Oakland Athletics)	
Mike Birkbeck		Major League Baseball pitcher (Milwaukee Brewers and New York Mets)	
Chase Blackburn		NFL linebacker (New York Giants)	
Alexa Bliss		Wrestler	
John Bluem	1984 MA	NCAA soccer coach (Fresno State and Ohio State) and MLS broadcaster (Columbus Crew)	
E. J. Burt		AFL linebacker (Chicago Rush)	
Kwan Cheatham		Basketball player for Ironi Nes Ziona of the Israel Basketball Premier League	
Keith Dambrot	1982	College basketball coach	
China Krys Darrington		First sponsored female Freestyle BMX rider	
Tavian Dunn-Martin		CEBL point guard	
Eddie Elias		Professional Bowlers Association founder	
Jessica Eye	attended	Mixed martial artist competing in the UFC's bantamweight division	
Charlie Frye		NFL quarterback (Seattle Seahawks)	
Victor Green		NFL defensive back (New York Jets)	
Domenik Hixon		NFL wide receiver (New York Giants)	
Shawn Lemon		CFL and AFL player	
Louis A. Mackey	2000	NFL linebacker (Dallas Cowboys)	
Mark Malaska		Major League Baseball pitcher (Tampa Bay Devil Rays and Boston Red Sox)	
Roy Mlakar	1972	NHL team president and CEO (Ottawa Senators)	
Dominique Moceanu		Olympic gymnast	
Fritz Nagy		BBA player (Indianapolis Jets)	
Ara Parseghian		Head coach of Notre Dame	
Jarrod Pughsley		NFL offensive lineman	
Jake Schifino		NFL wide receiver (Tennessee Titans)	
Larry Shyatt	1975	Basketball coach	
Dwight Smith		NFL strong safety (Tampa Bay Buccaneers)	
Jason Taylor	1996	NFL defensive end (Miami Dolphins)	
Demetrius Treadwell		Basketball player for Hapoel Gilboa Galil of the Israeli League Liga Leumit	
Jim Tressel		College football head coach (Ohio State University)	
Bill Turner		NBA player (San Francisco Warriors)	
Siniša Ubiparipović		Major League Soccer player	
DeAndre Yedlin		Soccer player for Premier League club Newcastle United and the United States national team	

=== Politics and government ===
Name	Class year	Notability	Reference(s)
John R. Adams	1983	District court judge	
James E. Akins		Diplomat	
Alice M. Batchelder		Circuit judge	
Sam H. Bell	1952	District court judge	
Ray C. Bliss	1935	Former chair of the Republican National Committee	
Deborah L. Cook		Circuit judge	
Vernon Cook		State representative	
Phil Davison		Minerva councilman	
Peter C. Economus	1970	District court judge	
James S. Gwin	1979	District court judge	
Kermit L. Hall		Legal history scholar	
Princess Lindiwe		Member of the Cabinet of Eswatini and House of Assembly of Eswatini	
Michael Morell		Director of the Central Intelligence Agency	
Sandra Pianalto		Economist	
Don Plusquellic		Mayor of Akron, Ohio	
Thomas C. Sawyer		Mayor of Akron; congressman	
Betty Sutton		Congresswoman	
Mary Taylor		Ohio state auditor	
Kim Zurz		Politician	

=== Other ===
Name	Class year	Notability	Reference(s)
Dan Auerbach		Guitarist and vocalist (The Black Keys)	
George Brandes		Physicist and corporate leader	
David S. Brown		Historian and professor at Elizabethtown College	
Yvette Nicole Brown		Television and film actress from Drake and Josh and Community	
Michael Buckley		NY Times bestselling author of The Sisters Grimm series	
Patrick Carney		Drummer (The Black Keys)	
Alan H. Coogan	1977	Geologist specializing in applied sedimentary geology	
David Drabold	1983	Distinguished Professor of Physics at Ohio University	
Mary E. Gladwin	1887	Red Cross nurse in three wars	
Nick Kosir		"The Dancing Weatherman"; Fox Weather meteorologist	
Katherine Kurt	1880	Homeopath	
John E. Leland	1986	Director, University of Dayton Research Institute	
Paul T. Mikolashek	1969	U.S. Army lieutenant general	
Dan Moldea		Journalist	
Charles J. Pilliod, Jr.		CEO of Goodyear	
Nikola Resanovic		Composer	
Mark Scatterday		Conductor	
Robert P. Schumaker	2001	Creator of AZFinText, a news-aware high-frequency stock prediction system	
Joshua I. Smith		Businessman	
Irving C. Tomlinson	1880	Prominent Christian Scientist; secretary to Mary Baker Eddy	
Peter Wolf Toth		Sculptor	
George Wallace		Comedian	
Daniel Asua Wubah		President of Millersville University	

== Faculty and staff ==
=== Athletic coaches ===
Name	Department	Notability	Reference
Alex Adams	Men's basketball	Head coach (1976)	
Jim Aiken	Football	Head coach	
George Babcock	Football	Head coach	
Paul Baldacci	Football	Head coach	
Russell Beichly	Men's basketball	Head coach	
Paul Bixler	Men's basketball	Head coach	
Red Blair	Men's basketball; football	Head coach	
Dwight Bradley	Men's basketball; football	Head coach	
J. D. Brookhart	Football	Head coach	
Kenneth Cochrane	Football	Head coach	
James W. Coleman	Men's basketball; football	Head coach	
Frank Cook	Football	Head coach	
Coleman Crawford	Men's basketball	Head coach (1990–1995)	
Ken Cunningham	Men's basketball	Head coach	
Keith Dambrot	Men's basketball	Head coach (2004–present)	
Jim Dennison	Football	Head coach	
Otis Douglas	Football	Head coach	
Thomas Dowler	Men's basketball; football	Head coach	
Walter East	Men's basketball	Head coach	
Archie Eves	Football	Head coach	
Gerry Faust	Football	Head coach	
Forest Firestone	Football	Head coach	
Frank Haggerty	Men's basketball; football	Head coach	
John Heisman	Football	Head coach	
Dan Hipsher	Men's basketball	Head coach	
William Houghton	Football	Head coach	
Bob Huggins	Men's basketball	Head coach	
Pat Knight	Men's basketball	Assistant coach (2000–2001)	
Gordon K. Larson	Football	Head coach	
Tony Laterza	Men's basketball	Head coach	
Jack Lengyel	Football	Assistant coach (1959)	
Joe McMullen	Football	Head coach	
Lee Owens	Football	Head coach	
Rev. Alfred W. Place	Football	Head coach	
Bob Rupert	Men's basketball	Head coach	
Fred Sefton	Men's basketball; football	Head coach	
Wyatt Webb	Men's basketball	Head coach	
Clarence Weed	Men's basketball; football	Head coach	
Earl Williams	Men's basketball	First head coach	
Harry Wilson	Football	Head coach	

=== Faculty and administrators ===
Name	Department	Notability	Reference
Paul Alfred Biefeld	Physics and Astronomy (1906–1911)	Professor (former)	
George Danhires		Professor (former)	
Meredith Gardner	German	Professor (former)	
John C. Green	Political Science		
Ralph P. Hummel	Public Administration and Urban Studies	Professor (former), author of The Bureaucratic Experience	
George Knepper	History		
Parke Kolbe		University president (former)	
Margaret Evelyn Mauch	Mathematics	Professor (former)	
Luis M. Proenza		University president (former)	
John F. Seiberling	Law	Politician	
Jim Tressel		University vice president (former)	
