= List of Akron Zips men's basketball seasons =

The Akron Zips college basketball team competes in the National Collegiate Athletic Association (NCAA) Division I, representing the University of Akron in the Mid-American Conference. The Zips have played their home games at the James A. Rhodes Arena in Akron, Ohio since 1983.

== Seasons ==
Conference division champions	Conference champions*	Conference tournament champions†	Postseason berth‡

Season	Head coach	Conference	Season results							Conference tournament result	Postseason result	Final AP Poll
Season	Head coach	Conference	Overall			Conference				Conference tournament result	Postseason result	Final AP Poll
Season	Head coach	Conference	Wins	Losses	%	Wins	Losses	%	Finish	Conference tournament result	Postseason result	Final AP Poll
Buchtel College
1901–02	No Coach	Independent (Note: "Records and History" (PDF). 2009–10 University of Akron Men’s Basketball Media Guide. Akron, Ohio: Akron Media Relations. p. 69.)	2	2	.500	—	—	—	—	—	—	—
1902–03	No Coach	Independent	4	4	.500	—	—	—	—	—	—	—
1903–04	No Coach	Independent	3	7	.300	—	—	—	—	—	—	—
1904–05	Earl Williams	Independent	8	6	.571	—	—	—	—	—	—	—
1905–06	Earl Williams	Independent	6	7	.462	—	—	—	—	—	—	—
1906–07	Earl Williams	Independent	5	2	.714	—	—	—	—	—	—	—
1907–08	Earl Williams	Independent	4	5	.444	—	—	—	—	—	—	—
1908–09	Dwight Bradley	Independent	1	0	1.000	—	—	—	—	—	—	—
1908–09	Walter East	Independent	5	7	.417	—	—	—	—	—	—	—
1909–10	Clarence Weed	Independent	5	3	.625	—	—	—	—	—	—	—
1910–11	Frank Haggerty	Independent	8	4	.667	—	—	—	—	—	—	—
1911–12	Frank Haggerty	Independent	6	3	.667	—	—	—	—	—	—	—
1912–13	Frank Haggerty	Independent	7	1	.875	—	—	—	—	—	—	—
1913–14	Frank Haggerty	Independent	6	6	.500	—	—	—	—	—	—	—
Akron Zips
1914–15	Frank Haggerty	Independent	3	9	.250	—	—	—	—	—	—	—
1915–16	Fred Sefton	Independent	5	5	.500	—	—	—	—	—	—	—
1916–17	Fred Sefton	Independent	14	2	.875	—	—	—	—	—	—	—
1917–18	Fred Sefton	Independent	9	4	.692	—	—	—	—	—	—	—
1918–19	Fred Sefton	Independent	14	0	1.000	—	—	—	—	—	—	—
1919–20	Fred Sefton	Independent	12	2	.857	—	—	—	—	—	—	—
1920–21	Fred Sefton	Independent	11	2	.846	—	—	—	—	—	—	—
1921–22	Fred Sefton	Independent	5	8	.385	—	—	—	—	—	—	—
1922–23	Fred Sefton	Independent	12	1	.923	—	—	—	—	—	—	—
1923–24	Fred Sefton	Ohio Athletic	10	3	.769	9	3	.750	6th	—	—	—
1924–25	James Coleman	Ohio Athletic	8	5	.615	8	5	.615	6th	—	—	—
1925–26	Fred Sefton	Ohio Athletic	6	7	.462	6	4	.600	6th	—	—	—
1926–27	Fred Sefton	Ohio Athletic	7	6	.538	7	5	.583	7th	—	—	—
1927–28	Red Blair	Ohio Athletic	8	5	.615	7	5	.583	7th	—	—	—
1928–29	Red Blair	Ohio Athletic	12	3	.800	12	2	.857	2nd	—	—	—
1929–30	Red Blair	Ohio Athletic	11	3	.786	10	3	.769	2nd	—	—	—
1930–31	Red Blair	Ohio Athletic	4	9	.308	3	8	.272	10th	—	—	—
1931–32	Red Blair	Ohio Athletic	8	7	.533	7	7	.500	6th	—	—	—
1932–33	Red Blair	Ohio Athletic	11	3	.786	10	3	.769	3rd	—	—	—
1933–34	Red Blair	Ohio Athletic	15	1	.938	14	1	.933	1st*	—	—	—
1934–35	Red Blair	Ohio Athletic	12	3	.800	12	3	.800	2nd	—	—	—
1935–36	Red Blair	Ohio Athletic	7	5	.583	8	6	.571	10th	—	—	—
1936–37	Paul Bixler	Independent	8	5	.615	—	—	—	—	—	—	—
1937–38	Paul Bixler	Independent	13	5	.722	—	—	—	—	—	—	—
1938–39	Paul Bixler	Independent	10	5	.667	—	—	—	—	—	—	—
1939–40	Thomas Dowler	Independent	9	14	.391	—	—	—	—	—	—	—
1940–41	Russell Beichly	Independent	13	6	.684	—	—	—	—	—	—	—
1941–42	Russell Beichly	Independent	15	3	.833	—	—	—	—	—	—	—
1942–43	Russell Beichly	Independent	18	4	.818	—	—	—	—	—	NAIA first round‡ (Note: "Year-by-Year Results" (PDF). 2009 NAIA National Championship Press Book. Kansas City, Missouri: National Association of Intercollegiate Athletics. pp. 67–84.)	—
1943–44	Russell Beichly	Independent	10	5	.667	—	—	—	—	—	—	—
1944–45	Russell Beichly	Ohio Athletic	21	2	.913	12	0	1.000	1st*	—	—	—
1945–46	Russell Beichly	Ohio Athletic	19	5	.792	11	2	.846	1st*	—	—	—
1946–47	Russell Beichly	Ohio Athletic	17	10	.630	9	3	.750	2nd	—	—	—
1947–48	Russell Beichly	Ohio Athletic	15	9	.625	7	5	.583	8th	—	—	—
1948–49	Russell Beichly	Ohio Athletic	16	6	.727	5	4	.556	6th	Champion† (Note: One OAC tournament was played in 1949, and then the tournaments returned in 1960. Full results are only available from 1970 to the present.)	—	—
1949–50	Russell Beichly	Ohio Athletic	16	9	.640	4	1	.800	2nd	—	—	—
1950–51	Russell Beichly	Ohio Athletic	3	20	.130	1	5	.167	11th	—	—	—
1951–52	Russell Beichly	Ohio Athletic	4	20	.167	2	7	.222	12th	—	—	—
1952–53	Russell Beichly	Ohio Athletic	17	7	.708	10	1	.909	1st*	—	—	—
1953–54	Russell Beichly	Ohio Athletic	10	11	.476	7	4	.636	6th	—	—	—
1954–55	Russell Beichly	Ohio Athletic	17	5	.773	9	4	.692	5th	—	—	—
1955–56	Russell Beichly	Ohio Athletic	18	5	.783	11	1	.917	1st*	—	—	—
1956–57	Russell Beichly	Ohio Athletic	18	7	.720	9	3	.750	4th	—	—	—
1957–58	Russell Beichly	Ohio Athletic	20	6	.769	12	0	1.000	1st*	—	NCAA DII Regional Finalist‡ (Note: "Division II Championship" (PDF). Official 2008 NCAA Men's Basketball Record Book. Indianapolis, Indiana: The National Collegiate Athletic Association. pp. 213–219. ISSN 1089-5280.)	—
1958–59	Russell Beichly	Ohio Athletic	21	2	.913	10	1	.909	2nd	—	—	—
1959–60	Tony Laterza	Ohio Athletic	17	8	.680	8	3	.727	3rd	Finalist	—	—
1960–61	Tony Laterza	Ohio Athletic	18	7	.720	9	3	.750	3rd	Finalist	—	—
1961–62	Tony Laterza	Ohio Athletic	18	6	.750	10	4	.714	4th	Finalist	—	—
1962–63	Tony Laterza	Ohio Athletic	22	3	.880	12	2	.857	3rd	Finalist	—	—
1963–64	Tony Laterza	Ohio Athletic	24	7	.774	11	3	.785	3rd	Champion†	NCAA DII National Finalist‡	—
1964–65	Tony Laterza	Ohio Athletic	21	7	.750	12	2	.857	1st*	Champion†	NCAA DII Quarterfinals‡	—
1965–66	Tony Laterza	Ohio Athletic	24	4	.857	11	2	.846	1st*	Champion†	NCAA DII semifinals‡	—
1966–67	Tony Laterza	Independent	20	5	.800	—	—	—	—	—	NCAA DII Regional Finalists‡	—
1967–68	Tony Laterza	Independent	14	12	.538	—	—	—	—	—	—	—
1968–69	Wyatt Webb	Independent	8	18	.308	—	—	—	—	—	—	—
1969–70	Wyatt Webb	Independent	12	11	.522	—	—	—	—	—	—	—
1970–71	Wyatt Webb	Independent	20	6	.769	—	—	—	—	—	NCAA DII first round‡	—
1971–72	Wyatt Webb	Independent	26	5	.839	—	—	—	—	—	NCAA DII National Finalist‡	—
1972–73	Wyatt Webb	Independent	22	5	.815	—	—	—	—	—	NCAA DII Quarterfinals‡	—
1973–74	Wyatt Webb	Independent	18	6	.750	—	—	—	—	—	—	—
1974–75	Wyatt Webb	Independent	20	9	.689	—	—	—	—	—	NCAA DII Quarterfinals‡	—
1975–76	Alex Adams	Independent	10	14	.417	—	—	—	—	—	—	—
1976–77	Ken Cunningham	Independent	13	12	.520	—	—	—	—	—	—	—
1977–78	Ken Cunningham	Mid-Continent (Note: Mid-Continent Conference (now known as The Summit League) results are only available from its establishment as a Division I conference in 1982 to the present.)	9	18	.333	1	6	.143	—	—	—	—
1978–79	Ken Cunningham	Mid-Continent	10	17	.370	2	8	.200	—	—	—	—
1979–80	Ken Cunningham	Independent (Note: Akron's first year competing in NCAA Division I)	10	14	.417	—	—	—	—	—	—	—
1980–81	Bob Rupert	Ohio Valley	8	18	.308	5	9	.357	6th	—	—	—
1981–82	Bob Rupert	Ohio Valley	7	19	.269	3	13	.188	8th	—	—	—
1982–83	Bob Rupert	Ohio Valley	14	15	.482	7	7	.500	4th	Finalist	—	—
1983–84	Bob Rupert	Ohio Valley	8	19	.296	3	11	.214	8th	—	—	—
1984–85	Bob Huggins	Ohio Valley	12	14	.462	6	8	.429	6th	—	—	—
1985–86	Bob Huggins	Ohio Valley	22	8	.733	10	4	.714	1st*	Champion†	NCAA first round‡ (Note: "Division I Championship" (PDF). Official 2008 NCAA Men's Basketball Record Book. Indianapolis, Indiana: The National Collegiate Athletic Association. pp. 198–203. ISSN 1089-5280.)	—
1986–87	Bob Huggins	Ohio Valley	21	9	.700	9	5	.643	2nd	Semifinals	NIT first round‡	—
1987–88	Bob Huggins	Independent	21	7	.750	—	—	—	—	—	—	—
1988–89	Bob Huggins	Independent	21	8	.724	—	—	—	—	—	NIT first round‡	—
1989–90	Coleman Crawford	Independent	16	12	.571	—	—	—	—	—	—	—
1990–91	Coleman Crawford	Mid-Continent	15	13	.536	6	10	.375	7th	Quarterfinals	—	—
1991–92	Coleman Crawford	Mid-Continent	16	12	.571	10	6	.625	2nd	Quarterfinals	—	—
1992–93	Coleman Crawford	Mid-American	8	18	.308	3	15	.167	10th	—	—	—
1993–94	Coleman Crawford	Mid-American	8	18	.308	2	16	.111	10th	—	—	—
1994–95	Coleman Crawford	Mid-American	8	18	.308	4	14	.222	9th	—	—	—
1995–96	Dan Hipsher	Mid-American	3	23	.115	0	18	.000	10th	—	—	—
1996–97	Dan Hipsher	Mid-American	8	18	.308	6	12	.333	9th	—	—	—
1997–98	Dan Hipsher	Mid-American	17	10	.630	13	5	.722	1st-East*	Quarterfinals	—	—
1998–99	Dan Hipsher	Mid-American	18	9	.667	12	6	.667	3rd-East	Quarterfinals	—	—
1999–00	Dan Hipsher	Mid-American	17	11	.607	11	7	.611	3rd-East	first round	—	—
2000–01	Dan Hipsher	Mid-American	12	16	.429	9	9	.500	6th-East	first round	—	—
2001–02	Dan Hipsher	Mid-American	10	21	.323	5	13	.278	7th-East	Quarterfinals	—	—
2002–03	Dan Hipsher	Mid-American	14	14	.500	9	9	.500	3rd-East	first round	—	—
2003–04	Dan Hipsher	Mid-American	13	15	.464	7	11	.389	5th-East	first round	—	—
2004–05	Keith Dambrot	Mid-American	19	10	.655	11	7	.611	4th-East	Quarterfinals	—	—
2005–06	Keith Dambrot	Mid-American	23	10	.670	14	4	.778	2nd-East	semifinals	NIT second round‡	—
2006–07	Keith Dambrot	Mid-American	26	7	.788	13	3	.813	1st-East*	Finalist	—	—
2007–08	Keith Dambrot	Mid-American	24	11	.686	11	6	.647	2nd-East	Finalist	NIT second round‡	—
2008–09	Keith Dambrot	Mid-American	23	13	.639	10	6	.625	3rd-East	Champion†	NCAA first round‡	—
2009–10	Keith Dambrot	Mid-American	24	11	.686	12	4	.750	2nd-East	Finalist	CBI first round	—
2010–11	Keith Dambrot	Mid-American	23	13	.639	9	7	.600	T-3rd-East	Champion†	NCAA second round‡	—
2011–12	Keith Dambrot	Mid-American	22	12	.647	13	3	.813	1st-East	Finalist	NIT first round‡	—
2012–13	Keith Dambrot	Mid-American	26	7	.788	14	2	.875	T-1st-East	Champion†	NCAA second round‡	—
2013–14	Keith Dambrot	Mid-American	21	13	.618	12	6	.667	2nd-East	semifinals	CIT first round‡	—
2014–15	Keith Dambrot	Mid-American	21	14	.600	9	9	.500	4th-East	semifinals	—	—
2015–16	Keith Dambrot	Mid-American	26	9	.743	13	5	.722	1st-East	Finalist	NIT first round‡	—
2016–17	Keith Dambrot	Mid-American	27	9	.750	14	4	.778	1st-East	Finalist	NIT second round‡	—
2017–18	John Groce	Mid-American	14	18	.438	6	12	.333	6th-East	Quarterfinals	—	—
2018–19	John Groce	Mid-American	17	16	.515	8	10	.444	4th-East	Quarterfinals	—	—
2019–20	John Groce	Mid-American	24	7	.774	14	4	.778	1st-East	Cancelled due to the COVID-19 pandemic	—	—
2020–21	John Groce	Mid-American	15	8	.652	12	6	.667	T-3rd	Semifinals	—	—
2021–22	John Groce	Mid-American	24	10	.706	14	6	.700	T-3rd	Champion†	NCAA First round‡	—
2022–23	John Groce	Mid-American	22	11	.667	13	5	.722	3rd	Semifinals	—	—
2023–24	John Groce	Mid-American	24	11	.686	13	5	.722	T-2nd	Champions†	NCAA First round‡	—
2024–25	John Groce	Mid-American	28	7	.800	17	1	.944	1st*	Champions†	NCAA First round‡	—
2025-26	John Groce	Mid-American	29	7	.806	17	1	.944	1st*	Champions†	NCAA 2026 NCAA Division I men's basketball tournament	—
