= Akron Zips men's basketball statistical leaders =

The Akron Zips men's basketball statistical leaders are individual statistical leaders of the Akron Zips men's basketball program in various categories, including points, rebounds, assists, steals, and blocks. Within those areas, the lists identify single-game, single-season, and career leaders. The Zips represent the University of Akron in the NCAA's Mid-American Conference.

Akron began competing in intercollegiate basketball in 1901. However, the school's record book does not generally list records from before the 1950s, as records from before this period are often incomplete and inconsistent. Since scoring was much lower in this era, and teams played much fewer games during a typical season, it is likely that few or no players from this era would appear on these lists anyway.

The NCAA did not officially record assists as a stat until the 1983–84 season, and blocks and steals until the 1985–86 season, but Akron's record books includes players in these stats before these seasons. These lists are updated through the end of the 2020–21 season.

== Scoring ==
Career
Rk	Player	Points	Seasons
1	Joe Jakubick	2,583	1980–81 1981–82 1982–83 1983–84
2	Len Paul	2,028	1969–70 1970–71 1971–72 1972–73
3	Enrique Freeman	1,843	2019–20 2020-21 2021-22 2022–23 2023–24
4	Eric McLaughlin	1,810	1985–86 1986–87 1987–88 1989–90
5	John Britton	1,657	1975–76 1976–77 1977–78 1978–79
6	Bill Turner	1,630	1963–64 1964–65 1965–66 1966–67
7	Loren Cristian Jackson	1,587	2018–19 2019–20 2020–21
8	Jimmal Ball	1,577	1996–97 1997–98 1998–99 1999–00
9	Romeo Travis	1,491	2003–04 2004–05 2005–06 2006–07
10	Don Williams	1,445	1963–64 1964–65 1965–66 1966–67

Season
Rk	Player	Points	Season
1	Joe Jakubick	827	1982–83
2	Joe Jakubick	814	1983–84
3	Tavari Johnson	688	2025–26
4	John Britton	676	1978–79
5	Xavier Castaneda	674	2022–23
6	Enrique Freeman	652	2023–24
7	Eric McLaughlin	631	1989–90
8	Loren Cristian Jackson	615	2019–20
9	Derrick Tarver	612	2003–04
10	Marcel Boyce	601	1986–87

Single game
Rk	Player	Points	Season	Opponent
1	Jimond Ivey	48	2017–18	Ball State
2	Joe Jakubick	47	1982–83	Murray State
3	Mike Harkins	46	1955–56	Heidelberg
	Joe Jakubick	46	1982–83	Kent State
5	Jim Fenton	45	1952–53	Hiram
6	Joe Jakubick	44	1982–83	Morehead St.
	Jimmal Ball	44	1996–97	Xavier
	Derrick Tarver	44	2003–04	Hampton
	Derrick Tarver	44	2003–04	Wright St.
10	Derrick Tarver	43	2002–03	Central Mich.

== Rebounds ==
Career
Rk	Player	Rebounds	Seasons
1	Enrique Freeman	1,405	2019–20 2020–21 2021–22 2022–23 2023–24
2	Fred Golding	1,360	1955–56 1956–57 1957–58 1958–59
3	Don Williams	1,218	1963–64 1964–65 1965–66 1966–67
4	Ray Pryear	1,213	1955–56 1956–57 1957–58 1958–59
5	Bill Turner	1,171	1963–64 1964–65 1965–66 1966–67
6	Len Paul	1,021	1969–70 1970–71 1971–72 1972–73
7	Frank Thompson	996	1962–63 1963–64 1964–65 1965–66
8	Alex Adams	872	1959–60 1960–61
9	Harvey Glover	801	1969–70 1970–71 1971–72 1972–73
10	Romeo Travis	783	2003–04 2004–05 2005–06 2006–07

Season
Rk	Player	Rebounds	Season
1	Enrique Freeman	453	2023–24
2	Fred Golding	400	1956–57
3	Bill Turner	375	1964–65
4	Enrique Freeman	370	2022–23
5	Enrique Freeman	367	2021–22
6	Elton Landahl	361	1954–55
7	Frank Thompson	348	1963–64
8	Fred Golding	341	1955–56
9	Don Williams	340	1965–66
10	Ray Pryear	336	1958–59

Single game
Rk	Player	Rebounds	Season	Opponent
1	Mel Kiser	28	1954–55	Capital
	Ray Pryear	28	1958–59	DePauw
3	Elton Landahl	27	1954–55	Denison
	Bill Turner	27	1964–65	Baldwin-Wallace
5	Fred Golding	25	1955–56	Mt. Union
	Elton Landahl	25	1954–55	Heidelberg
	Roger Johnson	25	1968–69	Ill. Wesleyan
8	Ray Pryear	24	1958–59	Baldwin-Wallace
	Fred Golding	24	1956–57	Denison
	Greg Parham	24	1974–75	St. Joseph’s (Ind.)

== Assists ==
Career
Rk	Player	Assists	Seasons
1	Dru Joyce	503	2003–04 2004–05 2005–06 2006–07
2	Eric McLaughlin	476	1985–86 1986–87 1987–88 1989–90
3	Alex Abreu	450	2010–11 2011–12 2012–13
4	Tavari Johnson	401	2022–23 2023–24 2024–25 2025–26
5	Jimmal Ball	391	1996–97 1997–98 1998–99 1999–00
6	Loren Cristian Jackson	381	2018–19 2019–20 2020–21
7	Nate Barnett	351	1972–73 1973–74 1974–75
8	Andy Hipsher	344	1999–00 2000–01 2001–02 2002–03 2003–04
9	Nick Dials	326	2005–06 2006–07 2007–08
10	Steve McNees	318	2007–08 2008–09 2009–10 2010–11

Season
Rk	Player	Assists	Season
1	Tavari Johnson	176	2025–26
2	Alex Abreu	173	2012–13
3	Dru Joyce	165	2005–06
4	Eric McLaughlin	156	1989–90
5	Alex Abreu	149	2011–12
6	Nick Dials	148	2007–08
7	Dru Joyce	143	2006–07
8	Loren Cristian Jackson	141	2020–21
9	Mike Dowdell	138	1986–87
	Eric McLaughlin	138	1987–88
	Loren Cristian Jackson	138	2019–20

Single game
Rk	Player	Assists	Season	Opponent
1	Reggie Hannah	13	1977–78	Western Ill.
2	Wendell Bates	12	1979–80	Kent St.
3	Tavari Johnson	11	2025–26	Milwaukee
	Loren Cristian Jackson	11	2020–21	Ball State
	Dru Joyce	11	2005–06	Buffalo
	Eric McLaughlin	11	1989–90	Youngstown St.
7	Len Paul	10	1971–72	Southern Colo.
	Nate Barnett	10	1973–74	Cleveland St.
	Nate Barnett	10	1974–75	Youngstown St.
	Rod Leighty	10	1978–79	Eastern Illinois
	Wendell Bates	10	1980–81	Cleveland St.
	Wendell Bates	10	1980–81	Morehead St.
	Mike Dowling	10	1983–84	Murray State
	Mike Fenwick	10	1984–85	Austin Peay
	Eric McLaughlin	10	1985–86	Urbana
	Eric McLaughlin	10	1987–88	Brooklyn
	Eric McLaughlin	10	1989–90	MTSU
	Andy Hipsher	10	2002–03	Central Mich.
	Dru Joyce	10	2004–05	Hampton
	Dru Joyce	10	2004–05	Buffalo
	Dru Joyce	10	2005–06	Eastern Mich.
	Dru Joyce	10	2006–07	UIC
	Dru Joyce	10	2006–07	Youngstown St.
	Alex Abreu	10	2011–12	Valparaiso
	Alex Abreu	10	2011–12	Northwestern
	Jimond Ivey	10	2017–18	Appalachian State
	Loren Cristian Jackson	10	2020–21	Malone University
	Loren Cristian Jackson	10	2020–21	Central Michigan
	Tavari Johnson	10	2024–25	Eastern Michigan
	Nate Johnson	10	2024–25	South Alabama
	Tavari Johnson	10	2025–26	Central Michigan

== Steals ==
Career
Rk	Player	Steals	Seasons
1	Jimmal Ball	242	1996–97 1997–98 1998–99 1999–00
2	Joe Jakubick	189	1980–81 1981–82 1982–83 1983–84
3	Nate Linhart	186	2005–06 2006–07 2007–08 2008–09
4	Eric McLaughlin	177	1985–86 1986–87 1987–88 1989–90
5	Jami Bosley	165	1997–98 1998–99 1999–00
6	Shawn Roberts	156	1985–86 1986–87 1987–88 1988–89
7	Andy Hipsher	140	1999–00 2000–01 2001–02 2002–03 2003–04
8	Roy Coleman	136	1990–91 1991–92
9	Alex Abreu	135	2010–11 2011–12 2012–13
10	Cedrick Middleton	131	2004–05 2005–06 2006–07 2007–08

Season
Rk	Player	Steals	Season
1	Roy Coleman	75	1991–92
2	Jimmal Ball	72	1999–00
3	Jimmal Ball	64	1997–98
4	Nate Linhart	62	2008–09
5	Roy Coleman	61	1990–91
	Johnny Hollingsworth	61	2002–03
	Russell Holmes	61	1985–86
	Nate Johnson	61	2024–25
9	Shawn Roberts	59	1988–89
	Evan Mahaffey	59	2025–26

Single game
Rk	Player	Steals	Season	Opponent
1	Jimmal Ball	9	1999–00	Eastern Mich.
2	Shawn Roberts	8	1987–88	Chicago St.
3	Wayne Pierce	7	1982–83	John Carroll
	Russell Holmes	7	1985–86	Tenn. Tech
	Roy Coleman	7	1990–91	Northeastern Ill.
	Jimmal Ball	7	1999–00	Buffalo
7	James Merchant	6	1984–85	Edinboro
	Roy Coleman	6	1991–92	Miss. Valley
	Tron Jenkins	6	1993–94	Kent State
	Anthony Stanford	6	1993–94	Ohio
	Cornell Mann	6	1994–95	Central Mich.
	Scott Gooden	6	1997–98	Loyola-Chicago
	Jami Bosley	6	1997–98	Duquesne
	Jawanza Moore	6	1998–99	Eastern Mich.
	Jimmal Ball	6	1998–99	Cleveland St.
	Jimmal Ball	6	1999–00	Ohio
	Johnny Hollingsworth	6	2002–03	Radford
	Andy Hipsher	6	2002–03	Ohio
	Alex Abreu	6	2011–12	Mississippi St.

== Blocks ==
Career
Rk	Player	Blocks	Seasons
1	Zeke Marshall	368	2009–10 2010–11 2011–12 2012–13
2	Enrique Freeman	188	2019–20 2020–21 2021–22 2022–23 2023–24
3	Romeo Travis	165	2003–04 2004–05 2005–06 2006–07
4	Isaiah Johnson	143	2013–14 2014–15 2015–16 2016–17
5	Bruce Weinkein	109	1997–98 1998–99 1999–00 2000–01
6	Kwan Cheatham	108	2013–14 2014–15 2015–16 2016–17
7	George Phillips	107	1995–96 1996–97 1997–98 1999–00
8	Rob Preston	86	2001–02 2002–03 2003–04 2004–05 2005–06
9	Joel Price	82	1978–79 1980–81
10	Amani Lyles	77	2022–23 2023–24 2024–25 2025–26

Season
Rk	Player	Blocks	Season
1	Zeke Marshall	122	2012–13
2	Zeke Marshall	95	2011–12
3	Zeke Marshall	92	2010–11
4	Romeo Travis	65	2006–07
5	Enrique Freeman	61	2023–24
6	Zeke Marshall	59	2009–10
7	Joel Price	58	1978–79
8	Isaiah Johnson	47	2015–16
9	Romeo Travis	45	2004–05
10	Enrique Freeman	44	2020–21

Single game
Rk	Player	Blocks	Season	Opponent
1	Zeke Marshall	9	2012–13	Toledo
	Zeke Marshall	9	2010–11	Kent State
3	Enrique Freeman	7	2023–24	Ohio
	Zeke Marshall	7	2012–13	Kent State
	Zeke Marshall	7	2011–12	UAPB
5	Emmanuel Olojakpoke	6	2018–19	Bowling Green
	Zeke Marshall	6	2012–13	Buffalo
	Zeke Marshall	6	2012–13	Penn State
	Zeke Marshall	6	2012–13	JCU
	Zeke Marshall	6	2011–12	VCU
	Zeke Marshall	6	2009–10	EMU
	Zeke Marshall	6	2009–10	Niagara
	Romeo Travis	6	2006–07	Duquesne
	Romeo Travis	6	2006–07	UIC
	Bruce Weinkein	6	1999–00	Western Mich.
	Ken Cullifer	6	1987–88	Youngstown St.
