= Laterza (surname) =

Laterza is an Italian surname. Notable people with the surname include:

- Jerry Laterza (born 1974), Paraguayan–American soccer player
- Marco Laterza, Swiss fitness model and bodybuilder
- Tom Laterza (born 1992), Luxembourgish soccer player
- Tony Laterza, American basketball coach
