= 1924 Oberlin Congregationalists football team =

American college football season

1924 Oberlin Congregationalists football
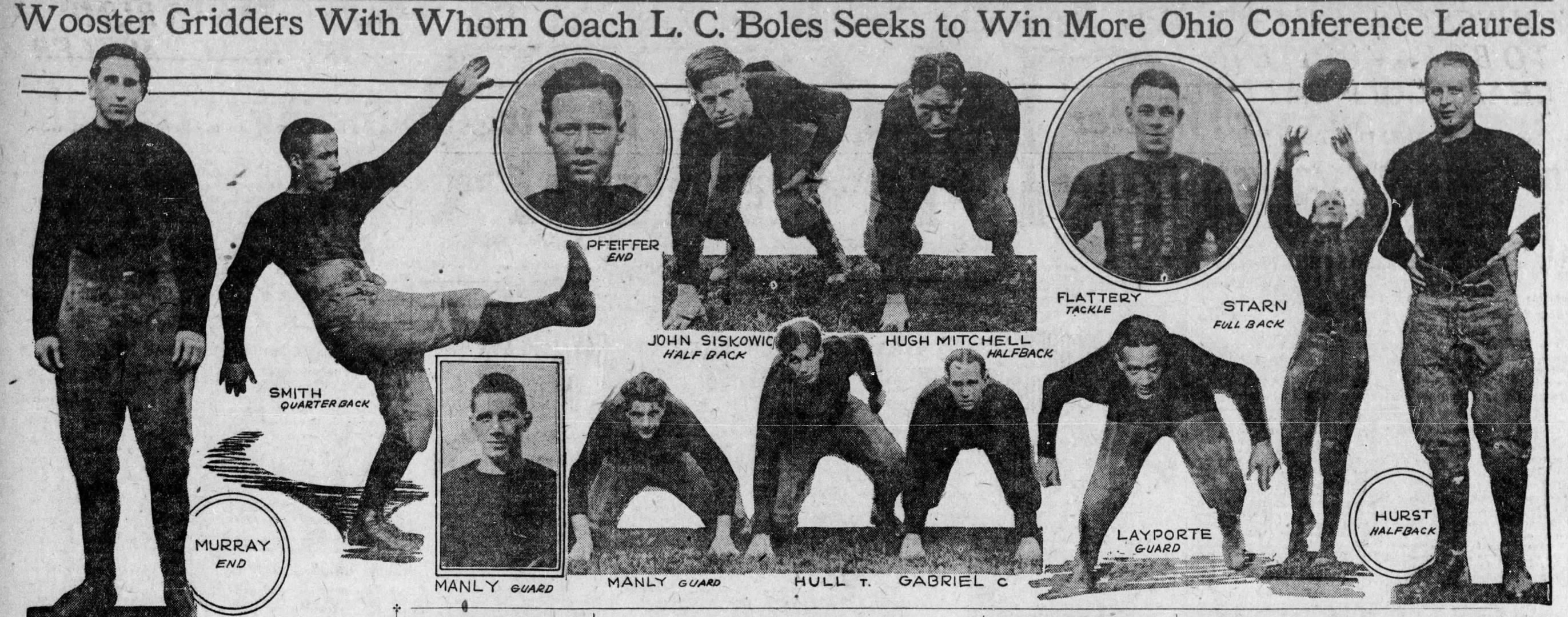

OAC champion
- Conference: Ohio Athletic Conference
- Record: 8–0 (8–0 OAC)
- Head coach: William L. Hughes (1st season)
- Captain: Butler

1924 Ohio Athletic Conference football standings
| | Conf. | | | | | Overall |
| Team | W | | L | | T | W | | L | | T |
|---|---|---|---|---|---|---|---|---|---|---|
| Oberlin $ | 8 | – | 0 | – | 0 | 8 | – | 0 | – | 0 |
| Wittenberg | 6 | – | 1 | – | 0 | 7 | – | 1 | – | 0 |
| Ohio Wesleyan | 4 | – | 1 | – | 0 | 7 | – | 2 | – | 0 |
| Case | 6 | – | 2 | – | 1 | 6 | – | 2 | – | 1 |
| Wooster | 5 | – | 2 | – | 1 | 6 | – | 2 | – | 2 |
| Akron | 3 | – | 2 | – | 0 | 5 | – | 3 | – | 0 |
| Western Reserve | 3 | – | 2 | – | 2 | 5 | – | 2 | – | 2 |
| Heidelberg | 3 | – | 2 | – | 2 | 3 | – | 3 | – | 2 |
| Mount Union | 4 | – | 3 | – | 1 | 5 | – | 4 | – | 1 |
| Ohio Northern | 3 | – | 3 | – | 1 | 4 | – | 3 | – | 1 |
| St. Xavier | 1 | – | 1 | – | 1 | 2 | – | 5 | – | 1 |
| Kenyon | 3 | – | 4 | – | 1 | 4 | – | 4 | – | 1 |
| Denison | 3 | – | 4 | – | 0 | 3 | – | 4 | – | 1 |
| Ohio | 2 | – | 4 | – | 0 | 4 | – | 4 | – | 0 |
| Otterbein | 2 | – | 5 | – | 0 | 2 | – | 5 | – | 0 |
| Muskingum | 2 | – | 5 | – | 0 | 2 | – | 6 | – | 0 |
| Cincinnati | 1 | – | 4 | – | 0 | 2 | – | 6 | – | 1 |
| Baldwin–Wallace | 1 | – | 4 | – | 0 | 1 | – | 7 | – | 0 |
| Miami (OH) | 1 | – | 5 | – | 0 | 2 | – | 6 | – | 0 |
| Hiram | 0 | – | 7 | – | 0 | 1 | – | 7 | – | 0 |
$ – Conference champion

The 1924 Oberlin Congregationalists football team was an American football team that represented Oberlin College of Oberlin, Ohio, in the Ohio Athletic Conference (OAC) during the 1924 college football season. In their first and only season under head coach William L. Hughes, the Congregationalists compiled a perfect 8–0 record (8–0 in conference games), won the OAC championship, shut out five of eight opponents, and outscored all opponents by a total of 151 to 16. It was the first of two consecutive undefeated seasons, as the 1925 team compiled a 7–0–1 record. The undefeated streak continued for 22 games, ending on November 13, 1926. In the four seasons from 1924 to 1927, Oberlin lost only two games.

Four Oberlin players received first- or second-team honors on the All-OAC football teams: senior fullback Mox Weber (Coaches-1, INS-1, CPD-1, DDN-1); senior Lyle Butler at end (Coaches-1, INS-1, CPD-1, DDN-1); Appel at guard (INS-1); Harold McPhee at halfback (CPD-2).

At the end of the undefeated 1924 season, a campaign was approved to build a stadium on Oberlin's campus with seating for 5,200 persons.

== Schedule ==
| Date | Opponent | Site | Result | Attendance | Source |
|---|---|---|---|---|---|
| September 27 | Hiram | Oberlin, OH | W 41–0 | | |
| October 4 | Baldwin–Wallace | Oberlin, OH | W 39–0 | | |
| October 11 | at Ohio | Athens, OH | W 13–7 | | |
| October 18 | at Western Reserve | Van Horn Field; Cleveland, OH | W 27–7 | | |
| October 25 | Denison | Oberlin, OH | W 3–0 | | |
| November 1 | at Case | Oberlin, OH | W 2–0 | 6,000 | |
| November 8 | Cincinnati | Nippert Memorial Stadium; Cincinnati, OH | W 13–0 | > 10,000 | |
| November 15 | Miami (OH) | Oberlin, OH | W 13–2 | | |

== Game summaries ==
=== Cincinnati ===
On November, Oberlin won its seventh consecutive gam, shutting out Cincinnati, 13–0, before a crowd of more than 10,000 spectators at the dedication game for Cincinnati's Nippert Memorial Stadium, named in honor of a football player who was killed during a game in 1923.

=== Miami (OH) ===
Oberlin concluded its season on November 15 with a 13–2 victory over Miami (OH). In the opening minutes of the game, Miami blocked an Oberlin punt on Oberlin's 10-yard line, and an Oberlin player recovered the ball behind the goal line for a safety, giving Miami a 2–0 lead. Oberlin responded with a long drive capped by a touchdown run by left halfback Harold McPhee. McPhee scored again in the fourth quarter on a wide end run. McPhee also kicked an extra point, as he scored all 13 Oberlin points.
