= Ken Cunningham =

Ken Cunningham may refer to:

- K. G. Cunningham (born 1939), South Australian radio presenter and cricketer
- Ken Cunningham (basketball) (1943–2015), college basketball coach
- Kenny Cunningham (born 1971), Irish former footballer
- Ken Cunningham (diplomat), New Zealand ambassador to Chile, Saudi Arabia and others
- Ken Cunningham (politician), treasurer of the Constitution Party of Oregon
