= Laterza =

Laterza may refer to

- Laterza, Apulia, town and comune in the province of Taranto, part of the Apulia region of southeast Italy
- Editori Laterza, Italian publishing house
- Laterza (surname), Italian surname
- Laterza culture, Eneolithic culture in Southern Italy
- Scrittori d'Italia Laterza, an Italian book collection
