= 1924 University of Akron football team =

American college football season

1924 Akron football
- Conference: Ohio Athletic Conference
- Record: 5–3 (3–2 OAC)
- Head coach: James W. Coleman (1st season)
- Captain: Ken Mason
- Home stadium: Buchtel Field

1924 Ohio Athletic Conference football standings
	Conf.					Overall
Team	W		L		T	W		L		T
Oberlin $	8	–	0	–	0	8	–	0	–	0
Wittenberg	6	–	1	–	0	7	–	1	–	0
Ohio Wesleyan	4	–	1	–	0	7	–	2	–	0
Case	6	–	2	–	1	6	–	2	–	1
Wooster	5	–	2	–	1	6	–	2	–	2
Akron	3	–	2	–	0	5	–	3	–	0
Western Reserve	3	–	2	–	2	5	–	2	–	2
Heidelberg	3	–	2	–	2	3	–	3	–	2
Mount Union	4	–	3	–	1	5	–	4	–	1
Ohio Northern	3	–	3	–	1	4	–	3	–	1
St. Xavier	1	–	1	–	1	2	–	5	–	1
Kenyon	3	–	4	–	1	4	–	4	–	1
Denison	3	–	4	–	0	3	–	4	–	1
Ohio	2	–	4	–	0	4	–	4	–	0
Otterbein	2	–	5	–	0	2	–	5	–	0
Muskingum	2	–	5	–	0	2	–	6	–	0
Cincinnati	1	–	4	–	0	2	–	6	–	1
Baldwin–Wallace	1	–	4	–	0	1	–	7	–	0
Miami (OH)	1	–	5	–	0	2	–	6	–	0
Hiram	0	–	7	–	0	1	–	7	–	0
$ – Conference champion

The 1924 Akron football team was an American football team that represented the University of Akron in the Ohio Athletic Conference during the 1924 college football season. In its first season under head coach James W. Coleman, the team compiled a 5–3 record (3–2 against conference opponents) and outscored opponents by a total of 89 to 75. Ken Mason was the team captain.

== Schedule ==
Date	Opponent	Site	Result	Source
October 4	Hillsdale*	Buchtel Field; Akron, OH	L 6–18	
October 11	at Wooster	Wooster, OH	W 7–6	
October 25	at Mount Union	Alliance, OH	L 2–6	
November 1	Baldwin–Wallace	Buchtel Field; Akron, OH	W 16–0	
November 8	at Ohio Wesleyan	Delaware, OH	L 7–17	
November 15	Ashland*	Buchtel Field; Akron, OH	W 20–14	
November 22	Toledo*	Buchtel Field; Akron, OH	W 14–7	
November 27	Kenyon	Buchtel Field; Akron, OH	W 17–7	
*Non-conference game
