= 1924 Cincinnati Bearcats football team =

American college football season

1924 Cincinnati Bearcats football
- Conference: Ohio Athletic Conference
- Record: 2–6–1 (1–4 OAC)
- Head coach: George McLaren (3rd season)
- Captain: Tony McAndrews
- Home stadium: Nippert Stadium

1924 Ohio Athletic Conference football standings
| | Conf. | | | | | Overall |
| Team | W | | L | | T | W | | L | | T |
|---|---|---|---|---|---|---|---|---|---|---|
| Oberlin $ | 8 | – | 0 | – | 0 | 8 | – | 0 | – | 0 |
| Wittenberg | 6 | – | 1 | – | 0 | 7 | – | 1 | – | 0 |
| Ohio Wesleyan | 4 | – | 1 | – | 0 | 7 | – | 2 | – | 0 |
| Case | 6 | – | 2 | – | 1 | 6 | – | 2 | – | 1 |
| Wooster | 5 | – | 2 | – | 1 | 6 | – | 2 | – | 2 |
| Akron | 3 | – | 2 | – | 0 | 5 | – | 3 | – | 0 |
| Western Reserve | 3 | – | 2 | – | 2 | 5 | – | 2 | – | 2 |
| Heidelberg | 3 | – | 2 | – | 2 | 3 | – | 3 | – | 2 |
| Mount Union | 4 | – | 3 | – | 1 | 5 | – | 4 | – | 1 |
| Ohio Northern | 3 | – | 3 | – | 1 | 4 | – | 3 | – | 1 |
| St. Xavier | 1 | – | 1 | – | 1 | 2 | – | 5 | – | 1 |
| Kenyon | 3 | – | 4 | – | 1 | 4 | – | 4 | – | 1 |
| Denison | 3 | – | 4 | – | 0 | 3 | – | 4 | – | 1 |
| Ohio | 2 | – | 4 | – | 0 | 4 | – | 4 | – | 0 |
| Otterbein | 2 | – | 5 | – | 0 | 2 | – | 5 | – | 0 |
| Muskingum | 2 | – | 5 | – | 0 | 2 | – | 6 | – | 0 |
| Cincinnati | 1 | – | 4 | – | 0 | 2 | – | 6 | – | 1 |
| Baldwin–Wallace | 1 | – | 4 | – | 0 | 1 | – | 7 | – | 0 |
| Miami (OH) | 1 | – | 5 | – | 0 | 2 | – | 6 | – | 0 |
| Hiram | 0 | – | 7 | – | 0 | 1 | – | 7 | – | 0 |
$ – Conference champion

The 1924 Cincinnati Bearcats football team was an American football team that represented the University of Cincinnati as a member of the Buckeye Athletic Association during the 1924 college football season. In their third season under head coach George McLaren, the Bearcats compiled a 2–6–1 record (1–4 against conference opponents). Tony McAndrews was the team captain. The team played home games at Nippert Stadium in Cincinnati.

The new stadium, James Gamble Nippert Memorial Stadium, was dedicated November 8, 1924. It was named as a monument to Jimmy Nippert, a Cincinnati football player who died of injuries sustained in a football game in 1923.

== Schedule ==
| Date | Opponent | Site | Result | Attendance | Source |
|---|---|---|---|---|---|
| September 27 | Kentucky Wesleyan* | Nippert Stadium; Cincinnati, OH | T 6–6 | | |
| October 4 | Georgetown (KY)* | Nippert Stadium; Cincinnati, OH | W 33–21 | | |
| October 11 | at Northwestern* | Northwestern Field; Evanston, IL | L 0–42 | | |
| October 18 | Denison | Nippert Stadium; Cincinnati, OH | L 7–13 | | |
| October 25 | at Ohio Northern | Ada, OH | L 0–9 | | |
| November 1 | Dayton* | Nippert Stadium; Cincinnati, OH | L 0–21 | | |
| November 8 | Oberlin | Nippert Stadium; Cincinnati, OH | L 0–13 | 10,000 | |
| November 15 | at Wooster | Wooster, OH | L 0–32 | | |
| November 27 | Miami (OH) | Nippert Stadium; Cincinnati, OH (Victory Bell) | W 8–7 | | |
*Non-conference game
