= 1986 Ohio Valley Conference men's basketball tournament =

- Classification: Division I
- Season: 1985–86
- Teams: 7
- Site: James A. Rhodes Arena; Akron, Ohio
- Champions: Akron (1st title)
- Winning coach: Bob Huggins (1st title)

1985–86 Ohio Valley Conference men's basketball standings
	Conf.				Overall
Team	W		L	PCT	W		L	PCT
Akron †	10	–	4	.714	22	–	8	.733
Middle Tennessee	10	–	4	.714	23	–	11	.676
Murray State	8	–	6	.571	17	–	12	.586
Austin Peay	8	–	6	.571	14	–	14	.500
Youngstown State	8	–	6	.571	14	–	15	.483
Tennessee Tech	6	–	8	.429	14	–	15	.483
Eastern Kentucky	5	–	9	.357	10	–	18	.357
Morehead State	1	–	13	.071	8	–	19	.296
† 1986 OVC tournament winner Rankings from AP Poll

The 1986 Ohio Valley Conference men's basketball tournament was the final event of the 1985–86 season in the Ohio Valley Conference. The tournament was held March 3–5, 1986, at James A. Rhodes Arena in Akron, Ohio.

Akron defeated Middle Tennessee State in the championship game, 68–63, to win their first OVC men's basketball tournament.

The Zips received an automatic bid to the 1986 NCAA tournament as the No. 15 seed in the Midwest region.

== Bracket ==
Quarterfinals; Tuesday, March 3
3	Youngstown State	68
6	Tennessee Tech	71
4	Murray State	78
5	Austin Peay	66
2	Middle Tennessee	88
7	Eastern Kentucky	65

Semifinals; Wednesday, March 4
1	Akron	67
6	Tennessee Tech	58
4	Murray State	81
2	Middle Tennessee	85

Championship; Thursday, March 5
1	Akron	68
2	Middle Tennessee	63
