= 1924 St. Xavier Saints football team =

American college football season

1924 St. Xavier Saints football
- Conference: Ohio Athletic Conference
- Record: 2–5–1 (1–1–1 OAC)
- Head coach: Joseph A. Meyer (5th season)
- Home stadium: Corcoran Field

1924 Ohio Athletic Conference football standings
	Conf.					Overall
Team	W		L		T	W		L		T
Oberlin $	8	–	0	–	0	8	–	0	–	0
Wittenberg	6	–	1	–	0	7	–	1	–	0
Ohio Wesleyan	4	–	1	–	0	7	–	2	–	0
Case	6	–	2	–	1	6	–	2	–	1
Wooster	5	–	2	–	1	6	–	2	–	2
Akron	3	–	2	–	0	5	–	3	–	0
Western Reserve	3	–	2	–	2	5	–	2	–	2
Heidelberg	3	–	2	–	2	3	–	3	–	2
Mount Union	4	–	3	–	1	5	–	4	–	1
Ohio Northern	3	–	3	–	1	4	–	3	–	1
St. Xavier	1	–	1	–	1	2	–	5	–	1
Kenyon	3	–	4	–	1	4	–	4	–	1
Denison	3	–	4	–	0	3	–	4	–	1
Ohio	2	–	4	–	0	4	–	4	–	0
Otterbein	2	–	5	–	0	2	–	5	–	0
Muskingum	2	–	5	–	0	2	–	6	–	0
Cincinnati	1	–	4	–	0	2	–	6	–	1
Baldwin–Wallace	1	–	4	–	0	1	–	7	–	0
Miami (OH)	1	–	5	–	0	2	–	6	–	0
Hiram	0	–	7	–	0	1	–	7	–	0
$ – Conference champion

The 1924 St. Xavier Saints football team was an American football team that represented St. Xavier College (now known as Xavier University) as a member of the Ohio Athletic Conference (OAC) during the 1924 college football season. In their fifth year under head coach Joseph A. Meyer, the Saints compiled a 2–5–1 record.

== Schedule ==
Date	Opponent	Site	Result	Source
October 4	Transylvania*	Corcoran Field; Cincinnati, OH	L 7–13	
October 18	at Wittenberg	Springfield, OH	L 7–32	
October 25	Maryville (TN)*	Corcoran Field; Cincinnati, OH	L 6–26	
November 1	at Saint Louis*	St. Louis University Athletic Field; St. Louis, MO	L 7–18	
November 8	Kenyon	Corcoran Field; Cincinnati, OH	T 7–7	
November 15	Western Kentucky State Normal*	Corcoran Field; Cincinnati, OH	W 29–0	
November 22	Otterbein	Corcoran Field; Cincinnati, OH	W 48–0	
November 27	Haskell*	Corcoran Field; Cincinnati, OH	L 6–47	
*Non-conference game
