= 1924 Miami Redskins football team =

American college football season

1924 Miami Redskins football
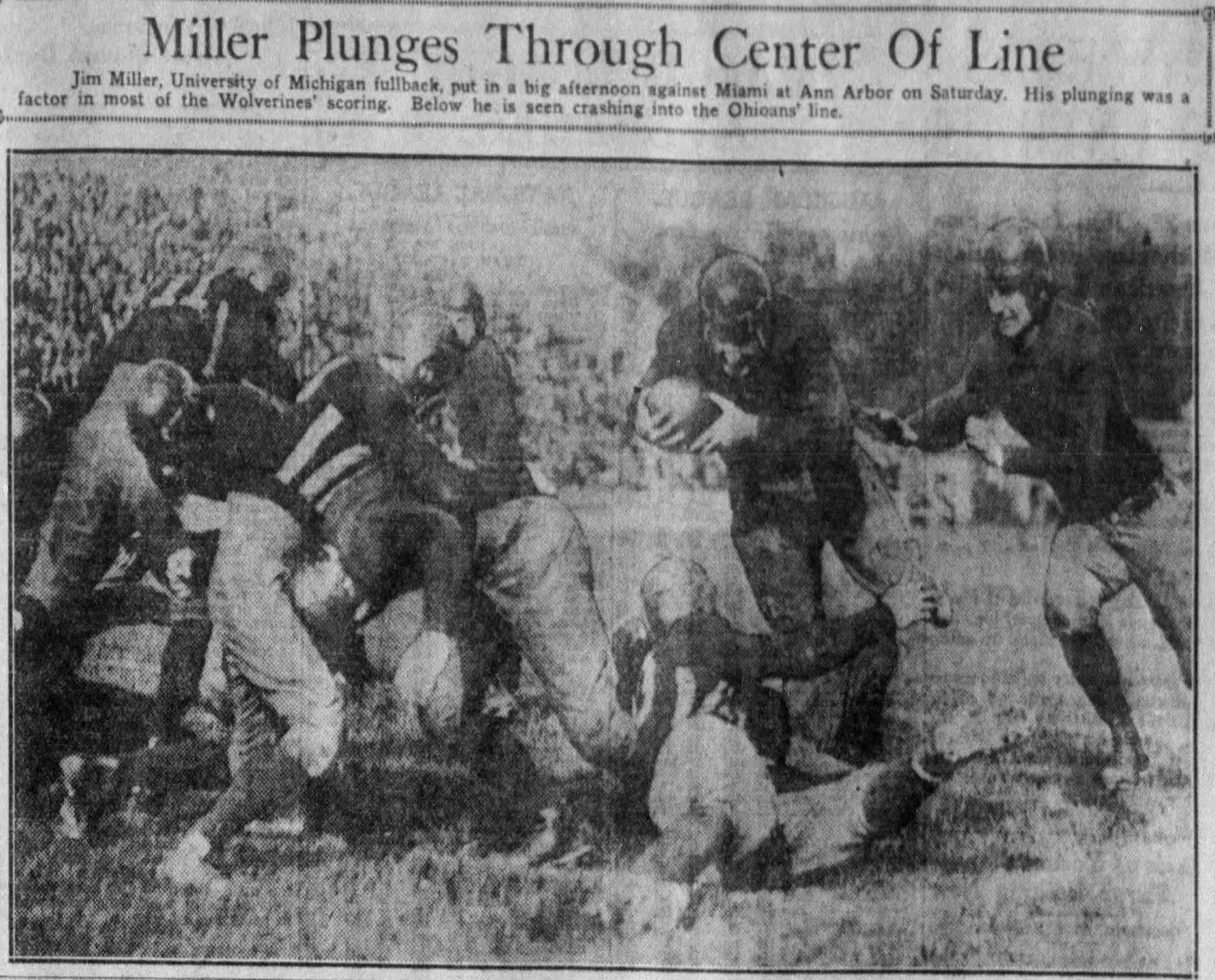
- Conference: Ohio Athletic Conference
- Record: 2–6 (1–5 OAC)
- Head coach: Chester Pittser (1st season)
- Home stadium: Miami Field

1924 Ohio Athletic Conference football standings
	Conf.					Overall
Team	W		L		T	W		L		T
Oberlin $	8	–	0	–	0	8	–	0	–	0
Wittenberg	6	–	1	–	0	7	–	1	–	0
Ohio Wesleyan	4	–	1	–	0	7	–	2	–	0
Case	6	–	2	–	1	6	–	2	–	1
Wooster	5	–	2	–	1	6	–	2	–	2
Akron	3	–	2	–	0	5	–	3	–	0
Western Reserve	3	–	2	–	2	5	–	2	–	2
Heidelberg	3	–	2	–	2	3	–	3	–	2
Mount Union	4	–	3	–	1	5	–	4	–	1
Ohio Northern	3	–	3	–	1	4	–	3	–	1
St. Xavier	1	–	1	–	1	2	–	5	–	1
Kenyon	3	–	4	–	1	4	–	4	–	1
Denison	3	–	4	–	0	3	–	4	–	1
Ohio	2	–	4	–	0	4	–	4	–	0
Otterbein	2	–	5	–	0	2	–	5	–	0
Muskingum	2	–	5	–	0	2	–	6	–	0
Cincinnati	1	–	4	–	0	2	–	6	–	1
Baldwin–Wallace	1	–	4	–	0	1	–	7	–	0
Miami (OH)	1	–	5	–	0	2	–	6	–	0
Hiram	0	–	7	–	0	1	–	7	–	0
$ – Conference champion

The 1924 Miami Redskins football team was an American football team that represented Miami University as a member of the Ohio Athletic Conference (OAC) during the 1924 college football season. In its first season under head coach Chester Pittser, Miami compiled a 2–6 record (1–5 against conference opponents) and finished in 19th place out of 20 teams in the OAC.

== Schedule ==
Date	Opponent	Site	Result	Source
September 27	Georgetown (KY)*	Miami Field; Oxford, OH	W 7–0	
October 4	at Michigan*	Ferry Field; Ann Arbor, MI	L 0–55	
October 11	Mount Union	Miami Field; Oxford, OH	L 6–15	
October 18	Wooster	Miami Field; Oxford, OH	L 6–20	
November 1	vs. Denison	University of Dayton Stadium; Dayton, OH	W 13–12	
November 8	Western Reserve	Miami Field; Oxford, OH	L 21–24	
November 15	at Oberlin	Oberlin, OH	L 2–13	
November 27	at Cincinnati	Nippert Stadium; Cincinnati, OH (Victory Bell)	L 7–8	
*Non-conference game
