= Alan H. Coogan =

Alan Hall Coogan is a former professor of geology at Kent State University. He received his M.A. in paleontology from the University of California, Berkeley in 1957. Coogan received his Ph.D. from the University of Illinois, Urbana in geology in 1962. He then went on to receive his J.D. from the University of Akron in 1977. He died July 28, 2023, at his home in Kent, Ohio.

Coogan was a geology professor at Kent State University from 1967 until his retirement in 1999. His main expertise is in petroleum geology of the Appalachian Basin.

== Professional papers and presentations ==
- Coogan, Alan H. “A fault-related model for the facies of the Lower Silurian Clinton Sandstone interval in the subsurface of eastern Ohio.” Northeastern Geology, v. 13 issue 2, 1991, p. 110-129.
- Coogan, Alan H. “Subsurface Siluro-Devonian carbonate interval (Bass Islands-Columbus/Onondaga and Oriskany) in Ohio.” AAPG Bulletin, v. 80 issue 9, 1996, p. 1521.
- Coogan, Alan H.; Hackathorn, Merrianne, editor. “Ohio's surface rocks and sediments.” Bulletin - Ohio, Division of Geological Survey, 1996, p. 31-50.
- Coogan, Alan H.; Lesser, Gustavo. “Appalachian basin-edge, fault-related sequence terminations.” Abstracts with Programs - Geological Society of America, v. 23 issue 5, 1991, p. 346.
- Coogan, Alan H.; Parker, Marilyn M. “Six potential trapping plays in Ordovician Trenton Limestone, Northwestern Ohio.” Oil and Gas Journal, v. 82 issue 48, 1984, p. 121-126.
- Coogan, Alan H.; Peng, Shengfeng. “Depositional and subrosional Salina halite-bed terminations in northeastern Ohio are structurally controlled.” Abstracts with Programs - Geological Society of America, v. 26 issue 5, 1994, p. 10.
- Coogan, Alan H.; Peng, Shengfeng. “Sauk Sequence wedge; structural and depositional setting for Knox and older petroleum reservoirs in Ohio.” Northeastern Geology, v. 16 issue 3-4, 1994, p. 221-230
- Coogan, Alan H.; Worstall, Robert S. “Silurian Clinton shoestring channel sandstones in Ohio.” Compass, v. 68 issue 1, 1990, p. 4-12.
- Coogan, Alan; Palmer, Donald F. “The effects of short term climate change in engineering geology.” Annual Meeting - Association of Engineering Geologists, v. 34, 1991, p. 548.
- Farmerie, Randy L.; Coogan, Alan H. “Silurian Salina salt strata terminations in northeastern Ohio.” Northeastern Geology, v. 17 issue 4, 1995, p. 383-393.
- Lesser, Gustavo; Coogan, Alan H. “Structural effects on Cambrian-Early Ordovician paleotopography in east-central Ohio.” Northeastern Geology, v. 15 issue 1, 1993, p. 62-77.
- Peng, Shengfeng; Coogan, Alan H. “LOGCAL; a new tool to analyze the geophysical logs.” AAPG Bulletin, v. 79 issue 9, 1995, p. 1417.
- Schultz, Troy; Coogan, Alan H. “Indoor air risk assessment of BTEX volatilization from ground water to indoor air.” Abstracts with Programs - Geological Society of America, v. 30 issue 2, 1998, p. 70.

== Awards ==
In 1987, Coogan received the Outstanding Educator award from the American Association of Petroleum Geologists.

In 1994, Coogan received the John T. Galey Memorial Award from the American Association of Petroleum Geologists.
