= 1924 Ohio Green and White football team =

American college football season

1924 Ohio Green and White football
- Conference: Ohio Athletic Conference
- Record: 4–4 (2–4 OAC)
- Head coach: Don Peden (1st season)
- Captain: Barrett

1924 Ohio Athletic Conference football standings
	Conf.					Overall
Team	W		L		T	W		L		T
Oberlin $	8	–	0	–	0	8	–	0	–	0
Wittenberg	6	–	1	–	0	7	–	1	–	0
Ohio Wesleyan	4	–	1	–	0	7	–	2	–	0
Case	6	–	2	–	1	6	–	2	–	1
Wooster	5	–	2	–	1	6	–	2	–	2
Akron	3	–	2	–	0	5	–	3	–	0
Western Reserve	3	–	2	–	2	5	–	2	–	2
Heidelberg	3	–	2	–	2	3	–	3	–	2
Mount Union	4	–	3	–	1	5	–	4	–	1
Ohio Northern	3	–	3	–	1	4	–	3	–	1
St. Xavier	1	–	1	–	1	2	–	5	–	1
Kenyon	3	–	4	–	1	4	–	4	–	1
Denison	3	–	4	–	0	3	–	4	–	1
Ohio	2	–	4	–	0	4	–	4	–	0
Otterbein	2	–	5	–	0	2	–	5	–	0
Muskingum	2	–	5	–	0	2	–	6	–	0
Cincinnati	1	–	4	–	0	2	–	6	–	1
Baldwin–Wallace	1	–	4	–	0	1	–	7	–	0
Miami (OH)	1	–	5	–	0	2	–	6	–	0
Hiram	0	–	7	–	0	1	–	7	–	0
$ – Conference champion

The 1924 Ohio Green and White football team was an American football team that represented Ohio University in the Ohio Athletic Conference (OAC) during the 1924 college football season. The team compiled a 4–4 record (2–4 against conference opponents), finished in 14th place out of 20 teams in the OAC, and outscored opponents by a total of 64 to 59.

In January 1924, Don Peden was hired as the head football coach at Ohio University. He had been an assistant coach at the school in 1923 and took over from John C. Heldt. He continued as head coach for at Ohio University through the 1946 season, compiling a record of 121–46–11.

== Schedule ==
Date	Opponent	Site	Result	Attendance	Source
September 27	Rio Grande	Athens, OH	W 10–0		
October 4	at Wittenberg	Springfield, OH	L 0–3		
October 11	Oberlin	Athens, OH	L 7–13		
October 24	Kenyon	Athens, OH	W 6–0		
November 1	Ohio Northern	Athens, OH	L 7–12		
November 8	at Marietta	Marietta, OH	W 21–17		
November 15	Denison	Athens, OH	L 7–14		
November 22	at Ohio Wesleyan	Delaware, OH	W 6–0		
