= Summit Management Services =

Summit Management Services, Inc.
- Company type: Private
- Industry: Property
- Founded: 1980
- Founder: Herbert Newman
- Headquarters: Akron, Ohio, United States
- Areas served: Ohio; Colorado; North Carolina; Missouri
- Key people: Edward Newman
- Services: Property management
- Number of employees: 120
- Website: summitmanagementliving.com

Summit Management Services, Inc is an American property management company based in Akron, Ohio.

== History ==
Summit Management Services, Inc (“SMSI”) was founded in 1980, though its genesis was actually in 1979 when the founder, Herbert Newman, began purchasing, renovating and operating over 15 properties in SMSI's original submarket of Akron. The company was initially founded for the management of Section 8 subsidized housing, most of which was financed with FHA-insured loans (i.e., 221 (d)( 4), 223(f), and 236). However, since then, the focus has been on high-end, luxury apartments in suitable neighborhoods as well as managing 221(d)(4) and 223(f) market rent projects.

Herbert Newman, born and raised in Akron, Ohio, started his career from Northeast Ohio after graduating from Ohio State University and receiving a Juris Doctor from the University of Akron School of Law.

After his law practice, Newman served as director of Akron Metropolitan Housing Authority for five years. As a part of this organization, Newman introduced the use of tax-free financing for the development of subsidized housing. This was done by using revenue bonds sold under Federal Housing Regulation 811(b), which was also partially authored by Newman. Before founding the company, Newman wrote many of the laws that govern HUD/FHA financing. These lead to the development of housing during the late 1970s and early 1980s. This knowledge was then imparted to Summit MultiCapital to obtain favorable debt financing through FHA/Fannie Mae, Freddie Mac and other financial institutions.

Summit Management Services, Inc. now employs 120 full-time staff and Newman remains the majority stockholder. The company currently manages over 4,000 multifamily units comprising mostly class "A" and student apartments. These are all owned by Newman and related entities.
