= David Drabold =

American physicist

David Alan Drabold (born 13 February 1960) is an American physicist, currently Edwin and Ruth Kennedy Distinguished Professor at Ohio University.

== Early life ==
Born in Akron, Ohio to Walter Drabold Jr. and Marjorie Jane Ruthenberg. Drabold was raised in Cuyahoga Falls, Ohio.

== Education ==
Drabold received a B.S. in Applied Mathematics from the University of Akron in 1982, and a PhD. in Physics from Washington University in St. Louis under the supervision of Peter Fedders. He was also significantly influenced by E. T. Jaynes. He held term appointments in Physics at the University of Notre Dame, where his key mentor was Otto F. Sankey and both Materials Science and Engineering and Physics at the University of Illinois at Urbana-Champaign, where his key mentor was Richard M. Martin.

== Research ==
Drabold took a tenure track appointment at Ohio University in 1993. He is a theoretical physicist working primarily in condensed matter physics, materials science, and computational physics with an emphasis on amorphous, paracrystalline and glassy materials, including more than 100 works involving amorphous silicon.

He is known for elucidating the consequences of structural or thermal disorder for electronic, optical and transport properties. His published research includes about 300 works. He is a Fellow of the American Physical Society (in the Division of Materials Physics in 2003), (citation: For fundamental contributions to the physics of non-crystalline materials and development of efficient first-principles electronic structure methods) a Fellow of the Institute of Physics and Fellow of the Royal Numismatic Society. He has mentored 22 Ph.D. students to date. A Festschrift volume was published commemorating his sixtieth birthday.

Drabold has made contributions to the electronic structure of disordered materials by direct computation of band tail states and Anderson transition for realistic models of materials, generalized Wannier functions from projection, and the atomistic origin of Urbach tails. He has also emphasized the importance of the electron-phonon coupling for localized and partly localized states. Drabold, Fedders and others also published quantum simulations of photodegradation (Staebler-Wronski effect) in hydrogenated amorphous silicon. He has also published several papers on doping of amorphous phases of carbon and silicon.

Drabold has introduced several useful methods, among them a maximum entropy technique for linear scaling computation of electronic structure and total energies most recently applied to a system with over 2 million atoms. Techniques for real space decomposition of the electrical and thermal conductivities based on Kubo formulae have also appeared.

He has been Visiting Fellow Commoner in Trinity College, Cambridge, and is a life member of Clare Hall, Cambridge. He was Leverhulme Visiting Professor of Chemistry at the University of Cambridge in 2008.

== Selected publications ==
Origins of structural and electronic transitions in disordered silicon

Signatures of paracrystallinity in amorphous silicon from machine-learning-driven molecular dynamics

Maximum entropy approach for linear scaling in the electronic structure problem

Unconstrained minimization approach for electronic computations that scales linearly with system size

Order-𝑁 projection method for first-principles computations of electronic quantities and Wannier functions

Energetics of Large Fullerenes: Balls, Tubes, and Capsules

Ab Initio Simulation of Amorphous Graphite

Theory of Defects in Semiconductors (with S. K. Estreicher), Springer (2007).
