= Charles E. Fleming =

American judge (born 1962)

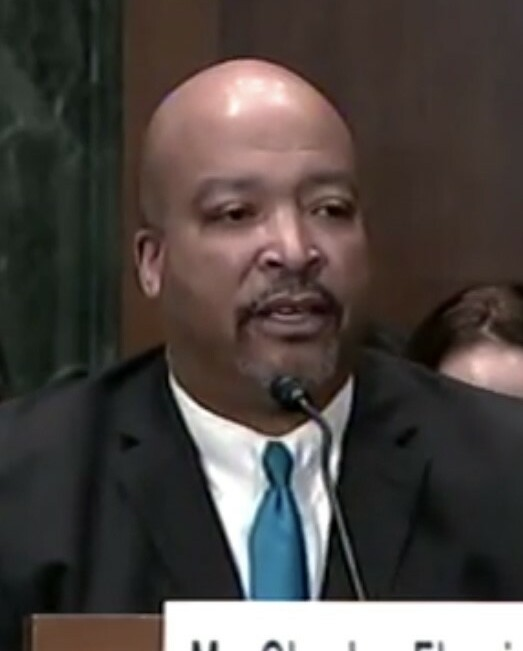

Judge of the United States District Court for the Northern District of Ohio
- Incumbent
- Assumed office February 8, 2022
- Appointed by: Joe Biden
- Preceded by: James S. Gwin

Personal details
- Born: Charles Esque Fleming; 1962 (age 63–64) Cleveland, Ohio, U.S.
- Education: Kent State University (BA); Case Western Reserve University (JD)

Charles Esque Fleming (born 1962) is an American lawyer and judge from Ohio who is a United States district judge of the United States District Court for the Northern District of Ohio.

== Education ==
Fleming received a Bachelor of Arts from Kent State University in 1986 and a Juris Doctor from Case Western Reserve University Law School in 1990.

== Career ==
From 1990 to 1991, Fleming was an associate at Forbes, Forbes & Associates in Cleveland. From 1991 to 2022, he served as the assistant federal public defender in the office of the federal public defender for the Northern District of Ohio in Cleveland. From 2010 to 2016 he was the investigative and paralegal staff supervisor for the public defender's office as well as the Cleveland trial team supervisor from 2016 to 2021.

=== Federal judicial service ===
On September 30, 2021, President Joe Biden nominated Fleming to serve as a United States district judge of the United States District Court for the Northern District of Ohio. President Biden nominated Fleming to the seat vacated by Judge James S. Gwin, who assumed senior status on January 31, 2021. On November 17, 2021, a hearing on his nomination was held before the Senate Judiciary Committee. During his confirmation hearing, Fleming was questioned by Republican senators over the clients that he represented during his tenure as an assistant federal public defender, who included individuals charged with child pornography and impregnating a child. On December 16, 2021, his nomination was reported out of committee by a 13–9 vote. On January 3, 2022, his nomination was returned to the President under Rule XXXI, Paragraph 6 of the United States Senate; he was renominated the same day.

On January 13, 2022, his nomination was reported out of committee by a 13–9 vote. On February 1, 2022, the Senate invoked cloture on his nomination by a 55–41 vote. Later that day, his nomination was confirmed by a 56–42 vote. He received his judicial commission on February 8, 2022. He was sworn in on March 11, 2022. Fleming became the second active African-American judge on the court.

== See also ==
- List of African-American federal judges
- List of African-American jurists

Legal offices
Preceded by James S. Gwin	Judge of the United States District Court for the Northern District of Ohio; 2022–present	Incumbent
