= Bob Rupert =

American basketball coach

Playing career
- 1949–1953: Ohio Northern

Coaching career (HC unless noted)
- 1977–1980: Baldwin–Wallace
- 1980–1984: Akron

Accomplishments and honors

Awards
- OAC Coach of the Year (1979)

Bob Rupert (born c. 1931) is a former college basketball head coach. He coached the Akron Zips men's basketball team from 1981 to 1984. In four seasons, he guided the Zips to a 37-71 record.
