= Tony Laterza =

American basketball coach

Playing career

Football
- 1949–1950: Akron

Basketball
- 1950–1951: Akron

Coaching career (HC unless noted)

Basketball
- 1960–1968: Akron

J. Anthony Laterza was the Akron Zips men's basketball head coach from 1960 to 1968. In nine seasons, he guided the team to a 178–59 record. Laterza's winning percentage of .751 remains the best in the history of the program. Under Laterza, the Zips won three Ohio Athletic Conference tournament championships. His teams also made the Division II national tournament Final Four twice (1964 and 1966) and reached the championship game in 1964.

Laterza was succeeded at the University of Akron by Wyatt Webb. Starting in 1981, he was head basketball coach at Southwest High in Miami, Florida, for two seasons. In 1985, he took over as head coach at Ransom-Everglades High.

During his own high school career, Laterza was selected for the All-Ohio basketball team in 1946.
