= 1985–86 Akron Zips men's basketball team =

American college basketball season

1985–86 Akron Zips men's basketball

OVC tournament champions OVC Regular season co-champions

NCAA tournament, First Round
- Conference: Mid-American Conference
- Record: 22–8 (10–4 MAC)
- Head coach: Bob Huggins (2nd season)
- Assistant coach: Coleman Crawford (3rd season)
- Home arena: James A. Rhodes Arena

1985–86 Ohio Valley Conference men's basketball standings
	Conf.				Overall
Team	W		L	PCT	W		L	PCT
Akron †	10	–	4	.714	22	–	8	.733
Middle Tennessee	10	–	4	.714	23	–	11	.676
Murray State	8	–	6	.571	17	–	12	.586
Austin Peay	8	–	6	.571	14	–	14	.500
Youngstown State	8	–	6	.571	14	–	15	.483
Tennessee Tech	6	–	8	.429	14	–	15	.483
Eastern Kentucky	5	–	9	.357	10	–	18	.357
Morehead State	1	–	13	.071	8	–	19	.296
† 1986 OVC tournament winner Rankings from AP Poll

The 1985–86 Akron Zips men's basketball team represented the University of Akron during the 1985–86 NCAA Division I men's basketball season. The Zips, led by second-year head coach Bob Huggins, played their home games at the James A. Rhodes Arena in Akron, Ohio as members of the Ohio Valley Conference. They finished the season 22–8, 10–4 in OVC play to finish in first place. They defeated Austin Peay, Tennessee Tech, and Middle Tennessee State to win the OVC tournament. The Zips received the conference’s automatic bid to the NCAA tournament. As the No. 15 seed in the Midwest Region, they lost in the first round to Michigan.

== Roster ==
1985–86 Akron Zips men's basketball team
Players	Coaches
Pos. / # / Name / Height / Weight / Year / Previous school / Hometown; F / / Marcel Boyce / 6 ft 6 in (1.98 m) / — / Sr	Head coach: Bob Huggins (West Virginia); Assistant coach(es): Coleman Crawford (North Alabama); Legend: (C) Team captain; (S) Suspended; (I) Ineligible; (W) Walk-on; Injured; Current redshirt; Roster

== Schedule and results ==
Date time, TV	Rank^{#}	Opponent^{#}	Result	Record	Site (attendance) city, state
Non-conference regular season
Nov 26, 1985*		Davis & Elkins	W 93–70	1–0	James A. Rhodes Arena (1,766); Akron, Ohio
Nov 30, 1985*		at Bowling Green State	W 90–85	2–0	Anderson Arena (1,911); Bowling Green, Ohio
Dec 5, 1985*		at Ohio State	L 73–91	2–1	St. John Arena (10,998); Columbus, Ohio
Dec 7, 1985*		at Kent State	L 60–66	2–2	Memorial Athletic and Convocation Center (4,617); Kent, Ohio
Dec 10, 1985*		at Cleveland State	L 76–88	2–3	Woodling Gym (1,727); Cleveland, Ohio
Dec 14, 1985*		Maryland-Eastern Shore	W 84–56	3–3	James A. Rhodes Arena (1,592); Akron, Ohio
Dec 21, 1985*		Hiram	W 102–59	4–3	James A. Rhodes Arena (1,475); Akron, Ohio
Dec 28, 1985*		Morgan State	W 79–56	5–3	James A. Rhodes Arena (1,241); Akron, Ohio
Dec 30, 1985*		Ashland	W 84–58	6–3	James A. Rhodes Arena (1,356); Akron, Ohio
OVC regular season
Jan 4, 1986		at Youngstown State	W 64–62	7–3 (1–0)	Beeghly Center (5,807); Youngstown, Ohio
Jan 11, 1986		Eastern Kentucky	W 63–55	8–3 (2–0)	James A. Rhodes Arena (2,217); Akron, Ohio
Jan 13, 1986		Morehead State	W 85–75	9–3 (3–0)	James A. Rhodes Arena (1,486); Akron, Ohio
Jan 16, 1986*		at UNC Wilmington	W 82–73	10–3	Trask Coliseum (1,920); Wilmington, North Carolina
Jan 18, 1986		at Austin Peay	W 77–67	11–3 (4–0)	Winfield Dunn Center (4,153); Clarksville, Tennessee
Jan 20, 1986		at Murray State	L 77–83	11–4 (4–1)	Racer Arena (4,000); Murray, Kentucky
Jan 22, 1986*		Urbana	W 117–79	12–4	James A. Rhodes Arena (2,108); Akron, Ohio
Jan 25, 1986		at Tennessee Tech	W 64–54	13–4 (5–1)	Eblen Center (5,187); Cookeville, Tennessee
Jan 27, 1986		at Middle Tennessee	L 78–86	13–5 (5–2)	Murphy Center (4,000); Murfreesboro, Tennessee
Jan 29, 1986*		at UCF	W 81–70	14–5	Education Gymnasium (212); Orlando, Florida
Feb 1, 1986		Youngstown State	L 62–65	14–6 (5–3)	James A. Rhodes Arena (5,552); Akron, Ohio
Feb 3, 1986*		at Detroit Mercy	W 53–51	15–6	Calihan Hall (1,843); Detroit, Michigan
Feb 8, 1986		Middle Tennessee	W 72–70	16–6 (6–3)	James A. Rhodes Arena (5,023); Akron, Ohio
Feb 10, 1986		Tennessee Tech	W 79–69	17–6 (7–3)	James A. Rhodes Arena (3,358); Akron, Ohio
Feb 15, 1986		at Morehead State	W 67–64	18–6 (8–3)	Ellis Johnson Arena (2,000); Morehead, Kentucky
Feb 17, 1986		at Eastern Kentucky	L 64–84	18–7 (8–4)	Alumni Coliseum (1,900); Richmond, Kentucky
Feb 22, 1986		Murray State	W 76–57	19–7 (9–4)	James A. Rhodes Arena (7,131); Akron, Ohio
Feb 24, 1986		Austin Peay	W 84–72	20–7 (10–4)	James A. Rhodes Arena (5,511); Akron, Ohio
OVC tournament
Mar 4, 1986*		Tennessee Tech; Semifinals	W 67–58	21–7	James A. Rhodes Arena (5,582); Akron, Ohio
Mar 5, 1986*		Middle Tennessee; Championship game	W 68–63	22–7	James A. Rhodes Arena (6,701); Akron, Ohio
NCAA tournament
Mar 14, 1986*	(15 MW)	vs. (2 MW) No. 5 Michigan; First Round	L 64–70	22–8	Hubert H. Humphrey Metrodome (27,454); Minneapolis, Minnesota
*Non-conference game. ^{#}Rankings from AP Poll. (#) Tournament seedings in parentheses. MW=Midwest. All times are in Eastern Time.
