= William L. Hughes =

American football player and coach

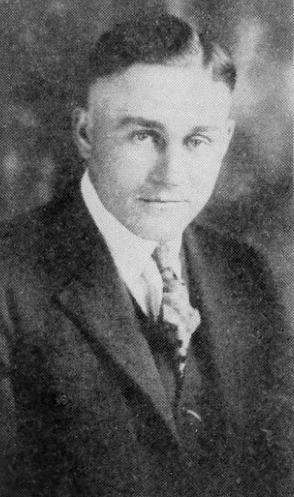

Biographical details
- Born: January 30, 1895; Edgar, Nebraska, U.S.
- Died: February 20, 1957 (aged 62); Washington, D.C., U.S.

Playing career
- 1914–1916: Nebraska Wesleyan

Coaching career (HC unless noted)
- 1924: Oberlin
- 1925–1929: DePauw

Administrative career (AD unless noted)
- 1925–1930: DePauw

William Leonard Hughes (January 30, 1895 – February 20, 1957) was an American college football player and coach. He was the head football coach at Oberlin College in Oberlin, Ohio in 1924 and DePauw University from 1925 to 1929.

Hughes died on February 20, 1957, in Washington, D.C..
