= Otto F. Sankey =

American physicist (1951–2020)

Otto Francis Sankey (11 January 1951 – 21 March 2020.) was an American physicist. He was Regents Professor at Arizona State University and a Fellow of the American Physical Society (elected in 2000).

== Education ==
Sankey received a B.S. in physics from the University of Missouri–St. Louis, and a PhD. in physics from Washington University in St. Louis under the supervision of Peter A. Fedders. After a postdoctoral appointment at the University of Illinois Urbana-Champaign, he spent the rest of his career at Arizona State University.

== Career ==
Sankey made important contributions to condensed matter theory, the most notable of which is the computer code FIREBALL, which enabled accurate and efficient simulation of complex materials. FIREBALL used local pseudoatomic orbitals as the basis set to solve the Kohn-Sham equations, which offered significant efficiencies in both computer memory and CPU use. The method has been generalized and extended into a number of DFT tight binding approaches and was a forerunner to the SIESTA program, particularly in its use of Sankey's compactly localized "fireball" orbitals.

After his retirement, Sankey developed an interest in oncology and particularly the treatment of prostate cancer. He published the book Trouble with the Man Gland to explain the science of the disease and its treatment.

Among many other original ideas, Sankey proposed a means of killing viruses through laser irradiation, essentially by exploding the capsid from a resonant coupling to the laser.

His career was recognized by a Festschrift collection published in the journal Physica Status Solidi B. These papers included a Dedication in his honor and 13 scholarly papers contributed by peers celebrating his scientific achievements.

== Death ==
Sankey died of cancer in March 2020 at the age of 69. He is survived by his wife, Debbie; three daughters; and several grandchildren.
