= Nate Barnett =

American basketball player (born 1953)

Personal information
- Born: January 29, 1953 (age 73) Ibadan, Nigeria
- Listed height: 6 ft 3 in (1.91 m)
- Listed weight: 175 lb (79 kg)

Career information
- High school: Mergenthaler Vocational-Technical (Baltimore, Maryland)
- College: Akron (1972–1975)
- NBA draft: 1975: 7th round, 119th overall pick
- Drafted by: Houston Rockets
- Position: Point guard
- Number: 22

Career history
- 1975–1976: Indiana Pacers
- 1979–1980: Anchorage Northern Knights
- Stats at Basketball Reference

Nathaniel Barnett Jr. (born January 29, 1953) is an American retired basketball player. He played collegiately for the University of Akron and was selected by the Houston Rockets in the 7th round (119th pick overall) of the 1975 NBA draft. Later, he played for the Indiana Pacers (1975–76) in the ABA.

Barnett played for the Anchorage Northern Knights of the Continental Basketball Association during the 1979–80 season.
