= Earl Williams (basketball coach) =

American basketball coach

Coaching career (HC unless noted)
- 1905–1908: Akron

Earl Williams was an American basketball coach. He was the first Akron Zips men's basketball head coach. In four seasons (1905 to 1908), he guided the team to a 23-20 record.
