= Joe Jakubick =

American basketball player and coach

Personal information
- Listed height: 6 ft 5 in (1.96 m)

Career information
- High school: Madison (Mansfield, Ohio)
- College: Akron (1980–1984)
- NBA draft: 1984: 7th round, 142nd overall pick
- Drafted by: Cleveland Cavaliers
- Position: Shooting guard
- Number: 31

Career highlights
- 3× AP honorable mention All-American (1982–1984); NCAA scoring champion (1984); 2× OVC Player of the Year (1983, 1984)
- Stats at Basketball Reference

Joe Jakubick is an American former basketball player and former high school basketball coach. Jakubick was an All-American player at the University of Akron and led the nation in scoring in the 1983–84 NCAA Division I men's basketball season.

Jakubick, a 6'5 guard, attended Madison High School, then signed with the nearby University of Akron. At Akron from 1980 to 1984, Jakubick became one of the top scorers in the nation. He scored 2,583 points in his four-year career, and led the nation in scoring in his senior year, averaging 30.1 points per game. Jakubick was named the Ohio Valley Conference Player of the Year twice, in 1983 and 1984, and was an honorable mention All-American both years. He graduated as Akron's all-time leading scorer, a status he still holds, and left Akron holding most school scoring records.

After his college career was over, Jakubick was selected in the seventh round of the 1984 NBA draft by the Cleveland Cavaliers, but never played in the NBA. He played for Marathon Oil following his graduation from Akron, playing exhibition games against NCAA teams. He resigned as the girls' basketball coach at St. Vincent – St. Mary High School., and was hired as the boys basketball coach at St. Peter's High School., in his hometown of Mansfield, Ohio, where he led the program until 2020.

== See also ==
- List of NCAA Division I men's basketball season scoring leaders
