= Marco Laterza =

Swiss fitness model

Marco Laterza is a Swiss fitness model and bodybuilder. He is known for modelling and appearing in covers of various fitness magazines.

== Early life and career ==
Laterza is based in Urdorf, Switzerland. Marco was a young gymnast until suffering a knee injury during a training session at the age of 16. Before commencing his career as a fitness model, Laterza had only appeared as a child in some local hairstyle photoshoots. He was first noted as a potential fitness model at Fitness and Sports fair in Cologne in 2013. He has been elected for cover page shoots in fitness journals like Men's Health, Muscle and Fitness, Fitness Mag, Menz Physique, Hot Physique, Olympian's, Kettlebell Mag, Welt Vegan, and Muscle & Performance. Laterza is an advocate for plant-based diets and regimens, particularly after suffering from Lymphocytic colitis in 2017.
