= AAPG Bulletin =

- Discipline: Geosciences
- Language: English
- Edited by: Matthew J. Pranter

Publication details
- Former name(s): The American Association of Petroleum Geologists Bulletin (1967-1974, ISSN 0002-7464); Bulletin of the American Association of Petroleum Geologists (1918-1967, ISSN 0883-9247); Bulletin of the Southwestern Association of Petroleum Geologists (1917-1918)
- History: 1917-present
- Publisher: American Association of Petroleum Geologists (United States)
- Frequency: Monthly
- Impact factor: 2.5 (2024)

Standard abbreviations
- ISO 4: AAPG Bull.

Indexing
- CODEN: AABUD2
- ISSN: 0149-1423 (print); 1558-9153 (web)

Links
- Journal homepage

The AAPG Bulletin is a monthly peer-reviewed scientific journal covering geosciences and associated technologies relating to the energy industry. It is an official journal of the American Association of Petroleum Geologists. The current editor-in-chief is Matthew J. Pranter (University of Oklahoma).

== Abstracting and indexing ==
This journal is abstracted and/or indexed in: GeoRef, GEOBASE, Scopus, PubMed, Current Contents, and Web of Science.
