= Russell Beichly =

American basketball coach (1902–1996)

Biographical details
- Born: October 27, 1902
- Died: April 20, 1996 (aged 93)

Coaching career (HC unless noted)

Basketball
- 1941–1959: Akron

Baseball
- 1947–1959: Akron

Administrative career (AD unless noted)
- 1946–1958: Akron

Head coaching record
- Overall: 288–144 (basketball); 101–62–1 (baseball)

Russell J. Beichly (October 27, 1902 – April 20, 1996) was the Akron Zips men's basketball head coach from 1941 to 1959. In 19 seasons, he guided the team to a 288–144 record. Beichly was named Columbus Dispatch Ohio College Basketball Coach of the Year in 1959, following a 21–2 season. A Wittenberg University graduate, Beichly coached Akron West High School to five straight OHSAA state tournament appearances (1931–1935), including a state championship in 1932.
