= James S. Gwin =

American judge (born 1954)

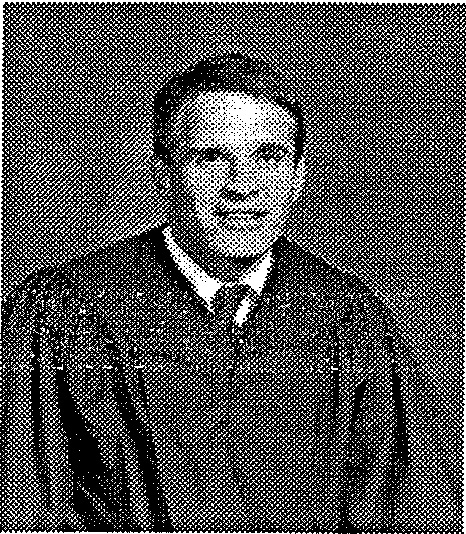

Senior Judge of the United States District Court for the Northern District of Ohio
- Incumbent
- Assumed office January 31, 2021

Judge of the United States District Court for the Northern District of Ohio
- In office November 7, 1997 – January 31, 2021
- Appointed by: Bill Clinton
- Preceded by: Sam H. Bell
- Succeeded by: Charles E. Fleming

Personal details
- Born: August 10, 1954 (age 71) Canton, Ohio, U.S.
- Education: Kenyon College (AB); University of Akron School of Law (JD)

James Steven Gwin (born August 10, 1954) is a senior United States district judge of the United States District Court for the Northern District of Ohio.

== Education and career ==
Born in Canton, Ohio in 1954, Gwin graduated from St. Thomas Aquinas High School in Louisville, Ohio, and received an Artium Baccalaureus degree from Kenyon College in 1976 and a Juris Doctor from the University of Akron School of Law in 1979. He was in private practice in Canton from 1979 to 1989. He was a judge on the Stark County Common Pleas Court from 1989 to 1997.

== Federal judicial service ==
Gwin was nominated by President Bill Clinton on July 31, 1997, to a seat on the United States District Court for the Northern District of Ohio vacated by Sam H. Bell. He was confirmed by the United States Senate on November 5, 1997, and received his commission on November 7, 1997. He assumed senior status on January 31, 2021 and inactive senior status on September 20, 2024.

== Sources ==
Legal offices
Preceded by Sam H. Bell	Judge of the United States District Court for the Northern District of Ohio; 1997–2021	Succeeded by Charles E. Fleming
