= James W. Coleman =

American football, basketball, and track coach

Biographical details
- Born: October 27, 1894; Strong, Arkansas, U.S.
- Died: May 20, 1993 (aged 98); Reno, Nevada, U.S.

Playing career

Football
- 1916–1919: Arkansas
- Position: Center

Coaching career (HC unless noted)

Football
- 1922–1923: Georgetown (KY)
- 1924–1925: Akron
- 1927–1935: Minot State
- 1936–?: Nevada (assistant)

Basketball
- 1922–1925: Georgetown (KY)
- 1924–1925: Akron
- 1927–1936: Minot State

Track
- 1936–?: Nevada

Head coaching record
- Overall: 39–36–10 (football); 95–80 (basketball)

Accomplishments and honors

Championships
- Football; 1 NDIAC (1932)

James Weatherby Coleman Sr. (October 27, 1894 – May 20, 1993) was an American college football, college basketball, and track coach. He served as the head football coach at Georgetown College in Georgetown, Kentucky from 1922 to 1923, the University of Akron from 1924 to 1925, and Minot State Teacher's College—now known as Minot State University—in Minot, North Dakota from 1927 to 1935, compiling a career college football coaching record of 39–36–10. Coleman also coached the men's basketball team at Akron for one season in 1924–25, tallying a mark of 8–5. He played college football at the University of Arkansas. Coleman was hired in 1936 as head track coach and assistant football coach at the University of Nevada.

Coleman married Ruth Eloise Robbins (1897–1968) on December 30, 1922, in Mena, Arkansas. He served as an officer in the United States Army during World War I, World War II, and the Korean War. Coleman died on May 20, 1993, at his home in Reno, Nevada.

== Head coaching record ==
=== Football ===
| Year | Team | Overall | Conference | Standing | Bowl/playoffs |
|---|---|---|---|---|---|
Georgetown Tigers (Independent) (1922–1923)
| 1922 | Georgetown | 3–4–1 | | | |
| 1923 | Georgetown | 3–7 | | | |
| Georgetown: | | 6–11–1 | | | |
Akron (Ohio Athletic Conference) (1924–1925)
| 1924 | Akron | 5–3 | 3–2 | 6th | |
| 1925 | Akron | 1–7 | 1–6 | T–18th | |
| Akron: | | 6–10 | 4–9 | | |
Minot State Beavers (Interstate Athletic Conference) (1927–1931)
| 1927 | Minot State | 0–3 | | | |
| 1928 | Minot State | 2–2–1 | 2–2–1 | T–4th | |
| 1929 | Minot State | 2–2 | | | |
| 1930 | Minot State | 4–2 | 3–2 | T–4th | |
| 1931 | Minot State | 4–0–2 | | | |
Minot State Beavers (North Dakota Intercollegiate Athletic Conference) (1932–1935)
| 1932 | Minot State | 5–1–1 | 4–0–1 | T–1st | |
| 1933 | Minot State | 4–1–2 | 2–1–2 | 3rd | |
| 1934 | Minot State | 5–2 | 2–1 | NA | |
| 1935 | Minot State | 1–2–3 | 1–1–2 | T–4th | |
| Minot State: | | 27–15–9 | | | |
| Total: | | 39–36–10 | | | |
National championship Conference title Conference division title or championship game berth

=== Basketball ===
Record table
| Season | Team | Overall | Conference | Standing | Postseason |
|---|---|---|---|---|---|
Akron (Ohio Athletic Conference) (1924–1925)
| 1924–25 | Akron | 8–5 | 8–5 | T–6th | |
| Akron: | | 8–5 | 8–5 | | |
| Total: | | | | | |
