= Sam H. Bell =

American judge (1925–2010)

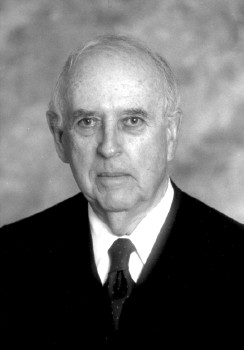

Senior Judge of the United States District Court for the Northern District of Ohio
- In office October 30, 1996 – December 23, 2010

Judge of the United States District Court for the Northern District of Ohio
- In office December 22, 1982 – October 30, 1996
- Appointed by: Ronald Reagan
- Preceded by: Robert B. Krupansky
- Succeeded by: James S. Gwin

Personal details
- Born: Samuel H. Bell; December 31, 1925 Rochester, New York
- Died: December 23, 2010 (aged 84) Akron, Ohio
- Education: College of Wooster (B.A.); American University; University of Akron School of Law (J.D.)

Sam H. Bell (December 31, 1925 – December 23, 2010) was a United States district judge of the United States District Court for the Northern District of Ohio.

== Early life and education ==
Born in Rochester, New York, Bell was the only child of Marie (Willis) Bell and Samuel Bell. The family moved to Akron, Ohio, where Bell attended Buchtel High School before going to the College of Wooster in Wooster, Ohio. He graduated from Wooster with a Bachelor of Arts degree and married Joyce Shaw. They had two children. Bell pursued post-graduate studies at American University in Washington, D.C., and obtained his Juris Doctor from the University of Akron School of Law in 1952.

== Career ==
He was admitted to the bar of the State of Ohio and became an Assistant County Prosecutor in Summit County, Ohio. He then entered the private practice of law in Cuyahoga Falls, Ohio from 1956 to 1968. During this time he was an assistant county prosecutor for Summit County from 1957 to 1959, and special counsel for the attorney general of the State of Ohio from 1959 to 1966. He was also an assistant solicitor and special trial counsel for the City of Tallmadge, Ohio from 1963 to 1965. In 1968 Bell was appointed by Ohio Governor Jim Rhodes to a vacancy on the Cuyahoga Falls Municipal Court. He later was elected to that post, holding it until 1973. He then ran for and was elected to the Summit County Court of Common Pleas for Summit County from 1973 to 1977. He was then appointed to the Ohio Ninth District Court of Appeals and later was elected to that position, serving until 1982.

== Federal judicial service ==
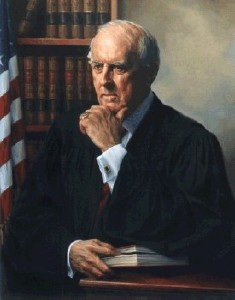
Judicial portrait of Bell, 1999, by Michael DelPriore.

Bell was nominated by President Ronald Reagan on November 23, 1982, to a seat on the United States District Court for the Northern District of Ohio vacated by Judge Robert B. Krupansky. Bell was confirmed by the United States Senate on December 21, 1982, and received his commission the following day. He sat in Cleveland, Ohio and then later in Akron. He assumed senior status on October 30, 1996. He died in Akron on December 23, 2010.

== Sources ==
- Samuel H. Bell. History of the Sixth Circuit. U.S. Court of Appeals for the Sixth Circuit.

Legal offices
Preceded by Robert B. Krupansky	Judge of the United States District Court for the Northern District of Ohio; 19821996	Succeeded by James S. Gwin
