= Clarence Weed =

American football and basketball coach

Biographical details
- Born: September 1, 1885; Lapeer, Michigan, U.S.
- Died: December 19, 1966 (aged 81); Detroit, Michigan, U.S.
- Education: Olivet College; University of Michigan

Coaching career (HC unless noted)

Football
- 1909: Buchtel

Basketball
- 1909–1910: Buchtel

Head coaching record
- Overall: 4–4 (football); 5–3 (basketball)

Clarence R. Weed (September 1, 1885 – December 19, 1966) was an American college football and college basketball coach. He served as the head football coach at Buchtel College—now known as the University of Akron—for one season in 1909, compiling a record of 4–4. Weed also coached the men's basketball team at Buchtel that academic year, 1909–10, tallying a mark of 5–3. Weed was a graduate of Olivet College and the University of Michigan.

== Head coaching record ==
=== Football ===
Year	Team	Overall	Conference	Standing	Bowl/playoffs
Buchtel (Independent) (1909)
1909	Buchtel	4–4			
Buchtel:		4–4			
Total:		4–4			

=== Basketball ===
Record table
Season	Team	Overall	Conference	Standing	Postseason
Buchtel (Independent) (1909–1910)
1909–10	Buchtel	5–3			
Buchtel:		5–3			
Total:		5–3			
