= Loren Jackson =

American basketball player (born 1996)

No. 2 – Shandong Honey Badger
- Position: Point guard
- League: NBL

Personal information
- Born: December 15, 1996 (age 29) Chicago, Illinois, U.S.
- Listed height: 5 ft 8 in (1.73 m)
- Listed weight: 160 lb (73 kg)

Career information
- High school: Victory Rock Prep (Bradenton, Florida)
- College: Long Beach State (2016–2017); Akron (2018–2021)
- NBA draft: 2021: undrafted
- Playing career: 2021–present

Career history
- 2021–2022: Chorale Roanne Basket
- 2022–2023: SC Derby
- 2023: BCM Gravelines-Dunkerque
- 2024: Legia Warszawa
- 2024–2025: Czarni Słupsk
- 2025–2026: Yankey Ark
- 2026–present: Shandong Honey Badger

Career highlights
- Polish Cup winner (2024); MAC Player of the Year (2020); First-team All-MAC (2020)

Loren Cristian Jackson (born December 15, 1996) is an American professional basketball player for Shandong Honey Badger of the Chinese National Basketball League (NBL). He played college basketball for the Akron Zips.

== Early life ==
Jackson is the son of Loren Brian Jackson, the founder and basketball coach at Victory Rock Prep in Bradenton, Florida. Jackson played at Victory Rock Prep. As a senior, Jackson averaged 22.2 points and 7.3 assists per game.

== College career ==
Jackson began his college career at Long Beach State. After not receiving much playing time as a freshman, he decided to transfer to Akron. His father was friends with Akron coach John Groce and Jackson wanted to play with former high school teammate Deng Riak. Jackson scored in double figures in seven straight games in January and February 2019, and evolved into Akron's go-to player despite his short stature. As a sophomore, Jackson averaged 13.9 points and 3.1 assists per game. Jackson scored a career-high 35 points in three games, versus Ohio, Bowling Green, and Buffalo. As a junior, Jackson averaged 19.8 points and 4.5 assists per game. He was named Mid-American Conference Player of the Year. He also surpassed the 1,000 point mark during the season. Jackson got player of the week twice so far this year (2021). In 2020 he got named player of the year. He has a count of 31 points in the games he plays for Akron and assists for points and a lot of 3 pointers in all his games

== Professional career ==
On June 25, 2021, Jackson signed with Chorale Roanne Basket of the LNB Pro A.

On July 14, 2023, Jackson signed with BCM Gravelines-Dunkerque of the LNB Pro A, and will play the FIBA Europe Cup too.

On January 22, 2024, he signed with Legia Warszawa of the Polish Basketball League (PLK).

On June 29, 2024, he signed with Czarni Słupsk of the Polish Basketball League (PLK).
