= Wyatt Webb =

American basketball player and coach

Biographical details
- Born: April 6, 1941
- Died: October 8, 2003 (aged 62)

Playing career
- 1959–1963: Akron

Coaching career (HC unless noted)
- 1969–1975: Akron

Head coaching record
- Overall: 126–60

Wyatt M. Webb (April 6, 1941 – October 8, 2003) was a college basketball head coach for the Akron Zips men's basketball team from 1969 to 1975. When Webb was named head coach in 1968, it was unheard of for someone in his mid-20s (Webb was 26) to be in such a position.

== Career ==
Webb had finished his playing career at Akron just a few years earlier. He proved the doubters wrong, compiling a 126–60 record in seven seasons and taking the Zips to three NCAA Division II tournaments, including a title game appearance in 1971–72. Even though he resigned after 1975, he stayed at the university as a teacher and chairperson.

Webb died in 2003 at the age of 62.
