= Ken Cunningham (basketball) =

American basketball player and coach

Biographical details
- Born: February 15, 1943; East Liverpool, Ohio, U.S.
- Died: February 9, 2015 (aged 71); Stow, Ohio, U.S.

Playing career
- 1962–1965: Cincinnati
- Position: Guard

Coaching career (HC unless noted)
- 1969–1976: Cincinnati (assistant)
- 1976–1980: Akron

Ken Cunningham (February 15, 1943 – February 9, 2015) was a college basketball head coach. He coached the Akron Zips men's basketball team from 1977 to 1980, guiding the Zips to a 42–61 record. Prior to arriving at Akron, Cunningham served as an assistant coach at the University of Cincinnati, his alma mater, under Tay Baker and Gale Catlett. Cincinnati went 136–56 during those years, reaching the NIT tournament in 1974 and the NCAA tournament in 1975 and 1976. As a player, Cunningham played guard for the Bearcats from 1961–65 and was a member of the 1963 NCAA runner-up team that lost in overtime to Loyola, Chicago. In 1961, Cunningham was named the Ohio High School Basketball Player of the Year. He died in 2015, aged 71.
