= Kwan Cheatham =

American basketball player (born 1995)

- Cheatham with Joventut in 2026

No. 55 – Joventut Badalona
- Position: Power forward / center
- League: Liga ACB

Personal information
- Born: August 21, 1995 (age 31) Vallejo, California, U.S.
- Listed height: 6 ft 10 in (2.08 m)
- Listed weight: 235 lb (107 kg)

Career information
- High school: Winton Woods (Cincinnati, Ohio)
- College: Akron (2013–2017)
- NBA draft: 2017: undrafted
- Playing career: 2017–present

Career history
- 2017–2019: Kangoeroes Mechelen
- 2019–2020: Levski Sofia
- 2020: Le Portel
- 2020–2021: Ironi Ness Ziona
- 2021–2022: Fuenlabrada
- 2022–2023: Victoria Libertas Pesaro
- 2023–2024: Granada
- 2024–2026: Reggio Emilia
- 2026–present: Joventut Badalona

Career highlights
- Spanish Supercup winner (2026)

Kwan Cheatham Jr. (born August 21, 1995) is an American basketball player for Joventut of the Liga ACB. He plays forward and center.

== Early and personal life ==
Cheatham was born in Vallejo, California. His parents are Kwan and Cherisse Cheatham. He is 6 ft 10 in (208 cm) tall, and weighs 235 pounds (107 kg). His hometown is Cincinnati, Ohio.

== High school career ==
He attended Winton Woods High School in Cincinnati. As a junior in 2012, Cheatham averaged 12.8 points, 6.7 rebounds, 3.0 assists, and 1.7 blocked shots per game, and was named honorable mention All-Ohio. As a senior he averaged 11.3 points, 8.9 rebounds, 2.7 blocked shots, and 2.2 assists per game, and was named Co-Defensive MVP.

== College career ==
Cheatham attended Akron University, majoring in sports management. As a sophomore in 2014–15, he averaged 7.9 points, 5.0 rebounds, 1.5 assists, and 1.1 blocked shots per game, and finished the season seventh in the Mid-American Conference in blocked shots.

As a junior in 2015–16, he averaged 7.2 points, 4.9 rebounds, 1.6 assists, and 1.0 blocked shot per game. On January 28, 2017, Cheatham scored a career-high 31 points in a 91–90 win over Buffalo. As a senior in 2016–17, he averaged 11.0 points, 7.2 rebounds, and 1.8 assists per game, and was 6th in the MAC in rebounds, with 258, and in blocked shots per game, with 1.0, and shot 79.7 per cent from the line.

== Professional career ==
After going undrafted in the 2017 NBA draft, Cheatham signed a professional deal with Kangoeroes Basket Mechelen of the Belgian league. In the 2018–19 season he averaged 13.4 points and six rebounds per game. He signed with BC Levski Sofia in September 2019. In January 2020, Cheatham signed with ESSM Le Portel in France.

On August 24, 2020, he signed with Ironi Nes Ziona of the Israel Basketball Premier League. In 2020–21 he was second in the Israel Basketball Premier League in free throw percentage (92.0 per cent).

On January 6, 2021, Cheatham signed with Fuenlabrada of the Spanish Liga ACB. He averaged 7 points and 3 rebounds per game. Cheatham re-signed with the team on July 5, 2021.

On August 7, 2022, he has signed with Victoria Libertas Pesaro of the Italian Lega Basket Serie A (LBA).

On July 20, 2024, he signed with Pallacanestro Reggiana of the Italian Lega Basket Serie A (LBA).

On July 18, 2026, he signed with Joventut of the Liga ACB.
