= Alex Adams (basketball) =

American basketball coach (1934–2011)

Biographical details
- Born: October 21, 1934; Akron, Ohio, U.S.
- Died: July 22, 2011 (aged 76); Ocala, Florida, U.S.

Playing career
- 1959–1961: Akron

Coaching career (HC unless noted)
- 1975–1976: Akron

Head coaching record
- Overall: 10–14

Alex Adams (October 21, 1934 – July 22, 2011) was a college basketball head coach. He coached the Akron Zips men's basketball team in 1975–76 to a 10–14 record. Adams was the first African-American to both play and coach basketball at the University of Akron.
