= Akron Zips men's basketball =

Men's basketball team of the University of Akron

2026–27 Akron Zips men's basketball team
- University: University of Akron
- Athletic director: Andrew T. Goodrich
- Head coach: Dustin Ford (1st season)
- Location: Akron, Ohio
- Arena: James A. Rhodes Arena (capacity: 5,500)
- Conference: Mid-American
- Nickname: Zips
- Colors: Blue and gold
- Student section: AK-ROWDIES

NCAA Division I tournament appearances
- 1986, 2009, 2011, 2013, 2022, 2024, 2025, 2026

NCAA Division II tournament runner-up
- 1964, 1972
Other NCAA Division II tournament results
Final Four	1964, 1966, 1972
Elite Eight	1964, 1965, 1966, 1972, 1975
Sweet Sixteen	1958, 1964, 1965, 1966, 1967, 1972, 1975
Appearances	1958, 1964, 1965, 1966, 1967, 1971, 1972, 1975

Conference tournament champions
- OAC: 1959, 1964, 1965, 1966 OVC: 1986 MAC: 2009, 2011, 2013, 2022, 2024, 2025, 2026

Conference regular-season champions
- OAC: 1934, 1945, 1946, 1953, 1956, 1958, 1965, 1966 OVC: 1986 MAC: 2012, 2013, 2016, 2017, 2020, 2025

Conference division champions
- 1998, 2007, 2012, 2013, 2016, 2017, 2020

Uniforms
Home	Away	Alternate

The Akron Zips men's basketball team represents the University of Akron in Akron, Ohio. As the 45th-winningest men's basketball program of all-time since the start of the 2025–26 season, the team currently competes in the Mid-American Conference East division. The Zips are currently coached by Dustin Ford. Prior to becoming members of the MAC in 1992, the Zips were members of the Ohio Valley Conference and the Mid-Continent Conference. They had played in NCAA Division II into the mid 1970s, where they reached the National Championship Game twice, both of which they lost.

The Zips have appeared in the NCAA tournament eight times, most recently in 2026. The team first played in the NCAA tournament in 1986 when Bob Huggins was its coach. In 2006, the Zips received an invitation to the NIT and won their first post season game at Temple University before falling in the second round. In 2007, the team won their second MAC East title and tied the school record for wins in a season in the Division I era with 26. They also made their first appearance in the MAC Tournament Championship game, which they lost on a last-second shot 53–52 to the Miami RedHawks. The loss cost them the MAC's automatic berth and they were subsequently not selected for either the 2007 NCAA tournament or NIT, despite finishing with a 26–7 record. The Zips posted a 24–11 record (11–5 in the MAC) in 2008 which included a second-straight appearance in the MAC tournament championship game and a berth in the 2008 National Invitation Tournament.

== History ==
The team was established in 1901, when the school was still known as Buchtel College, playing out of Crouse Gym, the school's original building, built in 1888. They played their first game against Mount Union College, a 120–9 loss. The team played just four games in the 1901–1902 season, winning their final two against the Western Reserve College medical school. The team's first three seasons were spent without the benefit of a head coach. This changed with the arrival of the first head coach, Earl Williams, who would coach from 1904 to 1908.

=== Early history ===
Growing too big for Crouse, the team began playing at the Akron Armory, just a few blocks off-campus, in the 1920s. The Zips began play in the Ohio Athletic Conference in 1923 where they would compete from 1923 to 1965 except for 1936–1944 when the University left the OAC and competed as an independent. During their first season back in the OAC, Akron would unknowingly find themselves on the opposite end on what could be considered the first gambling scandal in college basketball history with five of Brooklyn College's players being arrested in a failed attempt to throw a January 29, 1945 game against Akron. In the OAC, Akron would win 8 conference titles and five tournament titles, three of them under legendary coach, Tony Laterza. In 1954 the Zips moved into their own on-campus home, Memorial Hall, located to the east of Crouse Gym.

After the 1965–1966 season Akron left the OAC for good and competed as an independent in the NCAA's College Division, which would later be renamed Division II. When the NCAA divided into three divisions in 1973, the Zips would play one season in Division III before moving to Division II, where they would play from 1975 to 1980. During the final three years as a Division II member, the Zips were part of an earlier Mid-Continent Conference for two years before joining the Ohio Valley Conference for the 1979–1980 season (though they did not play conference games until the 1980–1981 season), their last in Division II.

The Zips participated in the NCAA Division II tournament on seven different occasions, making the Division II Final Four three times (1964, 1966, and 1972) and reaching the championship game in 1964 and 1972, falling to Evansville and Roanoke, respectively. Coach Laterza's winning percentage at UA of .751 (178–59 from 1960 to 1968) remains best in the history of the program.

- OAC regular-season titles: 1934, 1945, 1946, 1953, 1956, 1958, 1965, 1966
- OAC tournament titles: 1959, 1964, 1965, 1966
- NAIA tournament appearance: 1943
- NCAA Division II tournament appearances: 1958, 1964, 1965, 1966, 1967, 1971, 1972, 1975
- NCAA Division II Final Four: 1964, 1966, 1972
- NCAA Division II runner-up: 1964, 1972

=== Division I era ===
Akron attained NCAA Division I status in 1980 and began play in the Ohio Valley Conference that fall. In 1983, the Zips moved into their current arena, the James A. Rhodes Arena, just to the east of old Memorial Hall. In 1984 Bob Huggins began coaching the team, leading the Zips to the 1986 OVC title and tournament title to gain their first berth in the NCAA Division I men's basketball tournament as a No. 15 seed, where they fell to the 5th-ranked and No. 2-seeded Michigan Wolverines 70–64 in the first round. Akron would play one more season in the OVC and earn a berth in the 1987 National Invitation Tournament before another stint as an independent from 1987 to 1990. Huggins would lead the Zips to the 1989 NIT before leaving Akron after the season to coach at Cincinnati. Akron would rejoin the Mid-Continent Conference in 1990 and compete for two seasons before officially beginning play in the Mid-American Conference in 1992. The Zips struggled early on as members of the MAC including a disastrous 0–18 MAC season in 1995–1996 which saw the Zips finish the season 3–23 overall on a 21-game losing streak after a 3–1 start. Akron posted their first winning season in MAC play during the 1997–1998 season under coach Dan Hipsher going 13–5 and winning the first MAC East division title and qualifying for the MAC tournament for the first time. The Zips posted winning MAC records in 1998–1999 and 1999–2000 before struggling for several seasons, ultimately leading to the dismissal of Hipsher and the hiring of Keith Dambrot as head coach in 2004.

==== Keith Dambrot era ====
Dambrot had previously coached at nearby St. Vincent - St. Mary High School in Akron and had coached LeBron James. Dambrot lead a resurgence in Zips basketball, posting a winning record (19–10, 11–7 MAC) in the 2004–2005 season, their first winning campaign since 2000, and a second MAC East division title in 2007. Under Dambrot, the Zips had won 21 or more games in each of the last 12 seasons (beginning in 2005–2006) and had made ten postseason appearances: the 2009, 2011, and 2013 NCAA tournament, the 2006, 2008, 2012, 2016, and 2017 NIT, the 2010 CBI, and the 2014 CIT. The 2006–2007 team tied the school record for wins, finishing 26–7, but failed to earn an invitation to any postseason tournament. In 2007, the Zips advanced to the MAC tournament championship game for the first time in program history, losing on a last-second shot 53–52 to the Miami RedHawks at Quicken Loans Arena in Cleveland. They made a second appearance in 2008, falling to arch-rival Kent State 74–55. Finally, in 2009, the Zips defeated Buffalo in the MAC Championship Game and advanced to their first NCAA tournament in 23 years, falling to Gonzaga in Round One. The Zips fell to Ohio in the 2010 MAC Championship Game, but returned to beat Kent State in the 2011 MAC Championship Game (their 5th consecutive appearance in the title game) to advance to the NCAA tournament for the 2nd time in 3 seasons. Dambrot left the Zips to take a head coaching position at Duquesne University.

==== John Groce era ====
Groce had coached at the University of Illinois since 2012 before being hired as the Head coach for the Zips. The Zips had a rough start adjusting to their new head coach, finishing 14-18 overall on the season and losing to Eastern Michigan in the Quarterfinals of the MAC tournament 58-67. During the 2019-2020 season the Zips finally caught their stride with Groce at the helm finishing the season with a record of 24-7, the best since Groce began his tenure. However, due to the COVID-19 pandemic the MAC tournament was cancelled and no conference champion was crowned.

== MAC season records ==
Season	Overall record*	MAC tournament record	Postseason record
Coleman Crawford (1992–1995)
1992–93	8–18 (3–15)	Did not qualify	–
1993–94	8–18 (2–16)	Did not qualify	–
1994–95	8–18 (4–14)	Did not qualify	–
Dan Hipsher (1995–2004)
1995–96	3–23 (0–18)	Did not qualify	–
1996–97	8–18 (6–12)	Did not qualify	–
1997–98	17–10 (13–5)	0–1; Lost in quarterfinal	–
1998–99	18–9 (12–6)	0–1; Lost in quarterfinal	–
1999-00	17–11 (11–7)	0–1; Lost in quarterfinal	–
2000–01	12–16 (9–9)	0–1; Lost in first round	–
2001–02	10–21 (5–13)	1–1; Lost in quarterfinal	–
2002–03	14–14 (9–9)	0–1; Lost in first round	–
2003–04	13–15 (7–11)	0–1; Lost in first round	–
Keith Dambrot (2004–2017)
2004–05	19–10 (11–7)	1–1; Lost in quarterfinal	–
2005–06	23–10 (14–4)	1–1; Lost in semifinal	1–1; NIT second round
2006–07	26–7 (13–3)	2–1; Lost in final	–
2007–08	24–11 (11–5)	2–1; Lost in Final	1–1; NIT second round
2008–09	23–13 (10–6)	4–0; Won tournament	0–1; NCAA tournament first round
2009–10	24–11 (12–4)	2–1; Lost in final	0–1 CBI first round
2010–11	23–13 (9–7)	4–0; Won tournament	0–1; NCAA tournament first round
2011–12	21–12 (13–3)	1–1; Lost in final	0–1; NIT first round
2012–13	26–7 (14–2)†	2–0; Won tournament	0–1; NCAA tournament first round
2013–14	21–13 (12–6)	1–1; Lost in semifinals	0–1; CIT first round
2014–15	21–14 (9–9)	3–1; Lost in semifinals	–
2015–16	26–9 (13–5)	2–1; Lost in final	0–1; NIT first round
2016–17	24–7 (14–4)	2–1; Lost in final	1–1; NIT second round
John Groce (2017–present)
2017–18	14–18 (6–12)	1–1; Lost in quarterfinal	–
2018–19	17–16 (8–10)	1–1; Lost in quarterfinal	–
2019–20	24–7 (14–4)	–	–
2020–21	15–8 (12–6)	1–1; Lost in semifinals	–
2021–22	24–10 (14–6)	3–0; Won tournament	0–1; NCAA tournament first round
2022–23	22–11 (13–5)	1–1; Lost in semifinals	–
2023–24	24–10 (13–5)	3–0; Won tournament	0–1; NCAA tournament first round
2024–25	28–7 (17–1)†	3–0; Won tournament	0–1; NCAA tournament first round
2025–26	29–6 (17–1)	3–0; Won tournament	0–1; NCAA tournament first round

* –Tournament Titles shaded in ██ dark gold. Regular-Season Titles shaded in ██ light gold. East Division Titles shaded in ██ light blue.

* – Overall record includes tournament/postseason results; Regular season conference record contained in parentheses.

* – † Indicates regular-season and tournament title.

== MAC tournament ==
Since joining the MAC for the 1992–93 season, the Zips have appeared in the last 29 conference tournaments, making their first appearance in 1998, the same year they won their first MAC East division title. Since then they have posted a record of 44–21 in tournament play including consecutive appearances in the championship game between 2007 and 2013 for which is the current record for consecutive appearances. Additionally, they also hold the record for best winning percentage in the MAC Tournament at 0.612.

Year	Seed	Location	Round	Result
1998	3rd	Akron, OH	Quarterfinal	L 88–95 to (6) Kent State
1999	4th	Akron, OH	Quarterfinal	L 74–80^{OT} (5) Bowling Green
2000	4th	Akron, OH	Opening	L 73–75 to (13) Central Michigan
2001	9th	Oxford, OH	Opening	L 56–69 to (8) Miami
2002	11th	Kalamazoo, MI	Opening	W 90–83 over (6) Western Michigan
2002	11th	Cleveland, OH	Quarterfinal	L 58–60 to (3) Bowling Green
2003	6th	Akron, OH	Opening	L 77–79 to (11) Ohio
2004	11th	Muncie, IN	Opening	L 72–76 to (6) Ball State
2005	6th	Akron, OH	Opening	W 79–66 over (11) Eastern Michigan
2005	6th	Cleveland, OH	Quarterfinal	L 60–66^{OT} to (3) Western Michigan
2006	3rd	Cleveland, OH	Quarterfinal	W 72–57 over (6) Western Michigan
2006	3rd	Cleveland, OH	Semifinal	L 69–77 to (7) Toledo
2007	2nd	Cleveland, OH	Quarterfinal	W 82–53 over (7) Central Michigan
2007	2nd	Cleveland, OH	Semifinal	W 61–54 over (3) Kent State
2007	2nd	Cleveland, OH	Final	L 52–53 to (4) Miami (OH)
2008	3rd	Cleveland, OH	Quarterfinal	W 81–60 over (6) Central Michigan
2008	3rd	Cleveland, OH	Semifinal	W 73–62 over (2) Western Michigan
2008	3rd	Cleveland, OH	Final	L 55–74 to (1) Kent State
2009	5th	Cleveland, OH	Opening	W 93–92^{2OT} over (12) Toledo
2009	5th	Cleveland, OH	Quarterfinal	W 73–63 over (4) Miami
2009	5th	Cleveland, OH	Semifinal	W 63–55 over (1) Bowling Green
2009	5th	Cleveland, OH	Final	W 65–53 over (3) Buffalo
2010	3rd	Cleveland, OH	Quarterfinal	W 97–89^{2OT} over (6) Eastern Michigan
2010	3rd	Cleveland, OH	Semifinal	W 66–64 over (7) Western Michigan
2010	3rd	Cleveland, OH	Final	L 75–81^{OT} to (9) Ohio
2011	6th	Akron, OH	Opening	W 67–53 over (11) Eastern Michigan
2011	6th	Cleveland, OH	Quarterfinal	W 82–75^{2OT} over (3) Miami
2011	6th	Cleveland, OH	Semifinal	W 79–68 over (2) Western Michigan
2011	6th	Cleveland, OH	Final	W 66–65^{OT} over (1) Kent State
2012	1st	Cleveland, OH	Semifinal	W 78–74 over (4) Kent State
2012	1st	Cleveland, OH	Final	L 63–64 to (3) Ohio
2013	1st	Cleveland, OH	Semifinal	W 62–59 over (4) Kent State
2013	1st	Cleveland, OH	Final	W 65–46 to (2) Ohio
2014	4th	Cleveland, OH	Quarterfinal	W 83–77 over (5) Ohio
2014	4th	Cleveland, OH	Semifinal	L 60–64^{OT} to (1) Western Michigan
2015	7th	Akron, OH	First Round	W 76–52 over (10) Northern Illinois
2015	7th	Cleveland OH	Second Round	W 58–45 over (6) Western Michigan
2015	7th	Cleveland OH	Quarterfinal	W 53–51 over (3) Kent State
2015	7th	Cleveland OH	Semifinal	L 59–68 to (2) Buffalo
2016	1st	Cleveland, OH	Quarterfinal	W 65–63 over (8) Eastern Michigan
2016	1st	Cleveland, OH	Semifinal	W 80–66 over (12) Bowling Green
2016	1st	Cleveland, OH	Final	L 61–64 to (3) Buffalo
2017	1st	Cleveland, OH	Quarterfinal	W 79–62 over (8) Eastern Michigan
2017	1st	Cleveland, OH	Semifinal	W 74–70 over (4) Ball State
2017	1st	Cleveland, OH	Final	L 65–70 to (6) Kent State
2018	11th	Kalamazoo, MI	Opening	W 79–78 over (6) Western Michigan
2018	11th	Cleveland, OH	Quarterfinal	L 58–67 to (3) Eastern Michigan
2019	8th	Akron, OH	Opening	W 80–51 over (9) Miami
2019	8th	Cleveland, OH	Quarterfinal	L 46–82 to (1) No. 18 Buffalo
2020	1st	Cleveland, OH	Quarterfinal	–
2021	8th	Cleveland, OH	Quarterfinal	W 74–67 over (6) Bowling Green
2021	8th	Cleveland, OH	Semifinal	L 74–81^{OT} to (2) Buffalo
2022	4th	Cleveland, OH	Quarterfinal	W 70–68 over (5) Buffalo
2022	4th	Cleveland, OH	Semifinal	W 70–62 over (1) Toledo
2022	4th	Cleveland, OH	Final	W 75–55 over (2) Kent State
2023	3rd	Cleveland, OH	Quarterfinal	W 101–77 over (6) Buffalo
2023	3rd	Cleveland, OH	Semifinal	L 73–79 to (2) Kent State
2024	2nd	Cleveland, OH	Quarterfinal	W 75–63 over (7) Miami
2024	2nd	Cleveland, OH	Semifinal	W 65–62 over (3) Ohio
2024	2nd	Cleveland, OH	Final	W 62–61 over (8) Kent State
2025	1st	Cleveland, OH	Quarterfinal	W 96–67 over (8) Bowling Green
2025	1st	Cleveland, OH	Semifinal	W 100–90 over (3) Toledo
2025	1st	Cleveland, OH	Final	W 76–74 over (2) Miami
2026	2nd	Cleveland, OH	Quarterfinal	W 73–70 over (7) Buffalo
2026	2nd	Cleveland, OH	Semifinal	W 75–68 over (3) Kent State
2026	2nd	Cleveland, OH	Final	W 79–76 over (4) Toledo
Totals: 13 finals appearances, 7 championships, 44–21 record in tournament

== Postseason ==
=== NCAA Division I ===
The Zips have appeared in the NCAA tournament eight times. Their combined record is 0–8.

Year	Seed	Round	Opponent	Result
1986	#15	First Round	#2 Michigan	L 64–70
2009	#13	First Round	#4 Gonzaga	L 64–77
2011	#15	First Round	#2 Notre Dame	L 56–69
2013	#12	First Round	#5 VCU	L 42–88
2022	#13	First Round	#4 UCLA	L 53–57
2024	#14	First Round	#3 Creighton	L 60–77
2025	#13	First Round	#4 Arizona	L 65–93
2026	#12	First Round	#5 Texas Tech	L 71–91

=== NCAA Division II ===
The Zips appeared in eight NCAA Division II men's basketball tournaments. Their combined record was 19–8.

Year	Round	Opponent	Result
1958	First Round; Sweet Sixteen	Austin Peay; Evansville	W 76–61; L 70–82
1964	Round of 32; Sweet Sixteen; Elite Eight; Final Four; National Championship	Ithaca; Le Moyne; Hofstra; North Carolina A&T; Evansville	W 94–77; W 62–38; W 77–58; W 57–48; L 59–72
1965	First Round; Sweet Sixteen; Elite Eight	Steubenville; Buffalo; St. Michael's	W 72–70; W 69–58; L 87–101
1966	Round of 32; Sweet Sixteen; Elite Eight; Final Four; Third Place Game	Youngstown State; Steubenville; Long Island; Kentucky Wesleyan; North Dakota	W 70–51; W 93–76; W 74–68; L 74–105; W 76–71
1967	First Round; Sweet Sixteen	Mount St. Mary's; Winston-Salem	W 98–72; L 80–88
1971	First Round; Regional Third Place	Cheyney; Wooster	L 89–100; W 77–68
1972	Round of 32; Sweet Sixteen; Elite Eight; Final Four; National Championship	Philadelphia U Youngstown State; Southern Colorado; Tennessee State; Roanoke	W 54–52; W 87–71; W 92–77; W 71–69 ^{OT} L 72–84
1975	Round of 32; Sweet Sixteen; Elite Eight	Eastern Illinois; St. Joseph's (IN); Tennessee State	W 76–62; W 58–52; L 69–72

=== NIT ===
The Zips have appeared in seven National Invitation Tournaments. Their combined record is 3–7.

Year	Seed	Round	Opponent	Result
1987	NA	First Round	Illinois State	L 79–72
1989	NA	First Round	Ohio State	L 81–70
2006	#8	Opening Round; First Round	#7 Temple #2 Creighton	W 80–73; L 71–60
2008	#6	First Round; Second Round	#3 Florida State #2 UMass	W 65–60; L 68–63
2012	#5	First Round	#4 Northwestern	L 76–74
2016	#6	First Round	#3 Ohio State	L 72–63^{OT}
2017	#7	First Round; Second Round	#2 Houston #6 UT Arlington	W 78–75; L 85–69

Note: Beginning in 2006, the NIT began using a seeding and region system similar to what is used in the NCAA tournament.

=== CIT ===
The Zips have appeared in one CollegeInsider.com Postseason Tournament. Their record is 0–1.

Year	Location	Round	Opponent	Result
2014	Fort Wayne, IN	First Round	IPFW	L 97–91

== Awards ==
=== MAC Awards ===
MAC Player of the Year
Name	Year
Romeo Travis	2007
Isaiah Johnson	2017
Loren Cristian Jackson	2020
Enrique Freeman	2024
Nate Johnson	2025
MAC Defensive Player of the Year
Nate Linhart	2009
Jimmy Conyers	2010
Zeke Marshall	2012, 2013
Enrique Freeman	2022
Nate Johnson	2025
MAC Sixth Player Award
Name	Year
Cedrick Middleton	2007
Brett McKnight	2009
Quincy Diggs	2012
Jake Kretzer	2014
Isaiah Johnson	2016
Shammah Scott	2025, 2026
MAC Freshman of the Year
Jimmal Ball	1997

Academic All-MAC Selections
Name	Year
Mark Alberts	1993
Doug Jackson	1995
Andy Hipsher	2003, 2004
Steve McNees	2011
Brian Walsh	2012, 2013
Reggie McAdams	2015, 2016
Jake Kretzer	2015, 2016
Josh Williams	2017
Loren Cristian Jackson	2019
Kobe Mitchell	2023
Enrique Freeman	2024

MAC Coach of the Year
Name	Year
Dan Hipsher	1998
Keith Dambrot	2013, 2016, 2017
John Groce	2020, 2025

=== All-Americans ===
All-America
Name	Year	Team
Len Paul	1972	1st Team AP
Romeo Travis	2007	Honorable Mention
Isaiah Johnson	2017	Honorable Mention
Enrique Freeman	2024	Honorable Mention
Academic All-America
Nate Schindewolf	2001	Second Team

== Individual career records ==
These records are up to date as of the 2023-2024 season.

Points
1. Joe Jakubick – 2,583
2. Len Paul – 2,028
3. Enrique Freeman – 1,846
4. Eric McLaughlin – 1,810
5. John Britton – 1,657
6. Bill Turner – 1,630
7. Jimmal Ball – 1,577
8. Romeo Travis – 1,491
9. Don Williams – 1,445
10. Alex Adams – 1,442

Rebounds
1. Enrique Freeman – 1,405
2. Fred Golding – 1,360
3. Don Williams – 1,218
4. Ray Pryear – 1,213
5. Bill Turner – 1,171
6. Len Paul – 1,021
7. Frank Thompson – 996
8. Alex Adams – 872
9. Harvey Glover – 801
10. Romeo Travis – 783

Assists
1. Dru Joyce – 503
2. Eric McLaughlin – 476
3. Alex Abreu – 450
4. Jimmal Ball – 391
5. Nate Barnett – 351
6. Andy Hipsher – 344
7. Nick Dials – 326
8. Steve McNees – 318
9. Joe Jakubick – 300
10. Jami Bosley – 276

Steals
1. Jimmal Ball – 242
2. Joe Jakubick – 189
3. Nate Linhart – 186
4. Eric McLaughlin – 177
5. Jami Bosley – 165
6. Shawn Roberts – 156
7. Andy Hipsher – 140
8. Roy Coleman – 136
9. Alex Abreu – 135
10. Cedrick Middleton – 131

Blocked shots
1. Zeke Marshall – 246
2. Enrique Freeman – 182
3. Romeo Travis – 165
4. Bruce Weinkein – 109
5. George Phillips – 107
6. Rob Preston – 86
7. Joel Price – 82
8. David Mason – 76
9. Quade Milum – 65
10. Mike Bardo – 59
10. Demetrius Treadwell – 59

== Notable alumni ==
=== International players ===
- Kwan Cheatham (born 1995), basketball player for Ironi Nes Ziona of the Israel Basketball Premier League
- Demetrius Treadwell (born 1991), basketball player in the Israel Basketball Premier League
- Loren Christian Jackson (born 1996), basketball player for Legia Warszawa of the Polish Basketball League
- Tavian Dunn-Martin (born 1998), basketball player for Saskatoon Mamba of the CEBL
- Xavier Castañeda (born 2000), basketball player for Lavrio Megabolt of the Greek Basket League

=== NBA draft selections ===
The following former Akron players were selected in the NBA draft:

- Lou Arko
- Nate Barnett
- Marcel Boyce
- Enrique Freeman
- Fritz Nagy
- Len Paul
- Bill Turner
- Joe Wahl
