= Case Western Reserve University School of Law alumni =

Following is a list of notable alumni of the Case Western Reserve University School of Law.

== Academia ==
- Kenneth B. Davis, former dean of University of Wisconsin Law School
- Lee Fisher, dean of Cleveland–Marshall College of Law as of 2016, former attorney general of Ohio, former lieutenant governor of Ohio
- Amos N. Guiora, professor, S.J. Quinney College of Law, University of Utah
- Ted Gup, professor of journalism, Emerson College
- Kevin G. Nealer, professor, Georgetown School of Business, Fulbright Professor of trade law and policy in the People's Republic of China
- Suzanne Elise Walsh, 19th president of Bennett College
- Andrew Zashin, family law attorney, legal writer and commentator; adjunct professor of Law at Case Western Reserve University School of Law

== Business and industry ==
- Elizabeth M. Boyer, lawyer, writer/publisher, and feminist founder of Women's Equity Action League
- Barry Meyer, former chairman of Warner Bros. Entertainment
- Robert L. Stark (born 1951), real estate developer and CEO of Stark Enterprises
- Mark Weinberger, former chairman and CEO of Ernst & Young and former assistant secretary of the Treasury for Tax Policy

== Government ==
- William Daroff, chief executive officer of the Conference of Presidents of Major American Jewish Organizations, and former appointee to US Commission for the Preservation of America's Heritage Abroad and chief lobbyist for Jewish Federations of North America
- Martin J. Gruenberg, chairman of the Federal Deposit Insurance Corporation
- Capricia Marshall, former chief of Protocol of the United States
- Nicole Nason, former administrator, National Highway Traffic Safety Administration
- Kevin G. Nealer, member of the President's Intelligence Advisory Board
- John F. Sopko, special inspector general for Afghanistan Reconstruction
- Charles Z. Wick, director of the United States Information Agency (existed from 1953 to 1999) under President Ronald Reagan

== Judicial ==
- Susan G. Braden, chief judge, United States Court of Federal Claims
- Rebecca Dallet, justice, Wisconsin Supreme Court
- Emerich B. Freed, judge, United States District Court for the Northern District of Ohio
- Ben Charles Green, judge, United States District Court for the Northern District of Ohio
- Lynn B. Griffith, justice, Supreme Court of Ohio (1962–1964)
- Thomas J. Herbert, associate justice of the Supreme Court of Ohio, attorney general of Ohio, former governor of Ohio
- Jeffrey Hjelm, justice, Maine Supreme Judicial Court
- Alvin Krenzler, judge, United States District Court for the Northern District of Ohio
- Blanche Krupansky, justice, Supreme Court of Ohio (1981–1983)
- Robert B. Krupansky, judge, United States Court of Appeals for the Sixth Circuit
- John James McConnell Jr., judge for the United States District Court for the District of Rhode Island
- Kathleen M. O'Malley, circuit judge for the United States Court of Appeals for the Federal Circuit
- Edmund A. Sargus Jr., judge for the United States District Court for the Southern District of Ohio
- Leslie Crocker Snyder, judge, New York State Supreme Court (New York's trial court), and former candidate for Manhattan District Attorney
- Joseph F. Spaniol Jr., 18th clerk of the Supreme Court of the United States
- Don John Young, former judge, United States District Court for the Northern District of Ohio

== Law ==
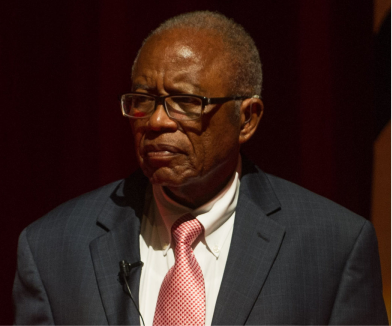
Attorney Fred Gray represented Rosa Parks, Rev. Martin Luther King Jr., and the Tuskegee syphilis experiment victims in his career. He marched in Selma to Montgomery.

=== Attorney ===
- Nan Aron, public interest lawyer, civil rights advocate, and president of the Alliance for Justice
- Fred Gray, attorney to the Rev. Dr. Martin Luther King Jr., and Rosa Parks
- Jeff Herman, church sex abuse attorney, Catholic Church sexual abuse cases
- C.B. King, civil rights attorney in the South during the civil rights movement
- Mike Lebowitz, attorney, legal pioneer in military expression, military law
- Andrew Zashin, family law attorney, legal writer and commentator; adjunct professor of Law at Case Western Reserve University School of Law

=== Attorney general ===
- Marc Dann, former attorney general of Ohio
- Lee Fisher, former attorney general of Ohio, former lieutenant governor of Ohio, and dean of Cleveland–Marshall College of Law as of 2016
- Thomas J. Herbert, attorney general of Ohio, former governor of Ohio, and associate justice of the Supreme Court of Ohio
- Jim Petro, former attorney general of Ohio

=== District attorney ===
- Lee Fisher, former attorney general of Ohio, former lieutenant governor of Ohio, and dean of Cleveland–Marshall College of Law as of 2016
- Ray Gricar, former district attorney of Centre County, Pennsylvania

== Politics ==
- Ann Womer Benjamin, director of the Northeast Ohio Council on Higher Education, former director of the Ohio Department of Insurance
- Justin Bibb, 58th and current mayor of Cleveland
- Oliver P. Bolton, former member of the U.S. House of Representatives
- Thomas A. Burke, former U.S. senator and mayor of Cleveland
- Mohamed Ibn Chambas, secretary-general, African, Caribbean and Pacific Group of States
- François-Philippe Champagne, Canadian Minister of Foreign Affairs
- William Daroff, chief executive officer of the Conference of Presidents of Major American Jewish Organizations, and former chief lobbyist for Jewish Federations of North America and appointee to US Commission for the Preservation of America's Heritage Abroad
- Lincoln Díaz-Balart, former member of the U.S. House of Representatives
- Lee Fisher, former lieutenant governor of Ohio, former attorney general of Ohio, and dean of Cleveland–Marshall College of Law as of 2016
- Herman Goldner, mayor of St. Petersburg, Florida, 1961–1967, 1971–1973
- Tim Grendell, Ohio state senator
- Thomas J. Herbert, former governor of Ohio, attorney general of Ohio, and associate justice of the Supreme Court of Ohio
- Martin Hoke, former member of the U.S. House of Representatives
- Stephanie Tubbs Jones, member of the U.S. House of Representatives
- Ron Klein, former member of the U.S. House of Representatives
- Claire Levy, executive director of the Colorado Center on Law and Policy and former member of the Colorado House of Representatives
- Josh Mandel, Ohio State Treasurer
- Roscoe C. McCulloch, former U.S. senator and member of the U.S. House of Representatives
- Charles W. Stage, former member of the Ohio House of Representatives
- Michael Turner, member of the U.S. House of Representatives
- Charles Vanik, former member of the U.S. House of Representatives
- Wayne Wheeler, prominent prohibition leader and lobbyist/general counsel to the Anti-Saloon League
- Stephen M. Young, former U.S. senator

== Sports ==
- William J. Laub, mayor of Akron, Ohio, professional football player, professional football coach
- Milton C. Portmann, professional football player, decorated World War I Army officer, attorney
