= Daroff =

Surname list

Daroff is a surname. Notable people with the surname include:

- Robert B. Daroff (1936–2025), American neurologist
- William Daroff (born 1968), American lawyer and Jewish communal leader

== See also ==
- Danoff
