= Capozzi =

Capozzi is an Italian surname. Notable people with the surname include:

- Alberto Capozzi (1886–1945), actor
- Anthony P. Capozzi (born 1945), attorney
- Catherine Capozzi, guitarist
- Deborah Capozzi, sailor
- Herb Capozzi (1925–2011), sports team manager and politician
- John Capozzi (born 1956), politician

== See also ==
- Altemio Sanchez § Exoneration of Anthony Capozzi
- Lil Debbie, born Jordan Capozzi
