= 1992 United States Shadow Representative election in the District of Columbia =

- November 3, 1992
- Turnout: 67.9% pp
Nominee	Charles Moreland	Paul J. McAllister	Gloria Corn
Party	Democratic	DC Statehood	Republican
Popular vote	135,592	25,399	25,035
Percentage	70.0%	13.1%	12.9%
- Results by ward: Moreland—40–50% Moreland—60–70% Moreland—70–80% Moreland—80–90%
Shadow Representative before election
Charles Moreland
Democratic
Elected Shadow Representative
Charles Moreland
Democratic

On November 3, 1992, the District of Columbia held a U.S. House of Representatives election for its shadow representative. Unlike its non-voting delegate, the shadow representative is only recognized by the district and is not officially sworn or seated. One-term incumbent and inaugural office-holder Charles Moreland ran for reelection and won.

== Primary elections ==
Primary elections were held on September 13.

=== Democratic primary ===
==== Candidates ====
- John Capozzi, IT professional and member of the Democratic Statehood Committee from Ward 6
- Charles Moreland, attorney and incumbent Shadow Representative from Ward 7

==== Campaign ====
Moreland, the incumbent Shadow Representative and inaugural office-holder, was challenged in the Democratic primary by John Capozzi. Moreland had been the subject of a number of controversies since he entered office. In September 1990, prior to his first election, news broke that Moreland had not filed federal or district taxes for at least five years. Moreland claimed this was a political statement intended to highlight the District's lack of representation. In February 1991, Moreland failed to appear at a court hearing over an unpaid loan made to purchase a 1983 Jaguar. Though a bench warrant was issued, Moreland was not taken into custody and during his reelection campaign he claimed to have resolved the loan issue.

Capozzi entered the primary critical of Moreland. He claimed Moreland's focus on community organizing was unsuccessful and the cause of statehood would be better served with more time spent on Capitol Hill lobbying legislators. Capozzi was critical of Moreland's strategy of tax evasion saying that it alienated members of Congress. Capozzi even insinuated that Moreland's failure to pay taxes was meant primarily for personal gain by saying: "This is supposed to be about lobbying for statehood, not some kind of 'Don Quixote' ride to avoid paying taxes," During the primary campaign, Moreland was reprimanded by the Office of Campaign Finance and Ethics for submitting campaign finance reports weeks after they were due. Moreland was also ordered to take down nearly 200 campaign posters for having insufficient information on their financing.

==== Results ====
District of Columbia Shadow Representative Democratic primary election, 1992
Party	Candidate	Votes	%
Democratic	Charles Moreland (incumbent)	30,561	59.40
Democratic	John Capozzi	19,670	38.23
Write-in		1,216	2.36
Total votes		51,447	100.00

Democratic primary results by ward: Moreland—70–80% Moreland—60–70% Moreland—50–60% Moreland—40–50% Capozzi—50–60% Capozzi—70–80%

==== Results by ward ====
Ward	Turnout	Charles J. Moreland		John James Capozzi		Write-ins		Total Votes
Ward	Turnout	Percentage	Votes	Percentage	Votes	Percentage	Votes	Total Votes
Ward 1	12.4%	55.80%	1,857	41.68%	1,387	2.52%	84	3,328
Ward 2	17.1%	42.21%	1,534	54.84%	1,993	2.94%	107	3,634
Ward 3	13.0%	22.76%	735	73.62%	2,378	3.62%	117	3,230
Ward 4	37.8%	61.16%	7,833	36.84%	4,718	2.01%	257	12,808
Ward 5	17.3%	69.43%	4,006	28.42%	1,640	2.15%	124	5,770
Ward 6	15.8%	49.14%	2,346	48.01%	2,292	2.85%	136	4,774
Ward 7	33.5%	65.79%	6,827	32.25%	3,347	1.96%	203	10,377
Ward 8	38.6%	72.06%	5,423	25.45%	1,915	2.50%	188	7,526

=== Statehood Party primary ===
==== Candidates ====
- Faith, activist from Ward 1
- Paul J. McAllister, party Secretary-Treasurer from Ward 5

==== Campaign ====
Both candidates said they would attempt to build grassroots support for statehood though Faith claimed she would build a multiethnic and multireligious coalition.

==== Results ====
Statehood primary results by ward: Tie McAllister—40–50% McAllister—50–60% McAllister—60–70%

District of Columbia Shadow Representative Statehood Party primary election, 1992
Party	Candidate	Votes	%
DC Statehood	Paul J. McAllister	128	52.46
DC Statehood	Faith	84	34.43
Write-in		32	13.11
Total votes		244	100.00

=== Republican primary ===
No candidates appeared on the Republican primary ballot and only write-in votes were cast.

== Other candidates ==
A Republican candidate achieved ballot access through write-ins in the primary.

- Gloria R. Corn (Republican), ANC Commissioner in Ward 3

== General election ==
The general election took place on November 3. Both challengers criticized Moreland's nonpayment of taxes as ineffective and insincere. During the campaign, Corn opposed statehood and said that if elected she would work to get more budget autonomy for DC as well as increased federal funding for anti-crime efforts.

=== Results ===
General election results by ward: Moreland—40–50% Moreland—60–70% Moreland—70–80% Moreland—80–90%

General election results
Party	Candidate	Votes	%	±%
Democratic	Charles J. Moreland (incumbent)	135,592	69.96	−3.57
DC Statehood	Paul J. McAllister	25,399	13.10	−0.79
Republican	Gloria R. Corn	25,035	12.92	−1.24
Write-in		7,800	4.02	
Total votes		193,826	100.00%	

==== Results by ward ====
Ward	Turnout	Charles J. Moreland (Democratic)		Paul J. McAllister (Statehood)		Gloria R. Corn (Republican)		Write-ins		Total Votes
Ward	Turnout	Percentage	Votes	Percentage	Votes	Percentage	Votes	Percentage	Votes	Total Votes
Ward 1	59.62%	67.58%	14,982	16.47%	3,651	11.53%	2,555	4.42%	980	22,168
Ward 2	64.32%	60.83%	14,463	11.66%	2,773	21.92%	5,212	5.58%	1,327	23,775
Ward 3	72.08%	48.98%	14,846	9.09%	2,754	32.59%	9,878	9.34%	2,832	30,310
Ward 4	67.85%	77.29%	22,272	13.93%	4,015	6.00%	1,730	2.77%	799	28,816
Ward 5	63.10%	77.31%	19,543	15.27%	3,859	5.53%	1,399	1.89%	478	25,279
Ward 6	61.95%	70.25%	17,046	14.04%	3,406	11.54%	2,800	4.18%	1,014	24,266
Ward 7	62.93%	82.87%	20,127	12.17%	2,955	3.94%	957	1.02%	247	24,286
Ward 8	53.87	82.49%	12,313	13.31%	1,986	3.38%	504	0.82%	123	14,926
Totals	67.88%	69.96%	135,592	13.10%	25,399	12.92%	25,035	4.02%	7,800	231,445
