= UT Law =

UT Law may refer to:

- University of Toledo College of Law
- University of Tennessee College of Law
- University of Texas School of Law
