= 1994 United States Shadow Representative election in the District of Columbia =

United States Shadow Representative election in the District of Columbia, 1994
- November 8, 1994
- Turnout: 51.5% pp
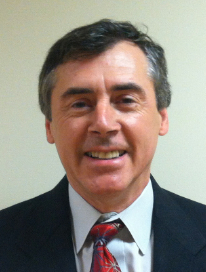

| Nominee | John Capozzi | Edward D. Turpin |
| Party | Democratic | Republican |
| Popular vote | 104,532 | 18,756 |
| Percentage | 68.7% | 12.3% |
| Nominee | Paul McAllister | Keith Mitchell (Withdrawn) |
| Party | DC Statehood | Independent |
| Popular vote | 14,147 | 13,190 |
| Percentage | 9.3% | 8.7% |
Shadow Representative before election
Charles Moreland
Democratic
Elected Shadow Representative
John Capozzi
Democratic

On November 8, 1994, the District of Columbia held a U.S. House of Representatives election for its shadow representative. Unlike its non-voting delegate, the shadow representative is only recognized by the district and is not officially sworn or seated. Two-term incumbent and inaugural office-holder Charles Moreland declined to run for reelection and was succeeded by fellow Democrat John Capozzi.

== Primary elections ==
Primary elections were held on September 13.

=== Democratic primary ===
==== Candidates ====
- John Capozzi, IT professional and candidate for Shadow Representative in 1992.

===== Disqualified =====
- Keith Mitchell, director of the Community for Creative Non-Violence

===== Declined to run =====
- Charles Moreland, incumbent Shadow Representative

==== Results ====
Two Democratic candidates filed to appear on the ballot. Keith Mitchell, director of a charity that worked with the homeless, was disqualified from the ballot because on his ballot petition, a number of homeless voters signed and gave their mailing addresses rather than the addresses where they were registered. After he was disqualified from the primary ballot, Mitchell announced he would run as an independent candidate in the general election

District of Columbia Shadow Representative Democratic primary election, 1994
| Party | Candidate | Votes | % |
|---|---|---|---|
| Democratic | John Capozzi | 85,366 | 94.36 |
| Write-in | | 5,101 | 5.64 |
| Total votes | | 90,467 | 100.00 |

=== Other primaries ===
Primaries were held for the Republican and Statehood parties but no candidates were on the ballot and only write-in votes were cast. Turpin and McAllister of the Republican and Statehood parties, respectively, both were nominated through write-in votes. McAllister was also nominated for delegate through write-ins but only accepted the nomination for Shadow Representative.

== Other candidates ==
- Paul McAllister (DC Statehood), political researcher and candidate for Shadow Representative in 1992
- Keith Mitchell (Independent), director of the Community for Creative Non-Violence
- Edward D. Turpin (Republican), teacher

== General election ==
The general election took place on November 15. Keith Mitchell, who ran as an independent after being disqualified from the Democratic primary ballot, withdrew from the race prior to election day. Turpin stated that he opposed statehood for DC and said that increased employment was more important than statehood. He also promised to create 1,000 jobs if elected.

=== Results ===
General election results
| Party | Candidate | Votes | % | ±% |
|---|---|---|---|---|
| Democratic | John Capozzi | 104,532 | 68.65 | −1.31 |
| Republican | Edward D. Turpin | 18,756 | 12.32 | −0.60 |
| DC Statehood | Paul McAllister | 14,147 | 9.29 | −3.81 |
| Independent | Keith Mitchell (withdrawn) | 13,190 | 8.66 | +8.66 |
| Write-in | | 1,644 | 1.08 | -2.94 |
| Total votes | | 152,269 | 100.00% | |
