= Headache Disorders =

1983 non-fiction book edited byJoel R. Saper

- Editor: Joel R. Saper
- Publisher: John Wright PSG
- Publication date: 1983
- ISBN: 9780723670100
- OCLC: 8306272

Headache Disorders: Current Concepts and Treatment Strategies is a 1983 medical text, edited by Joel R. Saper and published by John Wright PSG.

== General references ==
- Bana, Dhirendra S. (1983-08-26). "Headache Disorders: Current Concepts and Treatment Strategies". JAMA: The Journal of the American Medical Association. 250 (8): 1103. doi:10.1001/jama.1983.03340080075042. ISSN 0098-7484.
- Raskin, Neil H. (November 1983). "Headache Disorders: Current Concepts and Treatment Strategies". Neurology. 33 (11): 1536. doi:10.1212/WNL.33.11.1536-b. ISSN 0028-3878.
- Stein, Harold J. (1983-09-15). "Book Review: Headache Disorders: Current concepts and treatment strategies". New England Journal of Medicine. 309 (11): 675–675. doi:10.1056/NEJM198309153091128. ISSN 0028-4793.
