= Anthony Capozzi =

Anthony Capozzi may refer to:

- Anthony P. Capozzi (born 1945), American trial attorney and political consultant
- Anthony Capozzi (wrongful conviction)
