= James G. Carr =

American judge (born 1940)

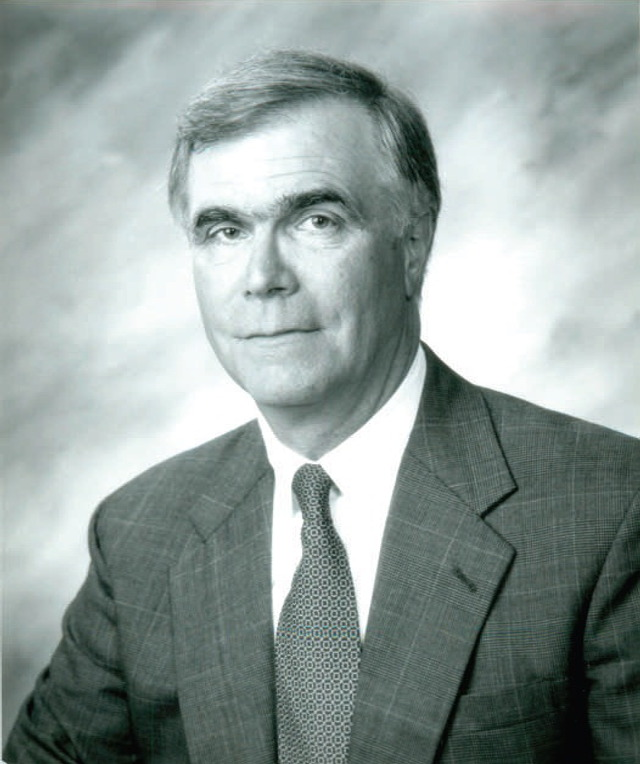

Senior Judge of the United States District Court for the Northern District of Ohio
- Incumbent
- Assumed office June 1, 2010

Chief Judge of the United States District Court for the Northern District of Ohio
- In office December 21, 2004 – June 1, 2010
- Preceded by: Paul Ramon Matia
- Succeeded by: Solomon Oliver Jr.

Judge of the United States Foreign Intelligence Surveillance Court
- In office May 19, 2002 – May 18, 2008
- Appointed by: William Rehnquist
- Preceded by: seat established
- Succeeded by: Mary A. McLaughlin

Judge of the United States District Court for the Northern District of Ohio
- In office May 9, 1994 – June 1, 2010
- Appointed by: Bill Clinton
- Preceded by: Richard B. McQuade Jr.
- Succeeded by: Jeffrey J. Helmick

Magistrate Judge of the United States District Court for the Northern District of Ohio
- In office 1979–1994

Personal details
- Born: November 14, 1940 (age 85) Boston, Massachusetts, U.S.
- Education: Kenyon College (BA); Harvard University (LLB)

James Gray Carr (born November 14, 1940) is a senior United States district judge of the United States District Court for the Northern District of Ohio.

== Education and career ==
Carr was born in Boston. He received a Bachelor of Arts degree from Kenyon College in 1962, and a Bachelor of Laws from Harvard Law School in 1969. He was in private practice of law in Chicago, Illinois from 1966 to 1968. He was a staff attorney of the Cook County Legal Assistance Foundation from 1968 to 1970. He was then an adjunct professor at the Chicago-Kent College of Law (Illinois Institute of Technology) in 1969, and at Loyola University Chicago School of Law in 1970. He was an associate professor at the University of Toledo College of Law from 1970 to 1979. While he was a professor, Carr was also an assistant prosecutor at the Lucas County Prosecutor's Office in Ohio from 1972 to 1973.

=== Federal judicial service ===
Carr was a United States magistrate judge of the United States District Court for the Northern District of Ohio in 1979, becoming the first full-time magistrate judge in Toledo. On January 27, 1994, he was nominated to the U.S. District Court for the Northern District of Ohio by President Bill Clinton to a seat vacated by Judge Richard B. McQuade, Jr. He was confirmed by the United States Senate on May 6, 1994, and received his commission on May 9. On May 19, 2002, Chief Justice William Rehnquist appointed Carr to the Foreign Intelligence Surveillance Court. Carr served as chief judge of the District Court from December 21, 2004 to June 1, 2010. His term on the FISA Court expired in 2008. Carr took senior status on June 1, 2010 and inactive senior status on July 1, 2025.

== Notable case ==
In April 2017, Carr ruled that Ohio could not fine railroad companies for blocking roads.

Legal offices
Preceded by Richard B. McQuade, Jr.	Judge of the United States District Court for the Northern District of Ohio; 1994–2010	Succeeded by Jeffrey J. Helmick
New seat	Judge of the United States Foreign Intelligence Surveillance Court; 2002–2008	Succeeded by Mary A. McLaughlin
Preceded by Paul Ramon Matia	Chief Judge of the United States District Court for the Northern District of Ohio; 2004–2010	Succeeded by Solomon Oliver Jr.
