= James R. Knepp II =

American judge (born 1964)

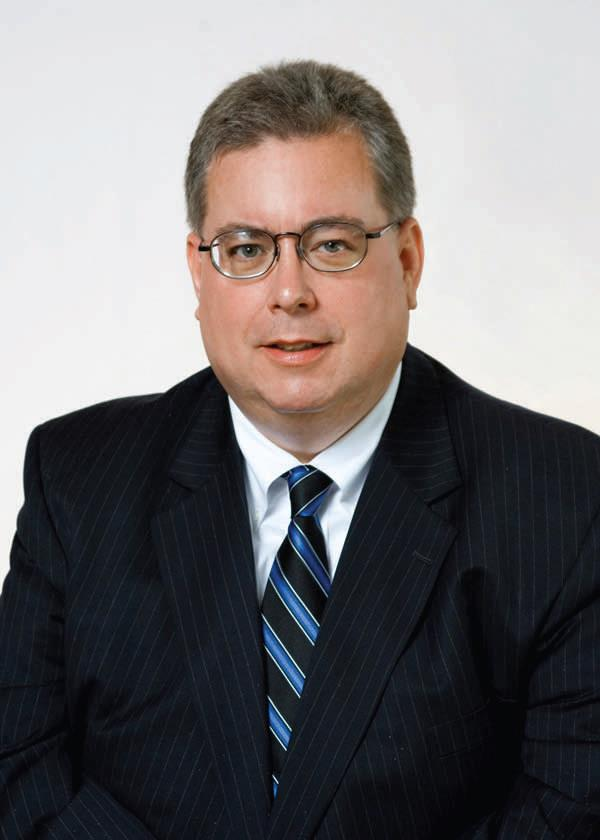

Judge of the United States District Court for the Northern District of Ohio
- Incumbent
- Assumed office November 13, 2020
- Appointed by: Donald Trump
- Preceded by: Jack Zouhary

Magistrate Judge of the United States District Court for the Northern District of Ohio
- In office July 30, 2010 – November 13, 2020

Personal details
- Born: James Ray Knepp II; 1964 (age 60–61); Akron, Ohio, U.S.
- Education: Mount Union College (BA); Bowling Green State University (MA); University of Toledo (JD)

James Ray Knepp II (born 1964) is a United States district judge of the United States District Court for the Northern District of Ohio and a former United States magistrate judge of the same court.

== Education ==
Knepp earned his Bachelor of Arts, magna cum laude, from Mount Union College, his Master of Arts from Bowling Green State University, and his Juris Doctor, summa cum laude, from the University of Toledo College of Law, where he was a member of the editorial board for the University of Toledo Law Review.

== Career ==
Upon graduating from law school, Knepp served as a law clerk to Judge John William Potter of the United States District Court for the Northern District of Ohio. He then worked as a litigation attorney for fifteen years with the law firm Robison, Curphey & O’Connell in Toledo, Ohio.

=== Federal judicial service ===
Knepp served as a United States magistrate judge of the United States District Court for the Northern District of Ohio, a position he was appointed to on July 30, 2010, and left in 2020 upon becoming a district judge.

On February 26, 2020, President Donald Trump announced his intent to nominate Knepp to serve as a United States district judge of the United States District Court for the Northern District of Ohio. On March 3, 2020, his nomination was sent to the Senate. President Trump nominated Knepp to the seat vacated by Judge Jack Zouhary, who assumed senior status on July 1, 2019. A hearing on his nomination before the Senate Judiciary Committee was held on July 29, 2020. On September 17, 2020, his nomination was reported out of committee by a 17–5 vote. On November 9, 2020, the United States Senate invoked cloture on his nomination by a 62–23 vote. On November 10, 2020, his nomination was confirmed by a 64–24 vote. He received his judicial commission on November 13, 2020. He was sworn in on November 19, 2020.

Legal offices
Preceded by Jack Zouhary	Judge of the United States District Court for the Northern District of Ohio; 2020–present	Incumbent
