= Nicholas Joseph Walinski Jr. =

American judge

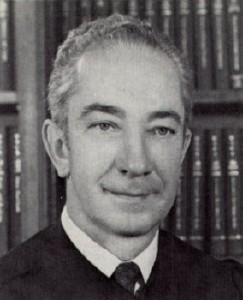

Senior Judge of the United States District Court for the Northern District of Ohio
- In office December 1, 1985 – December 24, 1992

Judge of the United States District Court for the Northern District of Ohio
- In office October 21, 1970 – December 1, 1985
- Appointed by: Richard Nixon
- Preceded by: Girard Edward Kalbfleisch
- Succeeded by: Richard B. McQuade Jr.

Personal details
- Born: Nicholas Joseph Walinski Jr. November 29, 1920 Toledo, Ohio, U.S.
- Died: December 24, 1992 (aged 72)
- Education: University of Toledo (B.S.); University of Toledo College of Law (LL.B.)

Nicholas Joseph Walinski Jr. (November 29, 1920 – December 24, 1992) was a United States district judge of the United States District Court for the Northern District of Ohio.

== Education and career ==
Born in Toledo, Ohio, Walinski was a United States Navy lieutenant during World War II and its aftermath, from 1942 to 1948. He received a Bachelor of Science degree from the University of Toledo in 1949 and a Bachelor of Laws from the University of Toledo College of Law in 1951. He was a United States Naval Reserve Captain from 1948 to 1971. He was an assistant law director for the City of Toledo from 1953 to 1958. He was a municipal judge of the City of Toledo from 1958 to 1964. He was a judge of the Court of Common Pleas for Lucas County, Ohio, from 1964 to 1970.

== Federal judicial service ==
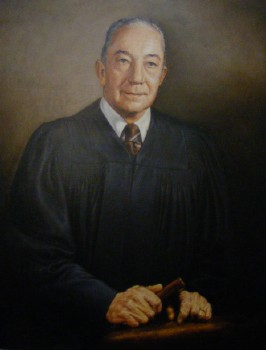
Judicial portrait of Walinski, c. 1985.

Walinski was nominated by President Richard Nixon on October 7, 1970, to a seat on the United States District Court for the Northern District of Ohio vacated by Judge Girard Edward Kalbfleisch. He was confirmed by the United States Senate on October 13, 1970, and received his commission on October 21, 1970. He assumed senior status on December 1, 1985. Walinski served in that capacity until his death on December 24, 1992.

== Sources ==
Legal offices
Preceded by Girard Edward Kalbfleisch	Judge of the United States District Court for the Northern District of Ohio; 1970–1985	Succeeded by Richard B. McQuade Jr.
