= Richard B. McQuade Jr. =

American judge

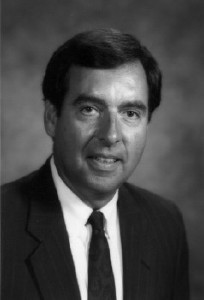

Judge of the United States District Court for the Northern District of Ohio
- In office September 15, 1986 – September 30, 1989
- Appointed by: Ronald Reagan
- Preceded by: Nicholas Joseph Walinski Jr.
- Succeeded by: James G. Carr

Judge of the Ohio Court of Common Pleas
- In office 1978–1986

Personal details
- Born: Richard B. McQuade Jr. April 7, 1940 (age 85) Toledo, Ohio, U.S.
- Education: University of Toledo (BA, (JD)

Richard B. McQuade Jr. (born April 7, 1940) is an American attorney and jurist who served as a former United States district judge of the United States District Court for the Northern District of Ohio.

== Early life and education ==
Born on April 7, 1940, in Toledo, Ohio, McQuade received a Bachelor of Arts degree from the University of Toledo in 1961 and a Juris Doctor from the University of Toledo College of Law in 1965.

== Career ==
He was an assistant prosecutor in Fulton County, Ohio from 1966 to 1968. He was the prosecuting attorney of Fulton County from 1969 to 1978. He was in private practice in Swanton, Ohio from 1966 to 1978. He was a judge of the Ohio Court of Common Pleas from 1978 to 1986.

On July 28, 1986, McQuade was nominated by President Ronald Reagan to a seat on the United States District Court for the Northern District of Ohio vacated by Judge Nicholas Joseph Walinski Jr. McQuade was confirmed by the United States Senate on September 12, 1986, and received his commission on September 15, 1986. McQuade served until his resignation, on September 30, 1989.

Following his resignation from the federal bench, McQuade became president and CEO of Blue Cross/Blue Shield of Ohio. He is also a trustee of the University of Toledo.

Legal offices
Preceded by Nicholas Joseph Walinski Jr.	Judge of the United States District Court for the Northern District of Ohio; 1986–1989	Succeeded by James G. Carr
