= Danoff =

Danoff is a surname. Notable people with the surname include:

- Bettye Danoff (1923–2011), American golfer
- Bill Danoff (born 1946), American songwriter and singer
- Owen Danoff (born 1989), American singer-songwriter
- William Danoff (born 1959/1960), American money manager

== See also ==
- Daroff
