= Jeffrey J. Helmick =

American judge (born 1960)

Jeffrey James Helmick
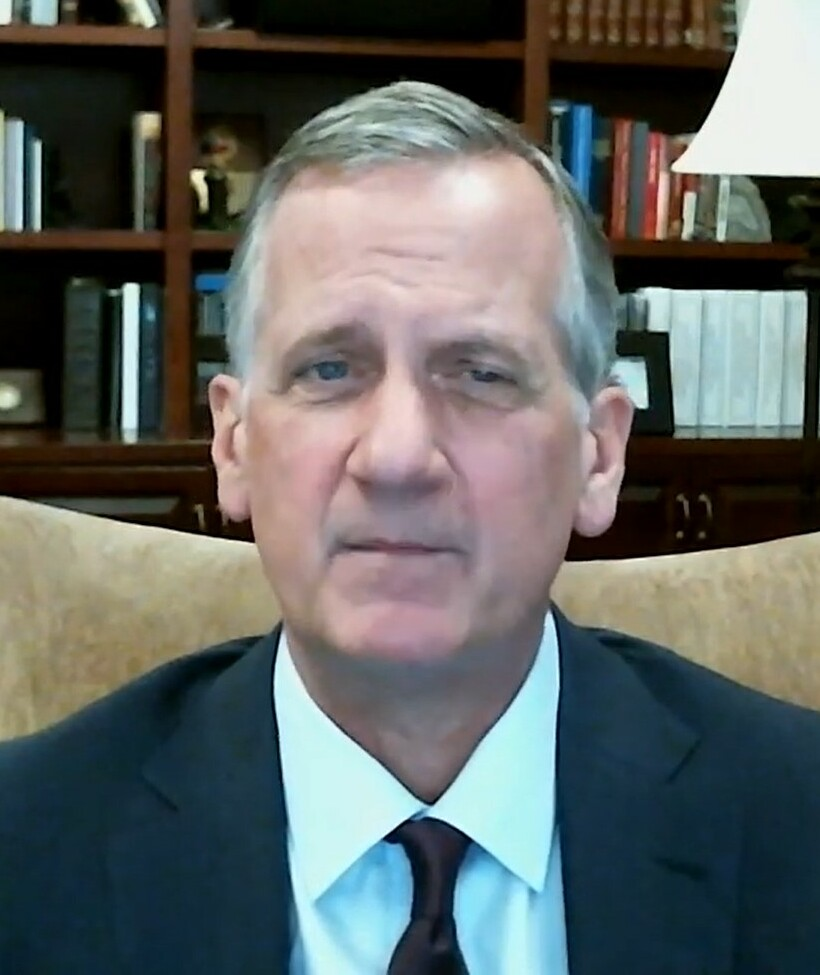
- Helmick in 2021

Judge of the United States District Court for the Northern District of Ohio
- Incumbent
- Assumed office June 7, 2012
- Appointed by: Barack Obama
- Preceded by: James G. Carr

Personal details
- Born: September 6, 1960 (age 65) Toledo, Ohio, U.S.
- Education: University of Michigan (BA); Ohio State University (JD)

Jeffrey James Helmick (born September 6, 1960) is a United States district judge of the United States District Court for the Northern District of Ohio.

== Early life and education ==
Born in Toledo, Ohio, Helmick earned a Bachelor of Arts degree in 1983 from the University of Michigan and a Juris Doctor in 1988 from the Ohio State University Moritz College of Law.

== Career ==
From 1988 until 1989, Helmick worked as an associate at the law firm Marshall & Melhorn. From 1989 until 1995, he worked as a principal in a law firm, and then he was a principal in another law firm from 1996 until 1998. Helmick co-founded his own law firm in 1998 and concentrated in federal criminal defense litigation.

=== Federal judicial service ===
On May 11, 2011, President Barack Obama nominated Helmick to a seat on the United States District Court for the Northern District of Ohio that had been vacated by Judge James G. Carr, who assumed senior status in June 2010. He was recommended for the post by senators George Voinovich and Sherrod Brown. On February 15, 2012, Helmick received a hearing before the United States Senate Committee on the Judiciary, with the support of Sherrod Brown and Voinovich's successor, Rob Portman. On March 8, 2012, Helmick's nomination was reported out of committee by an 11–6 vote. In the Senate debate over Helmick's nomination, there was some controversy over Helmick's representation of accused terrorist and Toledo terror plot organizer Wassim Mazloum in 2009 as well as an ethics case that had gone to the Supreme Court of Ohio. Sen. Chuck Grassley in particular opposed Helmick for his role as a court-appointed attorney for Mazloum, who was ultimately convicted. However, Helmick was backed by both Democratic Ohio Senator Sherrod Brown and Republican Ohio Senator Rob Portman. On June 6, 2012, the United States Senate confirmed Helmick by a 62–36 vote. He received his commission on June 7, 2012.

=== Notable ruling ===
In a 15-page ruling on December 15, 2020, Helmick ruled that Christian schools are not exempt from Toledo's order requiring schools to stay closed through January 11 due to the COVID-19 pandemic.

Legal offices
Preceded by James G. Carr	Judge of the United States District Court for the Northern District of Ohio; 2012–present	Incumbent
