= Robert B. Daroff =

American neurologist (1936–2025)

Robert Barry Daroff (August 3, 1936 – January 12, 2025) was an American neurologist who was a pioneer of ocular motor research. He was a neurologist in Cleveland, Ohio, connected to University Hospitals Cleveland Medical Center. He was also Professor and Chair Emeritus of Neurology at Case Western Reserve University School of Medicine.

== Background ==
Daroff was born in New York City. His father was Charlie Daroff, one of four brothers who owned H. Daroff and Sons, a Philadelphia company that manufactured Botany 500 clothing. When Daroff was ten years old he left public school and attended the Riverside Military Academy in Gainesville, Georgia. At the age of 16 he enrolled at the University of Chicago, but after one year transferred to the University of Pennsylvania, to be closer to home. While at the University of Chicago he was roommates with Carl Sagan. After graduating in 1957 Daroff attended medical school at the University of Pennsylvania and graduated in 1961. He had three sons, Charles Daroff, Robert Daroff, Jr., MD, and William Daroff, chief executive officer of the Conference of Presidents of Major American Jewish Organizations. Daroff died on January 12, 2025, at the age of 88.

== Career ==
Daroff served in the United States Army Medical Corps from 1965 until 1967, attaining the rank of captain. He was on the faculty of the Departments of Neurology and Ophthalmology at the University of Miami from 1968 to 1980. While in Miami, he began to study the trajectories of normal and abnormal eye movements with Louis Dell'Osso and other experts in systems control. He was the editor-in-chief of the medical journal Neurology from 1987 to 1997. He served as president of the American Neurological Association and the American Headache Society. He treated several members of the royal families in Saudi Arabia and other Persian Gulf states. He was a founder of the Rocky Mountain Neuro-Ophthalmology Society, the forerunner of the North American Neuro-Ophthalmology Society (NANOS).
