= Kevin G. Nealer =

American businessperson and political figure

- Education: University of Michigan, Case Western Reserve University School of Law
- Organisation: The Scowcroft Group

Kevin G. Nealer is an American businessperson and political figure. He is currently a principal and partner in The Scowcroft Group, specializing in financial services, risk analysis, direct investment and trade policy.

== Career ==
Nealer received his undergraduate degree from the University of Michigan and his Juris Doctor degree from Case Western Reserve University School of Law.

A trade attorney and former State Department officer, Nealer served as trade policy advisor to the Senate Democratic Leadership from 1982 to 1987.

Before joining The Scowcroft Group, Nealer advised multinational clients on investment issues, project finance, and trade law/policy as a principal in the consulting affiliate of Washington's largest law firm, and as vice president for corporate affairs with a leading government strategies practice.

On October 1, 2014, U.S. President Barack Obama appointed Nealer as a Member of the President’s Intelligence Advisory Board.

A Fulbright professor in the People's Republic of China (1990-1991), Nealer has served as a lecturer, program moderator, and adjunct professor of trade law and policy at the Georgetown University McDonough School of Business. A member of the Council on Foreign Relations, he was an author of the council’s report Beginning the Journey: China, The United States and the WTO, and other articles on political economy.

He is a member of the board of the Australian American Leadership Dialogue, the International Advisory Board of Ancora Capital Management, Pte, Ltd., and the International Affairs Visiting Committee of Case Western Reserve University. He is a consultant to the U.S. defense and intelligence communities on trade and economic security issues, and advised the Obama campaign on international economic and Asia policy.

Following his confirmation by the United States Senate on December 14, 2010, Nealer was sworn in as a member of the Board of Directors of the Overseas Private Investment Corporation, the development finance agency of the US government, where he served on the Audit and Governance Committees.

He is currently a principal and partner in The Scowcroft Group.

In 2024, he was on the advisory board of Michigan in Washington by the University of Michigan. He was still on the Australian American Council, the international advisory board of Ancora Capital Management, and on the International Affairs Visiting Committee at Case Western Reserve. He is a non-resident expert at the Eisenhower Institute at Gettysburg College. He was on the Council on Foreign Relations. He is a senior advisor to the Center for Strategic & International Studies.

== See also ==
- Case Western Reserve University School of Law alumni
