= Jack Zouhary =

American judge (born 1951)

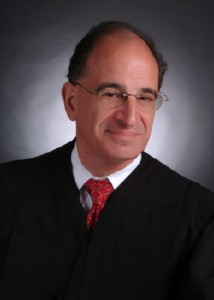
- Zouhary, c. 2008

Senior Judge of the United States District Court for the Northern District of Ohio
- Incumbent
- Assumed office July 1, 2019

Judge of the United States District Court for the Northern District of Ohio
- In office March 28, 2006 – July 1, 2019
- Appointed by: George W. Bush
- Preceded by: David A. Katz
- Succeeded by: James R. Knepp II

Personal details
- Born: December 18, 1951 (age 74) Toledo, Ohio, U.S.
- Education: Dartmouth College (BA); University of Toledo (JD)

Jack Zouhary (born December 18, 1951) is a senior United States district judge of the United States District Court for the Northern District of Ohio.

== Education and career ==
Zouhary was born in 1951 and raised in Toledo, Ohio as the son of a Syrian father and a Lebanese mother. He received a Bachelor of Arts degree from Dartmouth College in 1973. He received a Juris Doctor from the University of Toledo College of Law in 1976. He was in private practice in Toledo, Ohio from 2004 to 2005 with the law firm of Fuller & Henry and Robison, Curphey & O'Connell from 1976 to 1999. He was Senior Vice President and General Counsel, S.E. Johnson Companies, Inc. from 2000 to 2003. He was briefly a judge on the Lucas County Court of Common Pleas from 2005 to 2006. Governor Bob Taft appointed Zouhary to the Court of Common Pleas after Zouhary ran unsuccessfully in 2004.

== Federal judicial service ==
Zouhary was nominated by President George W. Bush on December 14, 2005, to a seat vacated by David A. Katz, upon the recommendation of Senators Mike DeWine and George Voinovich. The United States Senate confirmed him on March 16, 2006, by a 96–0 vote, and he received his commission on March 28, 2006. Since that time, his involvement with a prisoner re-entry program has received media attention. He assumed senior status on July 1, 2019.

== Sources ==
Legal offices
Preceded by David A. Katz	Judge of the United States District Court for the Northern District of Ohio; 2006–2019	Succeeded by James R. Knepp II
