= John H. Noseworthy =

American neurologist

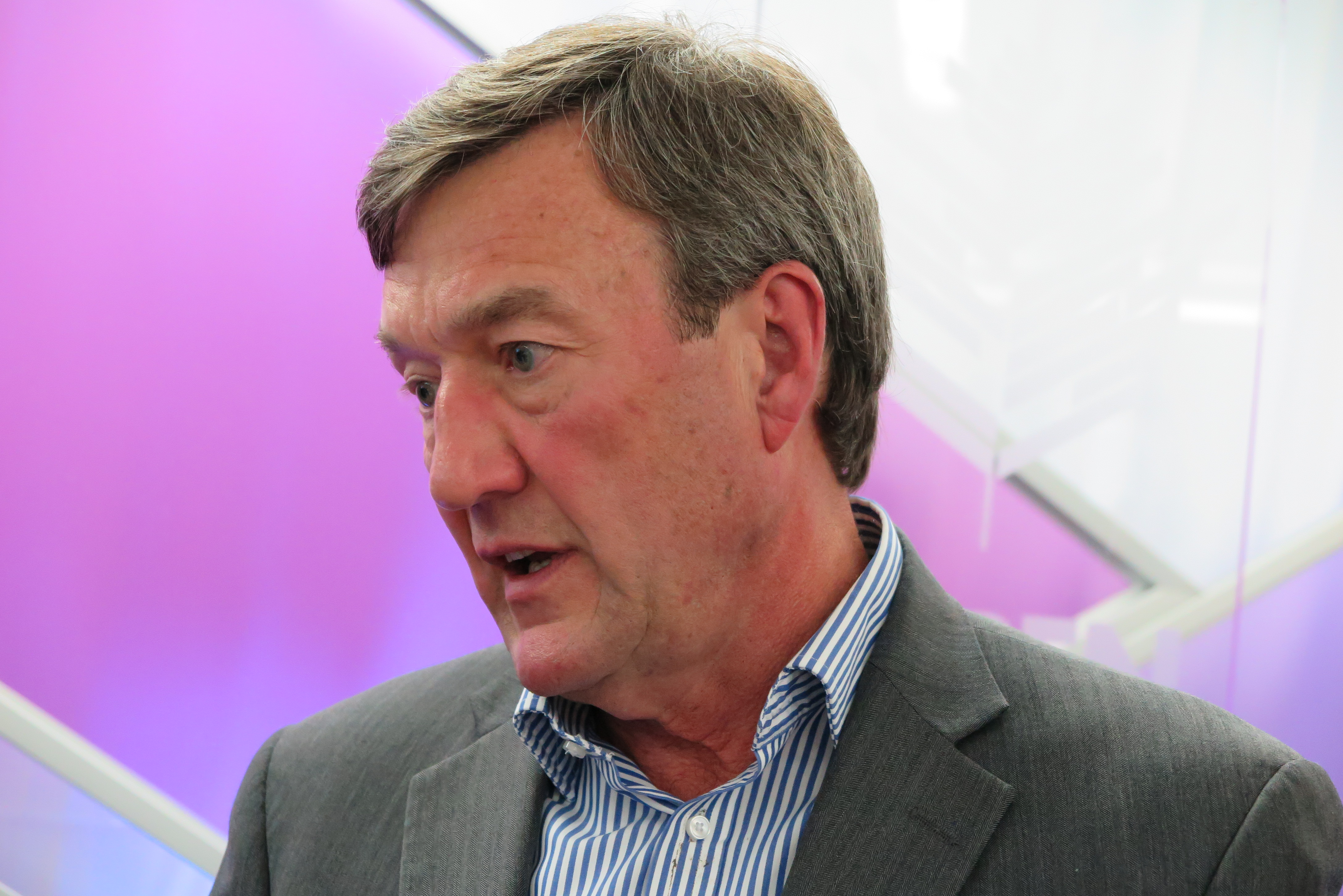
- Noseworthy in 2015
- Born: November 9, 1951 (age 74); Melrose, Massachusetts
- Education: Dalhousie University
- Occupations: President and CEO Emeritus of Mayo Clinic
- Board member of: UnitedHealth Group; Merck & Co.
- Children: 2

John Harnett Noseworthy (born 9 November 1951) is an American neurologist who served as the president and chief executive officer of Mayo Clinic from 2009 to 2018. A board-certified neurologist specializing in multiple sclerosis, Noseworthy is the former editor-in-chief of Neurology, the official journal of the American Academy of Neurology. Noseworthy advised the first administration of President Donald Trump on health care issues. He has advocated for research funding and telemedicine as a means to reduce the costs of treating patients, among other things. Under Noseworthy's leadership, Mayo Clinic and governments in Minnesota launched the Destination Medical Center (DMC) initiative to advance Minnesota as a global destination for health care and wellness. Prior to his appointment as CEO of Mayo Clinic, Noseworthy held several leadership roles within the organization.

== Early life and education ==
John Harnett Noseworthy was born in 1951 in Melrose, Massachusetts. He attended St Mark's School in Southborough, Massachusetts, graduating in 1969.

Noseworthy received his MD from Dalhousie University in Nova Scotia in 1975. He interned at the Royal Columbian Hospital in British Columbia before becoming a resident in internal medicine at Queen Elizabeth II Health Sciences Centre, a teaching hospital affiliated with Dalhousie University, in 1977. He moved to neurology in 1979 and in 1981 became a Fellow of the Royal College of Physicians and Surgeons of Canada, again in neurology. In 1983, he completed research fellowships in pathology at Harvard Medical School, and in neurology at Massachusetts General Hospital.

== Career ==
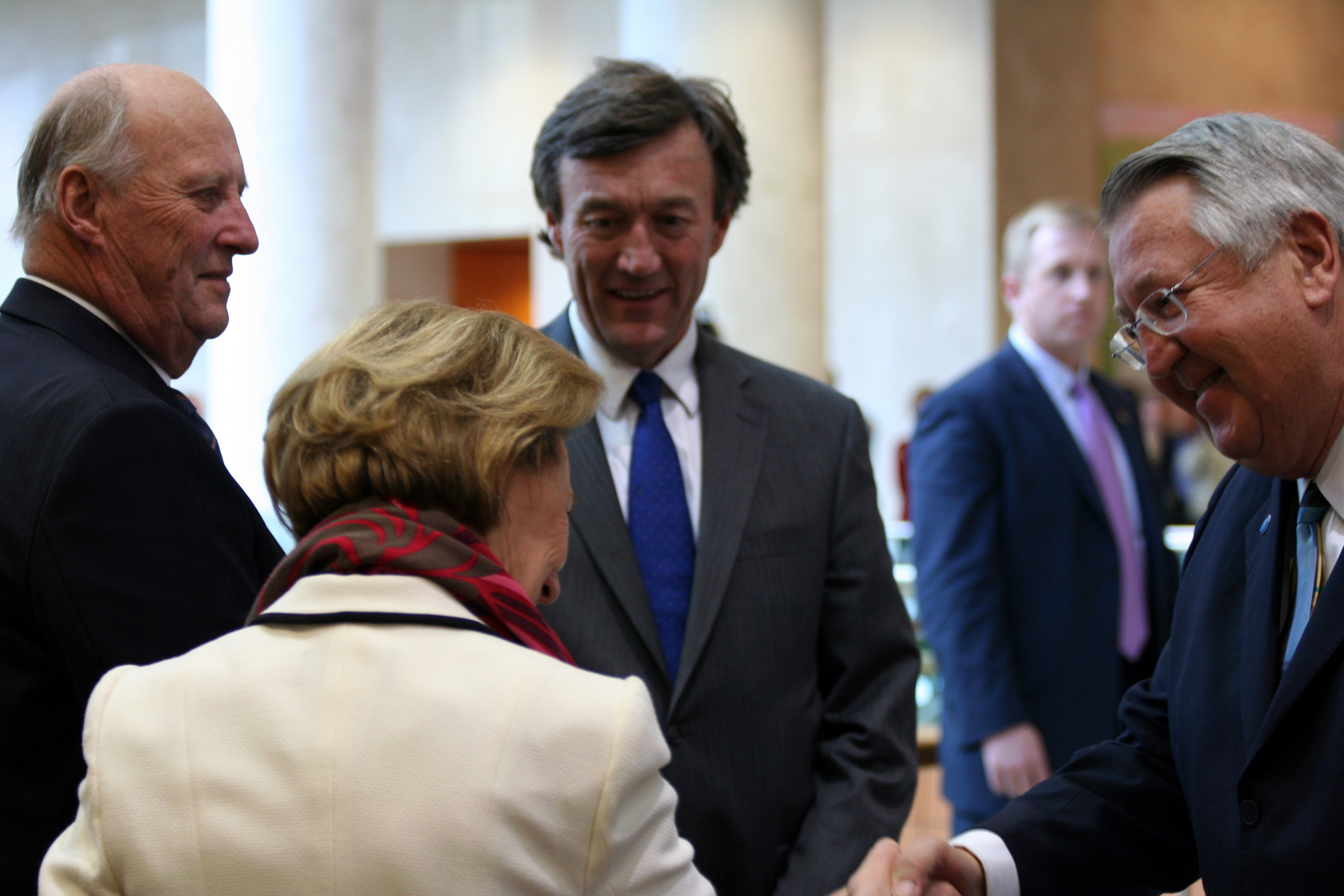
King Harald and Queen Sonja of Norway with Noseworthy, meeting Ardell Brede, Mayor of Rochester, Minnesota in 2011.

Noseworthy joined the Mayo Clinic Department of Neurology in 1990, and over the course of his scientific career contributed to more than 150 peer-reviewed publications in the areas of neurology, clinical practice, leadership, and access to medical care. Noseworthy was the editor-in-chief of the journal Neurology from 2007 to 2009. Under Noseworthy, Neurology began publishing weekly rather than monthly.

At Mayo Clinic, Noseworthy held several leadership roles, including chairman of the Department of Neurology (1997 to 2006), medical director of Mayo Clinic's Department of Development (2006 to 2009), member of the Mayo Clinic Rochester Executive Board (2006 to 2009), and vice-chairman of the Mayo Clinic Executive Board (2006 to 2009). Noseworthy was appointed CEO in 2009, succeeding Denis Cortese.

As CEO, he reorganized Mayo Clinic from a holding company into a single unit with one business plan and strategy. During Noseworthy's tenure, Mayo Clinic's revenues increased to $12 billion and the hospital ranked No. 1 on U.S. News & World Report''s "Best Hospitals" list for four of his last five years as CEO. He also oversaw Mayo Clinic's launch of its Destination Medical Center, a 20-year $5.6 billion economic development initiative. As one of his final projects at Mayo Clinic, the organization rolled out an electronic health record system. Noseworthy retired at the end of 2018, in line with Mayo Clinic's tradition of rotating its leadership every decade.

Noseworthy advised the first Trump administration on health care issues, including ways to improve the Department of Veterans Affairs, national medical research funding, and the effects of immigration policies on patient access and doctor training. Additionally, Noseworthy has advocated for telemedicine as a means to improve health care access and lower costs. He said the federal government's policies have failed to keep up with state regulatory policies on telemedicine. Noseworthy was one of 10 prominent hospital CEOs to author an article in Health Affairs about physician burnout. Noseworthy and others called for health care leaders to make addressing physician burnout a major priority due to its adverse effects on patient safety, quality of care, and health care costs.

Among his board service, Noseworthy has served on the board of directors for UnitedHealth Group, Merck & Co., and the American Academy of Neurology.

=== Recognition ===
Noseworthy's recognition includes: Alumnus of the Year, Dalhousie University (2005); honorary doctorate of science degree, University of Western Ontario (2012); honorary doctorate of laws from Dalhousie University (2015); Officer of the Order of Orange-Nassau (2015); and Research!America, Geoffrey Beene Builders of Science Award (2016).

== Personal life ==
Noseworthy married Patricia Ann Miller in 1974. They have two sons, Peter and Mark.
