= Malcolm Hoenlein =

American activist

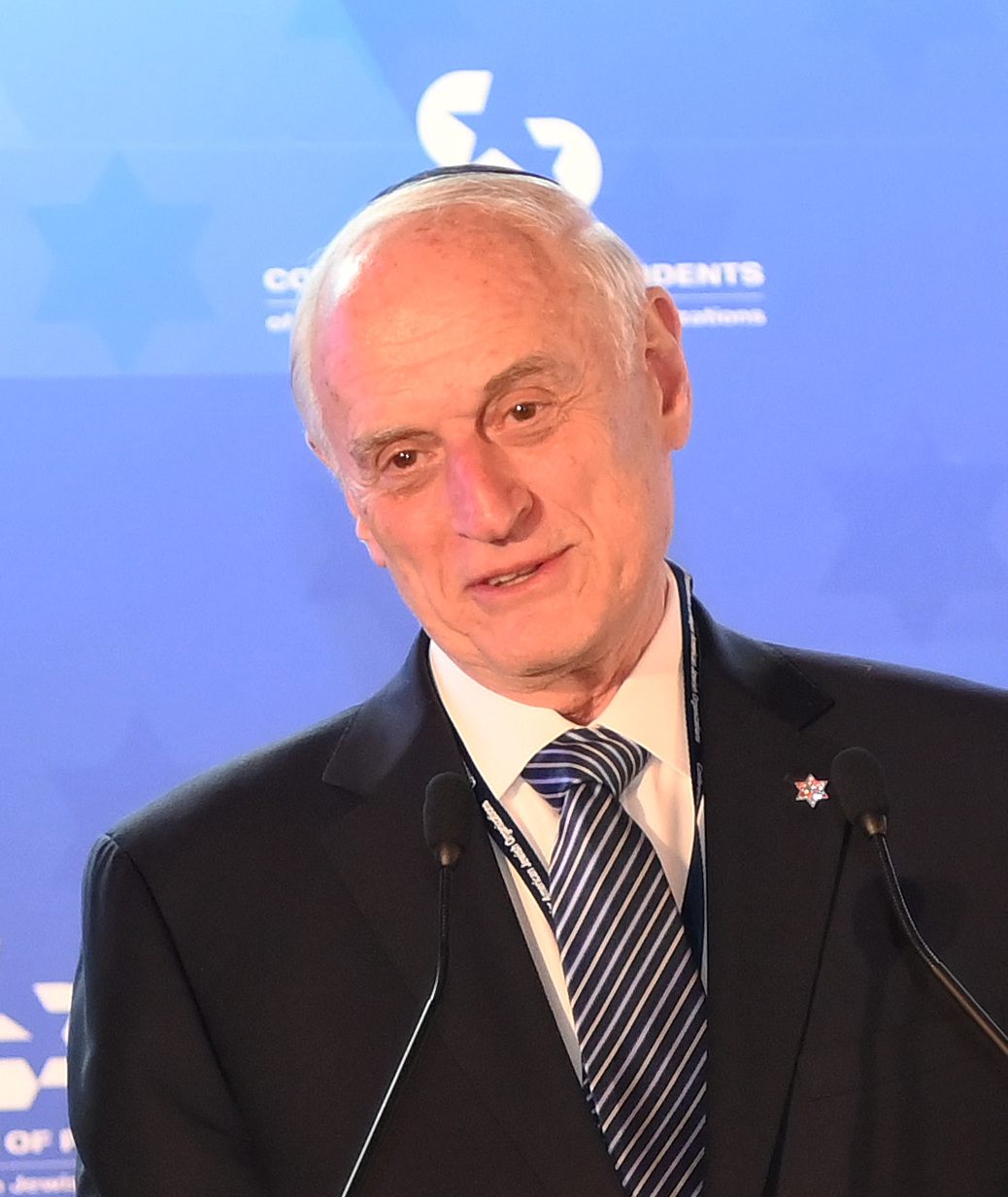
Malcolm Hoenlein, 2023

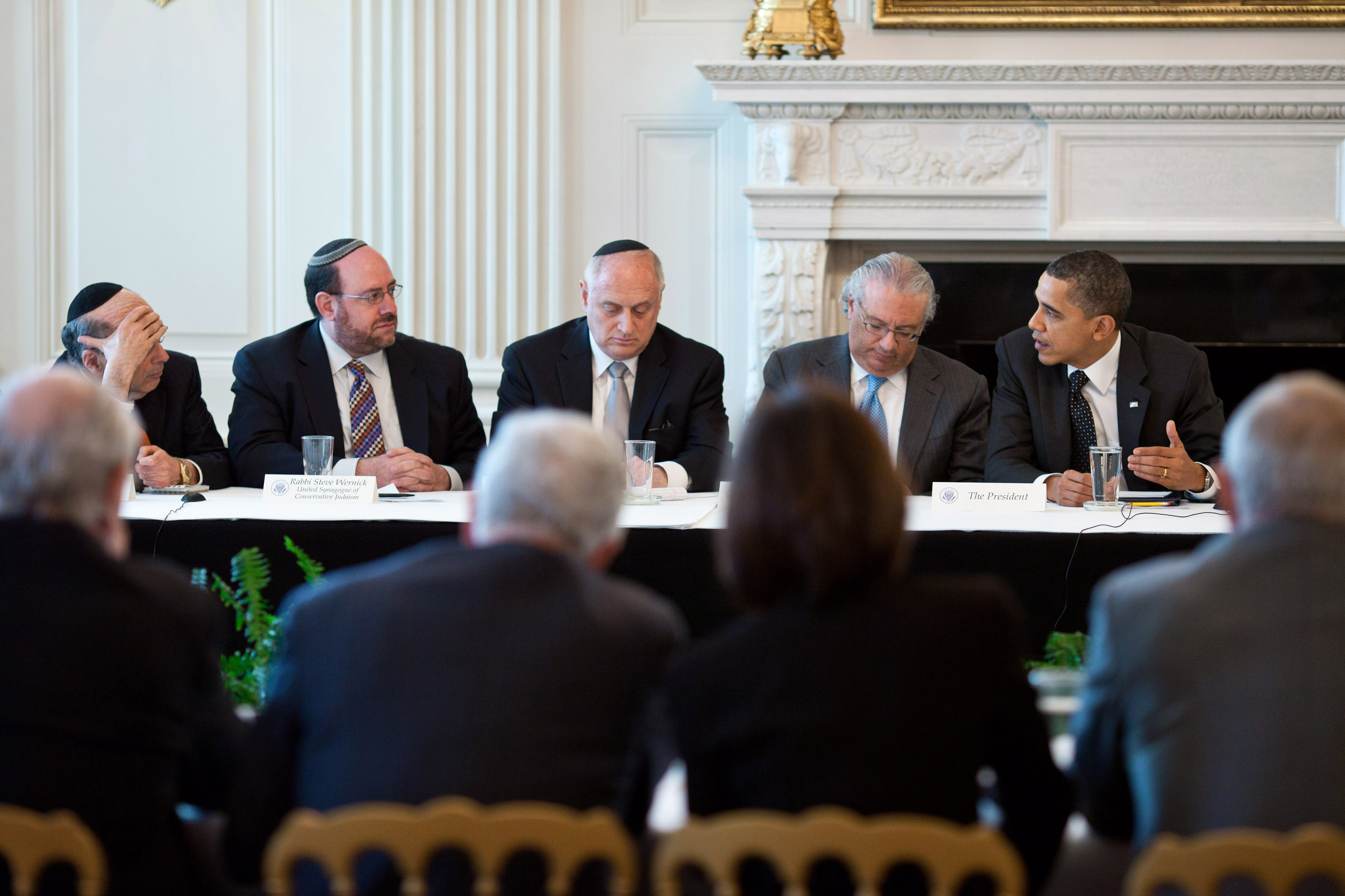
Hoenlein meets with U.S. President Barack Obama, (Hoenlein is sitting in the middle with his head lowered)

Malcolm Hoenlein is an American activist who served as the executive vice chairman of the Conference of Presidents of Major American Jewish Organizations from June 1986 until 2019. He was succeeded by William Daroff. He is the founding executive director of the Greater New York Conference on Soviet Jewry and the Jewish Community Relations Council of New York.

== Early life and career ==
Born in Philadelphia, Pennsylvania, Hoenlein received his BA from Temple University and his PhD from the University of Pennsylvania.

While he was at college, Hoenlein helped to found the North American Jewish Student Network and served as its chairman. NAJSN was the North American affiliate of the World Union of Jewish Students (WUJS).

He has taught international relations and served as a Middle East specialist at the Foreign Policy Research Institute (FPRI). In addition, he served on the editorial staff of Orbis, FPRI's journal of international affairs.

Hoenlein is the recipient of many awards and tributes from organizations and individuals, including State of Israel Bonds, President Ronald Reagan, American ORT, Brandeis University, Ruppin Academic Center Israel, Jerusalem College of Technology, and the Union of Orthodox Jewish Congregations. He played a key role in organizing the massive National Solidarity Rally for Israel in Washington, D.C., on April 15, 2002. A recent poll ranks him as the most influential American leader on Jewish community affairs.

Hoenlein is associated with and serves on the boards of many communal, educational and civic organizations including the Council on Foreign Relations, America-Israel Chamber of Commerce, the Uzbekistan-U.S. Chamber, the Ronald S. Lauder Foundation, Jerusalem's Sha'arey Tzedek Medical Center, the Fairness Project and One Family. He is chairman of America's Voices in Israel and co-chair of Sharing for Life. He serves on the Board of Directors or Advisory Board of several companies, including Bank Leumi USA. He is also the director of Keryx Biopharmaceuticals since 2001.

President George W. Bush appointed Hoenlein to serve on the honorary delegation to accompany him to Jerusalem for the celebration of the 60th anniversary of the State of Israel in May 2008.

== Political opinions ==
On Sept 18, 2008, Hoenlein announced that the coalition of groups sponsoring a rally to protest Iranian President Mahmoud Ahmadinejad had concluded they must rescind an invitation to vice presidential candidate Gov. Sarah Palin. According to an interview Hoenlein gave to NBC/NJ, the invitation was initially extended to balance Sen. Hillary Clinton, who had long been on the rally agenda.

The sequence of events became highly politicized, gaining significant media attention. According to AP, Palin blamed Democrats for withdrawing the rally invitation. Palin complained to supporters that "Democrat partisans" had pressured organizers. Sen. Richard Durbin, however, noted "it's very tense political time, the election is so close, and I think there were basic mistakes made in organizing this rally, I'm not being negative, but I think the way the invitations were issued created a problem. I'm sure they never intended this to happen, but it did."

Hoenlein stirred further controversy over a conference call during the heat of the campaign with Senator John McCain. The Jewish Daily Forward reported that the call was not well received by Jewish leaders who felt it was "inappropriate for the non-partisan group to promote one candidate"s events." One noted, "there is a general perception that the Presidents Conference leans more to the right, and this is yet another example." Hoenlein fired back in an interview with Shalom TV that The Forward was "not a paper of great import". The Jewish Telegraphic Agency noted that the animosity with The Forward is "mutual", noting that "Hoenlein didn't make the cut for the Forward 50," the paper's annual list of most influential Jewish leaders.

Hoenlein made news again with his statement that President Barack Obama's June 4, 2009, speech to the Arab world from Cairo dismayed many Jews with its attempt to compare the struggle of the Palestinians with Israel to the World War II Jewish Holocaust. Hoenlein is an advocate of Jewish humanitarian efforts worldwide, and met Bashar al-Assad just before the Syrian Uprising.
