= David A. Katz =

American judge

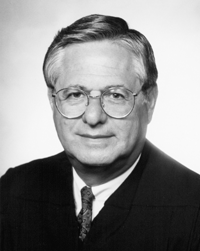

Senior Judge of the United States District Court for the Northern District of Ohio
- In office January 1, 2005 – July 26, 2016

Judge of the United States District Court for the Northern District of Ohio
- In office October 11, 1994 – January 1, 2005
- Appointed by: Bill Clinton
- Preceded by: Alvin Krenzler
- Succeeded by: Jack Zouhary

Personal details
- Born: November 1, 1933 Toledo, Ohio, U.S.
- Died: July 26, 2016 (aged 82) Sylvania, Ohio, U.S.
- Education: Ohio State University (BS); Ohio State University College of Law (JD)

David Allan Katz (November 1, 1933 – July 26, 2016) was a United States district judge of the United States District Court for the Northern District of Ohio.

== Education and career ==
Born in Toledo, Ohio in 1933, Katz received a Bachelor of Science degree from Ohio State University in 1955, and a Juris Doctor from Ohio State University College of Law in 1957. He was in private practice in Toledo from 1957 to 1994, focusing on corporate law.

== Federal judicial service ==
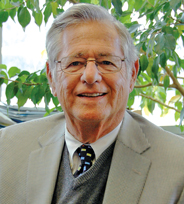
Katz in 2011.

On August 12, 1994, Katz was nominated by President Bill Clinton to a seat on the United States District Court for the Northern District of Ohio vacated by Alvin Krenzler. A substantial majority of the American Bar Association Standing Committee on the Federal Judiciary deemed Katz not qualified, citing a near-total absence of trial experience.

Katz was confirmed by the United States Senate on October 7, 1994, and received his commission on October 11, 1994. He assumed senior status on January 1, 2005. Katz died on July 26, 2016.

== See also ==
- List of Jewish American jurists

== Sources ==
Legal offices
| Preceded by Alvin Krenzler | Judge of the United States District Court for the Northern District of Ohio; 1994–2005 | Succeeded by Jack Zouhary |
