= Neurology (journal) =

American scientific journal on neurology

- Discipline: Neurology
- Language: English
- Edited by: José G. Merino, MD, MPhil, FAAN (neurologist)

Publication details
- History: 1951–present
- Publisher: Wolters Kluwer on behalf of the American Academy of Neurology (United States)
- Frequency: Weekly, 48 issues/year
- Impact factor: 9.901 (2020)

Standard abbreviations
- ISO 4: Neurology

Indexing
- CODEN: NEURAI
- ISSN: 0028-3878 (print); 1526-632X (web)
- LCCN: 55043902
- OCLC no.: 960771045

Links
- Journal homepage; Online access; Online archive

Neurology is a weekly peer-reviewed medical journal covering research in neurology. It is published by Wolters Kluwer on behalf of the American Academy of Neurology, of which it is the official journal. It has been edited since April 2020 by José G. Merino (Georgetown University).

== Previous editors-in-chief ==
The following persons have been editors-in-chief:

- Russell N. DeJong (1951–1977; University of Michigan Medical School), founding editor-in-chief
- Lewis P. Rowland (1977–1987; Columbia University)
- Robert B. Daroff (1987–1997; Case Western Reserve University School of Medicine)
- Robert C. Griggs (1997–2007; University of Rochester Medical Center)
- John H. Noseworthy (2007–2009; Mayo Clinic)
- Robert A. Gross (2009–2020; University of Rochester Medical Center)

== Abstracting and indexing ==
The journal is abstracted and indexed in:

- Biological Abstracts
- BIOSIS Previews
- CAB Abstracts
- CINAHL
- Current Contents/Clinical Medicine
- Current Contents/Life Sciences
- Embase
- Index Medicus/MEDLINE/PubMed
- PASCAL
- PsycINFO
- Science Citation Index
- Scopus

According to the Journal Citation Reports by Clarivate, the journal has a 2022 impact factor of 11.8.
