= Don John Young =

American judge

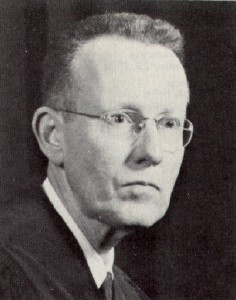

Senior Judge of the United States District Court for the Northern District of Ohio
- In office July 1, 1980 – May 10, 1996

Judge of the United States District Court for the Northern District of Ohio
- In office May 22, 1965 – July 1, 1980
- Appointed by: Lyndon B. Johnson
- Preceded by: Frank Le Blond Kloeb
- Succeeded by: Alvin Krenzler

Personal details
- Born: Don John Young; July 13, 1910 Norwalk, Ohio, U.S.
- Died: May 10, 1996 (aged 85) Sandusky, Ohio, U.S.
- Education: Case Western Reserve University (A.B.); Case Western Reserve University School of Law (LL.B.)

Don John Young (July 13, 1910 – May 10, 1996) was a United States district judge of the United States District Court for the Northern District of Ohio.

== Education and career ==
Born in Norwalk, Ohio, Young received an Artium Baccalaureus degree from Case Western Reserve University in 1932 and a Bachelor of Laws from Case Western Reserve University School of Law in 1934. He was in private practice in Norwalk from 1934 to 1952. He was a judge of the Huron County Court of Common Pleas from 1952 to 1953, and of the Probate and Juvenile Court in Huron County from 1953 to 1965.

== Federal judicial service ==
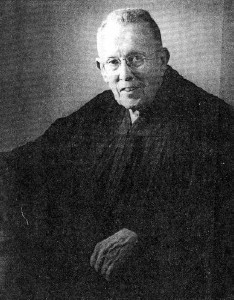
Judicial portrait of Young, 1980.

On April 5, 1965, Young was nominated by President Lyndon B. Johnson to a seat on the United States District Court for the Northern District of Ohio vacated by Judge Frank Le Blond Kloeb. Young was confirmed by the United States Senate on May 21, 1965, and received his commission on May 22, 1965. He assumed senior status on July 1, 1980, serving in that capacity until his death on May 10, 1996, in Sandusky, Ohio.

Legal offices
Preceded by Frank Le Blond Kloeb	Judge of the United States District Court for the Northern District of Ohio; 1965–1980	Succeeded by Alvin Krenzler
