= Charles Moreland =

American politician

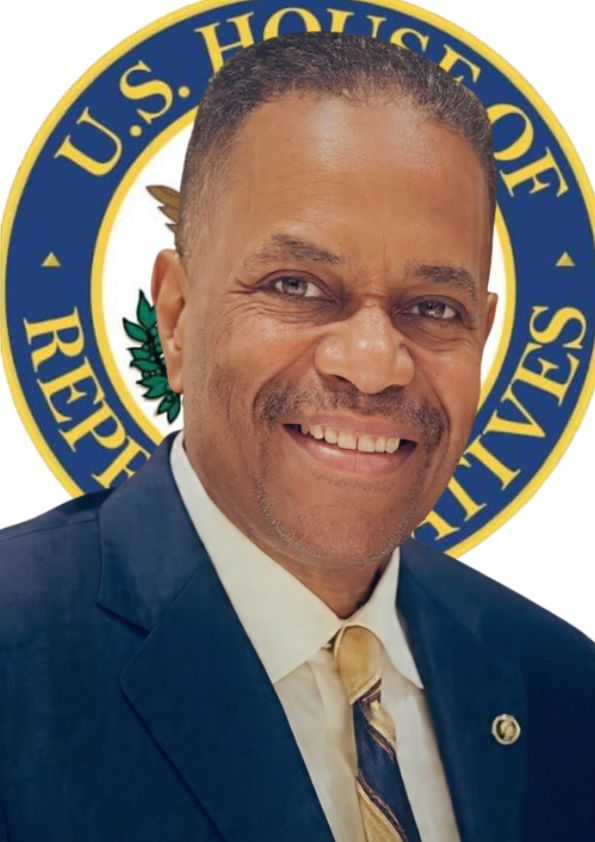

Shadow Member of the U.S. House of Representatives from the District of Columbia at-large district
- In office January 3, 1991 – January 3, 1995
- Preceded by: Constituency established
- Succeeded by: John Capozzi

Personal details
- Born: July 5, 1948 (age 77)
- Party: Democratic
- Education: Antioch University (BS, JD)

Charles J. Moreland (born July 5, 1948) is an American politician. He served as a shadow member for the District of Columbia at-large district of the United States House of Representatives.

== Life and career ==
Moreland attended Antioch University and Antioch School of Law.

Moreland was a lawyer and political consultant. In 1990, Moreland defeated Howard Lamar Jones and Tom Chorlton in the general election for the District of Columbia at-large district of the United States House of Representatives, winning 73 percent of the votes.

U.S. House of Representatives
New constituency	Shadow Member of the U.S. House of Representatives from the District of Columbia's at-large congressional district 1991–1995	Succeeded by John Capozzi
