= Anthony P. Capozzi =

American lawyer (born 1945)

- Born: Anthony Patrick Capozzi; June 28, 1945 (age 81)
- Education: SUNY Buffalo; University of Toledo College of Law
- Occupation: attorney

Anthony Patrick "Tony" Capozzi (born June 28, 1945) is an American trial attorney and political consultant and participant. During his legal career, he has worked as a solo practitioner, supervising Assistant United States Attorney, adjunct professor of law, and law clerk to Omer Poos of the United States District Court in Springfield, Illinois. He also served as the 79th President to the State Bar of California. He owns and practices law at the Law Offices of Anthony P. Capozzi and serves on the California Commission on Judicial Performance, a post California Governor Arnold Schwarzenegger appointed him to in 2010. Since 2005, Capozzi has been the exclusive legal and political consultant for KFSN-TV ABC 30.

== Early life ==
Capozzi was born the fourth of five boys to Lily Violanti (1912–2008) and Joseph Capozzi (1902–1987). His father, Joseph Capozzi, was an Italian immigrant who settled in Buffalo, New York. Capozzi's childhood house still stands. The family grew their own produce in the family garden and raised chickens in a pen behind the house.

Anthony Capozzi grew up playing football with his brothers in the field next to the house. Eventually, Capozzi would earn all conference honors playing as a split end in high school. He was referred to as ‘Mr. Touchdown.’ He received several scholarship offers for football but turned them down. Capozzi has four brothers: Frank Capozzi (1935–2002), John Capozzi (1938–2008), Joseph Capozzi (1940 - ), and Patrick Capozzi (1948 - ).

== Education ==
=== Bachelor of Arts ===
Capozzi was first in his family to attend college. He earned his Bachelor of Arts Degree in Philosophy from the State University of New York at Buffalo in 1967. He worked as a grocery store clerk and cashier during the summer to pay for tuition. He also worked, during college, at the Buffalo steel mill with his father and brothers. During college, he was elected President of the Phi Kappa Psi fraternity.

=== Juris Doctor ===
Capozzi became interested in the law while growing up in Buffalo. His inspiration came from his uncle, Frank Violanti, who was a very successful United States Attorney with the Department of Justice. Frank Violanti became his legal mentor and icon. Capozzi graduated in 1970 with a Juris Doctor degree from the University of Toledo College of Law in Ohio.

=== Honorary Doctorate of Laws ===
In 2010, Capozzi was awarded an Honorary Degree of Doctorate of Laws from the Southern California Institute of Law for his exceptional contributions to society. Former honorees of the Institute include Court of Appeals judge and former Solicitor General Kenneth Starr, California Supreme Court Justice Ming Chin, California State Attorney General Bill Lockyer, and former Governing President of the United Nations International Criminal Court Prince Zeid Al-Hussein.

== Legal career ==
In 1970, Capozzi clerked for Judge Omer Poos of the United States District Court, Southern District of Illinois. Living in Springfield, Illinois, Capozzi became an ardent admirer of Abraham Lincoln. Lincoln has remained a personal and professional icon to Capozzi. Though originally he was only hired to serve a one-year term, Judge Poos, impressed, kept Capozzi as his law clerk for three years.

In 1973, Capozzi moved to Fresno, California to begin work as the Supervising Assistant United States Attorney for the Eastern District of California. During this post, which lasted until 1978, Capozzi handled all phases of the federal government's civil and criminal matters in the United States District Court for the Eastern District of California and the United States Court of Appeals for the Ninth Circuit. During his tenure as an Assistant United States Attorney, Capozzi also served as an instructor for the Department of Justice Advocacy Institute in Washington, D.C. As instructor, he was responsible for training new Assistant United States Attorneys throughout the country.

During 1974-1978, Capozzi was an adjunct professor at the San Joaquin College of Law in Clovis, California. He was responsible for conducting the school's criminal law clinics. In 1979, and to this day, Capozzi has owned and operated the Law Offices of Anthony P. Capozzi in Fresno, California. As a solo practitioner, Capozzi specializes in white collar criminal cases and civil litigation. Capozzi has earned an AV Preeeminent (highest) rating from Martindale-Hubbell. Capozzi joined the State Bar of California in 1976. He was also admitted to practice law in Illinois and Ohio.

=== Notable cases ===
==== United States v. Taung Ming Lin, Wang Lin Farms, Inc. ====
This case was prosecuted under the Endangered Species Act. Approximately twenty-two agents of the Fish and Wildlife Service raided the farm of Taiwanese immigrant, Taung Ming Lin, and “arrested” his tractor and disc. The government then charged Mr. Lin and his corporation with three counts of violating the Endangered Species Act. The potential penalty was three years in jail and a $300,000 fine for Mr. Lin. In addition, the government sought (1) to have Mr. Lin deed over 363 acres of his 720 acres of land to the government and (2) pay the government approximately $172,000 to maintain Mr. Lin's land as a habitat for the endangered species. The national media and the agricultural community took an avid interest in this case, which was eventually dismissed.

==== United States v. Hanoum ====
On appeal it was argued that the case of U.S. v. Lara-Hernandez, was distinguishable from the Hanoum case since in Lara, the motion for new trial had been based upon facts known to the accused at the time of the trial. However, in Hanoum, the facts upon which the motion for new trial was based had not been known to the defendant in the seven-day period after trial. The Court of Appeals added a new aspect to the standard and held that a motion for new trial based upon “newly discovered evidence” is limited only to where the newly discovered evidence relates to the elements of the crime charged. The Hanoum case is significant in that it established a new interpretation of the law with regard to a motion for new trial based upon newly discovered evidence. The Supreme Court denied the Writ of Certiorari in this case.

==== United States v. Brian Setencich ====
This jury trial involved political corruption and the signing of false tax returns. The defendant was the former Speaker of the California Assembly and a Fresno City Councilman, Brian Setencich. The trial lasted approximately two weeks with a verdict of not guilty on the political corruption counts and a hung jury on the tax charges. On re-trial of the tax charges, before Judge Oliver W. Wanger, the jury convicted Mr. Setencich on one count of tax evasion. Mr. Setencich was sentenced to six months in a halfway house.

==== United States v. Hagop Vartanian ====
This jury trial was related to a point-shaving investigation regarding the Fresno State Basketball team coached by Jerry Tarkanian. Mr. Vartanian was convicted of all counts after a two-week jury trial. The sentencing involved numerous evidentiary hearings on complicated legal issues. Mr. Vartanian was sentenced to 15 months in the custody of the Bureau of Prisons.

==== United States v. Luke Anthony Scarmazzo ====
This jury trial was a case of first impression where Mr. Capozzi represented Mr. Scarmazzo as the owner of a marijuana dispensary which was permissible under California law, but a violation of Federal law. The unusual aspect of this case was that Mr. Scarmazzo was charged with a Continuing Criminal Enterprise which had a mandatory minimum sentence of 20 years. Mr. Scarmazzo was found not guilty on a number of counts, but found guilty of the Continuing Criminal Enterprise and related counts. He was sentenced to 21 years. Prior to the trial of this case, the CBS news program, 60 Minutes, with Morley Safer, did a segment on this case and conducted interviews with both Mr.Scarmazzo and Mr. Capozzi.

==== United States v. Diana Lee Flaherty ====
The Petition for Writ of Certiorari was filed requesting the Supreme Court of the United States to review whether state of mind evidence pursuant to Federal rule of Evidence 803(3) violates the foundational principles of our system of justice grounded in the Fifth and Sixth Amendments to the Constitution that a defendant has a right to present a defense to the charged offenses and has the right to present evidence and testimony favorable to the defense. The Petition was denied on October 14, 2008.

== Affiliations ==
Capozzi has been affiliated with numerous community and professional organizations. He has served on the board and as president to many local, regional, and statewide organizations from 1977 to the present day.

In 1999, Capozzi was elected President of the Fresno County Bar Association. Also in 1999, he was elected President of the San Joaquin Valley Chapter of the Federal Bar Association. Capozzi first held office with the State Bar of California in 2000 when he served four years on the Bar's Board of Governors. In 2002, he was elected as Vice President and Treasurer of the Bar. In 2003, Capozzi was elected the 79th President of the State Bar. During his term, Capozzi promoted prop bono work and increased legal services for the indigent. He served until 2004.

In 2005, Capozzi began a two-year term as Co-Chair of the California Bench Bar Coalition. The Coalition was formed to enhance communication and coordinate the activities of the judicial community with the state, local, and specialty bars on issues of common interest—particularly in the legislative arena. In 2006, Capozzi became a fellow in the American Board of Criminal Lawyers (ABCL). ABCL is an exclusive national, legal, honorary society for outstanding criminal trial lawyers, with admission to fellowship by invitation only. Capozzi began a five-year term as a member of the Judicial Council of California for the Administrative Office of the Courts. The Council is the policy making body of the California courts.

Since 2009, Capozzi has served as Chair of the State Bar of California's Law School Advisory Committee on California Accredited Law Schools (ACCALS). The committee is responsible for recommending changes to the standards that govern state bar accreditation. In 2010, Governor of California Arnold Schwarzenegger appointed Capozzi to the Commission on Judicial Performance. The Commission is the independent state agency responsible for investigating complaints of judicial misconduct and judicial incapacity, and for disciplining judges. The Committee consists of one Court of Appeal justice, two Superior Court judges, two attorneys, and six lay citizens. Capozzi's term is set to expire in 2013.

== Media ==
Capozzi has been the exclusive legal and political consultant for KFSN-TV ABC 30 since 2005. Often chastised for being a lawyer, Capozzi has remained an ardent supporter of his profession. Believing in the long historical contribution of America's lawyers, Capozzi, quoted in the book The Lawyer Myth A Defense of the American Legal Profession:

Despite all of the lawyer negativity, the truth is that in our hours of national crisis, our society has embraced the lawyers and has looked to lawyers for guidance and leadership. An appellate lawyer from Virginia wrote the Declaration of Independence. A trial lawyer, yes trial lawyer, from Illinois, issued the Emancipation Proclamation. A corporate lawyer from New York led us through the dark hours of the Great Depression and then a world war. And most recently, a trial lawyer, as mayor, led the people of New York through the tragic aftermath of 9/11.

== Politics ==
Capozzi has been involved in politics since his move to California in 1973. He campaigned extensively for President Jimmy Carter and Democratic nominee Walter Mondale. He was a delegate for President Jimmy Carter at the Democratic National Convention. In 1978, Capozzi made an unsuccessful run for District Attorney in Fresno, California. In 1980, Capozzi was on the National Democratic Finance Committee. Under President Carter, Capozzi applied for appointment as United States Attorney. Although a finalist, he was eventually unsuccessful at securing the appointment.

Capozzi was a strong supporter and campaigner for Governor of California Jerry Brown during his term first two terms. Brown appointed Capozzi to the Regional Water Quality Control Board where he served from 1982 - 1985. Capozzi also supported Tom Bradley during his run for California Governor in 1982 and George Deukmejian’s re-election campaign in 1986. Capozzi served as a delegate to the 1984 Democratic National Convention in 1984. In 1984, Capozzi served on the Democratic National Committee traveling throughout the Western United States for the Mondale-Ferraro campaign.

In 1989, Capozzi made a run for mayor of Fresno, California, losing to then City Council member Karen Humphrey. Humphrey ran a campaign advertisement showing a Police officer telling voters that “we all make choices in life,” and that Capozzi had chosen to become a criminal defense lawyer. The advertisement damaged his chances of winning the election.

== Personal life ==
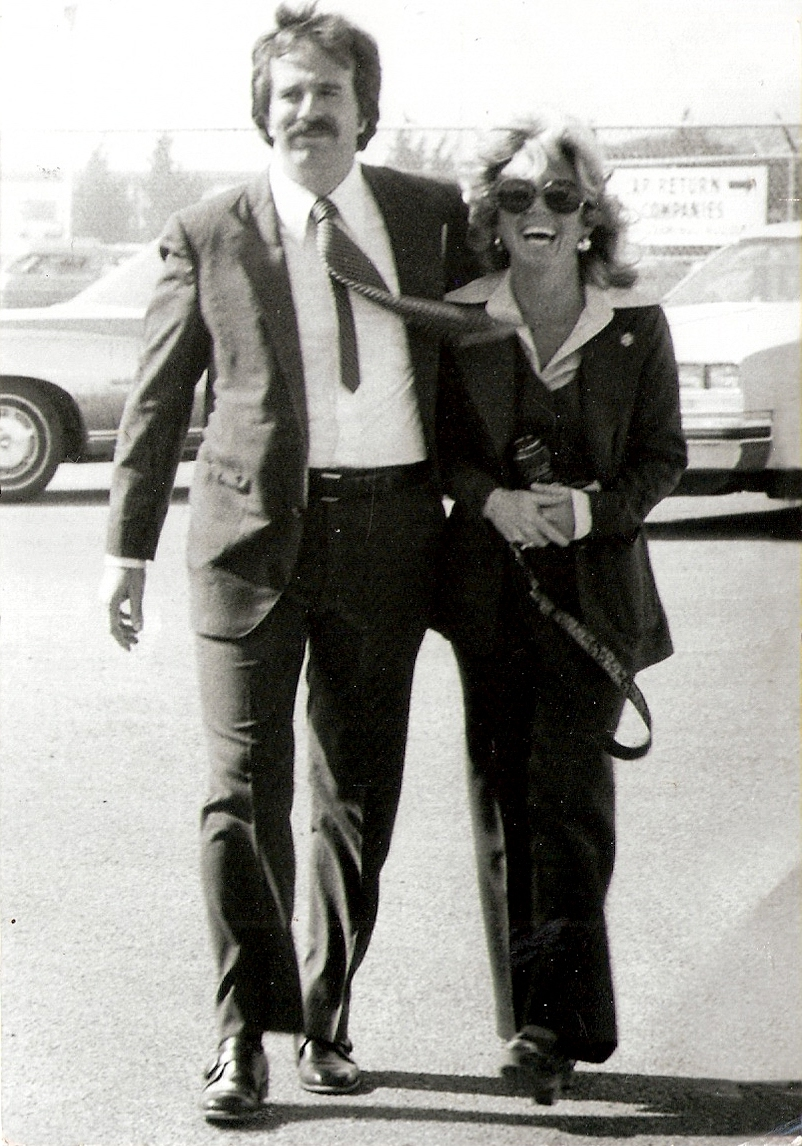
Paula and Tony Capozzi

In 1976, Capozzi married Paula Condon. They have two children.

Capozzi resides in Fresno, California, and owns a home in Carmel-by-the-Sea, California.
