= Alvin Krenzler =

American judge

Alvin Irving Krenzler
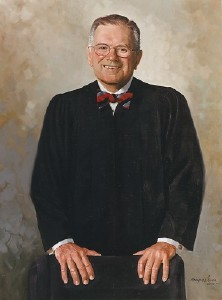
- Judicial portrait of Krenzler, 2000, by Simmie Knox.

Senior Judge of the United States District Court for the Northern District of Ohio
- In office January 1, 1992 – July 6, 1992

Judge of the United States District Court for the Northern District of Ohio
- In office December 10, 1981 – January 1, 1992
- Appointed by: Ronald Reagan
- Preceded by: Don John Young
- Succeeded by: David A. Katz

Personal details
- Born: Alvin Irving Krenzler; April 8, 1921 Chicago, Illinois, U.S.
- Died: September 15, 2010 (aged 89) Naples, Florida, U.S.
- Education: Case Western Reserve University (A.B.); Case Western Reserve University School of Law (LL.B.); Georgetown University Law Center (LL.M.)

Alvin Irving "Buddy" Krenzler (April 8, 1921 – September 15, 2010) was a United States district judge of the United States District Court for the Northern District of Ohio.

== Education and career ==
Born on April 8, 1921, in Chicago, Illinois, Krenzler received an Artium Baccalaureus degree from Case Western Reserve University in 1946. He received a Bachelor of Laws from Case Western Reserve University School of Law in 1948. He received a Master of Laws from Georgetown University Law Center in 1963. He was in the United States Navy from 1942 to 1945. He was in private practice of law in Cleveland, Ohio, from 1948 to 1960 and again from 1963 to 1968. He was an assistant state attorney general of Ohio from 1950 to 1957. He was counsel and director of the Ohio Narcotics Investigation from 1953 to 1954. He was a deputy registrar of the Ohio Department of Motor Vehicles from 1957 to 1959. He was a trial attorney of the United States Internal Revenue Service in Washington, D.C., from 1960 to 1963. He was a judge of the Court of Common Pleas in Cuyahoga County, Ohio, from 1968 to 1970. He was a judge of the Eighth District Court of Appeals of Ohio from 1970 to 1981.

== Federal judicial service ==
Krenzler was nominated by President Ronald Reagan on November 17, 1981, to a seat on the United States District Court for the Northern District of Ohio vacated by Judge Don John Young. He was confirmed by the United States Senate on December 9, 1981, and received commission on December 10, 1981. He assumed senior status on January 1, 1992. His service was terminated on July 6, 1992, due to retirement.

== Later life and death ==
Following his retirement from the bench, Krenzler became a millionaire in real estate and development. He spent most of his time in Florida where he rode his Harley Davidson motorcycle and engaged in boating and other outdoor activities. Krenzler died on September 15, 2010, at his home in Naples, Florida.

== Sources ==
- Death Notice

Legal offices
Preceded by Don John Young	Judge of the United States District Court for the Northern District of Ohio; 1981–1992	Succeeded by David A. Katz
