= William Daroff =

American Jewish Leader

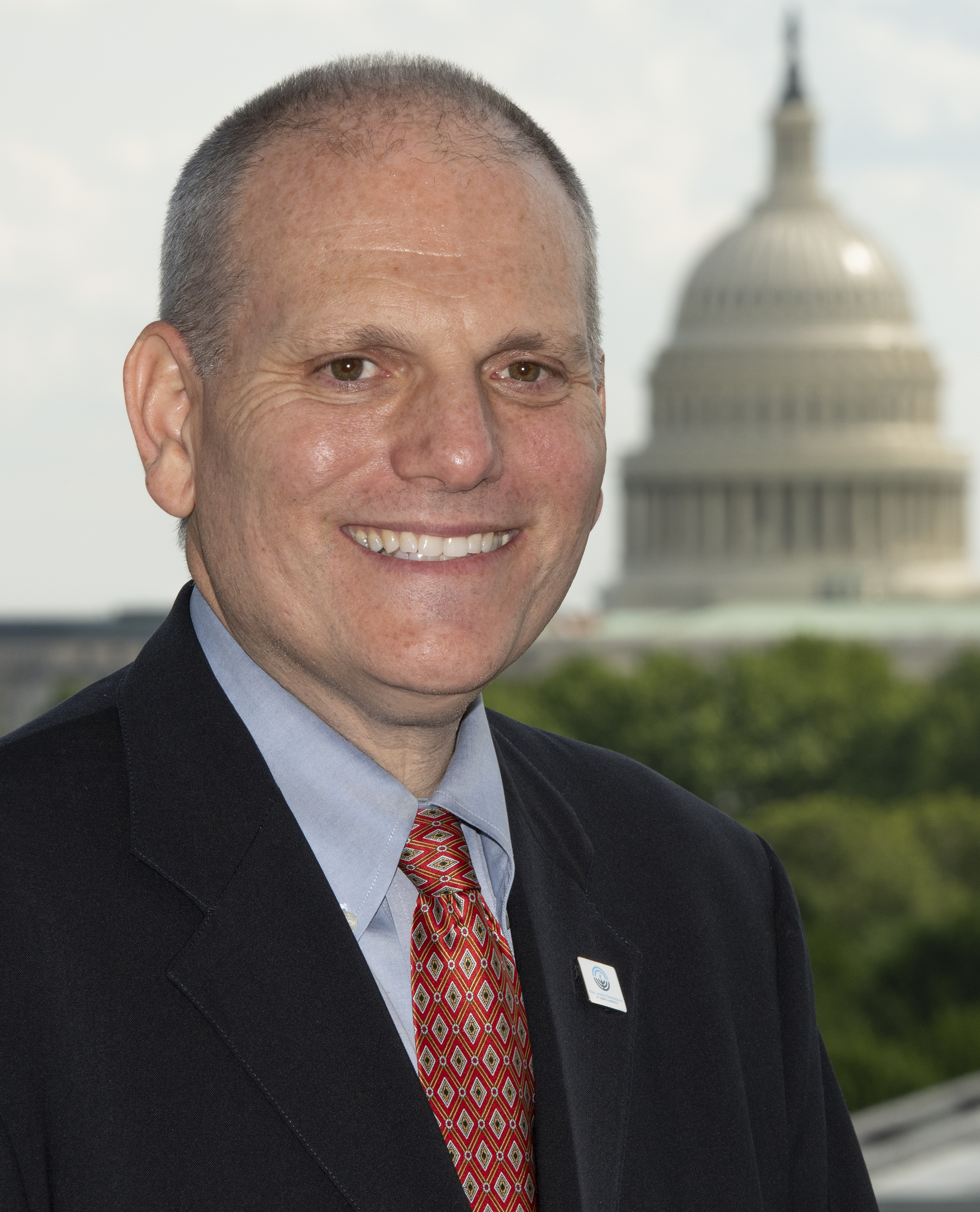
- Born: 1968 (age 57–58); Miami Beach, Florida, US
- Occupations: Chief Executive Officer, Conference of Presidents of Major American Jewish Organizations
- Known for: American Jewish Communal Leader

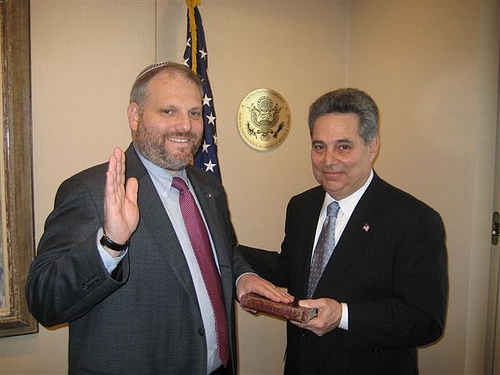
Swearing in of William Daroff to US Commission for the Preservation of America's Heritage Abroad by Chairman Warren Miller

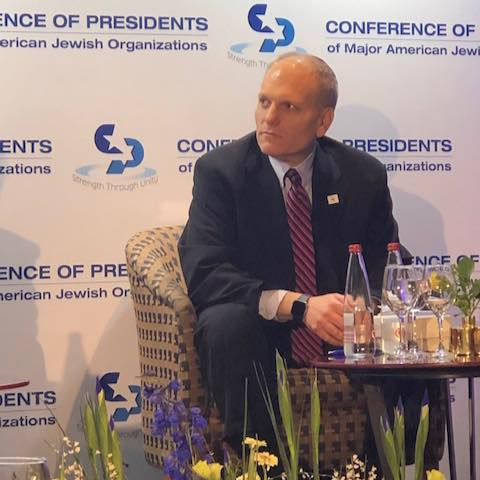
Daroff in Jerusalem, February 2019

William C. Daroff (born 1968) is the CEO of the Conference of Presidents of Major American Jewish Organizations. Previously he was the Senior Vice President for Public Policy and Director of the Washington Office of The Jewish Federations of North America.

== Early life and education ==
Daroff was born in Miami Beach, Florida, where his father, neuro-ophthalmology pioneer Robert B. Daroff, M.D., was a professor at the University of Miami. He moved with his family to suburban Cleveland, Ohio in 1980, when his father became the chairman of the Department of Neurology at Case Western Reserve University.

Daroff graduated from Hawken School in suburban Gates Mills, Ohio in 1986. He received his bachelor's degree (summa cum laude) in political science and history, his master's degree in political science, and his Juris Doctor from Case Western Reserve University in Cleveland, Ohio. He also studied at Kraków, Poland's Jagiellonian University, where he received a certificate in the history of Eastern European Jewry and The Holocaust.

== Career ==
=== Presidential Campaigns ===
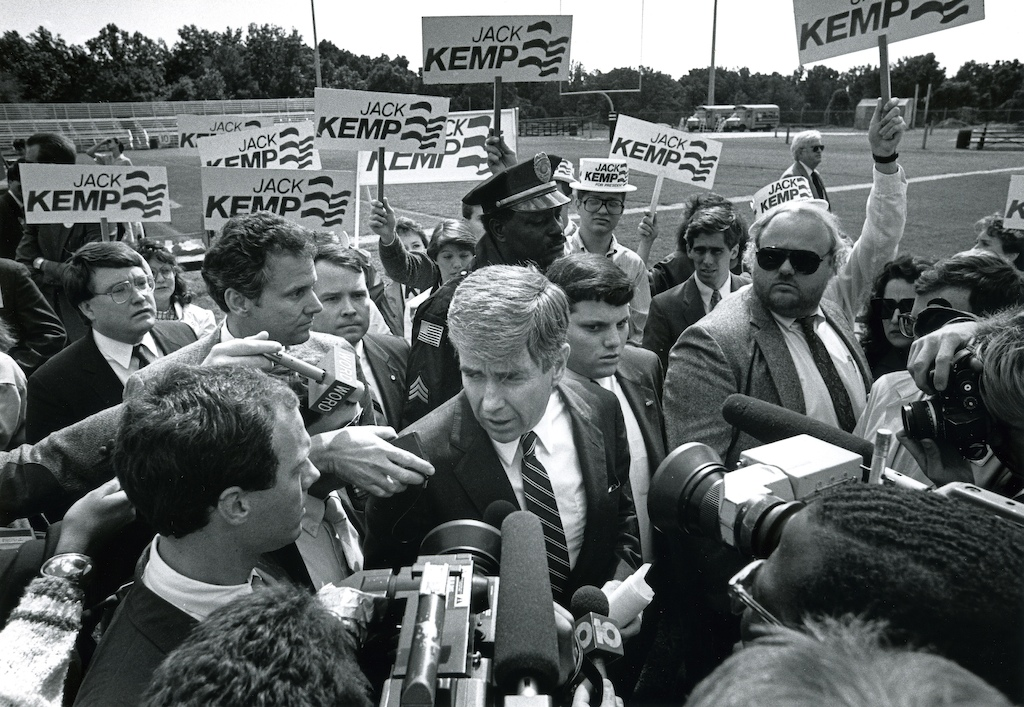
Jack Kemp at a rally in Union, South Carolina, during his 1988 Republican presidential campaign on October 3, 1987. William Daroff is standing directly behind Kemp's left shoulder.

Daroff was interested in politics at an early age and his political involvement began when he was just seven years old. He worked on three presidential campaign staffs: Rep. Jack Kemp in 1986–88 where he was lead advanceman. This was followed by working on the campaigns of then-Vice President George H. W. Bush in 1988, and Sen. Bob Dole in 1996. He also managed campaigns for the United States House of Representatives and for the State Treasurer of Ohio. At just 20 years of age, he served as Special Assistant at the U.S. Department of Energy from January 1989 to June 1990 in the Administration of President George H. W. Bush, as Special Assistant to Ohio Governor George Voinovich, and as Deputy Director of the Ohio Department of Liquor Control.

=== Cleveland Jewish Community ===
In Cleveland, Ohio, he served on the executive committee of the American Jewish Committee, on the board of Bellefaire Jewish Children's Bureau, on the leadership cabinet for Israel Bonds, and on the board of Ohio Jewish Communities. He was also involved in the Jewish Community Federation of Greater Cleveland, serving on the board of its Young Leadership Division, the community relations committee, the advocacy task force, the Young Adult Initiative board, and the public education initiative.

=== Republican Jewish Coalition ===
Upon moving to Washington, D.C., in 2000, Daroff served as director of congressional affairs (2000–2001) and then deputy executive director (2001–2005) of the Republican Jewish Coalition.

=== JFNA ===
In October 2005, Daroff became the vice president for public policy and director of the Washington Office of The Jewish Federations of North America (JFNA) formerly known as United Jewish Communities, where he advocated for the American Jewish community's agenda with the United States government. As the chief lobbyist and principal spokesperson on public policy and international affairs for the 156 Jewish federations and 300 independent communities represented by JFNA, Daroff promoted the interests of Jewish federations on Capitol Hill and in the executive branch of the United States. He became Senior Vice President for Public Policy and Director of the Washington Office in 2013.

Daroff’s portfolio included addressing Jewish poverty, providing services for Holocaust survivors, and overseeing nonprofit security. He also led disaster response campaigns to send aid to humanitarian crises such as the Nepal Earthquake and Ukraine war. Daroff has testified before committees in both the United States House of Representatives and the United States Senate. as well as the Knesset and the European Parliament.

Daroff founded the Israel Action Network, the joint JFNA-JCPA initiative created to counter efforts to delegitimize Israel.

=== Conference of Presidents of Major American Jewish Organizations ===
In August 2019, it was announced that Daroff would succeed Malcolm Hoenlein as CEO of the Conference of Presidents of Major American Jewish Organizations. He assumed the position in February 2020. In that role, he engages with the White House, Congress, foreign governments, and diplomats in Washington and at the United Nations on issues including Israel, antisemitism, and Jewish communal security. Under Daroff’s leadership, the Conference has advocated for broader adoption of the International Holocaust Remembrance Alliance working definition of antisemitism. He also supported legislation elevating the State Department’s Special Envoy to Monitor and Combat Antisemitism to the rank of ambassador.

In February 2020, he met senior officials in the Saudi government and also advocated for Eastern European Jewry.

In the wake of the October 7 attacks, Daroff was the main -co-organizer of the November 2023 March for Israel event in Washington attended by close to 300,000 people.

In December 2023, Daroff was selected as the inaugural chair of the J7, the Large Jewish Communities’ Task Force Against Antisemitism, representing seven major Diaspora Jewish communities.

In May 2026, he was named as the first rotating chair of the J-50 by Israeli Foreign Minister Gideon Sa'ar. This body connects Israel’s Foreign Ministry with leaders of major Jewish communities worldwide.

In June 2026, Daroff met the Egyptian President Abdel Fattah El-Sisi.

== Boards and Committees ==
He was a member of the Board of the World Council of Jewish Communal Service as well as Vice President of the Board of the Jewish Communal Service Association of North America. He has also served in leadership positions with the Jewish Federation of Greater Washington.

He is a life member of the Council on Foreign Relations.

President George W. Bush appointed Daroff to serve on the honorary delegation to accompany him to Jerusalem for the celebration of the 60th anniversary of the State of Israel in May 2008. In September 2007, Daroff was appointed by President George W. Bush to be a member of the U.S. Commission for the Preservation of America's Heritage Abroad, which is charged with the oversight of the protection of properties in Europe associated with the heritage of U.S. citizens, including Jewish cemeteries, synagogues, and memorials. He served during the Obama Administration as well, leaving the Commission in 2011.

Daroff is also an adjunct professor at The George Washington University’s School of Political Management in Washington.

He is a judge of the National Jewish Book Awards and an officer of the Jewish Book Council. He is also on the Nefesh B’Nefesh’s Bonei Zion award selection committee.

== Awards and Honors ==
Daroff was named one of the 50 most influential Jews in America by The Jewish Daily Forward newspaper. Slate Magazine stated, "Daroff is also one of the country's better-connected Jewish operatives." He is widely quoted in newspapers, magazines, on the radio, and television across the world.

In 2023, he was named by The Jerusalem Post as one of the world’s 50 most influential Jews.

In May 2009, Daroff was named by the Jewish Telegraphic Agency (JTA) as being among the most influential Jewish Twitterers in the world for his tweeting from @Daroff.

He has also been widely quoted in leading news outlets, including The New York Times, The Washington Post, USA Today, The Los Angeles Times, and Newsweek,

He is a regular columnist for the Jerusalem Post.

In 1992 he was commissioned by Governor Brereton C. Jones as a Kentucky Colonel.

In July 2026 he was inducted into the Association of Ohio Commodores.

In September 2026, he was named by The Jerusalem Post as one of the world’s 50 most influential Jews.

== Personal ==
He is married to Heidi Krizer Daroff and has two children. They met in Kraków in 1995 while studying at Jagiellonian University.
