= University of Toledo College of Law =

Public law school in Toledo, Ohio, US

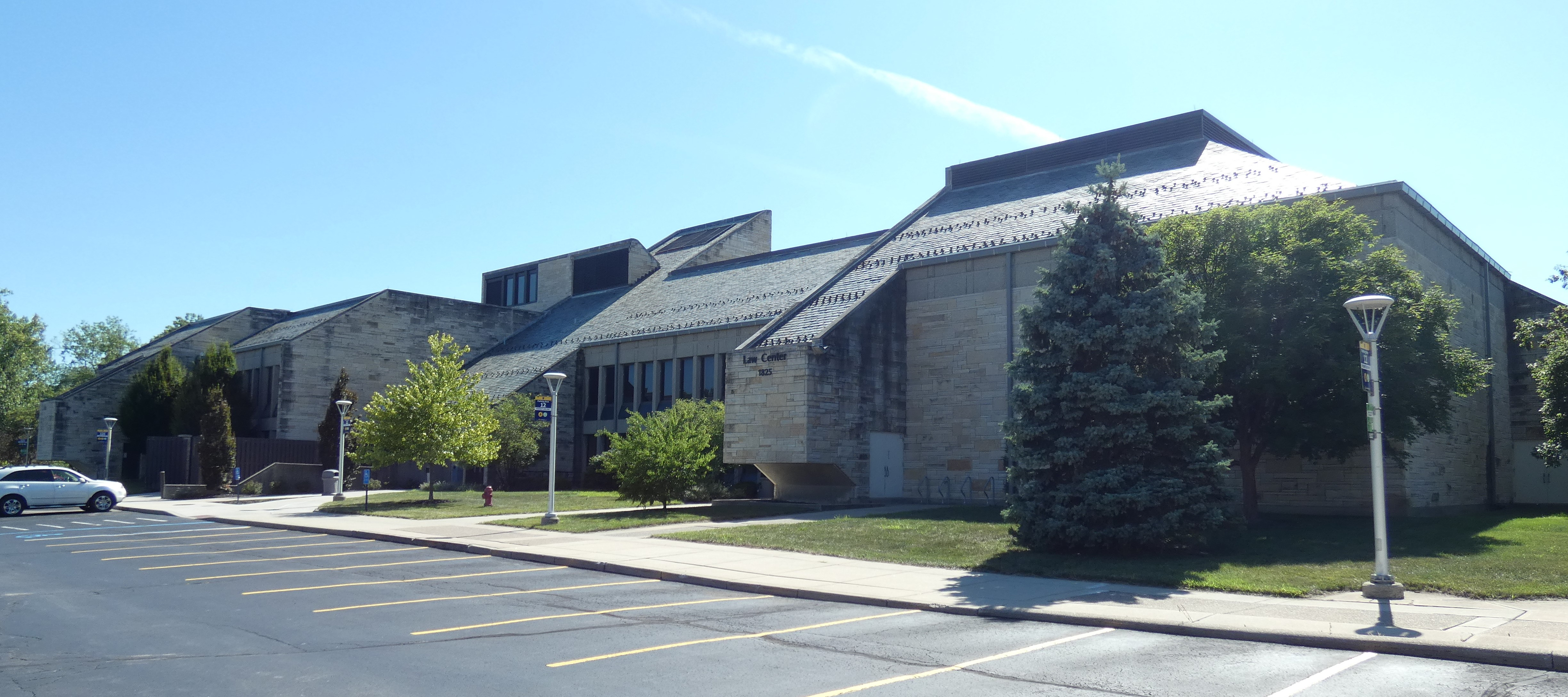
- Parent school: University of Toledo
- Established: 1906
- School type: Public
- Dean: D. Benjamin Barros
- Location: Toledo, Ohio, United States; 41°39′31″N 83°37′13″W
- Enrollment: 355
- Faculty: 42 (22 FT)
- USNWR ranking: 150th (tie) (2025)
- Bar pass rate: 65.96% (2022 first time takers)
- Website: law.utoledo.edu

The University of Toledo College of Law is the law school at the University of Toledo, and is located on the university's main campus in a residential neighborhood in western Toledo, Ohio. The school is accredited by the American Bar Association and is a member of the Association of American Law Schools.

The College of Law offers a three-year, full-time program leading to a Juris Doctor degree. It also offers Certificates of Concentration, permitting a student to focus on a particular field of interest such as Criminal, Environmental, or International Law.

According to the College of Law's official 2013 ABA-required disclosures, 48.3% of the class of 2013 obtained full-time, long-term, bar passage-required employment nine months after graduation, excluding solo-practitioners.

== History ==
The College of Law was established in 1906. The school was accredited by the American Bar Association in 1939 and joined the Association of American Law Schools in 1941.

== Academics ==
First-year students are required to take classes on civil procedure, constitutional law, contracts, criminal law, property, torts, and legal research, writing, and appellate advocacy. The school offers more than 90 classes beyond the first-year curriculum and students can earn certificates in six concentrations: criminal law, environmental law, intellectual property law, health law, or labor and employment law.

Students can attend the College of Law on a full-time or part-time basis. As of 2022, the school had 42 total faculty members including 20 part-time, and a student-full time faculty ratio of 16.14 to 1.

University of Toledo College of Law students may participate in clinics focused on civil advocacy, criminal law practice, dispute resolution, domestic violence and juvenile issue, and public service externships.

College of Law students may participate in 28 extra-curricular groups.

== Admissions ==
In 2022, University of Toledo College of Law accepted 43.68% applicants with 15.88% of those accepted enrolling, all of whom were enrolled full-time. As of 2022, 14.37% all of the J.D. students were minorities.

The LSAT range for students admitted in 2022 was 149-155 with an average of 152, and the median undergraduate GPA was 3.55.

== Post-graduation employment ==
According to University of Toledo College of Law's official 2013 ABA-required disclosures, 48.3% of the class of 2013 obtained full-time, long-term, bar passage-required employment nine months after graduation, excluding solo-practitioners. The school ranked 126th out of 201 ABA-approved law schools in terms of the percentage of 2013 graduates with non-school-funded, full-time, long-term, bar passage required jobs nine months after graduation.

University of Toledo School of Law's Law School Transparency under-employment score was 28%, indicating the percentage of the class of 2013 unemployed, pursuing an additional degree, or working in a non-professional, short-term, or part-time job nine months after graduation. 82.2% of the class of 2013 were employed in some capacity while 2.5% were pursuing graduate degrees and 11% were unemployed nine months graduation.

The top three employment destinations for 2013 University of Toledo School of Law graduates were Ohio, Michigan, and California.

== Costs ==
The total cost of full-time attendance (indicating the cost of tuition, fees, and living expenses) at the University of Toledo College of Law for the 2022–2023 academic year was $46,509 for Ohio residents living on campus and $46,709 for non-residents living on-campus. The schools's tuition and fees for Ohio residents on average increased by 3.78% annually over the past five years.

The 2013 Law School Transparency estimated debt-financed cost of attendance for three years was $157,733. The average indebtedness of the 88% of 2013 College of Law graduates who took out loans was $99,889.

== Rankings ==
The University of Toledo College of Law ranked #141 in U.S. News & World Report's 2023 law school rankings. The school ranked tied for #55 in U.S. News & World Report's ranking of part-time law programs.

== Alumni ==
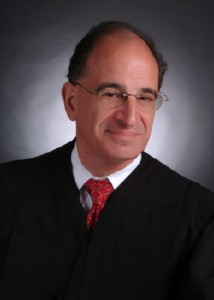
Jack Zouhary

- Jack Zouhary, judge of the United States District Court for the Northern District of Ohio (2006–present)
- James R. Knepp II, judge of the United States District Court for the Northern District of Ohio (2020-present)
- Nicholas Joseph Walinski, Jr., former judge of the United States District Court for the Northern District of Ohio (1970–1985)
- Richard B. McQuade Jr., former judge of the United States District Court for the Northern District of Ohio (1986–1989)
- Joseph James Farnan, Jr., former judge of the United States District Court for the District of Delaware (1985–2010)
- Tyrone Yates, former member of the Ohio House of Representatives for the 33rd District (2003–2010)
- Bob Latta, member of the U.S. House of Representatives for the 5th congressional district (2007–present)
- Judith Lanzinger, former Associate Justice of the Ohio Supreme Court (2005–2016)
- Betty Montgomery, former Ohio Attorney General (1995–2003) and Ohio Auditor (2003–2007)
- Anthony P. Capozzi, former president of the State Bar of California
- Matt Szollosi, former Assistant Minority Leader of the Ohio House of Representatives (2007–2013)
- Andrew Douglas, former Associate Justice of the Ohio Supreme Court (1985–2002)
- Bill Cunningham, radio and television talk show host and conservative commentator
- Alan G. Lance, Sr., former judge of the United States Court of Appeals for Veterans Claims (2004–2017)
- Josh Williams (Ohio politician), member of the Ohio House of Representatives
