= Conference of Presidents of Major American Jewish Organizations =

Jewish umbrella organization in the U.S.

- Formation: 1956; 70 years ago
- Type: 501(c)(4)
- Legal status: Nonprofit organization
- Headquarters: 633 Third Avenue, New York, New York, US
- Coordinates: 40.749683°N 73.974957°W
- Members: 50
- Chair: Betsy Berns Korn
- Chief Executive Officer: William Daroff
- Subsidiaries: Conference of Presidents Fund _{501(c)(3)}
- Website: conferenceofpresidents.org

The Conference of Presidents of Major American Jewish Organizations (CoP; commonly Presidents' Conference) is the umbrella organization for the American Jewish community. Comprising 53 national Jewish organizations across the political spectrum, it was founded in 1955 to develop a consensus voice among Jewish organizations, especially to the U.S. government.

Along with the Jewish Federations of North America, Hillel International, and the Anti-Defamation League, the CoP is considered to represent mainstream Jewry in the United States. Since the 1970s, the CoP's chairperson is the American Jewish community's de facto spokesperson on international affairs.

== Mission ==
The Conference of Presidents of Major Jewish Organizations (CoP) is the unofficial umbrella body of the American Jewish community, formed to articulate a communal consensus, generally to the Executive Branch of the United States federal government. In the 21st century, it has also become a representative communal voice to Israel and other countries.

Together with the Jewish Federations of North America, Hillel International, the Anti-Defamation League, CoP represents the mainstream of the American Jewish community. Its chairperson functions as the community's de facto spokesperson on international affairs, especially regarding srael, owing to the CoP's capacity to forge consensus among the largest Jewish organizations and speak for the majority of affiliated American Jews.

== History ==
=== Formation ===
The Conference of Presidents was formed when Jewish groups felt a need to respond to the perceived tilt of the Eisenhower administration away from Israel. In 1954, U.S. Assistant Secretary of State Henry Byroade attempted to intimidate Israel, B'nai B'rith president Philip Klutznick invited the leaders of 16 American Jewish organizations to meet in New York City as the Conference of Presidents of Major American Jewish Organizations. In March 1955, the conference had 20 members and met in Washington, D.C. to discuss the Middle East. The 1955 conference was the first public forum that enabled the American government to hear the opinions of the largest representative body of American Jews after World War II. At the forum, the Conference of Presidents declared its goals as three-fold: 1) the defense of American and the welfare of its people, 2) the spread of freedom and attainment of peace throughout the world, and 3) the attainment of peace, development, and security for the people of Israel in their ancestral homeland.

In the early years, the Conference of Presidents, like other coordinating agencies such as the Council of Jewish Federations, the Jewish Welfare Board, and the Synagogue Council of America, operated mainly as coordinating bodies with no powers of coercion over their constituent members. However, these groups were able to forge unprecedented levels of cooperation largely because there was a strong consensus about the Jewish communal agenda.

=== Growth ===
By the 1970s, the Conference of Presidents and AIPAC assumed overall responsibility for Israel-related lobbying within the Jewish communal landscape. The Conference of Presidents was responsible for speaking to the Executive Branch of the U.S. government, while AIPAC dealt mainly with the legislative branch.

For its first 30 years, the organization was headed by Yehuda Hellman. After Hellman's death in 1986, Malcolm Hoenlein became chairman. Hoenlein took a much stronger role in shaping US policy, especially within the executive branch. By 1990, the group grew to 48 members and 8 official observers. By then, its mission was to "strengthen the US-Israel alliance and protect and enhance the security and dignity of Jews abroad."

In December 2008, the conference presented Canadian Prime Minister Stephen Harper, and his government as a whole, with its inaugural "International Leadership Award" for his support for Israel. Malcolm Hoenlein, the executive vice-chairman of the conference, stated that the award was given to express the group's appreciation for Canada's "courageous stands" to boycott the Durban II anti-racism conference. He also praised Canada's "support for Israel and [its] efforts at the U.N. against incitement and ... the delegitimization [of Israel], where they have taken a role in the forefront."

On February 12, 2009, a CoP delegation met with Pope Benedict XVI at the Vatican to re-assert the importance of Jewish–Catholic relations in the wake of the controversy over controversial comments by Society of St. Pius X bishop Richard Williamson.

=== 2020s ===
On August 4, 2019, William Daroff was announced as CEO, succeeding Hoenlein after 33 years in the role and assumed the position in February 2020. Daroff was previously a senior official at the Jewish Federations of North America. The Conference of Presidents co-organized the March for Israel on November 14, 2023. Daroff claimed that more than 290,000 people attended the rally, making it "the largest pro-Israel gathering in US history".

Progressive Jewish groups have floated leaving the Conference, particularly after the Conference declined to extend membership to liberal group J Street in 2014. In 2023, progressive group The Workers Circle withdrew from the Conference over what The Workers Circle claimed as policy differences. CoP CEO William Daroff stated that The Workers Circle owed $15,000 in membership fees and had not raised any concerns prior to its announcement. Other left-leaning Jewish groups expressed that they would remain in the Conference.

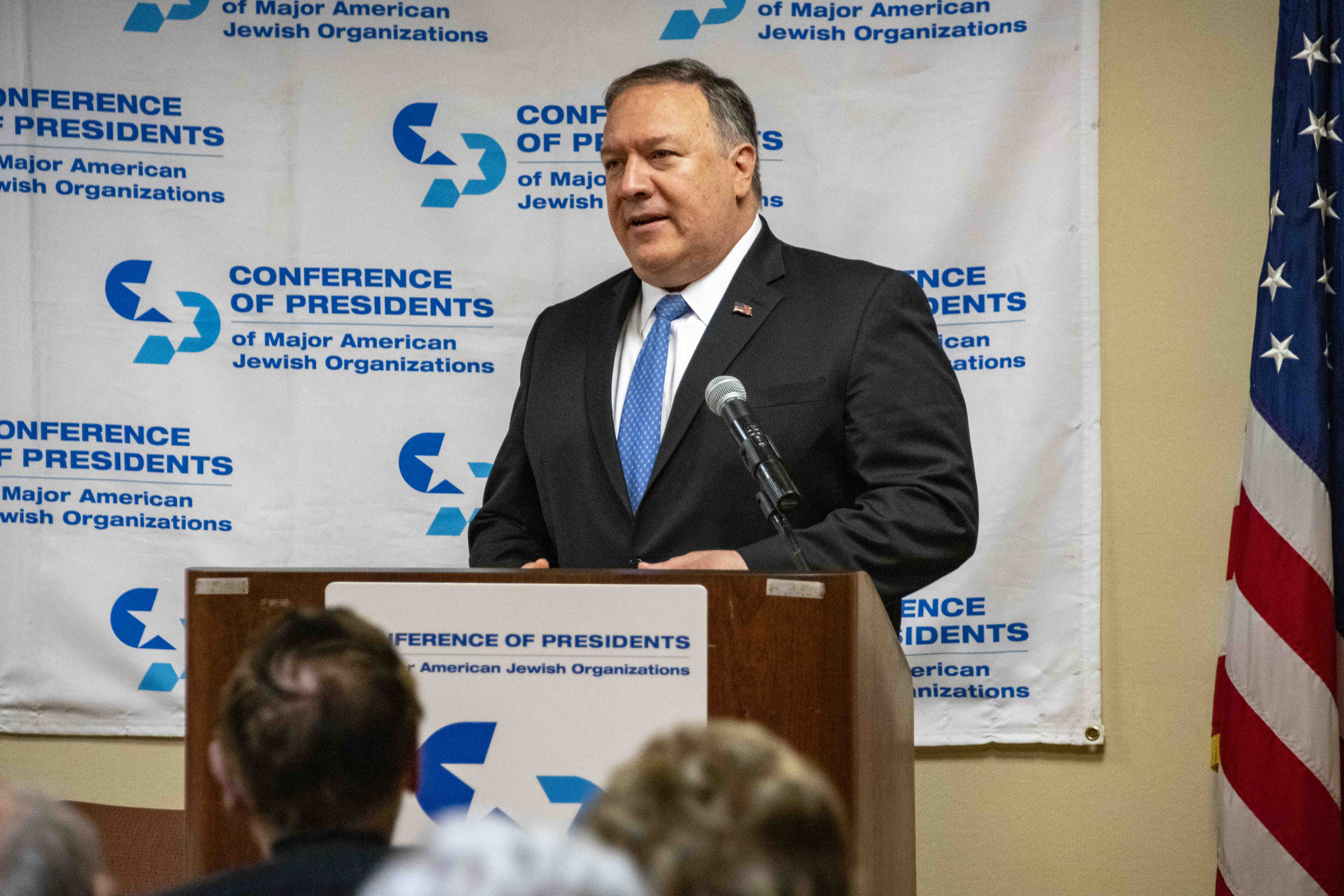
US Secretary of State Mike Pompeo speaks at the CoP on 28 May 2019

As of 2026, the CoP comprised 55 American Jewish groups from across the political spectrum. According to CEO William Daroff, the CoP represents the views of liberal groups critical of Israel like J Street, but explicitly anti-Zionist groups like Jewish Voice for Peace and IfNotNow were "beyond the pale." The CoP pulled out of meetings with the Biden administration in 2024 over the inclusion of a group closely associated with IfNotNow.

Citing the CoP as a model, the Conference of Presidents of Christian Organizations in Support of Israel launched in September 2024.

== See also ==
- Board of Deputies of British Jews
- American Israel Public Affairs Committee
- Anti-Defamation League
- Jewish lobby
- Jewish Council for Public Affairs
