= John Capozzi =

American politician (born 1956)

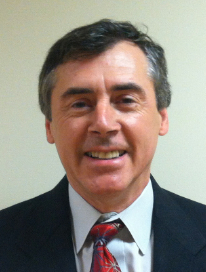

Shadow Member of the U.S. House of Representatives from the District of Columbia's at-large district
- In office January 3, 1995 – January 3, 1997
- Preceded by: Charles Moreland
- Succeeded by: Sabrina Sojourner

Personal details
- Born: 1956 (age 69–70) Montville, New Jersey, U.S.
- Party: Democratic
- Education: Shippensburg University (BA); American University (MPA)

John James Capozzi, Jr. (born 1956) is an American politician who served as Shadow U.S. Representative for the District of Columbia between 1995 and 1997 and was a member of the District of Columbia Democratic State Committee for over 20 years, most recently as chair of the Environmental Caucus. He is also a non-member affiliate of the Rent Is Too Damn High Party.

== Political career ==
Prior to his election as Shadow U.S. Representative of the District of Columbia, Capozzi was involved in organizing protests in front of the Rayburn House office building in support of DC Statehood. He met with a number of Congresspersons prior to the 1993 vote for DC Statehood, the only vote of its kind to be held by the House of Representatives until 2022.

As the Shadow Representative, Capozzi worked with the Reverend Garyland Ellis Hagler and Council member William Lightfoot in pointing out Fannie Mae, then the largest private sector company in DC, was exempt from paying DC corporate income taxes. As a shareholder in the company, Capozzi sponsored a s shareholder's initiative to have the company make a payment, in lieu of taxes, to DC.

Rather than run for reelection in 1996, Capozzi ran as in the race to become an at-large councilmember on the Council of the District of Columbia and was defeated September 10, 1996.

In 2002, at Capozzi's initiative, the DC Council debated a proposal to change the District's flag in protest of DC's lack of voting rights in Congress. The new design would have added the letters "D.C." to the center start and the words "Taxation without Representation" in white on the upper and lower bars, the format already used on District licence plates. The change, presumably, would have been temporary and revoked once the city achieved equal representation or statehood. Capozzi's proposal was passed by the council by a 10–2 vote, but the final design was never adopted.

In 2012, Capozzi was among the candidates who ran to replace at-large councilman Phil Mendelson. Mendelson resigned his council seat after incumbent Council Chairman Kwame Brown resigned because of legal troubles. In a vote on December 10 by the District of Columbia Democratic State Committee, Capozzi placed third out of three candidates behind winner Anita Bonds and Doug Sloan.

== Successful electoral history ==
1994 United States Shadow Representative election in the District of Columbia
Primary election
Party	Candidate	Votes	%
Democratic	John Capozzi	85,366	94.36
Write-in		5,101	5.64
Total votes		90,467	100.00
General election
Democratic	John Capozzi	104,532	68.65
Republican	Edward D. Turpin	18,756	12.32
DC Statehood	Paul McAllister	14,147	9.29
Independent	Keith Mitchell (Withdrawn)	13,190	8.66
Write-in		1,644	1.08
Total votes		152,269	100.00
Democratic hold			

== Environmental advocacy ==
=== Green Home in Hillcrest ===
In August 2009 Capozzi made headlines in a local publication, East of the River. The former shadow Rep was highlighted by reporter, Gerri Williams in an article called 'A Green Home in Hillcrest'. Capozzi and his wife Sue built the first Green Home with solar panels and LED thermal heating and cooling located in the South East region of Washington, D.C.

Solar energy was not new to Capozzi, as his parents installed solar in their home in 1976.

=== Green Power Advocacy ===
Since 2010 Capozzi, has been an active DC SUN member, filed a shareholder resolution with Pepco to force the company to reduce total greenhouse gas emissions from products and operations. He was quoted by a District of Columbia advocacy group, The Fight Back, as saying, "If they were making more money through solar then maybe they would have had more capacity to do a better job with reliability."

== Personal life ==
He previously worked for BRMi Consulting as a Recruitment Manager, and has worked for the D.C. Office of the Chief Technology Officer of the District of Columbia with human resources, community outreach, and digital in conclusion.

== See also ==
- Shadow congressperson
- Political party strength in Washington, D.C.

U.S. House of Representatives
Preceded by Charles Moreland	Shadow Member of the U.S. House of Representatives from the District of Columbia's at-large congressional district 1995–1997	Succeeded by Sabrina Sojourner
