= Judge Norris =

Judge Norris may refer to:

- Alan Eugene Norris (born 1935), judge of the United States Court of Appeals for the Sixth Circuit
- Mark Norris (judge) (born 1955), judge of the United States District Court for the Western District of Tennessee
- William Albert Norris (1927–2017), judge of the United States Court of Appeals for the Ninth Circuit
