= Judge McNamee =

Judge McNamee may refer to:

- Charles Joseph McNamee (1890–1964), judge of the United States District Court for the Northern District of Ohio
- Stephen M. McNamee (born 1942), judge of the United States District Court for the District of Arizona
