= List of United States Supreme Court cases, volume 262 =

Supreme Court of the United States
- Interactive map of Supreme Court of the United States
- 38°53′26″N 77°00′16″W
- Established: March 4, 1789; 237 years ago
- Location: Washington, D.C.
- Coordinates: 38°53′26″N 77°00′16″W
- Composition method: Presidential nomination with Senate confirmation
- Authorised by: Constitution of the United States, Art. III, § 1
- Judge term length: life tenure, subject to impeachment and removal
- Number of positions: 9 (by statute)
- Website: supremecourt.gov

This is a list of cases reported in volume 262 of United States Reports, decided by the Supreme Court of the United States in 1923.

== Justices of the Supreme Court at the time of volume 262 U.S. ==
The Supreme Court is established by Article III, Section 1 of the Constitution of the United States, which says: "The judicial Power of the United States, shall be vested in one supreme Court . . .". The size of the Court is not specified; the Constitution leaves it to Congress to set the number of justices. Under the Judiciary Act of 1789 Congress originally fixed the number of justices at six (one chief justice and five associate justices). Since 1789 Congress has varied the size of the Court from six to seven, nine, ten, and back to nine justices (always including one chief justice).

When the cases in volume 262 were decided the Court comprised the following nine members:

Portrait	Justice	Office	Home State	Succeeded	Date confirmed by the Senate (Vote)	Tenure on Supreme Court
	William Howard Taft	Chief Justice	Connecticut	Edward Douglass White	June 30, 1921 (Acclamation)	July 11, 1921 – February 3, 1930 (Retired)
	Joseph McKenna	Associate Justice	California	Stephen Johnson Field	January 21, 1898 (Acclamation)	January 26, 1898 – January 5, 1925 (Retired)
	Oliver Wendell Holmes Jr.	Associate Justice	Massachusetts	Horace Gray	December 4, 1902 (Acclamation)	December 8, 1902 – January 12, 1932 (Retired)
	Willis Van Devanter	Associate Justice	Wyoming	Edward Douglass White (as Associate Justice)	December 15, 1910 (Acclamation)	January 3, 1911 – June 2, 1937 (Retired)
	James Clark McReynolds	Associate Justice	Tennessee	Horace Harmon Lurton	August 29, 1914 (44–6)	October 12, 1914 – January 31, 1941 (Retired)
	Louis Brandeis	Associate Justice	Massachusetts	Joseph Rucker Lamar	June 1, 1916 (47–22)	June 5, 1916 – February 13, 1939 (Retired)
	George Sutherland	Associate Justice	Utah	John Hessin Clarke	September 5, 1922 (Acclamation)	October 2, 1922 – January 17, 1938 (Retired)
	Pierce Butler	Associate Justice	Minnesota	William R. Day	December 21, 1922 (61–8)	January 2, 1923 – November 16, 1939 (Died)
	Edward Terry Sanford	Associate Justice	Tennessee	Mahlon Pitney	January 29, 1923 (Acclamation)	February 19, 1923 – March 8, 1930 (Died)

== Notable case in 262 U.S. ==
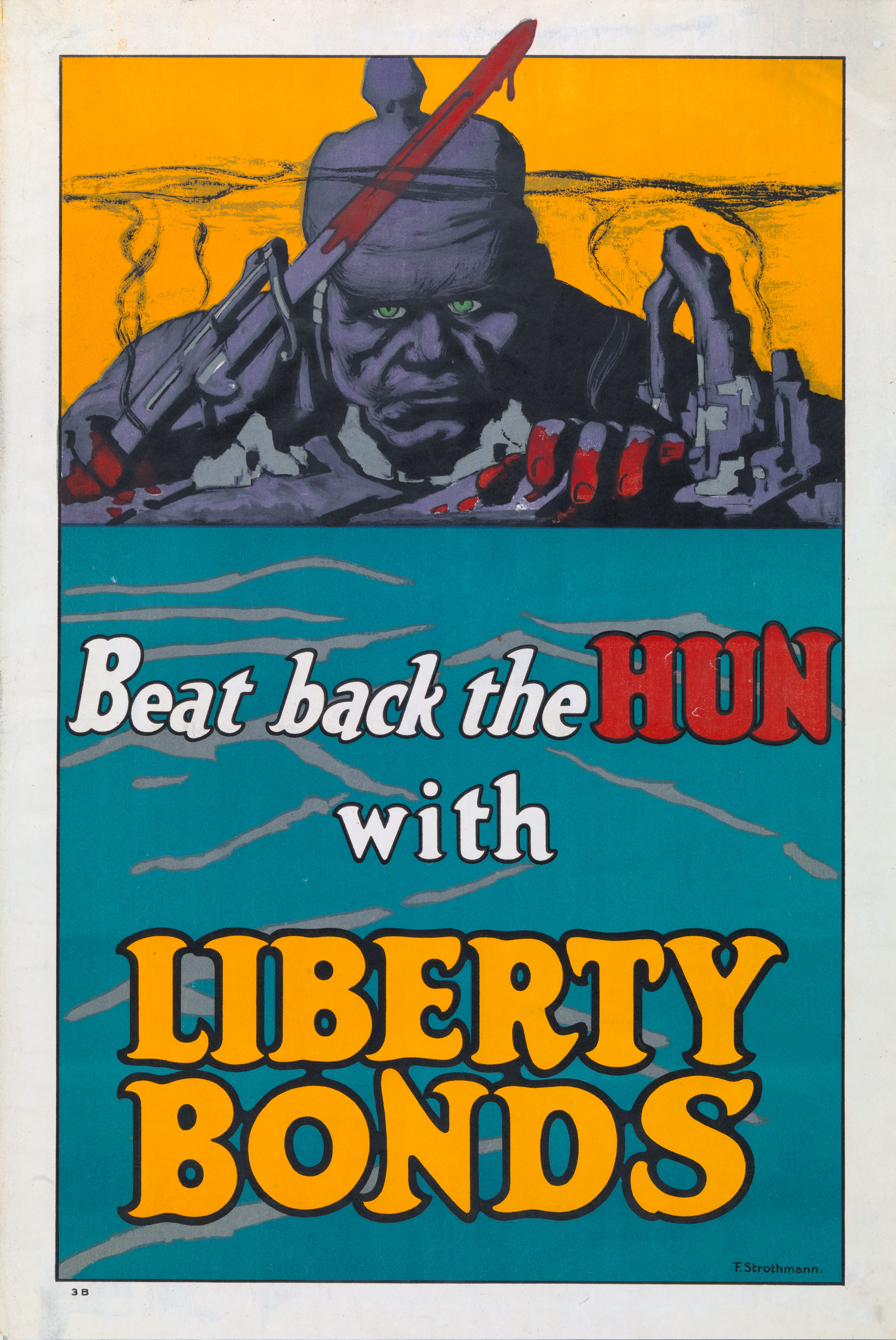
United States 1918 bond posters with germanophobic slogans

=== Meyer v. Nebraska ===
In Meyer v. Nebraska, 262 U.S. 390 (1923), the Supreme Court held that a 1919 Nebraska law restricting foreign-language education violated the Due Process Clause of the Fourteenth Amendment to the United States Constitution. The Nebraska law had been passed during World War I, during a period of heightened anti-German sentiment in the United States. The Court held that the liberties protected by the Fourteenth Amendment applied to foreign-language speakers. Meyer, along with Pierce v. Society of Sisters (1925), is often cited as one of the first instances in which the U.S. Supreme Court engaged in substantive due process in the area of civil liberties. Harvard Law Professor Laurence Tribe has called them "the two sturdiest pillars of the substantive due process temple". He noted that the decisions in these cases did not describe specific acts as constitutionally protected but a broader area of liberty: "[they] described what they were protecting from the standardizing hand of the state in language that spoke of the family as a center of value-formation and value-transmission ... the authority of parents to make basic choices" and not just controlling the subjects one's child is taught.

== Citation style ==
Under the Judiciary Act of 1789 the federal court structure at the time comprised District Courts, which had general trial jurisdiction; Circuit Courts, which had mixed trial and appellate (from the US District Courts) jurisdiction; and the United States Supreme Court, which had appellate jurisdiction over the federal District and Circuit courts—and for certain issues over state courts. The Supreme Court also had limited original jurisdiction (i.e., in which cases could be filed directly with the Supreme Court without first having been heard by a lower federal or state court). There were one or more federal District Courts and/or Circuit Courts in each state, territory, or other geographical region.

The Judiciary Act of 1891 created the United States Courts of Appeals and reassigned the jurisdiction of most routine appeals from the district and circuit courts to these appellate courts. The Act created nine new courts that were originally known as the "United States Circuit Courts of Appeals." The new courts had jurisdiction over most appeals of lower court decisions. The Supreme Court could review either legal issues that a court of appeals certified or decisions of court of appeals by writ of certiorari. On January 1, 1912, the effective date of the Judicial Code of 1911, the old Circuit Courts were abolished, with their remaining trial court jurisdiction transferred to the U.S. District Courts.

Bluebook citation style is used for case names, citations, and jurisdictions.

- "# Cir." = United States Court of Appeals
  - e.g., "3d Cir." = United States Court of Appeals for the Third Circuit
- "D." = United States District Court for the District of . . .
  - e.g.,"D. Mass." = United States District Court for the District of Massachusetts
- "E." = Eastern; "M." = Middle; "N." = Northern; "S." = Southern; "W." = Western
  - e.g.,"M.D. Ala." = United States District Court for the Middle District of Alabama
- "Ct. Cl." = United States Court of Claims
- The abbreviation of a state's name alone indicates the highest appellate court in that state's judiciary at the time.
  - e.g.,"Pa." = Supreme Court of Pennsylvania
  - e.g.,"Me." = Supreme Judicial Court of Maine

== List of cases in volume 262 U.S. ==
Case Name	Page and year	Opinion of the Court	Concurring opinion(s)	Dissenting opinion(s)	Lower Court	Disposition
Chicago Board of Trade v. Olsen	1 (1923)	Taft	none	none	N.D. Ill.	affirmed
Prendergast v. New York Telephone Company	43 (1923)	Sanford	none	none	S.D.N.Y.	affirmed
Commercial Trust Company of New Jersey v. Miller, Alien Property Custodian	51 (1923)	McKenna	none	none	3d Cir.	affirmed
United States Trust Company of New York v. Miller, Alien Property Custodian	58 (1923)	McKenna	none	none	D.N.J.	affirmed
Ahrenfeldt v. Miller, Alien Property Custodian	60 (1923)	McKenna	none	none	3d Cir.	affirmed
United States v. Luskey	62 (1923)	McKenna	none	none	Ct. Cl.	affirmed
United States v. Mossel	65 (1923)	McKenna	none	none	Ct. Cl.	affirmed
A.G. Spalding and Brothers v. Edwards	66 (1923)	Holmes	none	none	S.D.N.Y.	reversed
St. Louis Southwestern Railway Company v. United States	70 (1923)	Brandeis	none	none	Ct. Cl.	affirmed
Lion Bonding and Surety Company v. Karatz I	77 (1923)	Brandeis	none	none	8th Cir.	reversed
Ex parte Fuller	91 (1923)	Taft	none	none	S.D.N.Y.	stay denied
New York ex rel. Clyde v. Gilchrist	94 (1923)	Holmes	none	none	N.Y. Sup. Ct.	affirmed
Cunard Steamship Company, Ltd. v. Mellon, Secretary of the Treasury	100 (1923)	VanDevanter	none	Sutherland	S.D.N.Y.	multiple
Cullinan v. Walker, Collector of Internal Revenue	134 (1923)	Brandeis	none	none	S.D. Tex.	affirmed
Yuma County Water Users' Association v. Schlecht	138 (1923)	Sutherland	none	none	9th Cir.	affirmed
Dier v. Banton	147 (1923)	Taft	none	none	S.D.N.Y.	affirmed
Essgee Company of China v. United States	151 (1923)	Taft	none	none	S.D.N.Y.	affirmed
Magnum Import Company, Inc. v. Coty	159 (1923)	Taft	none	none	2d Cir.	suspension denied
United States v. Sischo	165 (1923)	Holmes	none	none	9th Cir.	reversed
Bianchi v. Morales	170 (1923)	Holmes	none	none	D.P.R.	affirmed
Oliver Iron Mining Company v. Lord	172 (1923)	VanDevanter	none	none	D. Minn.	affirmed
City of Trenton v. New Jersey	182 (1923)	Butler	none	none	N.J. Sup. Ct.	dismissed
City of Newark v. New Jersey	192 (1923)	Butler	none	none	N.J. Sup. Ct.	dismissed
Begg v. City of New York	196 (1923)	Sanford	none	none	2d Cir.	dismissed
Work v. United States ex rel. McAlester-Edwards Company	200 (1923)	Taft	none	none	D.C. Cir.	affirmed
American Steel Founderies v. Robertson	209 (1923)	Taft	none	none	N.D. Ill.	reversed
Curtis, Collins and Holbrook Company v. United States	215 (1923)	Taft	none	none	9th Cir.	affirmed
Wagner Electric Manufacturing Company v. Lyndon	226 (1923)	Taft	none	none	E.D. Mo.	dismissed
Graham v. Du Pont	234 (1923)	Taft	none	none	3d Cir.	reversed
Tulsidas v. Insular Collector of Customs	258 (1923)	McKenna	none	none	Phil.	affirmed
Stevens v. Arnold	266 (1923)	Holmes	none	none	3d Cir.	reversed
Hart v. B.F. Keith Vaudeville Exchange	271 (1923)	Holmes	none	none	S.D.N.Y.	reversed
Ex parte Davis	274 (1923)	McReynolds	none	none	S.D.N.Y.	prohibition denied
Missouri ex rel. Southwestern Bell Telephone Company v. Public Service Commission of Missouri	276 (1923)	McReynolds	Brandeis	none	Mo.	reversed
Davis v. Farmers Cooperative Equity Company	312 (1923)	Brandeis	none	none	Minn.	reversed
Nashville, Chattanooga and St. Louis Railway v. Tennessee	318 (1923)	Brandeis	none	none	M.D. Tenn.	reversed
South Utah Mines and Smelters v. Beaver County	325 (1923)	Sutherland	none	none	D. Utah	reversed
Riddle v. Dyche	333 (1923)	Sutherland	none	none	N.D. Ga.	affirmed
L. Vogelstein and Company, Inc. v. United States	337 (1923)	Butler	none	none	Ct. Cl.	affirmed
United States v. New River Collieries Company	341 (1923)	Butler	none	none	3d Cir.	affirmed
International Life Insurance Company v. Sherman	346 (1923)	Butler	none	none	Mo.	dismissed
Campbell v. City of Olney	352 (1923)	Butler	none	none	Young County Ct.	dismissed
McCarthy v. Arndstein	355 (1923)	Sanford	none	none	S.D.N.Y.	affirmed
Houston Coal Company v. United States	361 (1923)	McReynolds	none	none	S.D. Ohio	reversed
First National Bank of San Jose v. California	366 (1923)	McReynolds	none	none	Cal.	reversed
United States v. American Linseed Oil Company	371 (1923)	McReynolds	none	none	N.D. Ill.	reversed
Meyer v. Nebraska	390 (1923)	McReynolds	none	none	Neb.	reversed
Bartels v. Iowa	404 (1923)	McReynolds	none	Holmes	multiple	reversed
Atlantic Coast Line Railroad Company v. Daughton	413 (1923)	Brandeis	none	none	E.D.N.C.	affirmed
Collins v. Loisel	426 (1923)	Brandeis	none	none	E.D. La.	affirmed
Georgia Railway and Power Company v. City of Decatur	432 (1923)	Sutherland	none	none	Ga.	reversed
Georgia Railway and Power Company v. City of College Park	441 (1923)	Sutherland	none	none	Ga.	reversed
Brush Electric Company v. City of Galveston	443 (1923)	Sutherland	none	none	S.D. Tex.	affirmed
Massachusetts v. Mellon	447 (1923)	Sutherland	none	none	D.C. Cir.	multiple
Willard, Sutherland and Company v. United States	489 (1923)	Butler	none	none	Ct. Cl.	affirmed
William C. Atwater and Company, Inc. v. United States	495 (1923)	Butler	none	none	Ct. Cl.	affirmed
Madera Sugar Pine Company v. Industrial Accident Commission of California	499 (1923)	Sanford	none	none	Cal.	affirmed
Sonneborn Brothers v. Cureton	506 (1923)	Taft	McReynolds	none	W.D. Tex.	affirmed
Chas. Wolff Packing Company v. Court of Industrial Relations (Kansas)	522 (1923)	Taft	none	none	Kan.	reversed
Kentucky Finance Corporation v. Paramount Auto Exchange	544 (1923)	VanDevanter	none	Brandeis	Wis.	reversed
Pennsylvania v. West Virginia	553 (1923)	VanDevanter	none	Holmes; McReynolds; Brandeis	original	decree for Pa.
Georgia Railway and Power Company v. Railroad Commission of Georgia	625 (1923)	Brandeis	none	McKenna	N.D. Ga.	affirmed
Lion Bonding and Surety Company v. Karatz II	640 (1923)	Brandeis	none	none	8th Cir.	modification denied
American Bank and Trust Company v. Federal Reserve Bank of Atlanta	643 (1923)	Brandeis	none	none	5th Cir.	affirmed
Farmers and Merchants Bank of Monroe, North Carolina v. Federal Reserve Bank of Richmond	649 (1923)	Brandeis	none	none	N.C.	reversed
Joslin Manufacturing Company v. City of Providence	668 (1923)	Sutherland	none	none	R.I. Super. Ct.	affirmed
Bluefield Water Works and Improvement Company v. Public Service Commission of West Virginia	679 (1923)	Butler	none	none	W. Va.	reversed
City National Bank of El Paso v. El Paso and Northeastern Railroad Company	695 (1923)	Butler	none	none	Tex. Civ. App.	affirmed
Rindge Company v. Los Angeles County	700 (1923)	Sanford	none	none	Cal. Ct. App.	affirmed
Milheim v. Moffat Tunnel Improvement District	710 (1923)	Sanford	none	none	Colo.	affirmed
