= Samuel H. West =

American judge

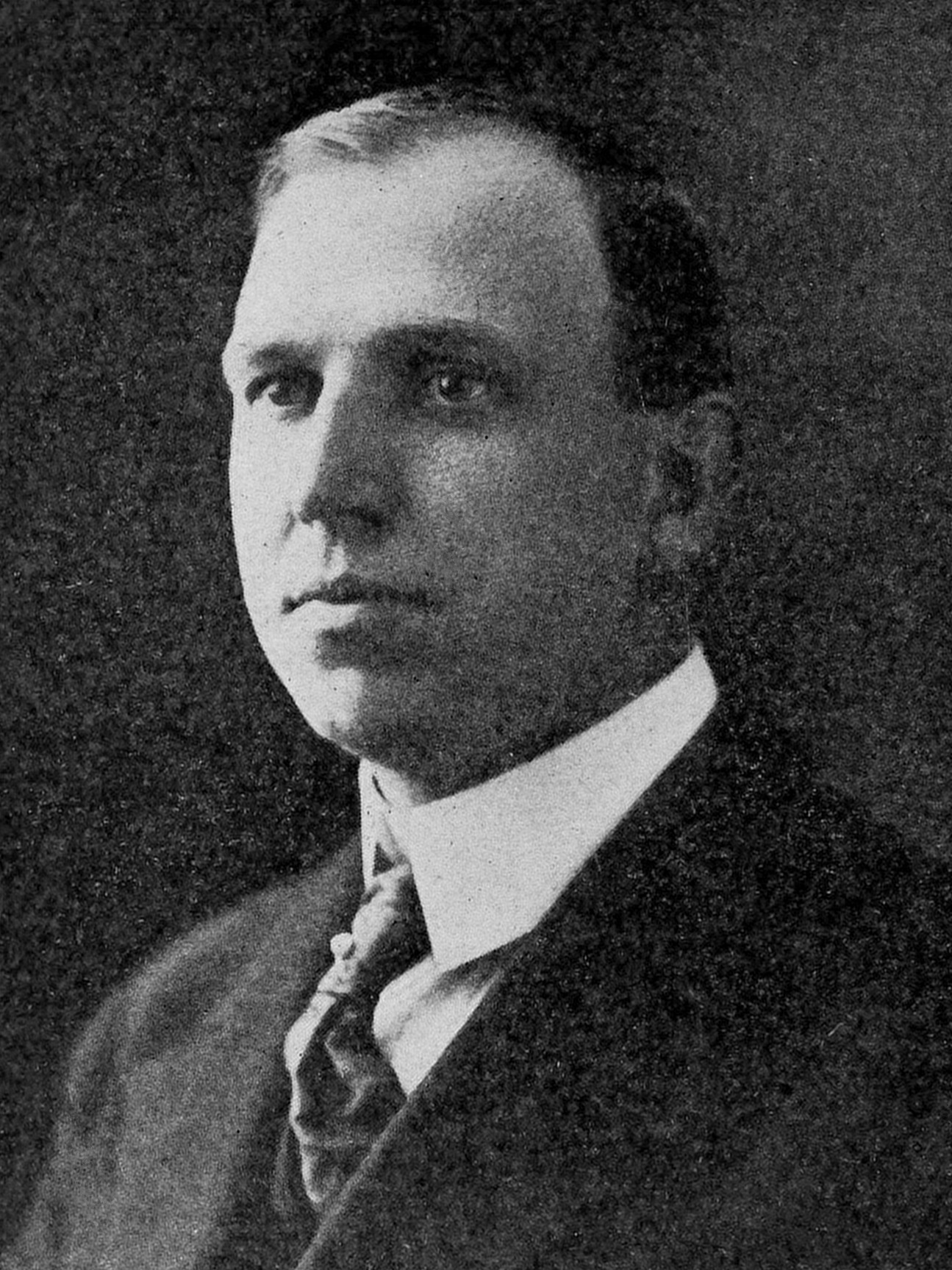

Judge of the United States District Court for the Northern District of Ohio
- In office December 17, 1928 – October 5, 1938
- Appointed by: Calvin Coolidge
- Preceded by: David C. Westenhaver
- Succeeded by: Robert Nugen Wilkin

Member of the Ohio Senate from the 13th district
- In office January 4, 1904 – January 3, 1909
- Preceded by: Warren G. Harding
- Succeeded by: Richard L. Cameron

Personal details
- Born: Samuel H. West; July 17, 1872 Waubeek, Iowa, U.S.
- Died: October 5, 1938 (aged 66)
- Party: Republican
- Relatives: William H. West
- Education: read law

Samuel Hardman West (July 17, 1872 – October 5, 1938) was a United States district judge of the United States District Court for the Northern District of Ohio.

== Education and career ==
Born in Waubeek, Linn County, Iowa, West moved to Bellefontaine, Ohio in 1891, and read law in the office of his uncle, William H. West. He entered the bar in 1893, and entered private practice in Bellefontaine starting in 1893. He served in the Company F, Second Regiment, Ohio Volunteer Infantry from May to September 1898 during the Spanish–American War and was a private. He was a prosecutor for Logan County, Ohio from 1899 to 1903, returning to private practice in Columbus, Ohio from 1907 to 1910. West served as a Republican in the Ohio Senate from 1904 to 1909.

== Federal judicial service ==
On December 10, 1928, West was nominated by President Calvin Coolidge to a seat on the United States District Court for the Northern District of Ohio vacated by Judge David C. Westenhaver. West was confirmed by the United States Senate on December 17, 1928, and received his commission the same day. West served in that capacity until his death on October 5, 1938.

== Sources ==
Legal offices
Preceded by David C. Westenhaver	Judge of the United States District Court for the Northern District of Ohio; 1928–1938	Succeeded by Robert Nugen Wilkin
