= Hampton, Nebraska =

- Village
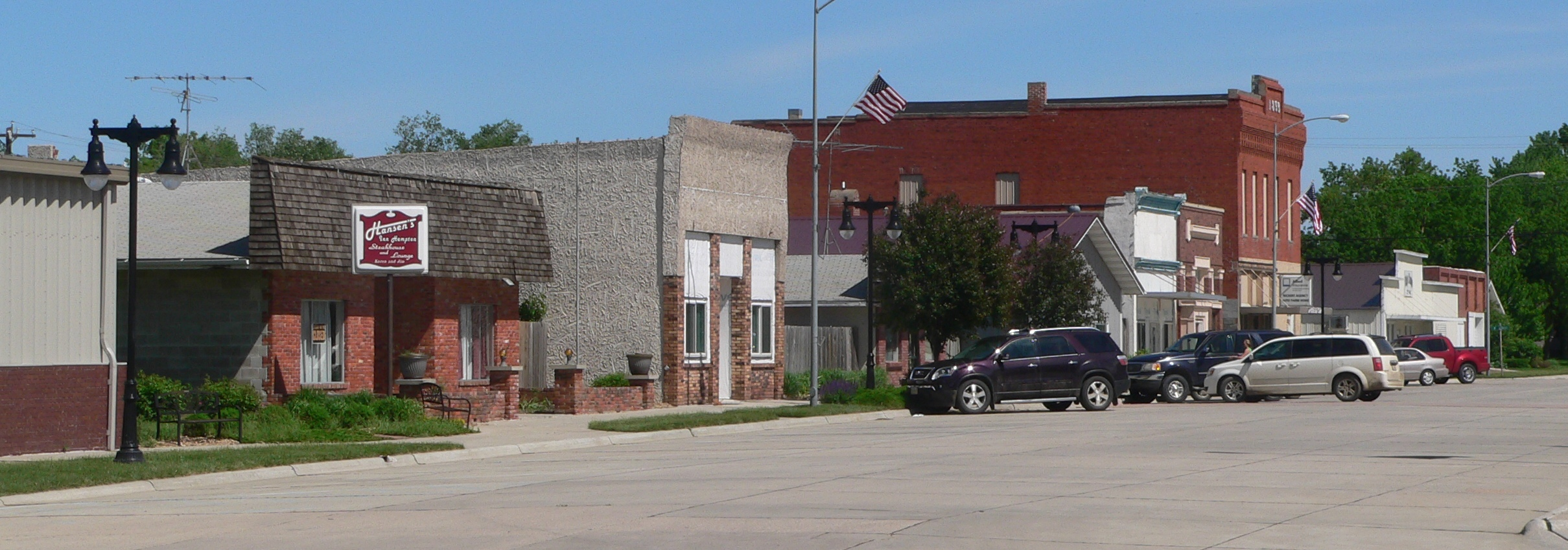
- Downtown Hampton: 3rd Street

- Location of Hampton, Nebraska
- Coordinates: 40°52′52″N 97°53′15″W
- Country: United States
- State: Nebraska
- County: Hamilton

Area
  - Total: 0.35 sq mi (0.90 km^{2})
  - Land: 0.35 sq mi (0.90 km^{2})
  - Water: 0 sq mi (0.00 km^{2})
- Elevation: 1,765 ft (538 m)

Population (2020)
  - Total: 432
  - Density: 1,248.8/sq mi (482.18/km^{2})
- Time zone: UTC-6 (Central (CST))
  - Summer (DST): UTC-5 (CDT)
- ZIP code: 68843
- Area code: 402
- FIPS code: 31-20785
- GNIS feature ID: 2398236
- Website: hamptonne.com

Hampton is a village in Hamilton County, in the state of Nebraska in the Midwestern United States. As of the 2020 census, Hampton had a population of 432.

== History ==
In 1879, Joshua Cox founded Hampton and circulated a petition for the railroad to be built through the town. On June 19, 1891, Cox and his brother James Cox became the first stockmen to ship cattle from the United States to Liverpool, England.

A teacher at a one-room schoolhouse in Hampton, Robert T. Meyer, was convicted of the crime of reading in the German language to 10-year-old Raymond Parpart, a fourth grader, in 1920. This led to the landmark US Supreme Court case Meyer v. Nebraska.

== Geography ==
According to the United States Census Bureau, the village has a total area of 0.35 square miles (0.91 km^{2}), all land.

== Demographics ==
Historical population
Census	Pop.	Note	%±
1890	430		—
1900	367		−14.7%
1910	383		4.4%
1920	457		19.3%
1930	369		−19.3%
1940	310		−16.0%
1950	289		−6.8%
1960	331		14.5%
1970	387		16.9%
1980	419		8.3%
1990	432		3.1%
2000	439		1.6%
2010	423		−3.6%
2020	432		2.1%
U.S. Decennial Census

=== 2010 census ===
As of the census of 2010, there were 423 people, 176 households, and 130 families living in the village. The population density was 1,208.6 inhabitants per square mile (466.6/km^{2}). There were 190 housing units at an average density of 542.9 per square mile (209.6/km^{2}). The racial makeup of the village was 97.4% White, 0.9% Asian, and 1.7% from two or more races. Hispanic or Latino of any race were 1.9% of the population.

There were 176 households, of which 26.7% had children under the age of 18 living with them, 63.6% were married couples living together, 5.7% had a female householder with no husband present, 4.5% had a male householder with no wife present, and 26.1% were non-families. 23.3% of all households were made up of individuals, and 11.4% had someone living alone who was 65 years of age or older. The average household size was 2.40 and the average family size was 2.82.

The median age in the village was 45.5 years. 22.7% of residents were under the age of 18; 7.3% were between the ages of 18 and 24; 19.1% were from 25 to 44; 32.6% were from 45 to 64; and 18.2% were 65 years of age or older. The gender makeup of the village was 50.6% male and 49.4% female.

=== 2000 census ===
As of the census of 2000, there were 439 people, 179 households, and 124 families living in the village. The population density was 1,342.6 inhabitants per square mile (518.4/km^{2}). There were 190 housing units at an average density of 581.1 per square mile (224.4/km^{2}). The racial makeup of the village was 98.41% White, 0.23% African American, 0.68% Native American, and 0.68% from two or more races. Hispanic or Latino of any race were 0.23% of the population.

There were 179 households, out of which 31.8% had children under the age of 18 living with them, 63.7% were married couples living together, 3.9% had a female householder with no husband present, and 30.7% were non-families. 26.8% of all households were made up of individuals, and 17.9% had someone living alone who was 65 years of age or older. The average household size was 2.45 and the average family size was 3.01.

In the village, the population was spread out, with 25.5% under the age of 18, 5.7% from 18 to 24, 27.8% from 25 to 44, 21.4% from 45 to 64, and 19.6% who were 65 years of age or older. The median age was 40 years. For every 100 females, there were 98.6 males. For every 100 females age 18 and over, there were 100.6 males.

As of 2000 the median income for a household in the village was $42,692, and the median income for a family was $46,563. Males had a median income of $28,500 versus $20,250 for females. The per capita income for the village was $18,458. About 1.5% of families and 2.1% of the population were below the poverty line, including 4.7% of those under age 18 and 2.3% of those age 65 or over.

== See also ==
- Meyer v. Nebraska
