= James C. Connell =

American judge

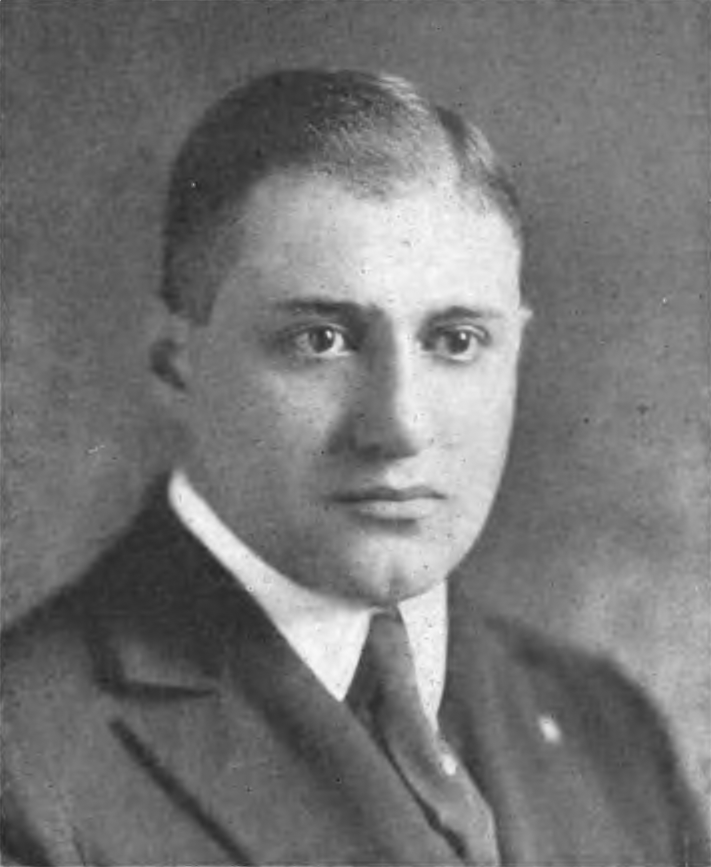
- circa 1921

Senior Judge of the United States District Court for the Northern District of Ohio
- In office September 21, 1971 – October 30, 1973

Chief Judge of the United States District Court for the Northern District of Ohio
- In office 1960–1967
- Preceded by: Charles Joseph McNamee
- Succeeded by: Girard Edward Kalbfleisch

Judge of the United States District Court for the Northern District of Ohio
- In office August 10, 1954 – September 21, 1971
- Appointed by: Dwight D. Eisenhower
- Preceded by: Seat established by 68 Stat. 8
- Succeeded by: Leroy John Contie Jr.

Personal details
- Born: James C. Connell; September 20, 1897 Cleveland, Ohio, U.S.
- Died: October 30, 1973 (aged 76)
- Education: Cleveland State University College of Law (LLB)

James C. Connell (September 20, 1897 – October 30, 1973) was a United States district judge of the United States District Court for the Northern District of Ohio.

== Education and career ==
Born in Cleveland, Ohio, Connell received a Bachelor of Laws from John Marshall School of Law (now Cleveland–Marshall College of Law) in Cleveland in 1918. He was in private practice of law in Cleveland from 1918 to 1922. He was an assistant police prosecutor for the City of Cleveland from 1922 to 1923 and was an assistant county prosecutor of Cuyahoga County, Ohio from 1923 to 1928. He was in private practice of law in Cleveland from 1928 to 1941. He was a judge to the Cuyahoga County Court of Common Pleas from 1941 to 1954.

== Federal judicial service ==
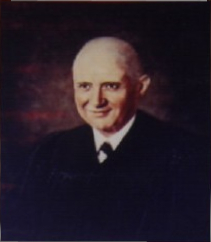
Judicial portrait of Connell, c. 1970.

President Dwight D. Eisenhower nominated Connell to the United States District Court for the Northern District of Ohio on June 24, 1954, to a new seat created by 68 Stat. 8. Confirmed by the Senate on August 10, 1954, and received his commission the same day. He served as Chief Judge from 1960 to 1967 and assumed senior status on September 21, 1971. He remained on the court until his death on October 30, 1973.

== Sources ==
Legal offices
Preceded by Seat established by 68 Stat. 8	Judge of the United States District Court for the Northern District of Ohio; 1954–1971	Succeeded by Leroy John Contie Jr.
Preceded by Charles Joseph McNamee	Chief Judge of the United States District Court for the Northern District of Ohio; 1960–1967	Succeeded by Girard Edward Kalbfleisch
