= Meyer v. Nebraska =

- Supreme Court of the United States

Argued February 23, 1923 Decided June 4, 1923
- Full case name: Robert T. Meyer v. State of Nebraska
- Citations: 262 U.S. 390 (more) 43 S. Ct. 625; 67 L. Ed. 1042; 1923 U.S. LEXIS 2655; 29 A.L.R. 1446

Case history
- Prior: Judgment for respondent, Meyer v. State, 107 Neb. 657, 187 N.W. 100 (1922).

Holding
- A 1919 Nebraska law prohibiting the teaching of modern foreign languages to grade-school children violated the Due Process Clause of the 14th Amendment.

Court membership
- Chief Justice William H. Taft Associate Justices Joseph McKenna · Oliver W. Holmes Jr. Willis Van Devanter · James C. McReynolds; Louis Brandeis · George Sutherland; Pierce Butler · Edward T. Sanford

Case opinions
- Majority: McReynolds, joined by Taft, McKenna, Van Devanter, Brandeis, Butler, Sanford
- Dissent: Holmes, joined by Sutherland

Laws applied
- U.S. Const. amend. XIV

Meyer v. Nebraska, 262 U.S. 390 (1923), is a landmark decision by the United States Supreme Court that held that the "Siman Act", a 1919 Nebraska law prohibiting minority languages as both the subject and medium of instruction in schools, violated the Due Process Clause of the Fourteenth Amendment to the United States Constitution. The Court's ruling is one of the earliest articulations of substantive due process.

The Siman Act had been passed after World War I as part of the English only movement and during a time of pervasive anti-German sentiment, atrocity propaganda, and spy scare paranoia promoted by U.S. news media. Nebraska was one of 22 states that had enacted laws banning or restricting foreign language instruction based on broader nativist sentiments to promote assimilation into American culture and society.

The Supreme Court, while recognizing that states have significant power to "make reasonable regulations for all schools", invalidated the Siman Act as an excessive "interference" of liberties granted by the Fourteenth Amendment, such as the right of a teacher to instruct students and the right of parents to control the upbringing of their children. The Court also noted that such rights extend broadly to all Americans, including those who speak foreign languages.

Meyer has been described by legal scholars as "the case that defined personal liberties" and "America's First Privacy Case", since it greatly expanded the scope of constitutionally protected liberties to include both enumerated and unenumerated "fundamental rights" such as the right "to contract, to engage in any of the common occupations of life, to acquire useful knowledge, [and] to marry, establish a home and bring up children...". This subsequently developed into the legal principle of substantive due process that would underpin decisions related to same-sex marriage, racial discrimination, and reproductive rights.

== Background ==
World War I witnessed an extensive campaign against all things German, such as the performance of German music at symphony concerts and the meetings of German American civic associations. Language was a principal focus of legislation at the state and local level. It took many forms, from requiring associations to have charters written in English to a ban on the use of German within the town limits. Some states banned foreign language instruction, while a few banned only German. Some extended their bans into private instruction and even to religious education. A bill to create a Department of Education at the federal level was introduced in October 1918, designed to restrict federal funds to states that enforced English-only education. An internal battle over conducting services and religious instruction in German divided the Lutheran churches.

On April 9, 1919, Nebraska enacted a statute called "An act relating to the teaching of foreign languages in the state of Nebraska", commonly known as the Siman Act. It imposed restrictions on both the use of a foreign language as a medium of instruction and on foreign languages as a subject of study. With respect to the use of a foreign language while teaching, it provided that "No person, individually or as a teacher, shall, in any private, denominational, parochial or public school, teach any subject to any person in any language other than the English language." With respect to foreign-language education, it prohibited instruction of children who had yet to successfully complete the eighth grade.

== Facts and arguments ==
On May 25, 1920, Robert T. Meyer, while an instructor in Zion Lutheran School, a one-room schoolhouse in Hampton, Nebraska, taught the subject of reading in the German language to 10-year-old Raymond Parpart, a fourth grader. The Hamilton County Attorney entered the classroom and discovered Parpart reading from the Bible in German. He charged Meyer with violating the Siman Act.

Meyer was tried and convicted in the district court for Hamilton County and fined $25 (about $400 in 2025 dollars). In 1923, the Nebraska Supreme Court affirmed his conviction by a vote of 4 to 2. The majority thought the law a proper response to "the baneful effects" of allowing immigrants to educate their children in their mother tongue, with results "inimical to our own safety". The dissent called the Siman Act the work of "crowd psychology".

Meyer appealed to the Supreme Court of the United States. His lead attorney was Arthur Mullen, an Irish-Catholic and a prominent Democrat who had earlier failed in his attempt to obtain an injunction against enforcement of the Siman Act from the Nebraska State Supreme Court. Oral arguments expressed conflicting interpretations of the World War I experience. Mullen attributed the law to "hatred, national bigotry and racial prejudice engendered by the World War". Opposing counsel countered that "it is the ambition of the State to have its entire population 100 percent American".

== Supreme Court ==
=== Majority opinion ===
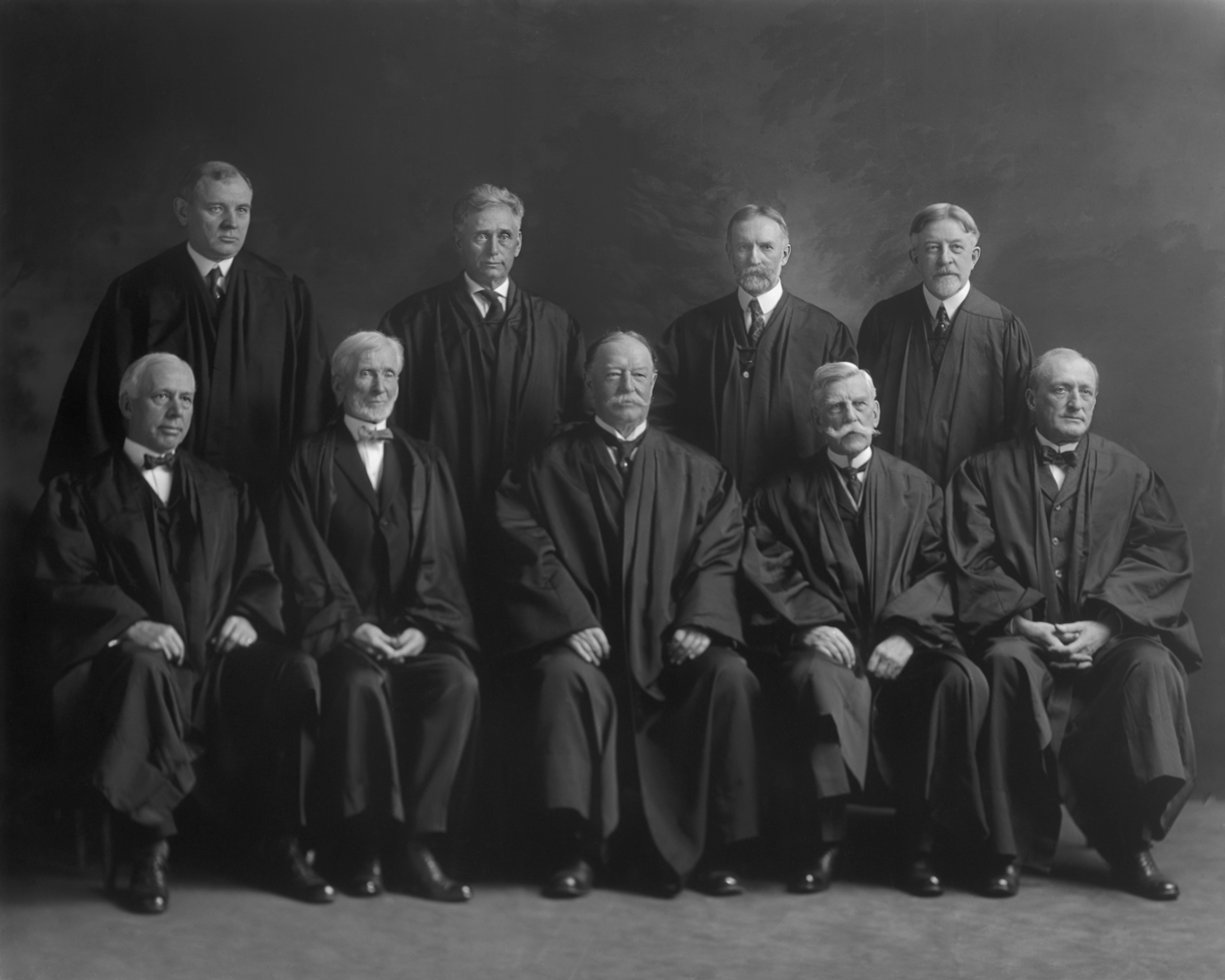
The Taft Court

The Supreme Court reversed seven to two, reasoning that although the Fourteenth Amendment’s Due Process Clause ostensibly mandates only that the government follow certain procedures before depriving individuals of life, liberty or property (such as a jury trial in criminal cases), the concept of "liberty thus guaranteed" is broader and includes certain spheres of life in which the government cannot intrude even if it properly applies such procedures.

Writing for the majority, Justice McReynolds stated that while it was not necessary "to define with exactness" the liberties that were protected by the Due Process Clause, its protections include "[w]ithout doubt...not merely freedom from bodily restraint but also the right of the individual to contract, to engage in any of the common occupations of life, to acquire useful knowledge, to marry, establish a home and bring up children, to worship God according to the dictates of his own conscience, and generally to enjoy those privileges long recognized at common law as essential to the orderly pursuit of happiness by free men".

Analyzing in that context the liberty of the teacher and of parents with respect to their children, McReynolds wrote:

"Practically, education of the young is only possible in schools conducted by especially qualified persons who devote themselves thereto. The calling always has been regarded as useful and honorable, essential, indeed, to the public welfare. Mere knowledge of the German language cannot reasonably be regarded as harmful. Heretofore it has been commonly looked upon as helpful and desirable. Plaintiff in error taught this language in school as part of his occupation. His right thus to teach and the right of parents to engage him so to instruct their children, we think, are within the liberty of the amendment."

And further: "Evidently the Legislature has attempted materially to interfere with the calling of modern language teachers, with the opportunities of pupils to acquire knowledge, and with the power of parents to control the education of their own."

And finally: "That the state may do much, go very far, indeed, in order to improve the quality of its citizens, physically, mentally and morally, is clear; but the individual has certain fundamental rights which must be respected. The protection of the Constitution extends to all, to those who speak other languages as well as to those born with English on the tongue. Perhaps it would be highly advantageous if all had ready understanding of our ordinary speech, but this cannot be coerced by methods which conflict with the Constitution – a desirable end cannot be promoted by prohibited means."

He allowed that wartime circumstances might justify a different understanding, but that Nebraska had not demonstrated sufficient need "in time of peace and domestic tranquility" to justify "the consequent infringement of rights long freely enjoyed".

=== Dissent ===
Justices Oliver Wendell Holmes and George Sutherland dissented. Their dissenting opinion, written by Holmes, is found in the companion case of Bartels v. State of Iowa. Holmes wrote that he differed with the majority "with hesitation and unwillingness" because he thought the law did not impose an undue restriction on the liberty of the teacher since it was not arbitrary, was limited in its application to the teaching of children, and the State had areas where many children might hear only a language other than English spoken at home. "I think I appreciate the objection to the law, but it appears to me to present a question upon which men reasonably might differ and therefore I am unable to say the Constitution of the United States prevents the experiment being tried."

== Aftermath ==
The most immediate significance of Meyer was in derailing the powerful nationwide movement, motivated largely by anti-Catholicism, to destroy parochial education by requiring all children to attend public schools. Oregon voters approved one such compulsory public education law in a referendum seven months before Meyer, and similar measures. The Court unanimously struck down the Oregon law in Pierce v. Society of Sisters (1925), which was based largely upon Meyer. Pierce even more forcefully emphasized parental rights: "The child is not the mere creature of the State; those who nurture him and direct his destiny have the right, coupled with the high duty, to recognize and prepare him for additional obligations."

Two years later, the Court reaffirmed the holdings of Meyer and Pierce in Farrington v. Tokushige (1927), which invalidated a Hawaiian statute restricting the teaching of Asian languages. The Court rejected the Hawaiian territory's attempt to distinguish Meyer on the basis that Asian languages were more pernicious than German.

== Influence on later jurisprudence ==
Meyer, along with Pierce, is often cited as one of the first instances in which the U.S. Supreme Court engaged in substantive due process in the area of civil liberties. Laurence Tribe has called them "the two sturdiest pillars of the substantive due process temple". He noted that the decisions in these cases did not describe specific acts as constitutionally protected but a broader area of liberty: "[they] described what they were protecting from the standardizing hand of the state in language that spoke of the family as a center of value-formation and value-transmission ... the authority of parents to make basic choices" and not just controlling the subjects one's child is taught. The doctrine of substantive due process provided the basis for future civil rights decisions of the Court, including Roe v. Wade, Planned Parenthood v. Casey, and Lawrence v. Texas.

Justice Kennedy speculated in 2000 that both of those cases might have been written differently nowadays: "Pierce and Meyer, had they been decided in recent times, may well have been grounded upon First Amendment principles protecting freedom of speech, belief, and religion."

== See also ==
- List of United States Supreme Court cases, volume 262
