= David C. Westenhaver =

American judge (1865–1928)

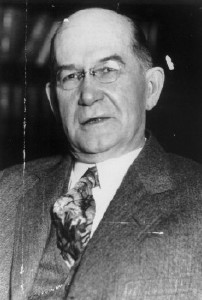

Judge of the United States District Court for the Northern District of Ohio
- In office March 14, 1917 – July 29, 1928
- Appointed by: Woodrow Wilson
- Preceded by: John Hessin Clarke
- Succeeded by: Samuel H. West

Personal details
- Born: David Courtney Westenhaver; January 13, 1865 Berkeley County, West Virginia, U.S.
- Died: July 29, 1928 (aged 63)
- Party: Democratic
- Education: Georgetown Law (LL.B.)

David Courtney Westenhaver (January 13, 1865 – July 29, 1928) was a United States district judge of the United States District Court for the Northern District of Ohio.

== Education and career ==
Born in Berkeley County, West Virginia, Westenhaver received a Bachelor of Laws from Georgetown Law in 1886. He was in private practice in Martinsburg, West Virginia from 1886 to 1903, serving as a prosecuting attorney of Berkeley County from 1886 to 1887, and as a member of the Martinsburg City Council from 1902 to 1903. He then moved his practice to Cleveland, Ohio from 1903 to 1917, and was a member of the Board of Education of Cleveland from 1912 to 1915.

== Federal judicial service ==
Westenhaver was nominated by President Woodrow Wilson on March 12, 1917, to a seat on the United States District Court for the Northern District of Ohio vacated by Judge John Hessin Clarke. He was confirmed by the United States Senate on March 14, 1917, and received his commission the same day. His service terminated on July 29, 1928, due to his death.

=== Notable cases ===
Westenhaver was the presiding judge in the sedition trial of Eugene V. Debs in 1918, and handed down the sentence of ten years imprisonment that was ultimately commuted by President Warren Harding.

In 1924, in Euclid v. Ambler, Westenhaver ruled in favor of a business interest represented by his former partner Newton Baker in holding the zoning ordinance of Euclid, Ohio unconstitutional. The United States Supreme Court overturned Westenhaver's decision in 1926, in a landmark ruling that established the constitutionality of zoning laws.

== Family ==
Westenhaver was married June 1888, at Martinsburg to Mary C. Paull. They had one son. He was a Democrat in politics.

== Sources ==
Legal offices
Preceded by John Hessin Clarke	Judge of the United States District Court for the Northern District of Ohio; 1917–1928	Succeeded by Samuel H. West
