= Robert Nugen Wilkin =

American judge

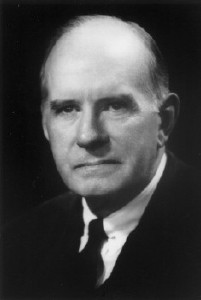

Senior Judge of the United States District Court for the Northern District of Ohio
- In office August 31, 1949 – February 23, 1973

Judge of the United States District Court for the Northern District of Ohio
- In office June 3, 1939 – August 31, 1949
- Appointed by: Franklin D. Roosevelt
- Preceded by: Samuel H. West
- Succeeded by: Charles Joseph McNamee

Associate Justice of the Ohio Supreme Court
- In office April 10, 1934 – November 1934
- Appointed by: George White
- Preceded by: Florence E. Allen
- Succeeded by: William L. Hart

Personal details
- Born: Robert Nugen Wilkin; May 4, 1886 New Philadelphia, Ohio, U.S.
- Died: February 23, 1973 (aged 86) Cleveland, Ohio, U.S.
- Resting place: Maple Grove Cemetery; New Philadelphia, Ohio
- Education: University of Virginia (LLB)

Robert Nugen Wilkin (May 4, 1886 – February 23, 1973) was a United States district judge of the United States District Court for the Northern District of Ohio.

== Early life and education ==
Born in New Philadelphia, Ohio, Wilkin received a Bachelor of Laws from the University of Virginia School of Law in 1908.

== Career ==
He was in private practice in New Philadelphia from 1908 with his brother, David R., and his father, J. Foster Wilkin, under the name Wilkin and Wilkin. In 1912, his brother moved to Cleveland, Ohio, and his father was elected to the Ohio Supreme Court, and he continued the firm as Wilkin and Fernsell He was a member of the Judicial Council of Ohio from 1932 to 1933. He was a justice of the Supreme Court of Ohio in 1934. He was counsel to the Muskingum Watershed Conservancy District in Ohio from 1935 to 1939.

=== Federal judicial service ===
On May 19, 1939, Wilkin was nominated by President Franklin D. Roosevelt to a seat on the United States District Court for the Northern District of Ohio vacated by Judge Samuel H. West. Wilkin was confirmed by the United States Senate on June 1, 1939, and received his commission on June 3, 1939. He assumed senior status due to a certified disability on August 31, 1949, serving in that capacity until his death on February 23, 1973. He died in Cleveland, and was buried at the Wilkin family mausoleum at Maple Grove Cemetery in New Philadelphia.

== Personal life ==
Wilkin was a Mason, an Elks Lodge member, Delta Kappa Epsilon, Phi Delta Phi, and a Presbyterian Church member. In 1911, he married Norma Fertig of Dover, Ohio, and their only child, a daughter born in 1912, died in 1918.

== Sources ==
Legal offices
Preceded by Samuel H. West	Judge of the United States District Court for the Northern District of Ohio; 1939–1949	Succeeded by Charles Joseph McNamee
