= James Clark McReynolds =

US Supreme Court justice from 1914 to 1941

James McReynolds
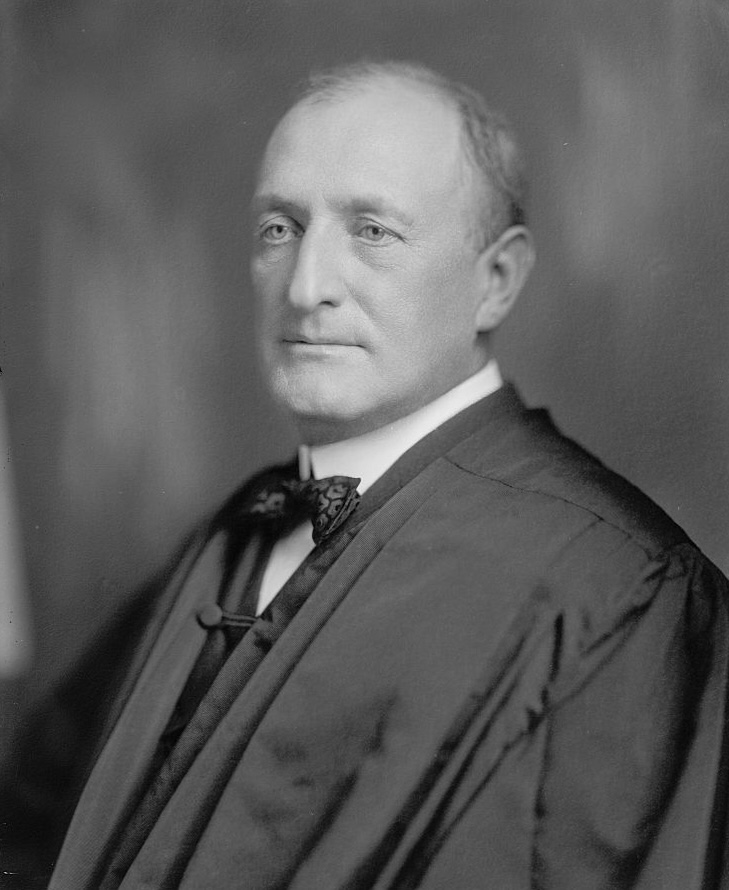
- Portrait by Harris & Ewing

Associate Justice of the Supreme Court of the United States
- In office October 12, 1914 – January 31, 1941
- Nominated by: Woodrow Wilson
- Preceded by: Horace Harmon Lurton
- Succeeded by: James F. Byrnes

48th United States Attorney General
- In office March 15, 1913 – August 29, 1914
- President: Woodrow Wilson
- Preceded by: George Wickersham
- Succeeded by: Thomas Gregory

10th United States Assistant Attorney General
- In office May 2, 1903 – March 24, 1907
- President: Theodore Roosevelt
- Preceded by: James M. Beck
- Succeeded by: Edward Terry Sanford

Personal details
- Born: James Clark McReynolds; February 3, 1862 Elkton, Kentucky, U.S.
- Died: August 24, 1946 (aged 84) Washington, D.C., U.S.
- Party: Democratic
- Education: Vanderbilt University (BS); University of Virginia (LLB)

James Clark McReynolds (February 3, 1862 – August 24, 1946) was an American lawyer and judge from Tennessee who served as United States Attorney General under President Woodrow Wilson and as an associate justice of the Supreme Court of the United States. He served on the Court from 1914 to his retirement in 1941. McReynolds is best known today for his sustained opposition to the domestic programs of President Franklin D. Roosevelt and for his abrasive and dislikeable personality, which his contemporaries mostly viewed negatively and included documented elements of overt antisemitism and racism.

Born in Elkton, Kentucky, McReynolds practiced law in Tennessee after graduating from the University of Virginia School of Law. He served as the U.S. Assistant Attorney General during President Theodore Roosevelt's administration and became well known for his skill in antitrust cases. After Wilson took office in 1913, he appointed McReynolds as his administration's first attorney general. Wilson nominated McReynolds to the Supreme Court in 1914 to fill the vacancy caused by Associate Justice Horace Harmon Lurton's death.

In his 26 years on the bench, McReynolds wrote 506 majority opinions for the Court and 157 dissents, 93 of which were against the New Deal. He was part of the "Four Horsemen" bloc of conservative justices who frequently voted to strike down New Deal programs. He assumed senior status in 1941 and was succeeded by James F. Byrnes. During his Supreme Court tenure, McReynolds wrote the majority opinion in cases such as Meyer v. Nebraska, United States v. Miller, Adams v. Tanner, and Pierce v. Society of Sisters. Due to his temperament, bigotry, and his opposition to the domestic programs of the FDR administration, McReynolds is sometimes included on lists of the worst Supreme Court justices by progressive-leaning thinkers.

== Early life ==
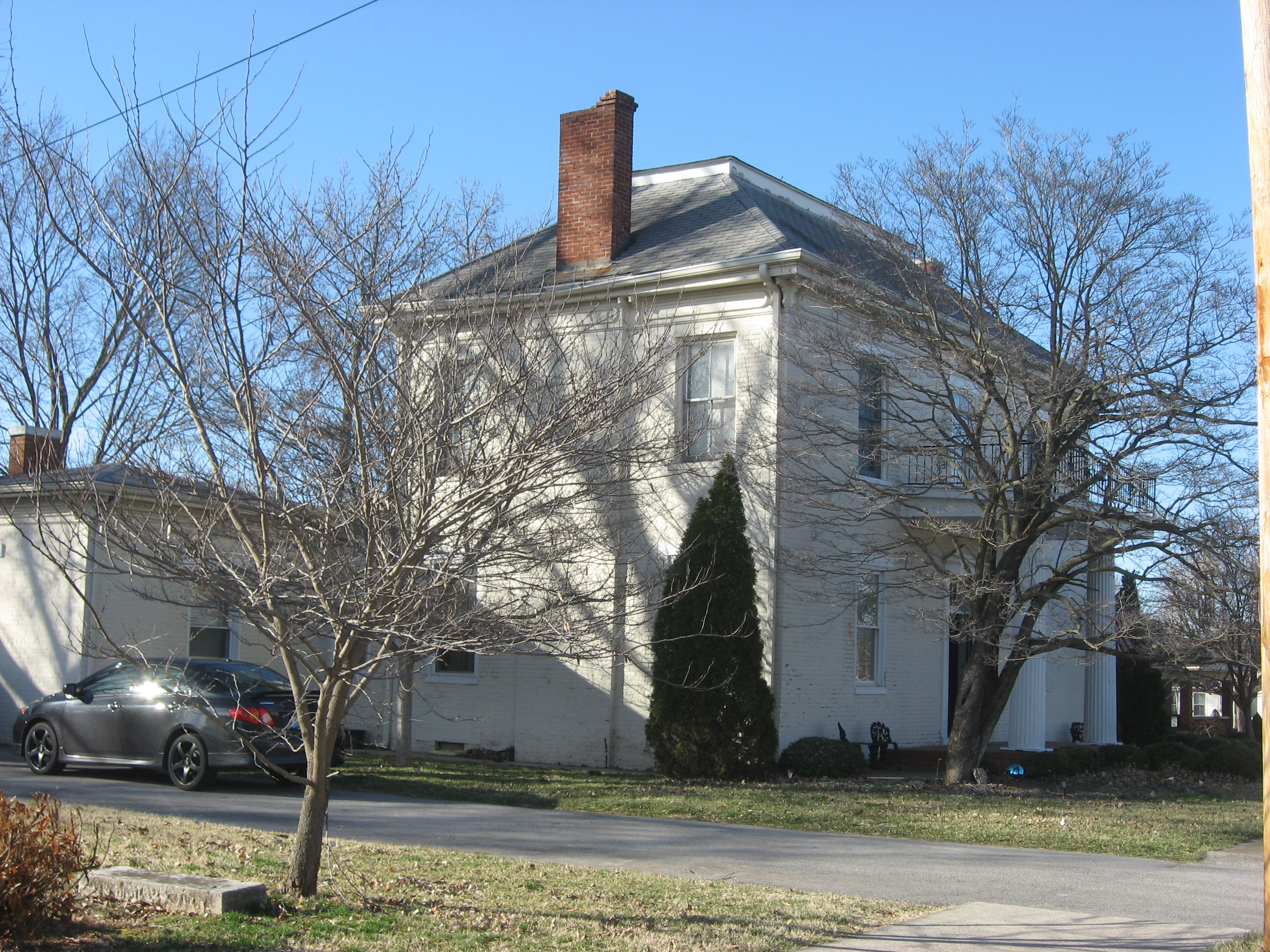
McReynolds's birthplace in Elkton

Born in Elkton, Kentucky, the county seat of Todd County, McReynolds was the son of John Oliver and Ellen (née Reeves) McReynolds, both members of the Disciples of Christ church. John Oliver McReynolds was active in business ventures and served as a surgeon in the Confederate army during the Civil War. The house where James Clark McReynolds was born still stands; (Note: One block from the Todd County courthouse, it is listed on the National Register of Historic Places Inventory.) it was listed on the National Register of Historic Places in 1976. He graduated from the prestigious Green River Academy and later matriculated at Vanderbilt University, graduating with status one year later as a valedictorian in 1882. At the University of Virginia School of Law, where he studied under John B. Minor, "a man of stern morality and firm conservative convictions", McReynolds completed his studies in 14 months. He again graduated at the head of his class, receiving his law degree in 1884.

McReynolds was secretary to U.S. Senator Howell E. Jackson, who became an associate justice of the Supreme Court in 1893. He practiced law in Nashville and served for three years as an adjunct professor of commercial law, insurance, and corporations at Vanderbilt University Law School.

McReynolds became active in politics, running unsuccessfully for Congress in 1896 as a "Goldbug" Democrat. (Note: See free silver.) As head of the Tennessee delegation to the 1896 Democratic National Convention, he wrote the party's "sound money" plank. Under Theodore Roosevelt, McReynolds served as Assistant Attorney General from 1903 to 1907, when he resigned to take up private practice with the law firm of Guthrie, Cravath, and Henderson (later renamed Cravath, Swaine & Moore) in New York City.

== Attorney General ==
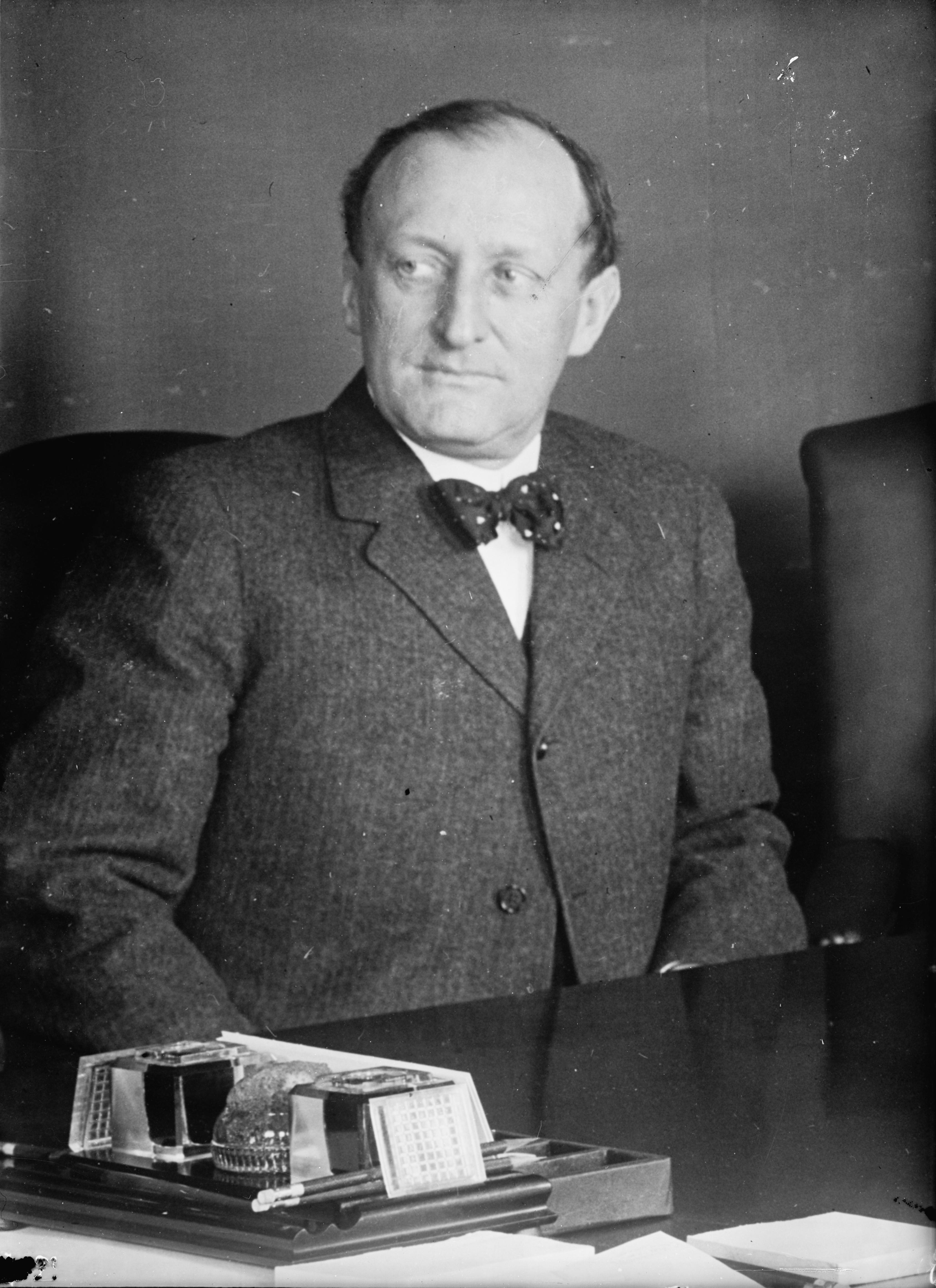
Attorney General McReynolds (c. 1913)

While in private practice, McReynolds was retained by the government in matters relating to enforcement of antitrust laws. He litigated against the "tobacco trust" in United States v. American Tobacco Co. and against a monopoly over anthracite coal in United States v. Reading Co. In recognition of his "trust busting" credentials, Wilson appointed McReynolds as the 48th United States Attorney General on March 15, 1913, and he served until his accession to the Supreme Court in August 1914. His abrasive personality was understood to be a factor in his short tenure.

== Supreme Court ==
On August 19, 1914, Wilson nominated McReynolds as an associate justice of the United States Supreme Court, to succeed Horace H. Lurton. The United States Senate confirmed him on August 29, by a 44–6 vote, and he was sworn into office on October 12.

When the Supreme Court Building opened in 1935 during the Great Depression, McReynolds, like most of the other justices, refused to move his office into the new building. He continued to work out of the office he maintained in his apartment. He said that, with the country in economic turmoil, the government should not have spent so much money on a single building.

=== Important opinions ===
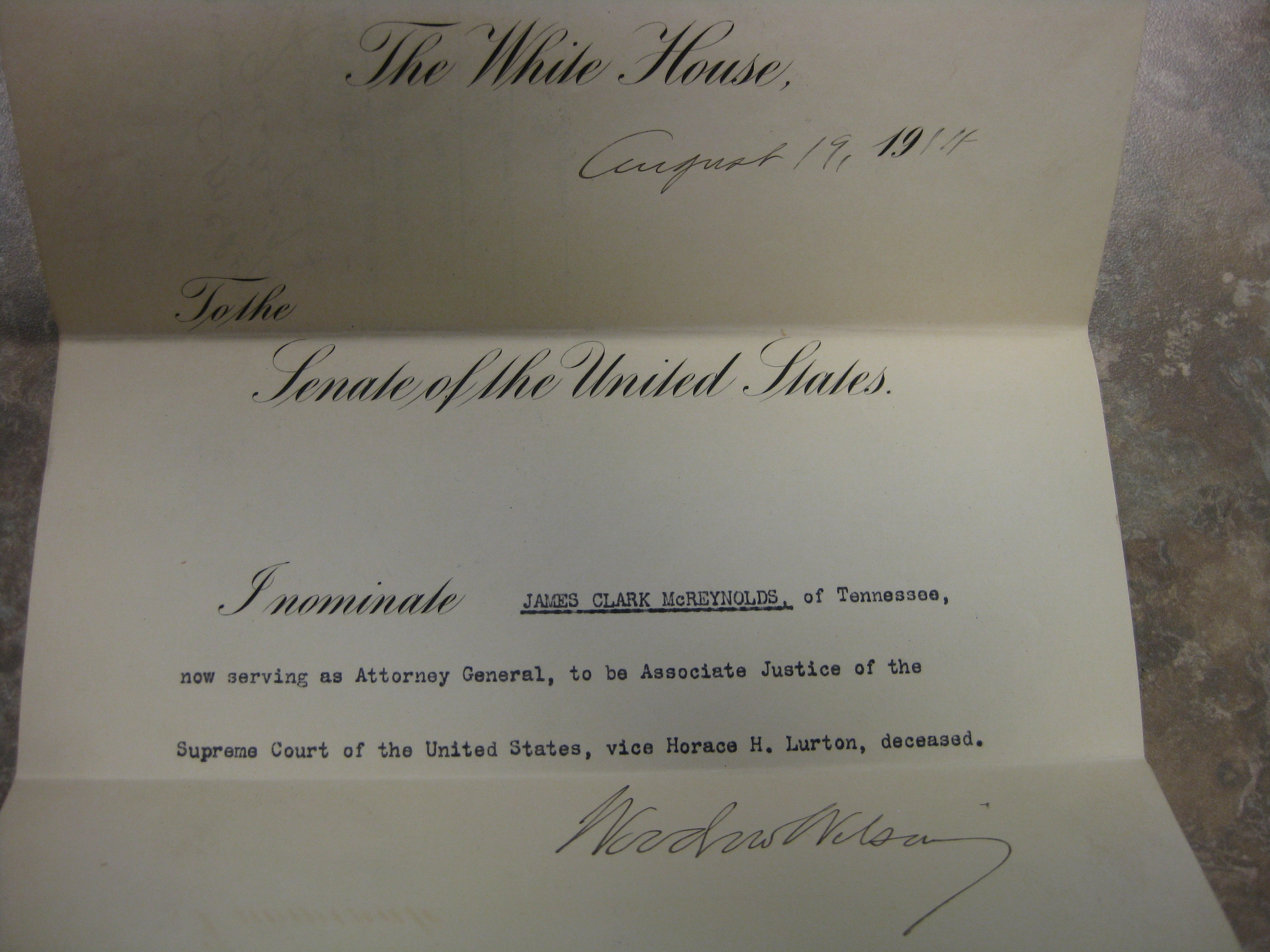
McReynolds's Supreme Court nomination

In his 27 years on the bench, McReynolds wrote 506 decisions, an average of just under 19 opinions for each term of the Court during his tenure. In addition, he authored 157 dissents, 93 of which were against the New Deal.

McReynolds's fierce opposition to Franklin Roosevelt's New Deal legislation designed to provide relief to citizens and put people to work, but which greatly expanded the scope of the federal government during the Great Depression, resulted in his being classified as one of the "Four Horsemen", along with George Sutherland, Willis Van Devanter and Pierce Butler. McReynolds voted to strike down the Tennessee Valley Authority in Ashwander v. TVA, the National Industrial Recovery Act in Schechter Poultry Corp. v. United States, the Agricultural Adjustment Act of 1933 in United States v. Butler, the Bituminous Coal Conservation Act of 1935 in Carter v. Carter Coal Co., and the Social Security Act, 42 U.S.C. § 301 et seq., in Steward Machine Co. v. Davis, 301 U.S. 548 (1937). He continued to vote against New Deal measures after most of the Court shifted in 1937 to upholding New Deal legislation. Howard Ball called McReynolds "the most strident Court critic of Roosevelt's New Deal programs".

As a confirmed opponent of federal authority aimed toward social ends or economic regulation, McReynolds had the "single-minded passion of a zealot". He was a "firm believer in laissez-faire economic theory", which he said was constitutionally enshrined. After the "Lochner era" ended in 1937—the Court's "switch in time that saved nine"—McReynolds became a dissenter. Unchanging through his 1941 retirement, his dissents continued to decry the federal government's exercises of power. In Steward Machine Co. v. Davis, 301 U.S. 548 (1937), he dissented from a decision upholding the Social Security Act. He wrote: "I can not find any authority in the Constitution for making the Federal Government the great almoner of public charity throughout the United States".

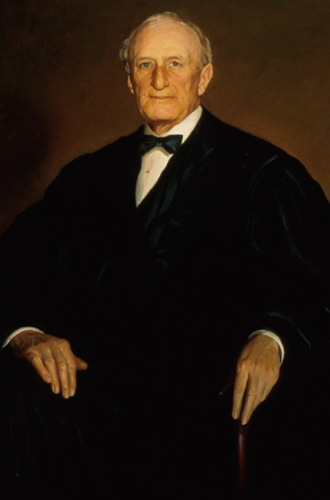
Supreme Court's official portrait of James Clark McReynolds, ca 1941

McReynolds wrote two early decisions using the Fourteenth Amendment to protect civil liberties: Meyer v. Nebraska, 262 U.S. 390 (1923), and Pierce v. Society of Sisters, 268 U.S. 510 (1925). Meyer involved a state law that restricted the teaching of modern foreign languages in schools. Meyer, who taught German in a Lutheran school, was convicted under this law. In overturning the conviction on substantive due process grounds, McReynolds wrote that the liberty guaranteed by the Due Process Clause of the Fourteenth Amendment included an individual's right "to contract, to engage in any of the common occupations of life, to acquire useful knowledge, to marry, to establish a home and bring up children, to worship God according to the dictates of his conscience, and generally to enjoy privileges, essential to the orderly pursuit of happiness by free men". These two decisions survived the post-Lochner era.

Pierce involved a challenge to a law forbidding parents to send their children to any but public schools. McReynolds wrote the opinion for a unanimous Court, holding that the Act violated the liberty of parents to direct the education of their children: "the fundamental liberty upon which all governments in this Union repose excludes any general power of the State to standardize its children by forcing them to accept instruction from public teachers only". These decisions were revived long after McReynolds left the bench, to buttress the Court's announcement of a constitutional right to privacy in Griswold v. Connecticut, 381 U.S. 479 (1965), and later the constitutional right to abortion in Roe v. Wade, 410 U.S. 113 (1973).

McReynolds wrote the decision in United States v. Miller, 307 U.S. 174 (1939), the only Supreme Court case directly involving the Second Amendment until District of Columbia v. Heller in 2008. In the field of tax law, he wrote for the Court in Burnet v. Logan, 283 U.S. 404 (1931), a significant decision setting out the Court's doctrine regarding "open transactions."

He also wrote the dissent in the Gold Clause Cases, which required the surrender of all gold coins, gold bullion, and gold certificates to the government by May 1, 1933, under Executive Order 6102, issued by President Franklin Roosevelt.

== Personality and conflicts ==
McReynolds was labeled "Scrooge" by journalist Drew Pearson. (Note: This is the title of the chapter dedicated to McReynolds in Pearson & Allen (1936).) Chief Justice William Howard Taft thought him selfish, prejudiced and mean: "[H]e has a continual grouch, and is always offended because the court is doing something that he regards as undignified." Taft also wrote that McReynolds was the most irresponsible member of the Court, and that "[i]n the absence of McReynolds everything went smoothly."

Early on, his temperament affected his performance in the court. For example, he determined that John Clarke, another Wilson appointee, was too liberal and refused to speak with him. Clarke decided to resign early from the court, and said that McReynolds's open antipathy was a factor. McReynolds refused to sign the customary joint memorial letter for Clarke, which was always given to departing members. In a letter, Taft commented that "[t]his is a fair sample of McReynolds's personal character and the difficulty of getting along with him."

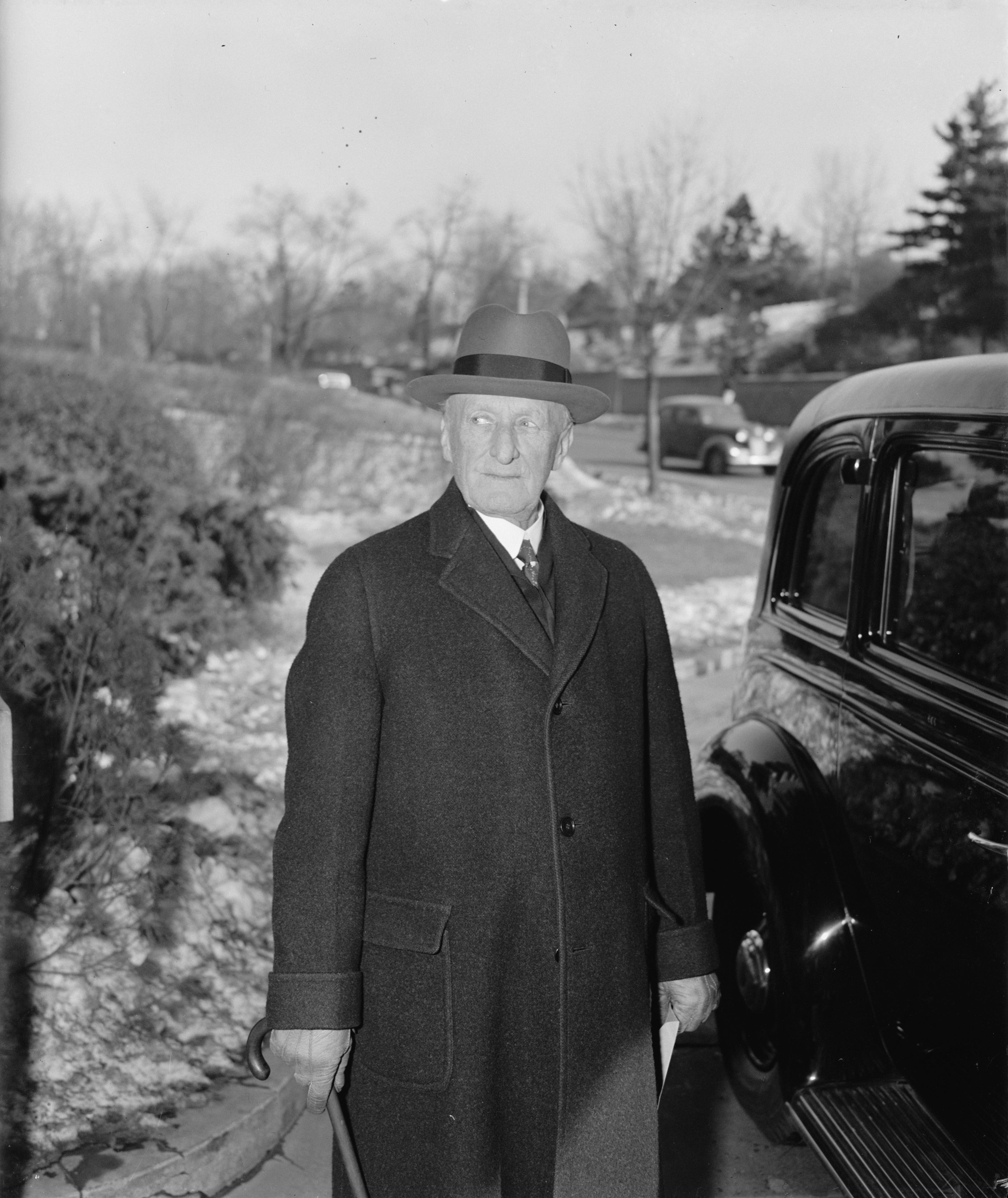
Justice McReynolds, February 3, 1940

Taft wrote that although he considered McReynolds an "able man", he found him to be "selfish to the last degree ... fuller of prejudice than any man I have ever known ... one who delights in making others uncomfortable. He has no sense of duty ... really seems to have less of a loyal spirit to the Court than anybody." In 1929, McReynolds asked Taft to announce opinions assigned to him (McReynolds), explaining that "an imperious voice has called me out of town. I don't think my sudden illness will prove fatal, but strange things some time [sic] happen around Thanksgiving." Duck hunting season had opened and McReynolds was off to Maryland for some shooting. In 1925, he left so suddenly on a similar errand that he had no opportunity to notify the Chief Justice of his departure. Taft was infuriated as two important decisions he wanted to deliver were delayed, because McReynolds had not handed in a dissent before leaving.

McReynolds went on tirades about "un-Americans" and "political subversives." Known as a blatant bigot, (Note: "[McReynolds] was a headache ... He would not speak to Brandeis, was clearly anti-Semitic, and was a disruptive force.") he would not accept "Jews, drinkers, blacks, women, smokers, married or engaged individuals" as law clerks. Time "called him 'Puritanical', 'intolerably rude', 'savagely sarcastic', 'incredibly reactionary', and 'anti-Semitic'". McReynolds refused to speak to Louis Brandeis, the first Jewish member of the Court, for the first three years of Brandeis's tenure. When Brandeis retired in 1939, McReynolds again did not sign the dedicatory letter. He habitually left the conference room whenever Brandeis spoke.

When Benjamin Cardozo's appointment was being pressed on President Herbert C. Hoover, McReynolds joined Justices Pierce Butler and Willis Van Devanter in urging the White House not to "afflict the Court with another Jew". When news of Cardozo's appointment was announced, McReynolds is claimed to have said "Huh, it seems that the only way you can get on the Supreme Court these days is to be either the son of a criminal or a Jew, or both." During Cardozo's swearing-in ceremony, McReynolds pointedly read a newspaper. He often held a brief or record in front of his face when Cardozo delivered an opinion from the bench. Likewise, he refused to sign opinions authored by Brandeis.

According to John Frush Knox, McReynolds's law clerk for the 1936–37 term (following the seven-year clerkship of Maurice Mahoney), and one author of a memoir of McReynolds's service, McReynolds never spoke to Cardozo at all, and several sources report that he did not attend Cardozo's memorial ceremonies held at the Supreme Court. (On the other hand, the report that he did not attend Felix Frankfurter's swearing-in—with regard to which he is reported to have exclaimed, "My God, another Jew on the Court!"—was refuted by Supreme Court historian Franz Jantzen, as cited by T. C. Peppers in the Richmond Public Interest Law Review.)

In 1922, Taft proposed that members of the Court accompany him to Philadelphia on a ceremonial occasion, but McReynolds refused, writing: "As you know, I am not always to be found when there is a Hebrew abroad. Therefore, my 'inability' to attend must not surprise you." However, the oft-repeated story that McReynolds refused to sit for the 1924 Court photograph because of his hostility to Brandeis is untrue. McReynolds objected to taking a new photograph when there had been no change in the membership of the court since the 1923 photograph. Alpheus T. Mason misinterpreted this as hostility to Brandeis, but McReynolds sat for numerous photographs for which Brandeis (and later Felix Frankfurter) was present.

Once, when colleague Harlan Fiske Stone remarked to him of an attorney's brief: "That was the dullest argument I ever heard in my life", McReynolds replied: "The only duller thing I can think of is to hear you read one of your opinions."

McReynolds's rudeness was not confined to colleagues on the Court, or Jews. When Charles Hamilton Houston, one of the foremost African American lawyers of his day, appeared before the Court to argue in favor of desegregating the University of Missouri Law School in Gaines v. Canada (1938), McReynolds turned his chair backward so he could not see Hamilton. McReynolds's long-suffering African-American domestic servants—subject to his racism—gave him the nickname "Pussywillow".

As a Justice, McReynolds held privileges at the Chevy Chase golf club. Justices Pierce Butler and Willis Van Devanter transferred from the club to Burning Tree because McReynolds "got disagreeable even beyond their endurance". Once when called before the chairman of the Golf Committee to answer complaints filed against him, McReynolds said, "I've been a member of this club a good many years, and no one around here has ever shown me any courtesy, so I don't intend to show any to anyone else." The indignant chairman replied: "Mr. Justice, you wouldn't be a member of this club if it wasn't for your official position. The members of this club have put up with your discourtesy for years, merely because you are a member of the Supreme Court. But I'm telling you now that the next time there is a complaint against you, you'll be suspended from the privileges of the golf course."

When a woman lawyer appeared in the courtroom, McReynolds reportedly muttered: "I see the female is here again." He often left the bench when a woman lawyer rose to present a case. He found the wearing of wristwatches by men effeminate, and the use of red fingernail polish by women vulgar.

McReynolds forbade smoking in his presence, and is said to have been responsible for the "No Smoking" signs in the Supreme Court Building, inaugurated during his tenure. He announced to any justice who attempted to smoke in conference that "tobacco smoke is personally objectionable to me". Any who tried "were stopped at the threshold".

But McReynolds was reportedly "extremely charitable" to the pages who worked at the Court, and had a great love of children. For example, he gave very generous assistance and adopted 33 children who were victims of the German bombing of London in 1940, and left a sizable fortune to charity. After Oliver Wendell Holmes's wife died, McReynolds wept at her funeral. Holmes wrote in 1926: "Poor McReynolds is, I think, a man of feeling and of more secret kindliness than he would get credit for."

McReynolds often entertained at his apartment, and occasionally passed cigarettes to his guests. He often invited people for brunch on Sunday mornings. According to William O. Douglas, "On these informal occasions in his own home he was the essence of hospitality and a very delightful companion." Once, when riding to his office on a street car, a drunk got on board and fell out in the aisle. McReynolds picked him up, helped him back to his seat, and sat beside him until they reached the top of Capitol Hill, leaving him only after giving explicit instructions to the conductor. When he was required to preside in court, due to absence of more senior justices, "he was the soul of courtesy, graciously greeting and raptly listening to the arguments by lawyers of both sexes." The public McReynolds was noted for his hospitality. He entertained frequently at the Willard Hotel with guest lists of 150 people, including his fellow justices, and at an annual eggnog party that was one of the social highlights of the Christmas season. Alice Roosevelt, one of many friends, requested the services of his cook, Mrs. Parker, for her wedding breakfast on the occasion of her marriage to Nicholas Longworth.

== Retirement ==
After a substantial hearing loss in 1925, McReynolds strongly intended to resign from the Court, and was dissuaded only by requests by many friends, who called him "one of the few who have courageously stood for the rights of property and of the citizen." McReynolds ultimately retired on January 31, 1941, and assumed senior status. He lived at the Rochambeau apartment complex in Washington, D.C. from 1915 until President Roosevelt requisitioned the building in 1935 for his New Deal requirements. McReynolds found a new apartment at 2400 Sixteenth Street. After the deaths of John Hessin Clarke and Harlan F. Stone in 1945 and 1946 respectively, he was the last surviving member of the Taft Court.

== Death and legacy ==
McReynolds never married. He died on August 24, 1946, and was buried in the Elkton Cemetery in Elkton, Kentucky. Elkton residents fondly remembered him, pointing out both his home and office "with great pride and respect".

Knox wrote "in 1946 he [McReynolds] died a very lonely death in a hospital – without a single friend or relative at his bedside." He was buried in Kentucky, but no member of the Court attended his funeral. In contrast, as the clerk noted, when McReynolds's African-American messenger, Harry Parker, died in 1953, his funeral was attended by five or six justices, including the chief justice. McReynolds's brother, Robert, visited him in the hospital shortly before his death. In his will, McReynolds wrote, "let there be no service in Washington". The U.S. Marshal for the Supreme Court traveled to Elkton for the funeral. The Christian Science Monitor hailed McReynolds in tribute as "the last and lone champion on the Supreme Bench battling the steady encroachment of Federal powers on State and individual rights ... standing these later years at the Pass of Thermopylae".

McReynolds bequeathed his entire estate to charity. His largest bequest was to Children's Hospital in Washington, which he had supported for years. He gifted the hospital a new elevator, plus $10,000 (equivalent to $165,000 in 2025) and the residue of his estate. He also gave $10,000 and his judicial robe to Vanderbilt University, where he had served on the Board of Trustees for 30 years. He left his books and opinions to the Library of Congress.

== Papers ==
McReynolds's papers are held at many libraries around the country, mainly at the University of Virginia Law School; Harvard University Law School, Felix Frankfurter papers; John Knox papers (1920–80), available at the University of Virginia and Northwestern University; University of Kentucky at Lexington, Kentucky, William Jennings Price (1851–1952) papers; University of Michigan Bentley Historical Library, Frank Murphy papers; Minnesota Historical Society, Pierce Butler papers; Tennessee State Library and Archives, Robert Boyte Crawford Howell papers; University of Virginia, Homer Stille Cummings papers.

== See also ==
- List of justices of the Supreme Court of the United States
- List of law clerks for the third seat of the Supreme Court of the United States
- List of United States Supreme Court justices by time in office
- United States Supreme Court cases during the Hughes Court
- United States Supreme Court cases during the Taft Court
- United States Supreme Court cases during the White Court
- List of United States federal judges by longevity of service

== Notes ==
Legal offices
Preceded by George Wickersham	United States Attorney General; 1913–1914	Succeeded by Thomas Gregory
Preceded by Horace Lurton	Associate Justice of the Supreme Court of the United States; 1914–1941	Succeeded by James Byrnes
