= Leroy John Contie Jr. =

American judge (1920–2001)

Senior Judge of the United States Court of Appeals for the Sixth Circuit
- In office June 30, 1986 – May 11, 2001

Judge of the United States Court of Appeals for the Sixth Circuit
- In office March 9, 1982 – June 30, 1986
- Appointed by: Ronald Reagan
- Preceded by: Anthony J. Celebrezze
- Succeeded by: Alan Eugene Norris

Judge of the United States District Court for the Northern District of Ohio
- In office December 6, 1971 – March 23, 1982
- Appointed by: Richard Nixon
- Preceded by: James C. Connell
- Succeeded by: David Dudley Dowd Jr.

Personal details
- Born: Leroy John Contie Jr. April 2, 1920 Canton, Ohio, U.S.
- Died: May 11, 2001 (aged 81) Cleveland, Ohio, U.S.
- Education: University of Michigan (BA); University of Michigan Law School (JD)

Leroy John Contie Jr. (April 2, 1920 – May 11, 2001) was a United States circuit judge of the United States Court of Appeals for the Sixth Circuit and a United States district judge of the United States District Court for the Northern District of Ohio.

== Education ==
Contie was born in Canton, Ohio. He received his Bachelor of Arts degree from University of Michigan in 1941 and his Juris Doctor from the University of Michigan Law School in 1948.

== Career ==
Contie was in the United States Army from 1942 to 1946, leaving with the rank of sergeant. Contie was in private practice in Canton from 1948 to 1952 and was a law director for the City of Canton from 1951 to 1960. He was in private practice in Canton from 1960 to 1969 and was the judge of the Stark County Court of Common Pleas from 1969 to 1971.

== Federal judicial service ==
President Richard Nixon nominated Contie to the United States District Court for the Northern District of Ohio on November 19, 1971, to the seat vacated by Judge James C. Connell. Confirmed by the Senate on December 1, 1971, and received his commission on December 6, 1971. His service was terminated on March 23, 1982, due to elevation to the Sixth Circuit.

President Ronald Reagan nominated Contie to the United States Court of Appeals for the Sixth Circuit on January 26, 1982, to the seat vacated by Judge Anthony J. Celebrezze. He was confirmed by the Senate on March 4, 1982, and received his commission on March 9, 1982. He assumed senior status on June 30, 1986, and remained on the court until his death on May 11, 2001, in Cleveland, Ohio.

== Sources ==
Legal offices
| Preceded by James C. Connell | Judge of the United States District Court for the Northern District of Ohio; 1971–1982 | Succeeded by David Dudley Dowd Jr. |
| Preceded by Anthony J. Celebrezze | Judge of the United States Court of Appeals for the Sixth Circuit; 1982–1986 | Succeeded by Alan Eugene Norris |
