= John Hessin Clarke =

US Supreme Court justice from 1916 to 1922

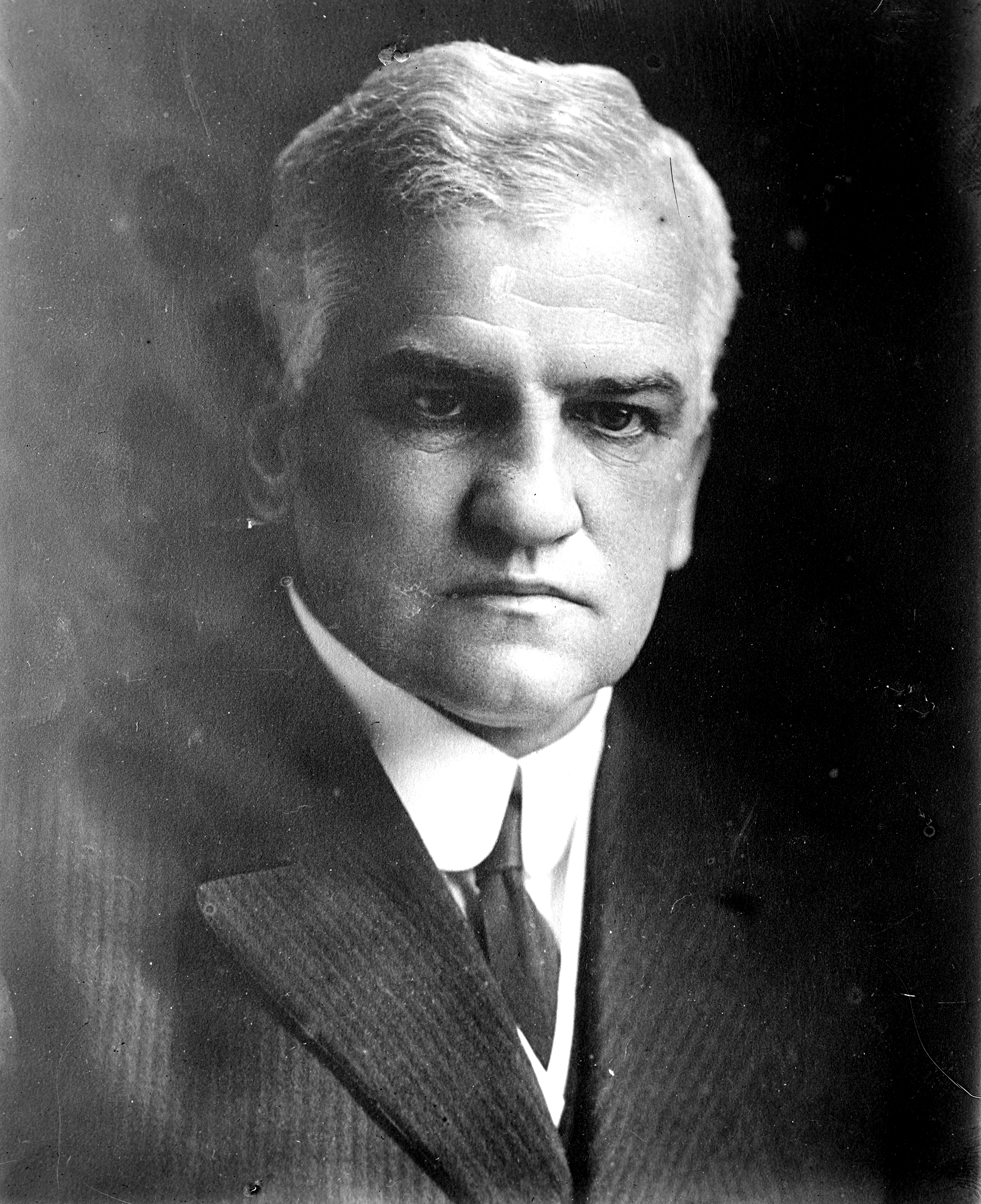
- Clarke, c. 1920

Associate Justice of the Supreme Court of the United States
- In office October 9, 1916 – September 18, 1922
- Nominated by: Woodrow Wilson
- Preceded by: Charles Evans Hughes
- Succeeded by: George Sutherland

Judge of the United States District Court for the Northern District of Ohio
- In office July 21, 1914 – July 24, 1916
- Nominated by: Woodrow Wilson
- Preceded by: William Day
- Succeeded by: David Westenhaver

Personal details
- Born: September 18, 1857 New Lisbon, Ohio, U.S. (now Lisbon)
- Died: March 22, 1945 (aged 87) San Diego, California, U.S.
- Party: Democratic
- Education: Case Western Reserve University (BA)

John Hessin Clarke (September 18, 1857 – March 22, 1945) was an American lawyer and judge who served as an associate justice of the Supreme Court of the United States from 1916 to 1922.

== Early life ==
Born in New Lisbon, Ohio, Clarke was the third and youngest child and only son of John Clarke (1814–1884), a Quaker immigrant from County Antrim, Ireland who became a lawyer and judge in the United States, and his wife Melissa Hessin. He attended New Lisbon High School and Western Reserve College, where he joined the Delta Kappa Epsilon fraternity. He graduated Phi Beta Kappa in 1877. Clarke did not attend law school but studied the law under his father's direction and passed the bar exam cum laude in 1878.

After practicing law in New Lisbon for two years, Clarke moved to Youngstown, where he purchased a half-share in the Youngstown Vindicator. The Vindicator was a Democratic newspaper, and Clarke, a reform-minded Bourbon Democrat, wrote several articles opposing the growing power of corporate monopolies and promoting such causes as civil-service reform. He also became involved in local party politics and civic causes. His efforts to prevent Calvin S. Brice's renomination as the party's candidate for the United States Senate in 1894 ended in failure, but he worked successfully to oppose the election of a Republican candidate for mayor of Youngstown who was a member of the American Protective Association. A "gold bug" in 1896, Clarke's opposition to William Jennings Bryan's nomination as the Democratic Party's presidential candidate was so great that he bolted the party and participated in the subsequent "Gold Bug" convention in Indianapolis that nominated Senator John M. Palmer later that year.

== Progressive politician ==
Soon after the 1896 presidential election, Clarke moved to Cleveland, where he became a partner in the law firm of Williamson and Cushing. The firm represented corporate and railroad interests, and Clarke soon demonstrated his worth, replacing senior partner Samuel W. Williamson as the general counsel for the New York, Chicago and St. Louis Railroad. Yet Clarke remained involved in the Democratic Party. His politics evolved during this period, as Clarke abandoned many of the political views of his youth, including those involving states' rights, and instead embraced the program of the emerging progressive movement. Clarke's political evolution during this period was facilitated considerably by his friendship with Cleveland mayor Tom L. Johnson, who helped restore Clarke's standing within the state party after Clarke's previous failure to support Bryan's presidential bid.

In 1903, Johnson succeeded in taking control of the state Democratic Party, an effort which Clarke supported. At the party's convention that August, Clarke was nominated as the Democratic candidate for the United States Senate. Though an accomplished orator, Clarke's work as a railroad attorney, his opposition to Bryan's presidential candidacy seven years before, and his own personal limitations all contributed to his failure to upset his Republican rival, Mark Hanna, who won the balloting in the Ohio General Assembly by 115 votes to 25 for Clarke.

After his defeat, Clarke reduced his participation in party politics and focused instead on his legal work for a time. Yet Clarke soon returned to politics, withdrawing from the partnership with Williamson and Cushing in 1907. His relationship with Johnson suffered after Clarke supported the successful candidacy of conservative Democrat Judson Harmon for governor in 1908; in response, when nominating a candidate for the United States Senate race in 1910, Johnson passed over Clarke in favor of Atlee Pomerene, the eventual winner. Clarke's support for incorporating progressive reforms into the Ohio Constitution in 1911, however, helped to restore his standing among Ohio progressives. Clarke attempted to parlay this into a second run for a United States Senate seat early in 1914, but he faced opposition in the primary from Ohio Attorney General Timothy S. Hogan and by the spring appeared to be in danger of losing the race.

== Judicial career ==
=== Federal judge ===
Clarke was in the middle of his primary campaign when he was appointed by President Woodrow Wilson on July 15, 1914, to fill a vacancy on the U.S. District Court for the Northern District of Ohio created by the resignation of William Louis Day. Clarke was the choice of both Woodrow Wilson and Attorney General James Clark McReynolds, who felt that the position required a "first-rate appointment" to deal with the backlog in the court's docket, and that Clarke's high standing before the Ohio bar marked him out as a man of "decided ability". Wilson also wanted a candidate who could be groomed as a prospective Supreme Court nominee, given the relative dearth of Democratic prospects on the federal bench after sixteen years of Republican presidents. He was confirmed by the United States Senate on July 21, 1914, and received commission the same day.

Clarke soon vindicated their hopes, establishing himself as an effective judge. Though the attorneys before him considered him too formal and aloof, he cleared the backlogged docket and earned their respect for his ability. His work was of the highest quality, with only five of the 662 suits he tried reversed, and none of these for errors in the admission of evidence. Clarke himself enjoyed his time at the district level, finding his duties not too onerous and the variety of cases before him stimulating.

=== Associate Justice ===
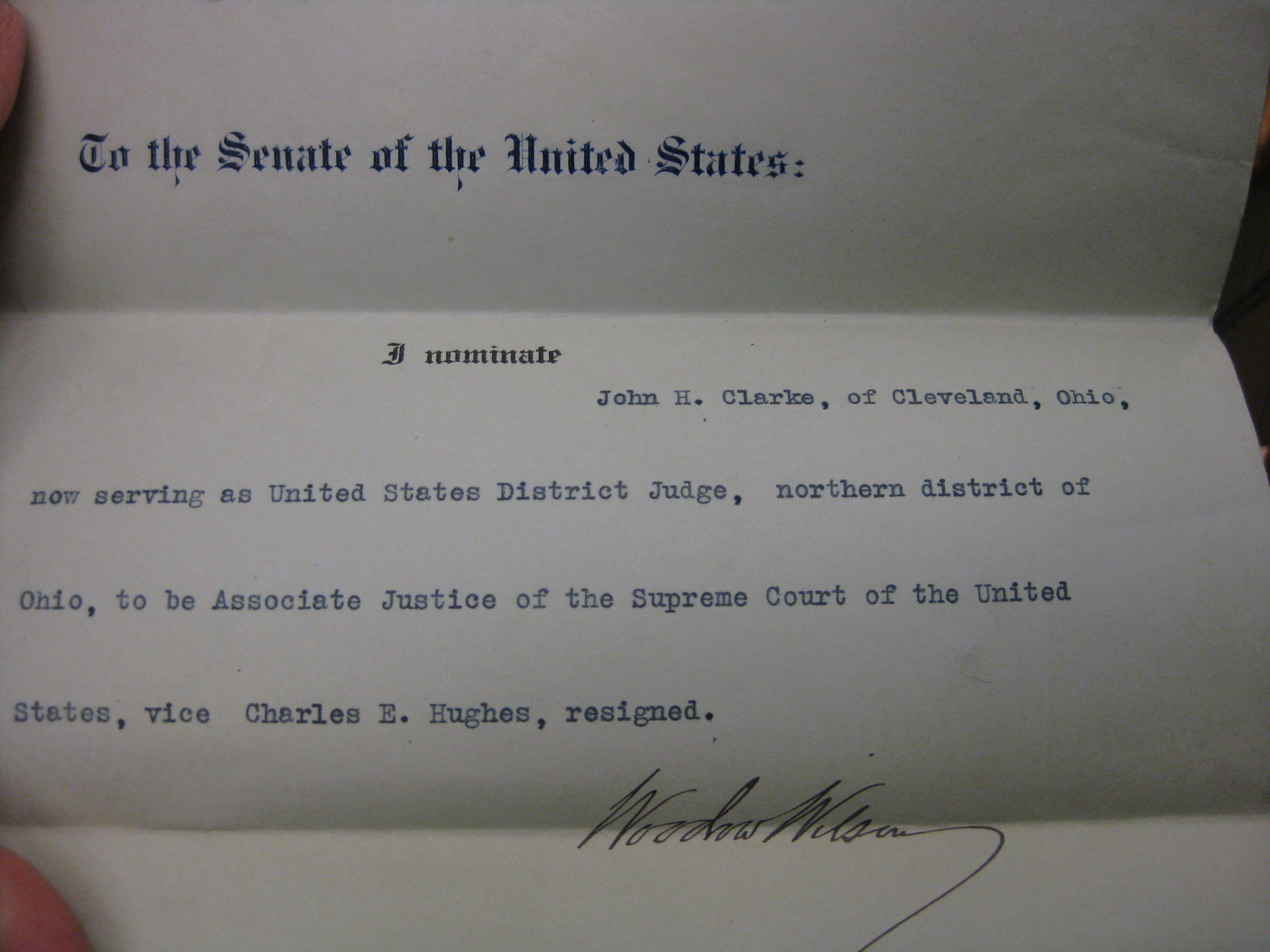
Clarke's Supreme Court nomination

In June 1916, a vacancy arose on the Supreme Court when Associate Justice Charles Evans Hughes resigned to accept the Republican nomination for President. Wilson wanted to fill the seat by appointing his Attorney General, Thomas W. Gregory, but Gregory demurred and suggested Clarke instead. After having Newton Baker (Wilson's Secretary of War and a close friend of Clarke's) speak with Clarke to confirm his opposition to trusts, Wilson offered Clarke the nomination. Though Clarke was reluctant to abandon trial for appellate work, he felt he could not pass on such an honor and accepted. Wilson sent his name to the Senate on July 14, 1916, and the United States Senate confirmed Clarke unanimously ten days later. He was sworn into office on October 9, 1916.

Clarke's years on the court were unhappy ones. Having enjoyed the autonomy of a trial court judge, he chafed at the Supreme Court's routine, hating the arguments, the extended conferences, and the need to accommodate other justices' views when writing opinions. The record of his opinions during his five years on the bench reflected this dissatisfaction. While he issued 129 majority opinions, he also dissented 57 times in his short term on the court. While he enjoyed good relations with the other justices (and developed close friendships with William R. Day and Willis Van Devanter), he had an unpleasant relationship with Justice James Clark McReynolds, which later contributed to his decision to leave the Court. Such was McReynolds's animosity towards Clarke that, when Clarke resigned, McReynolds refused to sign the official letter of regret over his departure.

Philosophically, Clarke demonstrated an affinity for legal realism in his opinions. He often voted with Oliver Wendell Holmes Jr. and Louis Brandeis, usually in dissent from the conservative majority dominant on the Court at that time, though Holmes's famous dissent from the Abrams v. United States decision was in response to Clarke's majority opinion. As a Progressive, he supported the power of both national and state authorities to regulate the economy, particularly with regard to regulating child labor. His dissents on two cases, Hammer v. Dagenhart and Bailey v. Drexel Furniture Company, supported Congress's authority under the Commerce Clause (in the Hammer case) and the Taxing and Spending Clause (in the Bailey case) to address what Progressives saw as a major social problem. He also demonstrated his opposition to monopoly in United States v. Reading Company, in a ruling that became a prominent part of anti-trust law.

==== Resignation ====
Clarke's impact on the Court's jurisprudence was limited by his relatively brief service. On September 1, 1922, Clarke sent a letter to President Warren G. Harding announcing his intention to resign from the Court. Several factors motivated his decision. Apart from his dissatisfaction with his work as a justice and his ongoing difficulties with McReynolds, Clarke had recently lost his sisters, Ida and Alice. Moreover, having witnessed the physical decline of Chief Justice Edward Douglass White, he wished to avoid a similar deterioration while on the bench. Clarke had few regrets about his decision, and informed his successor, George Sutherland, that the latter was embarking on "a dog's life."

== Later years ==
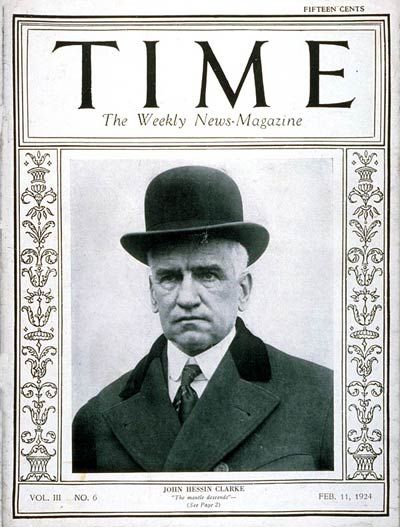
Time Cover, 11 Feb 1924

=== Campaigning to join the League of Nations ===
In an interview three days after submitting his resignation, Clarke outlined a new cause he wanted to pursue – convincing Americans that the United States should join the League of Nations. At the time, prospects for League entry were at a low ebb, its proponents having suffered the dual setback of the Senate's rejection of the Versailles Treaty and the election of the anti-League Republican Warren G. Harding as president in 1920. Clarke's public pronouncements gave their cause a new life, and in October 1922 he became the president of a new organization, the League of Nations Non-Partisan Association. Modeled after the British League of Nations Union, the Association's mission was to awaken the underlying support for joining the League that its founders believed existed within the United States and mobilize it to overcome the opposition to League participation. Through it, Clarke quickly emerged as Wilson's successor in the campaign for League membership.

Though Clarke committed himself to the cause through a series of speaking tours, he soon faced several challenges. Expenditures quickly outpaced the Association's funding, with limited resources squandered on building up an extensive organization. Though Clarke organized a restructuring in June 1923, a far greater problem lay in his underestimation of the task he faced. Contrary to Clarke's expectations, there was no latent undercurrent of support for joining the League, only skepticism and hostility to the idea. Addressing this required a far different level of commitment than Clarke expected, forcing him and the rest of the Association leadership to scale back their goals. Focusing on the entry into the World Court, Clarke continued to campaign for American involvement in international organizations and agreements for the remainder of the decade.

=== Retirement ===
By the end of 1927, Clarke's worsening deafness and frustration with the Association' failures led him to resign from the Association's presidency. In retirement, Clarke remained vigorous and active with a regimen of reading and travel. He also continued public service, becoming a trustee of Western Reserve University. In 1932, he backed a clandestine effort to nominate Newton Baker as the Democratic presidential candidate, but after it failed, Clarke supported the New Deal and President Franklin D. Roosevelt. Despite misgivings about the methods, he sympathized with the goals underlying the president's Supreme Court "packing" plan, and at Roosevelt's request Clarke made a radio broadcast in March 1937 in which he defended the constitutionality of the proposal.

In 1931 Clarke moved from Cleveland to San Diego, where he lived in the El Cortez Apartment Hotel. It was there that he suffered a heart attack and died on March 22, 1945. He was later honored by his alma mater by having a residence hall, Clarke Tower, named after him on the Case Western Reserve campus.

== See also ==
- List of justices of the Supreme Court of the United States

== Bibliography ==
- Bickel, Alexander M.; Benno C. Schmidt Jr. (1985). The Judiciary and Responsible Government 1910-21 (History of the Supreme Court of the United States). Macmillan Publishing Company.
- Pratt, Walter F. Jr. (1999). The Supreme Court under Edward Douglass White, 1910-1921. University of South Carolina Press.
- Warner, Hoyt Landon (1959). The Life of Mr. Justice Clarke. Cleveland, Ohio: Western Reserve University Press.

Legal offices
Preceded by William Day	Judge of the United States District Court for the Northern District of Ohio; 1914–1916	Succeeded by David Westenhaver
Preceded by Charles Hughes	Associate Justice of the Supreme Court of the United States; 1916–1922	Succeeded by George Sutherland
Awards and achievements
Preceded by Edward Eberle	Cover of Time; February 11, 1924	Succeeded by Eleftherios Venizelos
