= Alan Eugene Norris =

American judge (born 1935)

Alan Norris
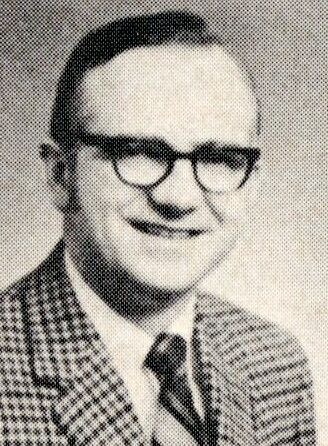

Senior Judge of the United States Court of Appeals for the Sixth Circuit
- Incumbent
- Assumed office July 1, 2001

Judge of the United States Court of Appeals for the Sixth Circuit
- In office July 1, 1986 – July 1, 2001
- Appointed by: Ronald Reagan
- Preceded by: Leroy John Contie Jr.
- Succeeded by: Deborah L. Cook

Member of the Ohio House of Representatives from the 27th district
- In office January 3, 1967 – December 31, 1980
- Preceded by: Constituency established
- Succeeded by: Jo Ann Davidson

Personal details
- Born: Alan Eugene Norris; August 15, 1935 (age 91) Columbus, Ohio, U.S.
- Party: Republican
- Education: Otterbein University (BA); New York University (LLB); University of Virginia (LLM)

Alan Eugene Norris (born August 15, 1935) is a Senior United States circuit judge of the United States Court of Appeals for the Sixth Circuit.

== Education and career ==
Born in Columbus, Ohio, Norris received a Bachelor of Arts degree from Otterbein College in 1957, a Bachelor of Laws from New York University School of Law in 1960, and a Master of Laws from University of Virginia School of Law in 1986. He was a law clerk to Justice Kingsley A. Taft of the Supreme Court of Ohio from 1960 to 1961. Norris was in private practice in Columbus from 1961 to 1962, and in Westerville, Ohio from 1962 to 1980, also serving as a member of the Ohio House of Representatives from 1967 to 1980. He was an instructor at Otterbein College from 1976 to 1980. He was a Judge of the Ohio Court of Appeals, Tenth District from 1980 to 1986.

== Federal judicial service ==
On April 22, 1986, Norris was nominated by President Ronald Reagan to a seat on the United States Court of Appeals for the Sixth Circuit vacated by Judge Leroy John Contie Jr. Norris was confirmed by the United States Senate on June 6, 1986, and received his commission on July 1, 1986. He assumed senior status on July 1, 2001.

== Sources ==
Legal offices
Preceded by Leroy John Contie Jr.	Judge of the United States Court of Appeals for the Sixth Circuit; 1986–2001	Succeeded by Deborah L. Cook
