= Charles Joseph McNamee =

American judge

Chief Judge of the United States District Court for the Northern District of Ohio
- In office 1960
- Preceded by: Frank Le Blond Kloeb
- Succeeded by: James C. Connell

Judge of the United States District Court for the Northern District of Ohio
- In office March 9, 1951 – May 2, 1964
- Appointed by: Harry S. Truman
- Preceded by: Robert Nugen Wilkin
- Succeeded by: Seat abolished

Personal details
- Born: Charles Joseph McNamee; December 5, 1890 Cleveland, Ohio, U.S.
- Died: May 2, 1964 (aged 73)
- Education: Cleveland Law School (LLB)

Military service
- Branch/service: United States Army
- Years of service: 1917–1919
- Battles/wars: World War I

Charles Joseph McNamee (December 5, 1890 – May 2, 1964) was an American attorney and jurist who served as a United States district judge of the United States District Court for the Northern District of Ohio.

== Early life and education ==
Born in Cleveland, Ohio, McNamee received a Bachelor of Laws from Cleveland Law School (now Cleveland State University College of Law) in 1917. He served in the United States Army during World War I from 1917 to 1919, where he entered as a private and rose to the rank of 2nd lieutenant in the Army Service Corps. He left France in September 1919. He then entered private practice in Cleveland from 1921 to 1933.

== Career ==
He was chief assistant county prosecutor for Cuyahoga County, Ohio from 1933 to 1938. He was a Judge of the Common Pleas Court for Cuyahoga County from 1939 to 1949, and of the Court of Appeals of Ohio from 1949 to 1951.

On February 8, 1951, McNamee was nominated by President Harry S. Truman to a seat on the United States District Court for the Northern District of Ohio vacated by Judge Robert Nugen Wilkin. McNamee was confirmed by the United States Senate on March 6, 1951, and received his commission on March 9, 1951. He served as Chief Judge in 1960. McNamee remained on the court until his death on May 2, 1964.

== Sources ==
Legal offices
Preceded by Robert Nugen Wilkin	Judge of the United States District Court for the Northern District of Ohio; 1951–1964	Succeeded by Seat abolished
Preceded by Frank Le Blond Kloeb	Chief Judge of the United States District Court for the Northern District of Ohio; 1960	Succeeded by James C. Connell
