= Eberlein Drive =

American basketball team

- Leagues: The Basketball Tournament
- Founded: 2014
- History: Eberlein Drive (2014–16, 2018–2025); The Stickmen (2017); Davis Steel (2026)
- General manager: Matt Mitchell & Jacob Hirschmann
- Head coach: Jordan Surenkamp
- Assistants: Zachary Hopp, Vinny Vetrone, Jacob Freeze & Kenny Bennett
- Championships: 1 TBT (2026)
- Website: Team page

Eberlein Drive is an American basketball team that participates in The Basketball Tournament (TBT), an annual winner-take-all single-elimination tournament. The team has participated in the tournament since its 2014 inaugural playing. The roster of Eberlein Drive consists of professional basketball players who compete outside of the NBA. The team is named after the street in Fraser, Michigan, that co-general manager Jacob Hirschmann grew up on. In 2017 they competed as The Stickmen and in 2026 Davis Steel.

== History ==
In the first tournament, TBT 2014, 29th seed Eberlein Drive was eliminated in the first round, losing 113–71 to 4th seed Big Apple Basketball. The 42 point differential resulted in Eberlein Drive placing last in the final standings of the 32-team field. The team had suited up with several amateur players, including team co-founder Jacob Hirschmann, who was sent to the hospital after being dunked on by 7-foot former UMass center Luke Bonner. Sports Illustrated referred to Eberlein Drive as "the lost cause of The Basketball Tournament".

In the second tournament, TBT 2015, Eberlein Drive received sponsorship from DraftKings, and bolstered their roster with players such as Von Wafer and Renaldo Balkman. Eberlein Drive was one of several teams that received a first round bye, based on fan voting. In the second round of play in the Midwest region, 5th seed Eberlein Drive fell to 13th seed Sconnie Legends, 101–95.

In the third tournament, TBT 2016, Eberlein Drive was seeded 12th in the Midwest, and fell in their first-round game to 5th seed Pedro's Posse, 99–89. Justin Dentmon had 32 points for Eberlein Drive.

In the fourth tournament, TBT 2017, the team joined with actor Michael Rapaport and played under the name The Stickmen. Notable players included Lou Amundson, Markel Brown, Joe Alexander, and Donald Sloan. As the 3rd seed in the West, the team won their first-round game, defeating 14th seed Air Force Bomb Squad, 105–63. In the second round, they fell to 6th seed Team Challenge ALS, 87–73. Team Challenge ALS went on to be the tournament runners-up.

In the fifth tournament, TBT 2018, the team resumed playing under the Eberlein Drive name. Amundson and Sloan returned to the team, joined by notables including Jerome Randle and James Michael McAdoo. As the 7th seed in the West region, the team won their region, with victories over 10th seed Broad Street Brawlers (86–71), 2nd seed Team Colorado (83–76), 3rd seed Gael Force (72–59), and 1st seed Team Challenge ALS (78–67). In the semifinals, Eberlein Drive defeated Midwest winners Team Fredette, who were led by Jimmer Fredette, 80–76. Eberlein Drive advanced to meet three-time defending champion Overseas Elite in the championship game on August 3, where they were defeated, 70–58.

In the sixth tournament, TBT 2019, the team was the top seed in the Salt Lake Regional. Returning players included McAdoo, Randle, and Sloan. New notables included Taylor Braun and Kenny Kadji. They won their first-round game, 83–80, over Team Utah, erasing a 7-point deficit at the time the Elam Ending target score was set. (Note: Since the 2018 edition, TBT has used a procedure known as the Elam Ending, named after its creator Nick Elam, at the end of all games. At the first game stoppage with 4 minutes or less remaining in the fourth quarter, the game clock is switched off and 8 points are added to the leading (or tied) team's score, setting the "target score". The game then proceeds with the shot clock enforced, and the first team to reach or exceed the target score wins.) Their second-round game was a narrow victory over L.A. Cheaters, 86–84, advancing Eberlein Drive to the regional final where they again had a narrow victory, defeating Team Challenge ALS, 68–67. They next played in the quarterfinals in Chicago on August 1, falling 79–71 to the eventual tournament champion, Carmen's Crew.

In the seventh tournament, TBT 2020, the team was the No. 5 seed in a field of 24, reduced in size due to the COVID-19 pandemic. The day before the team's first game, scheduled against the 12th seed, team Brotherly Love, Eberlein Drive had to withdraw from the tournament, due to a player testing positive for COVID-19. As a result, Brotherly Love advanced to the quarterfinals.

In the eighth tournament, TBT 2021, the team was placed in the Wichita Regional as the top seed. After winning their first two games, over NG Saints and Stillwater Stars by scores of 86–68 and 119–67, respectively, Eberlein Drive lost to Florida TNT, the fifth seed in the bracket, by a score of 74–67.

In the ninth tournament, TBT 2022, the team was seeded second in the Wichita Regional, but lost in the first round to Bleed Green, a team of alumni from the North Texas Mean Green, by a score of 79–78.

In their tenth tournament, TBT 2023, they were seeded third in the Louisville regional and lost to the Jackson TN Underdawgs 86-66. In 2026, the team partnered with Davis Sports Corp. to form Davis Steel, winning the tournament after 13 years of competing.

=== Record by years ===
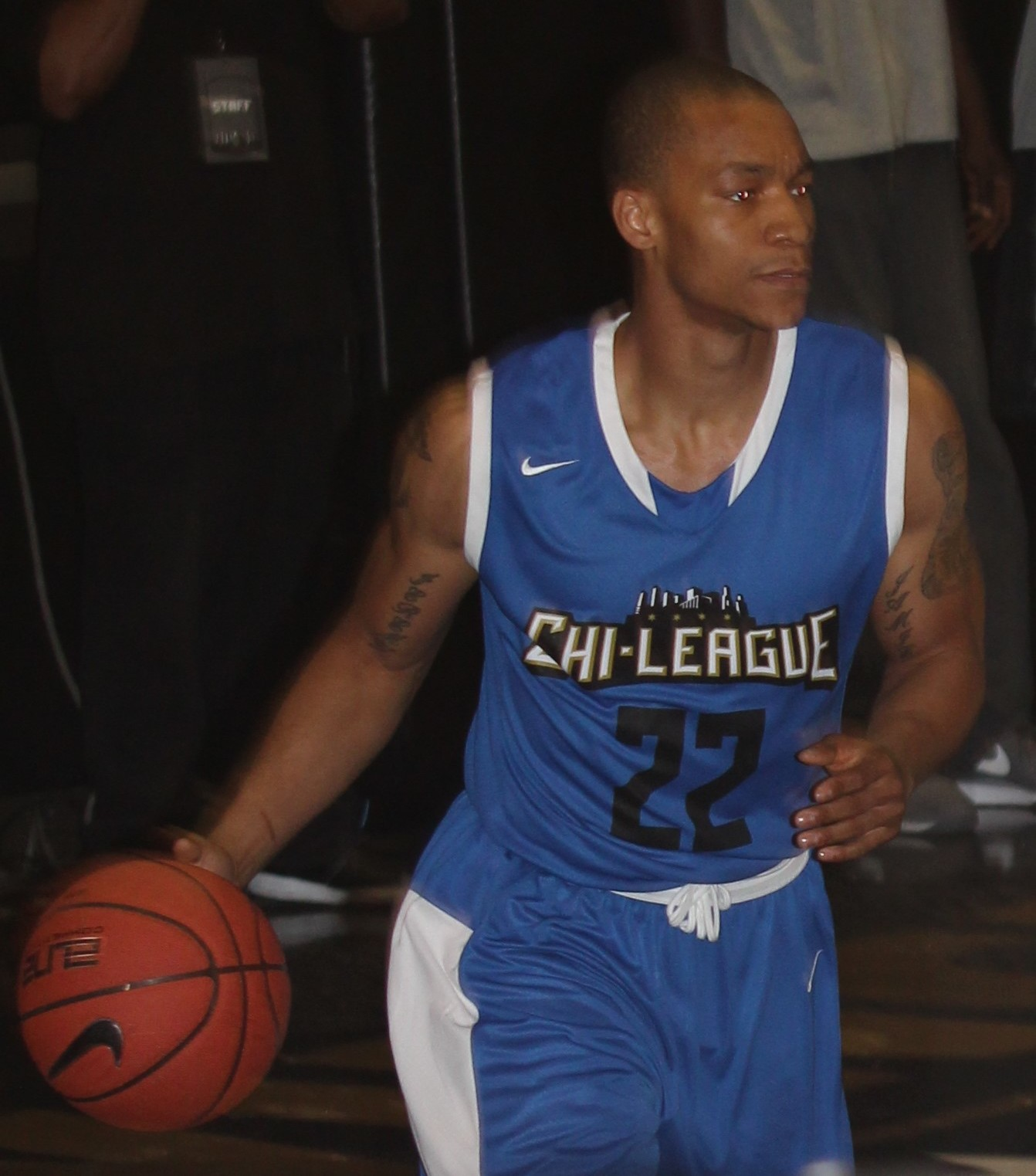
Jerome Randle was named to the 2018 All-Tournament team.

Year	Seed	Won	Lost	Notes
2014	29th overall	0	1	Finished last in 32-team field
2015	5th Midwest	0	1	Lost in first round
2016	12th Midwest	0	1	Lost in first round
2017	3rd West	1	1	Team recorded first win (Note: In 2017, the team played under the name The Stickmen.)
2018	7th West	5	1	Lost championship game
2019	1st Salt Lake	3	1	Lost in quarterfinals
2020	5th overall	0	0	Withdrew
2021	1st Wichita	2	1	Lost in regional semifinals
2022	2nd Wichita	0	1	Lost in first round
2023	3rd Louisville	0	1	Lost in first round
2024	6th Butler	4	1	Lost in semifinals
2025	2nd Lexington	5	1	Lost championship game
2026	A1 Non-alumni	5	0	Won championship game (Note: In 2026, the team competed as Davis Steel.)
Total		25	11	

=== Awards ===
Year	Pos	Player	Award
2018	G	Jerome Randle	All-Tournament
2018	GM	Matt Mitchell & Jacob Hirschmann	All-Tournament
2024	PF	Tyler Stone	All-Tournament
2024	HC	Jordan Surenkamp	All-Tournament
2025	G	Gabe York	All-Tournament
2025	GM	Matt Mitchell & Jacob Hirschmann (2)	All-Tournament
2026	G	Gabe York	Tournament MVP
2026	G	Gabe York	All-Tournament

== Roster ==
- 2024 Roster
  - Anthony Clemmons
  - Archie Goodwin
  - Daishon Knight
  - Jake Stephens
  - Lesley Varner II
  - Max Schmarzo
  - Michael Ertel II
  - Nate Roberts
  - Ryan Taylor
  - Terrell Brown
  - Tyler Cain
  - Tyler Stone
- 2025 Roster
  - AJ Slaughter
  - Anthony Clemmons
  - Aubrey Dawkins
  - Christian Mekowulu
  - Coty Clarke
  - Dayvion McKnight
  - Junathaen Watson
  - Rion Brown
  - Tommy Rutherford
- 2026 Roster (as Davis Steel)
  - Anthony Clemmons
  - Cam McGriff
  - DJ Rodman
  - Gabe York
  - Hassani Gravett
  - James Reese
  - Nate Watson
  - Pedro Bradshaw
  - Terrell Brown
  - Terry Taylor
  - Tommy Rutherford
