= The Basketball Tournament 2023 =

Single elimination basketball tournament

The Basketball Tournament
- 2023

Tournament information
- Location: Regional sites: Cincinnati, Ohio; Dayton, Ohio; Louisville, Kentucky; Lubbock, Texas; Syracuse, New York; Wheeling, West Virginia; Wichita, Kansas; Semifinal/Championship site: Philadelphia, Pennsylvania
- Dates: July 19–August 3, 2023
- Tournament format(s): Single elimination
- Participants: 64 teams
- Purse: Championship: US$1,000,000 winner-take-all

Final positions
- Champions: Heartfire
- Runner-up: Bleed Green

Tournament statistics
- MVP: Brandon Jefferson
- Top scorer(s): Brandon Jefferson (115)
- Games played: 63

The Basketball Tournament 2023 was the tenth edition of The Basketball Tournament (TBT), a 5-on-5, single elimination basketball tournament with a $1 million winner-take-all prize. The tournament, involving 64 teams, began on July 19 and ended on August 3 with the championship game in Philadelphia, Pennsylvania. The tournament format was similar to that of the last edition in 2022—64 teams, each playing in one of eight regionals.

The event had a "championship week", starting with the regional winners advancing to quarterfinals at one of four sites, Dayton, Louisville, Wheeling, WV, and Wichita. The quarterfinal winners then traveled to Philadelphia for the semifinals and championship game. Heartfire, a team sponsored by MedImpact, won the tournament.

== Format ==
For its 2023 edition, TBT retained its traditional 64-team format and eight-region format, with each regional involving eight teams at a single host site (similar in format to the NCAA Division II men's and women's tournaments). Wichita is serving as host for two separate regionals.

In a feature it calls "Run It Back", TBT organizers invited all teams that won first-round games in the 2022 edition to play in 2023. The remaining teams, and the regional placements for all entrants, were revealed in a selection special hosted by Andrew Zoldan with analyst Seth Greenberg that aired on TBT's YouTube channel on June 21, 2023.

As with previous years, all tournament games operate with the "Elam Ending", a format of ending the game without use of a game clock. Under the Elam Ending, the clock is turned off at the first dead-ball whistle with 4 minutes or less to play in the game. At that time, a target score, equal to the score of the leading team (or tied teams) plus eight, is set, and the first team to reach this target score is declared the winner of the game. Thus, all games end on a made basket (field goal or free throw) and there is no overtime.

== Venues ==
The Basketball Tournament 2023 featured games in eight locations, seven of which hosted a regional. The eighth hosted the championship weekend (two semifinal contests and the championship game). Official regional names, if different from the location names, are indicated in the listings below the location names.

Regional sites only Regional and quarterfinal site Championship site
Regional sites only Regional and quarterfinal site Championship site	Cincinnati (Xavier)	Lubbock	Syracuse	Dayton
Regional sites only Regional and quarterfinal site Championship site	Cintas Center	United Supermarkets Arena	The Oncenter	UD Arena
Regional sites only Regional and quarterfinal site Championship site	Capacity: 10,224	Capacity: 15,300	Capacity: 7,000	Capacity: 13,409
Regional sites only Regional and quarterfinal site Championship site	Louisville	Wheeling (West Virginia)	Wichita	Philadelphia (Championship)
Regional sites only Regional and quarterfinal site Championship site	Freedom Hall	WesBanco Arena	Charles Koch Arena	Daskalakis Athletic Center
Regional sites only Regional and quarterfinal site Championship site	Capacity: 18,865	Capacity: 5,406	Capacity: 10,506	Capacity: 2,509

== Teams ==
TBT has a history of teams rostered primarily with alumni from specific NCAA Division I college basketball programs; 33 such teams entered the 2023 tournament. Three other teams were rostered primarily with alumni from groups of NCAA basketball programs sharing a common bond. Two mostly consist of alumni from a specific Division I conference, one is drawn from a group of historic basketball rivals, another is drawn from NCAA Division III alumni, and the last is drawn from historically black colleges and universities.

Name	College or sponsor affiliation	Source of team name	Region
AfterShocks	Wichita State alumni	School nickname of Shockers	Wichita 2
Air Raiders	Texas Tech alumni	School nickname of Red Raiders	Lubbock
Athletics Miami	—	Team sponsor Athletics Miami, a basketball facility	Dayton
Austin's Own	Texas alumni	School location in Austin	Lubbock
B1 Ballers	—		Wichita 2
Beale Street Boys	Memphis alumni	Street where school arena is located	Wichita 2
Best Virginia	West Virginia alumni		West Virginia
Big 5	Philadelphia Big 5 alumni		Syracuse
Bleed Green	North Texas alumni	School nickname of Mean Green	Lubbock
Blue Collar U	Buffalo alumni	Primary school color, plus city's blue-collar image	Syracuse
Boeheim's Army	Syracuse alumni	Former Syracuse head coach Jim Boeheim	Syracuse
Broad Street Birds	Temple alumni	Street where school arena is located, Owl mascot	Wichita 2
Bucketneers	ETSU alumni	School nickname of Buccaneers	Xavier
Carmen's Crew	Ohio State alumni	"Carmen Ohio", Ohio State's school song	Dayton
Challenge ALS: Florida	—	Combination of former teams Challenge ALS and Florida TNT	West Virginia
The Commonwealth	UMass alumni	Commonwealth of Massachusetts	Syracuse
DaGuys STL	—	Team YouTube channel, with players mainly from Greater St. Louis	Wichita 2
DawgTown	Georgetown alumni	Team mascot Jack the Bulldog	West Virginia
Dubois Dream	—	Based out of Dubois, Pennsylvania	West Virginia
Eberlein Drive	—	Team owners' home street	Louisville
The Enchantment	New Mexico alumni	State nickname, "Land of Enchantment"	Lubbock
Fort Wayne Champs	—	Players with connections to Fort Wayne, Indiana	Xavier
Friday Beers (Note: Known in previous TBT editions as Armored Athlete.)	Armored Athlete		Dayton
Gataverse	Florida alumni	Florida Gators mascot	Louisville
Georgia Kingz	—	Players with connections to the state of Georgia	Xavier
Gutter Cat Gang (Note: Known in previous TBT editions as Team Hines.)	—	Team sponsor Gutter Cat Gang, an NFT company	Louisville
Happy Valley Hoopers	Penn State alumni	Location of the school in Happy Valley	Syracuse
HBCUnited	HBCU alumni		Lubbock
Heartfire	MedImpact	Arizona nonprofit HeartFire Missions, a provider of Christian medical mission trips	Wichita 1
Herd That	Marshall alumni	School nickname of Thundering Herd	West Virginia
India Rising	—	Players of Indian origin	Dayton
In the Lab	—	In The Lab, a basketball content creation company	Lubbock
Jackson TN Underdawgs	—	Players with connections to Jackson, Tennessee	Louisville
Juco Products	—	Players with connections to Junior colleges	Wichita 1
LA Cheaters	Drew League		Wichita 1
Living the Dream	—		Wichita 1
Mass Street	Kansas alumni	Short for Massachusetts Street, the main street through the central business district of the school's home of Lawrence	Wichita 1
Men of Mackey	Purdue alumni	Purdue home court Mackey Arena	Dayton
The Money Team	TMT	Team sponsor Floyd "Money" Mayweather	Xavier
Nasty Nati	Cincinnati alumni	Nickname of the city of Cincinnati	Xavier
The Nawf	—	Players with connections to Gwinnett County, Georgia	Louisville
The Nerd Team	—	Players from "more prestigious" universities	Syracuse
The Program for Autism	—	The Program NYC, a youth basketball initiative	Xavier
Purple & Black	Kansas State alumni	School colors	Wichita 2
Purple Hearts	—	Gun violence awareness	Lubbock
Ram Nation	VCU alumni	School nickname of Rams	West Virginia
Ram Up	Colorado State alumni	School nickname of Rams	Wichita 2
Red Scare	Dayton alumni	Name of Dayton student section	Dayton
The Rhody Way (Note: Withdrew from the tournament July 22.)	Rhode Island alumni	School mascot Rhody the Ram	Dayton
Rise & Grind	—		Lubbock
Shell Shock	Maryland alumni	Maryland Terrapins school mascot	Louisville
Show Me Squad	Missouri alumni	Missouri state nickname "Show Me State"	Wichita 1
Sideline Cancer	—	Pancreatic cancer awareness	West Virginia
Team Arkansas	Arkansas alumni		Wichita 2
Team Colorado	Colorado alumni		Dayton
Team DRC	Dominique Rodgers-Cromartie		Xavier
Team Gibson	—	Team sponsor Taj Gibson	Syracuse
Team Overtime	Overtime	Team sponsor Overtime, a sports media company	Dayton
The Ville	Louisville alumni	City nickname	Louisville
Vegas Rebellion	UNLV alumni	Vegas Rebels school mascot	Wichita 1
Virginia Dream	—	Players with connections to the state of Virginia	Syracuse
War Ready	Auburn alumni	School battle cry "War Eagle"	Louisville
We Are D3	NCAA Division III alumni		Wichita 1
Zip Em Up	Xavier alumni	Former Xavier team motto	Xavier
Zoo Crew	Pittsburgh alumni	Oakland Zoo student section	West Virginia

Note: team names are per the TBT bracket; some names have slight variation on TBT website pages.

== Tournament bracket ==
Seven of the eight no. 1 seeds advanced in first-round play, with no. 8 India Rising upsetting Red Scare in the Dayton Regional.

Five no. 1 seeds advanced in second-round play; the lowest seed to advance to the third round was no 6. Nasti Nati from the Dayton Regional.

Two no. 1 seeds advanced in third-round play; the lowest seed to advance to the quarterfinals was again Nasti Nati.

No no. 1 seeds won a quarterfinal match; the lowest seed to advance to the semifinals was no 4. Herd That from the West Virginia Regional.

In the first semifinal game, Herd That were eliminated by Heartfire, the no. 2 seed from the Wichita 1 Regional.

In the second semifinal game, Friday Beers were eliminated by Bleed Green, the no. 2 seed from the Lubbock Regional.

Heartfire then defeated Bleed Green in the championship game.

=== Lubbock Regional – United Supermarkets Arena ===
First Round; July 19
1	Air Raiders	83
8	Purple Hearts	64
4	The Enchantment	77
5	Austin's Own	66
3	HBCUnited	58
6	In The Lab	88
2	Bleed Green	94
7	Rise & Grind	78

Second Round; July 21
1	Air Raiders	67
4	The Enchantment	84
6	In The Lab	72
2	Bleed Green	83

Third Round; July 23
4	The Enchantment	57
2	Bleed Green	70

=== Wichita 1 Regional – Charles Koch Arena ===
First Round; July 19
1	Mass Street	70
8	We Are D3	67
4	Show Me Squad	96
5	Vegas Rebellion	90
3	LA Cheaters	86
6	Living The Dream	72
2	Heartfire	69
7	JUCO Products	66

Second Round; July 22
1	Mass Street	69
4	Show Me Squad	65
3	LA Cheaters	57
2	Heartfire	62

Third Round; July 23
1	Mass Street	60
2	Heartfire	73

=== Wichita 2 Regional – Charles Koch Arena ===
First Round; July 20
1	AfterShocks	66
8	B1 Ballers	54
4	Beale Street Boys	73
5	Broad Street Birds	67
3	Team Arkansas	70
6	Ram Up	58
2	Purple & Black	72
7	DaGuys STL	59

Second Round; July 21
1	AfterShocks	73
4	Beale Street Boys	69
3	Team Arkansas	63
2	Purple & Black	52

Third Round; July 23
1	AfterShocks	63
3	Team Arkansas	59

=== Xavier Regional – Cintas Center (Cincinnati) ===
First Round; July 21
1	Program for Autism	91
8	Team DRC	76
4	Bucketneers	52
5	Fort Wayne Champs	85
3	The Money Team	76
6	Nasty Nati	88
2	Zip Em Up	84
7	Georgia Kingz	78

Second Round; July 22
1	Program for Autism	86
5	Fort Wayne Champs	74
6	Nasty Nati	77
2	Zip Em Up	73

Third Round; July 24
1	Program for Autism	51
6	Nasty Nati	76

=== Syracuse Regional – The Oncenter ===
First Round; July 24
1	Blue Collar U	78
8	Big 5	77
4	Virginia Dream	79
5	The Commonwealth	73
3	The Nerd Team	54
6	Happy Valley Hoopers	49
2	Boeheim's Army	99
7	Team Gibson	83

Second Round; July 26
1	Blue Collar U	107
4	Virginia Dream	86
3	The Nerd Team	75
2	Boeheim's Army	83

Third Round; July 28
1	Blue Collar U	54
2	Boeheim's Army	69

=== Louisville Regional – Freedom Hall ===
First Round; July 25
1	Gutter Cats	77
8	The Nawf	72
4	Shell Shock	77
5	Gataverse	74
3	Eberlein Drive	68
6	Jackson TN Underdawgs	88
2	The Ville	91
7	War Ready	67

Second Round; July 27
1	Gutter Cats	71
4	Shell Shock	57
6	Jackson TN Underdawgs	74
2	The Ville	79

Third Round; July 29
1	Gutter Cats	64
2	The Ville	62

=== West Virginia Regional – WesBanco Arena (Wheeling) ===
First Round; July 25
1	Best Virginia	70
8	Dubois Dream	68
4	Herd That	86
5	Zoo Crew	71
3	Challenge ALS: Florida	95
6	Dawg Town	66
2	Sideline Cancer	83
7	Ram Nation	72

Second Round; July 27
1	Best Virginia	61
4	Herd That	74
3	Challenge ALS: Florida	51
2	Sideline Cancer	60

Third Round; July 29
4	Herd That	73
2	Sideline Cancer	64

=== Dayton Regional – UD Arena ===
First Round; July 26
1	Red Scare	67
8	India Rising	77
4	Carmen's Crew	80
5	Team Overtime	68
3	Team Colorado	68
6	Men of Mackey	70
2	Friday Beers	84
7	Athletics Miami	72

Second Round; July 28
8	India Rising	56
4	Carmen's Crew	82
6	Men of Mackey	68
2	Friday Beers	73

Third Round; July 29
4	Carmen's Crew	63
2	Friday Beers	72

=== Championship Week ===
Quarterfinals games were played at Wichita, West Virginia, Dayton, and Louisville. All semifinal and championship games were played in Philadelphia.

Quarterfinals; July 25–31
W1 2	Heartfire	76
W2 1	Aftershocks	53
SY 2	Boeheim's Army	71
WV 4	Herd That	88
XV 6	Nasty Nati	66
DY 2	Friday Beers	72
LB 2	Bleed Green	72
LV 1	Gutter Cats	61

Semifinals; August 2
W1 2	Heartfire	73
WV 4	Herd That	68
DY 2	Friday Beers	65
LB 2	Bleed Green	68

Championship; August 3
W1 2	Heartfire	78
LB 2	Bleed Green	73

Eric Collins, Fran Fraschilla, and Ashley ShaAhmadi were the announcers for both semifinal matches and the championship game.

==== Semifinals ====
ESPN

August 2, 2023
7:00 p.m. EDT

Stats, Recap

W1 2 Heartfire 73, WV 4 Herd That 68
Scoring by quarter: 9–16, 25–12, 26–17, 13–23
Pts: T. Mack, R. Putney 14; Rebs: R. Solomon, E. Griffin 8 Asts: R. Putney 3	Pts: J. Tokoto 27; Rebs: J. Tokoto 9 Asts: J. Elmore 5

Daskalakis Athletic Center
Philadelphia, Pennsylvania

ESPN3

August 2, 2023
9:00 p.m. EDT

Stats, Recap

DY 1 Friday Beers 65, LB 2 Bleed Green 68
Scoring by quarter: 17–14, 12–19, 15–19, 21–16
Pts: J. Gamble 20; Rebs: J. Gamble 13; Asts: D. Bost 5	Pts: J. Stevens 18; Rebs: T. Bell, B. Reed 4 Asts: B. Jefferson 7

Daskalakis Athletic Center
Philadelphia, Pennsylvania

==== Championship ====
ESPN3

August 3, 2023
7:00 p.m. EDT

Stats Recap

W1 2 Heartfire 78, LB 2 Bleed Green 73
Scoring by quarter: 21–18, 26–16, 15–20, 16–19
Pts: E. Griffin 23; Rebs: C. Sword, E. Griffin 7 Asts: R. Putney 3	Pts: K. Huntsberry 23; Rebs: T. Bell 8 Asts: B. Jefferson, T. Bell 5

Daskalakis Athletic Center
Philadelphia, Pennsylvania

== Awards ==
All Tournament Team
Pos	Player	Team
PG	Jordan Stevens	Bleed Green
PG	Jon Elmore	Herd That
SG	Jarron Cumberland	Nasti Nati
PG	Marcus Hall	Heartfire
PF	Julian Gamble	Friday Beers
Coach	LaPhonso Ellis	Heartfire
GM	AJ Mahar	Friday Beers
