= The Basketball Tournament 2026 =

Single elimination basketball tournament

The Basketball Tournament
- 2026

Tournament information
- Sport: Basketball
- Location: Las Vegas; Home court sites; Championship site: Memorial Coliseum Lexington, Kentucky
- Dates: July 18, 2026–August 2, 2026
- Established: 2014
- Administrator: Jonathan Mugar
- Tournament formats: Best of three; Single elimination; Round robin
- Participants: 14 teams
- Defending champions: AfterShocks
- Purse: US$2,000,000 winner-take-all

Final positions
- Champions: Davis Steel
- Runner-up: La Familia

Tournament statistics
- MVP: Gabe York
- Games played: 26

The Basketball Tournament 2026 was the thirteenth edition of The Basketball Tournament (TBT), a 5-on-5, basketball tournament with a $2 million winner-take-all prize. The tournament, involving 14 teams, began on July 18 and ended on August 2. Twenty games were broadcast live on FOX, FS1, and FS2. Other games were streamed on YouTube.

Kentucky alumni team La Familia won the alumni bracket and hosted the non-alumni champion, Davis Steel on their home court Memorial Coliseum in Lexington, Kentucky. Davis Steel won the tournament 67–59, claiming the $2 million prize for the first time since competing in 13 tournaments.

== Format ==
The tournament featured a bracket for the eight alumni teams. The first round was a best of three series and the remaining rounds a standard single elimination format. The teams and the bracket placements for alumni entrants were revealed on May 21, 2026. The non-alumni teams were divided into two 3-team groups for round robin play, then seeded into a single-elimination bracket.

Alumni rounds were played at campus sites around the country with most teams hosting at least one game. The non-alumni rounds took place at M Resort Spa Casino in Las Vegas. The alumni and non-alumni semifinal winners faced each other in the championship round at the alumni champion's home court.

As with previous years, all tournament games operate with the "Elam Ending", a format of ending the game without use of a game clock. Under the Elam Ending, the clock is turned off at the first dead-ball whistle with four minutes or less to play in the game. At that time, a target score, equal to the score of the leading team (or tied teams) plus eight, is set, and the first team to reach this target score is declared the winner of the game. Thus, all games end on a made basket (field goal or free throw) and there is no overtime.

== Venues ==
- Bramlage Coliseum, Manhattan, Kansas (Purple Reign)
- Charles Koch Arena, Wichita, Kansas (AfterShocks)
- Freedom Hall, Louisville, Kentucky (The Ville)
- Lee Arena, Topeka, Kansas (JHX Hoops)
- M Resort Spa Casino, Las Vegas, Nevada (Non-alumni games)
- Memorial Coliseum, Lexington, Kentucky (La Familia)
- The Oncenter, Syracuse, New York (Boeheim's Army)
- Walsh Gymnasium, South Orange, New Jersey (Hall In)

== Teams ==
TBT has a history of teams rostered primarily with alumni from specific NCAA Division I college basketball programs; 8 such teams entered the 2026 tournament.

Alumni teams
| Name | College affiliation | Source of team name |
|---|---|---|
| AfterShocks | Wichita State alumni | Wichita State Shockers school nickname |
| Boeheim's Army | Syracuse alumni | Former Syracuse head coach Jim Boeheim |
| The Enchantment | New Mexico alumni | "The Land of Enchantment" official nickname for New Mexico |
| Hall In | Seton Hall alumni | Play on the phrase "all in" using the university's name |
| JHX Hoops | Kansas alumni | Variation of the Kansas Jayhawks mascot name |
| La Familia | Kentucky alumni | 2009-24 Kentucky coach John Calipari's Italian heritage; also name of a UK basketball NIL collective |
| Purple Reign | Kansas State alumni | Kansas State University school colors |
| The Ville | Louisville alumni | City nickname |

Non-alumni teams
| Name | Sponsor affiliation | Source of team name |
|---|---|---|
| Knueppel Crew | | Kon Knueppel and his father |
| Heartfire Elite | Airo | Combination of previous teams Heartfire, Elite Nation, and The Shine |
| Davis Steel (Note: partnership of previous team Eberlein Drive and Davis Sports Corp.) | Owners Ashley & Adam Davis | Davis tubing and fencing company |
| Gotham City Bockers | Founder Philip B. McDonald, M.D. | Nicknames of New York City and another form of New York Knickerbockers |
| The Mecca | Long Beach, California | |
| Red Rose War Ready | Porter's Pool & Spa, Ripley, WV | Combination of previous teams Red Rose Thunder and War Ready |

== Alumni bracket ==
Round 1 (best of 3); July 18–24, FOX/FS1/FS2
The Ville | 68 | 82 | 57
La Familia | 72 | 62 | 63
Boeheim's Army | 82 | 81
Hall In | 52 | 76
JHX Hoops | 61 | 84 | 62
Purple Reign | 80 | 80 | 55
AfterShocks | 98 | 68 | 73
The Enchantment | 77 | 74 | 67

Quarterfinals; July 26–27, FOX/FS1
La Familia | 70
Boeheim's Army | 66
JHX Hoops | 64
AfterShocks | 59

Semiinals; July 29, FS1
La Familia | 78
JHX Hoops | 65

== Non-alumni groups ==
| | Group A | DVS | KCW | GCB |
| 1 | Davis Steel (2–0) | | 86–59 | 79–76 |
| 2 | Knueppel Crew (1–1) | 59–86 | | 77–64 |
| 3 | Gotham City Bockers (0–2) | 76–79 | 64–77 | |

| | Group B | HRT | RED | MEC |
| 1 | Heartfire Elite (1–1) | | 72–75 | 90–84 |
| 2 | Red Rose War Ready (1–1) | 75–72 | | 64–68 |
| 3 | The Mecca (1–1) | 84–90 | 68–64 | |

After group play, the teams were seeded in a 6-team single game elimination bracket with the top seeds getting a bye for the first round.

Round 1 knockout July 26–27, FS1
A3 | Gotham City Bockers | 63
B2 | Red Rose War Ready | 65
A2 | Knueppel Crew | 69
B3 | The Mecca | 76

Round 2 knockout July 28, FS1
A1 | Davis Steel | 83
B2 | Red Rose War Ready | 67
B1 | Heartfire Elite | 80
B3 | The Mecca | 84

Round 3 knockout July 30, FS1
A1 | Davis Steel | 71
B3 | The Mecca | 69

== Semifinals ==
FS1

July 29, 2026
7:00 p.m. EDT

Stats

JHX Hoops 65, La Familia 78
Scoring by quarter: 10–15, 20–22, 7–21, 28–20
| Pts: B. Preston 15; Rebs: B. Preston 9 Asts: F. Mason III 3 EE: 12 | Pts: A. Goodwin 28; Rebs: C. Coffey 8 Asts: A. Goodwin, D. Morsell 3 EE: 9 |
Alumni bracket championship

Memorial Coliseum
Lexington, Kentucky

FS1

July 30, 2026
4:00 p.m. PDT

Stats

Davis Steel 71, The Mecca 69
Scoring by quarter: 21–12, 20–18, 16–24, 14–15
| Pts: G. York 16; Rebs: Nate Watson, G. York 5 Asts: G. York 6 EE: 8 | Pts: C. Ware 20; Rebs: T. Carter 8 Asts: L. Peters 3 EE: 7 |
Non-alumni bracket championship

M Resort
Las Vegas, Nevada

== Championship ==
FOX

August 2, 2026
1:00 p.m. EDT

Stats

Davis Steel 67, La Familia 59
Scoring by quarter: 17–9, 15–17, 20–14, 15–19
| Pts: T. Taylor 24; Rebs: N. Watson 10; Asts: A. Clemmons, G. York 4 EE: 8 | Pts: A. Goodwin 19; Rebs: W. Cauley-Stein 13; Asts: D. Morsell 5 EE: 12 |
Tournament championship

Memorial Coliseum
Lexington, Kentucky

== Awards ==
All Tournament Team
| Pos | Player | Team |
|---|---|---|
| SG | Gabe York | Davis Steel |
| PG | Archie Goodwin | La Familia |
| C | Willie Cauley-Stein | La Familia |
| PG | Zeke Mayo | JHX Hoops |
| SG | Marvelle Harris | The Mecca |
| Coach | Jon Hood | La Familia |
| GM | Stephen Almquist | The Mecca |
