= The Basketball Tournament =

American basketball tournament since 2014

- Current season, competition or edition: The Basketball Tournament 2026
- Sport: Basketball
- Founded: 2014
- Founder: Jonathan Mugar
- No. of teams: 14 (2026)
- Countries: United States
- Most recent champion: Davis Steel (2026)
- Most titles: Overseas Elite (4)
- Broadcaster: Fox Sports
- Tournament format: Single-elimination
- Website: thetournament.com

The Basketball Tournament (TBT) is an open-invitation tournament played each summer in the United States, with the stakes being a cash prize (the most recent tournament in 2026 had a $2 million purse going to the winners). The number of teams playing in the tournament has varied since its establishment, but in recent years has settled into a 64-team field.

The event was founded in 2014 by real estate developer and TV producer Jonathan Mugar, and as of 2025, the tournament airs in the U.S. on Fox and its sister network Fox Sports 1 (FS1).

== Format ==
Teams in TBT are arranged by the general manager, sometimes based on which college basketball program the players competed for. The tournament has had as many as 97 teams, in 2015, and as few as 14 teams, in 2026. Since 2016, the tournament has most often used a 64-team field. In 2019, the 64 teams were divided into eight regions, with each regional winner advancing to the championship venue. In 2020, the tournament field was reduced to 24 teams with all games played at a single venue, due to the COVID-19 pandemic in the United States. In 2021, the 64 teams were organized into four regions, with each region's top two teams advancing to the championship venue. The 2022 event returned to the former eight-region format, with the eight regional winners advancing to what TBT organizers call "Championship Week", with quarterfinals at two sites followed by semifinals and the final at the championship venue. The 2026 tournament divided teams into alumni and non-alumni groups. The 8-team alumni bracket was a best-of-3 series for the first round, followed by single elimination rounds for the remainder. The 6-team non-alumni competition consisted of round robin play to seed two groups into a single elimination bracket. The final champion will be determined by a single game played between the alumni and non-alumni winners at the alumni team's home court.

The championship prize money was originally $500,000 in 2014, was increased to $1 million in 2015, and was $2 million from 2016 through 2019, and again in 2026. From 2020 to 2025, the top prize has been $1 million. The prize money goes to the winning team's personnel. There are also prizes for the top 1,000 bracket entries submitted by fans that score the most points through their picks, on a deescalating scale starting at $4,000 for the winner. The 2019 tournament included prizes other than the overall winner-take-all purse; each regional winner received 25% of its region's ticket proceeds.

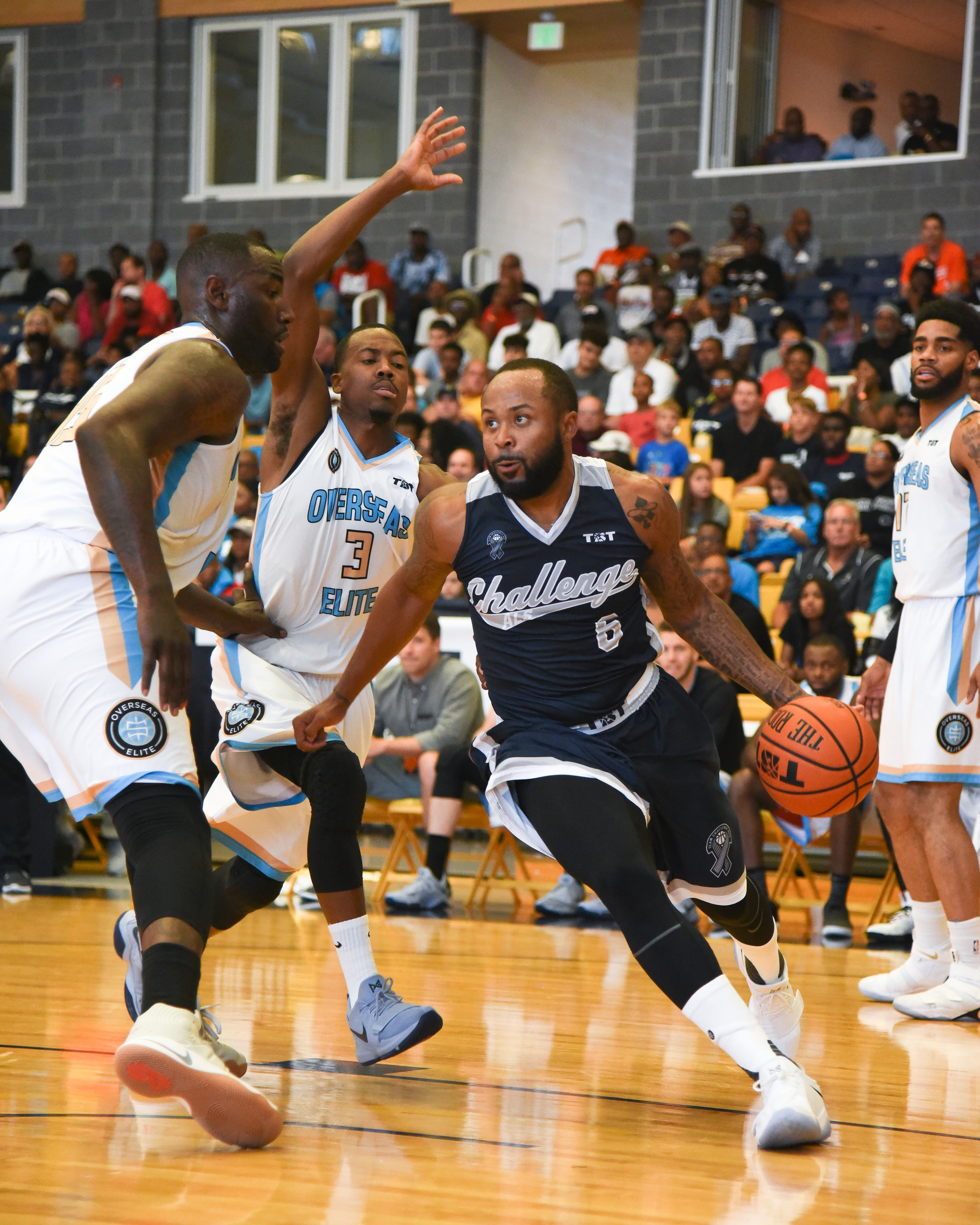
Overseas Elite (in white) during the 2017 title game

Tournament field by year
| Year | Field size (teams) | Finals location | Winner's prize |
|---|---|---|---|
| 2014 | 32 | Boston, MA | $500,000 |
| 2015 | 97 † | Bronx, NY | $1,000,000 |
| 2016 | 64 | Bronx, NY | $2,000,000 |
| 2017 | 64 ‡ | Baltimore, MD | $2,000,000 |
| 2018 | 72 | Baltimore, MD | $2,000,000 |
| 2019 | 64 | Chicago, IL | $2,000,000 |
| 2020 | 24 | Columbus, OH | $1,000,000 |
| 2021 | 64 | Dayton, OH | $1,000,000 |
| 2022 | 64 | Dayton, OH | $1,000,000 |
| 2023 | 64 | Philadelphia, PA | $1,000,000 |
| 2024 | 64 | Philadelphia, PA | $1,000,000 |
| 2025 | 61 | Wichita, KS | $1,000,000 |
| 2026 | 14 | Lexington, KY | $2,000,000 |

† Defending champion received a play-in to the round-of-16
‡ Four teams in the field of 64 select via a 16-team two-round play-in

=== Rules ===
TBT uses a modified version of NCAA men's basketball rules. As of the 2019 edition, the most significant exceptions were:

- Games are played in 9-minute quarters instead of 20-minute halves (or the 10-minute quarters of the NCAA women's game).
- Players foul out upon their 6th personal foul (instead of 5th).
- Bonus free throws follow NCAA women's and FIBA rules, with two free throws on the 5th and subsequent non-shooting fouls by the defense in a quarter. An exception to this rule was added starting with the 2020 tournament; any foul during the Elam Ending (see below) that would result in bonus free throws will instead give the non-fouling team one free throw and possession of the ball. This change is intended to reduce the number of games ending on free throws.
- FIBA rules on basket interference are followed, except on free throws. Once the ball hits the rim on a field goal attempt, any player on either team can play the ball, regardless of the direction in which it is moving or its position relative to the basket. The only exception is that no player on either team may touch a shot that was in the air at the time the game clock expired for any quarter, even if the ball has touched the rim, as long as it has a chance to enter the basket.
- Replay review is governed by NCAA rules, with one modification—any review allowed only in the last two minutes of a game under NCAA rules is allowed in TBT only if either team is within three points of the Elam Ending target score.
- Due to the adoption of the Elam Ending for all games, there is no overtime.

== Players ==
TBT has had a number of current and former NBA players participate, including Hakim Warrick, Jason Williams, Dahntay Jones, Mike Bibby, Royal Ivey, Matt Bonner, Jimmer Fredette, and Brian Scalabrine. Former WNBA player Nikki Teasley played in the 2014 tournament. The 2018 tournament included the basketball return of Greg Oden, who last played in the Chinese Basketball Association during their 2015–16 season. The 2019 tournament had been expected to be the first to feature an active female professional. Megan Gustafson, who had been cut by the Dallas Wings before the 2019 WNBA season, was slated to play for Iowa United, a team made up primarily of alumni of the state's four NCAA Division I schools. However, due to a rash of early-season injuries on the team, the Wings re-signed her in mid-June, ruling her out of TBT.

Many teams feature professional players reunited under a former college or university name, with teams representing Arkansas, Bellarmine, Bradley, Buffalo, Cincinnati, Dayton, Georgetown, Gonzaga, Iowa State, Kansas, Kansas State, Kentucky, Louisville, Marquette, Miami, Marshall, Milwaukee, New Mexico, North Texas, Notre Dame, Ohio State, Purdue, Seton Hall, Syracuse, Texas Tech, UCLA, VCU, West Virginia, Wichita State, Xavier and many others. Teams have received fan support from active NBA players such as Kyle Lowry and Obi Toppin. Six alumni teams have won TBT—Buffalo, Marquette, Notre Dame, Ohio State, Syracuse, and Wichita State..

In 2016, NBA players such as John Wall, Kristaps Porzingis, Rudy Gay, Shaun Livingston, Chandler Parsons, and Austin Rivers served as boosters for different teams. In 2017, Carmelo Anthony acted as host for the tournament in Baltimore, where he played high school basketball. 2019 saw even more NBA involvement, with Chris Paul (Team CP3) and DeMarcus Cousins (Loyalty Is Love) both entering teams, while Bobby Portis and Andre Drummond coached TBT sides.

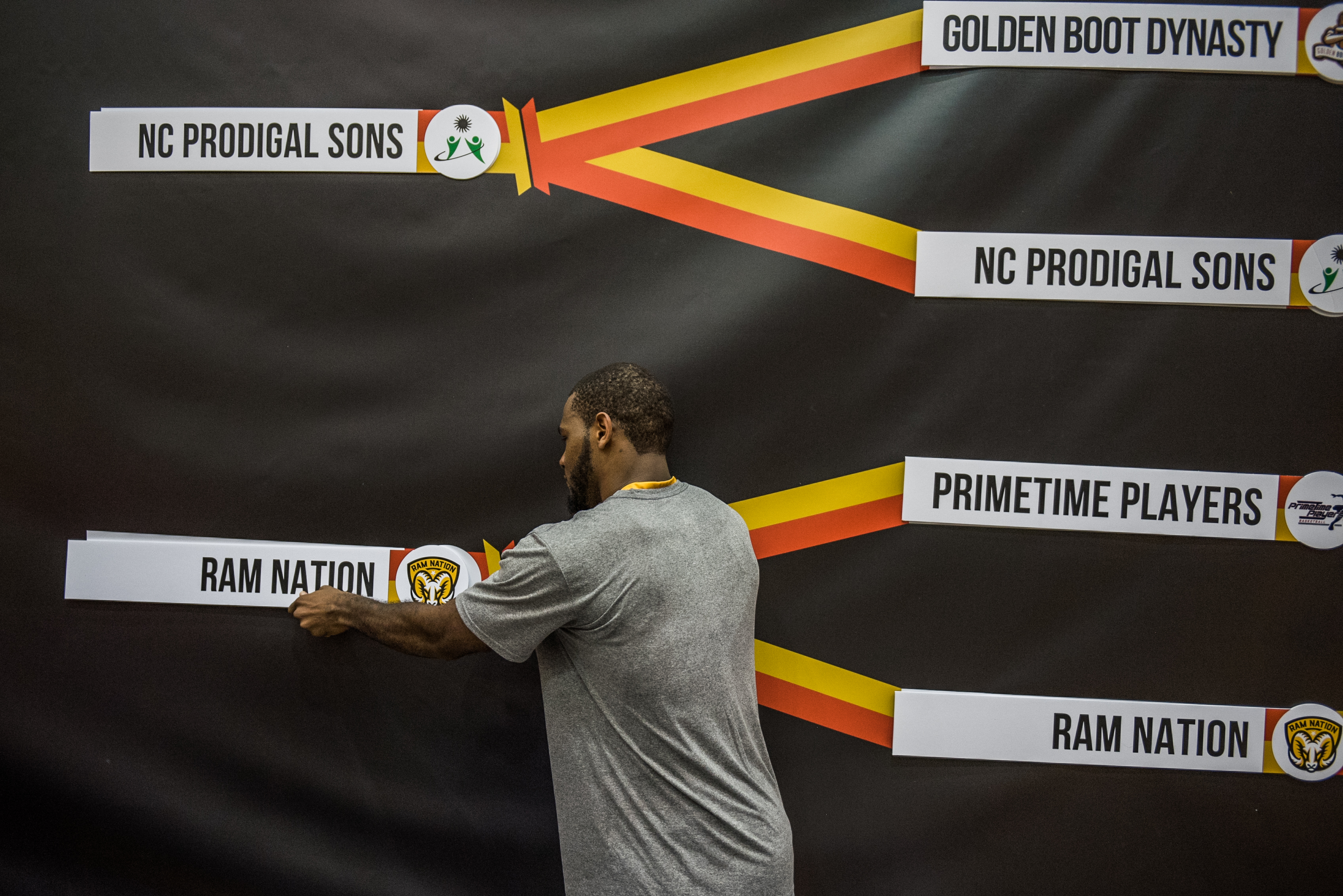
Ram Nation advancing its name on the bracket

== Bracket celebration ==
At the conclusion of each game, the winning team advances its placard on a giant bracket to the next round. The bracket resembles the All Valley Karate Tournament bracket found in The Karate Kid.

After pleas from ESPN analyst Fran Fraschilla, Yahoo Sports columnist Jeff Eisenberg, and SportsCenter host Scott Van Pelt, the NCAA adopted the ritual for March Madness in 2018. After the game, a portable bracket was brought into the winning team's locker room. One player, or a group of players, advanced the team to the next round. Oftentimes, the celebration was posted on social media. The bracket celebration also took place in the Frozen Four of the 2018 NCAA Hockey Tournament.

== Champions ==
On June 28, 2014, Notre Dame Fighting Alumni won the inaugural TBT championship, defeating Team Barstool, 72–68. The winning team, represented by several former Fighting Irish players, including MVP Tyrone Nash, donated $40,000 to Coaches vs. Cancer.

On August 2, 2015, Overseas Elite defeated Team 23, 67–65, to take the second annual TBT title. D. J. Kennedy, who played college basketball for St. John's, was named MVP.

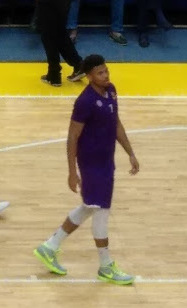
2014 MVP Tyrone Nash

Overseas Elite was able to repeat as TBT champions by defeating Team Colorado, 77–72, on August 2, 2016, to claim the $2 million prize; Arizona alumnus Kyle Fogg was named MVP.

On August 3, 2017, Overseas Elite beat Team Challenge ALS, 86–83, to become three-time TBT champions, with Fogg again being named MVP.

On August 3, 2018, Overseas Elite won their fourth consecutive final, defeating Eberlein Drive, 70–58, with D. J. Kennedy being named MVP for the second time.

The 2019 final was played on August 6 and pitted the Marquette alumni team, Golden Eagles, against Ohio State alumni team Carmen's Crew, who had defeated the reigning four-time champion Overseas Elite to advance to the final. Carmen's Crew went on to defeat Golden Eagles, 66–60. William Buford of Carmen's Crew was named MVP.

The 2020 final, played on July 14 in Columbus, Ohio, matched Golden Eagles, appearing in their second consecutive TBT title game, and Sideline Cancer, defeating Overseas Elite to appear in their first. The game was won by Golden Eagles, 78–73. Darius Johnson-Odom of the Golden Eagles was named MVP.

The 2021 final was held on August 3 in Dayton, Ohio, with Boeheim's Army (Syracuse) defeating Team 23, 69–67; the winning shot was made by Keifer Sykes. Team 23 became the first team to lose two TBT finals. Tyrese Rice of Boeheim's Army was named MVP.

The 2022 final was held on August 2, again in Dayton, between Blue Collar U (Buffalo) and Autism Army. Blue Collar U outscored Autism Army in every quarter and won the game, 89–67. The winning points came on a dunk by Montell McRae. C. J. Massinburg of Blue Collar U was named MVP.

Champions of The Basketball Tournament
| Year | Champion | Score | Runner-up | MVP |
|---|---|---|---|---|
| 2014 | Notre Dame Fighting Alumni | 72–68 | Team Barstool | Tyrone Nash |
| 2015 | Overseas Elite | 67–65 | Team 23 | D. J. Kennedy |
| 2016 | Overseas Elite | 77–72 | Team Colorado | Kyle Fogg |
| 2017 | Overseas Elite | 86–83 | Team Challenge ALS | Kyle Fogg |
| 2018 | Overseas Elite | 70–58 | Eberlein Drive | D. J. Kennedy |
| 2019 | Carmen's Crew | 66–60 | Golden Eagles | William Buford |
| 2020 | Golden Eagles | 78–73 | Sideline Cancer | Darius Johnson-Odom |
| 2021 | Boeheim's Army | 69–67 | Team 23 | Tyrese Rice |
| 2022 | Blue Collar U | 89–67 | Autism Army | C. J. Massinburg |
| 2023 | Heartfire | 78–73 | Bleed Green | Brandon Jefferson |
| 2024 | Carmen's Crew | 69–65 | Forever Coogs | Jared Sullinger |
| 2025 | Aftershocks | 82-67 | Eberlein Drive | Marcus Keene |
| 2026 | Davis Steel | 67-59 | La Familia | Gabe York |

=== Championship game records ===
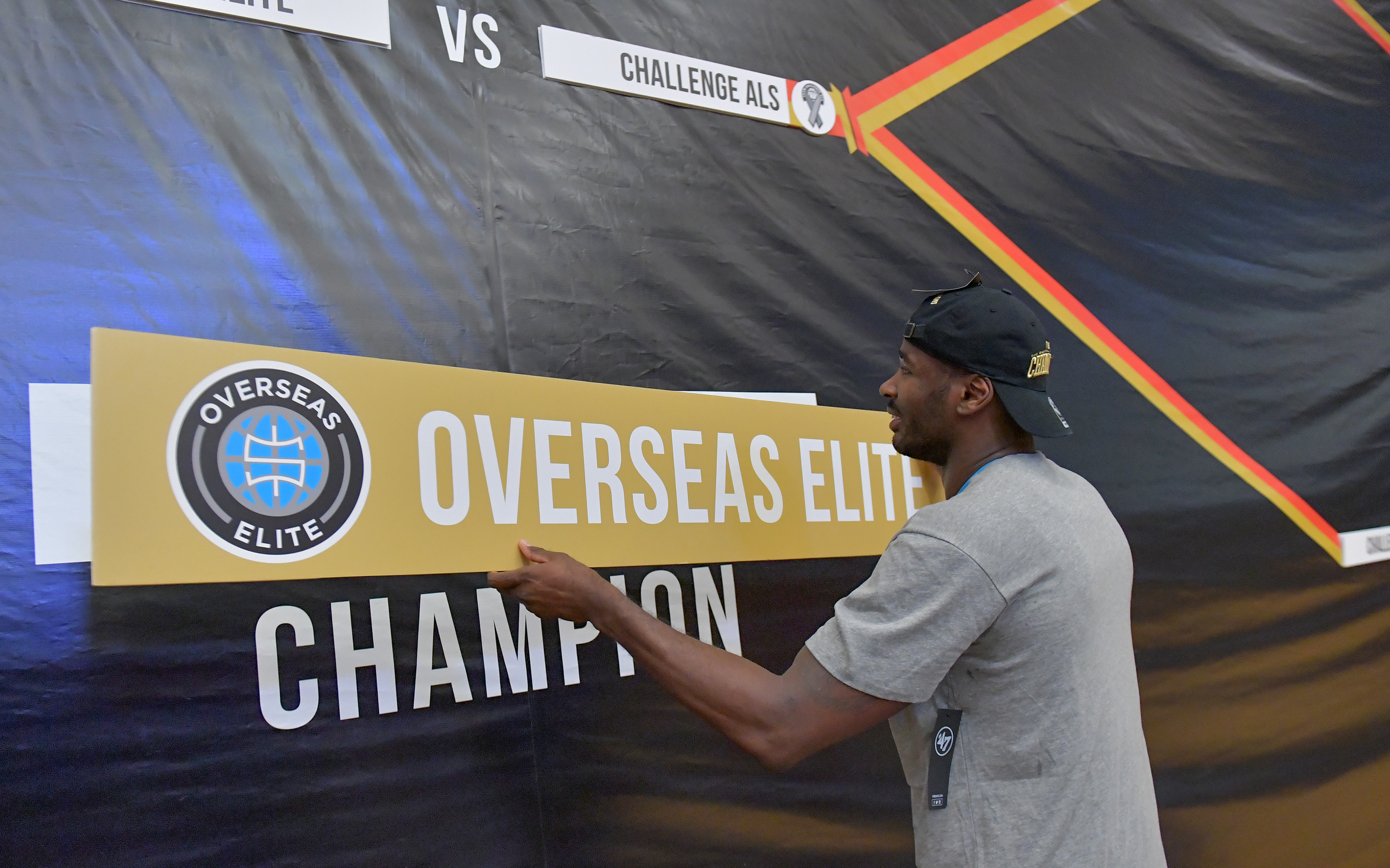
Justin Burrell advancing Overseas Elite's name on the bracket after winning the 2017 championship

Teams are ordered by number of appearances.

Team appearances in The Basketball Tournament championships
| Team | Appearances | Record | Years (won / lost) |
|---|---|---|---|
| Overseas Elite | 4 | 4–0 | 2015, 2016, 2017, 2018 |
| Eberlein Drive | 3 | 1–2 | 2018, 2025, 2026 (Note: as Davis Steel) |
| Heartfire | 3 | 1–2 | 2015, 2021, 2023 |
| Carmen's Crew | 2 | 2–0 | 2019, 2024 |
| Golden Eagles | 2 | 1–1 | 2019, 2020 |
| Aftershocks | 1 | 1–0 | 2025 |
| Blue Collar U | 1 | 1–0 | 2022 |
| Boeheim's Army | 1 | 1–0 | 2021 |
| Notre Dame Fighting Alumni | 1 | 1–0 | 2014 |
| Autism Army | 1 | 0–1 | 2022 |
| Team Barstool | 1 | 0–1 | 2014 |
| Bleed Green | 1 | 0–1 | 2023 |
| Team Challenge ALS | 1 | 0–1 | 2017 |
| Team Colorado | 1 | 0–1 | 2016 |
| Forever Coogs | 1 | 0–1 | 2024 |
| La Familia | 1 | 0–1 | 2026 |
| Sideline Cancer | 1 | 0–1 | 2020 |

== Related venture ==
On October 11, 2022, tournament owner and organizer TBT Enterprises announced that it would extend the TBT concept to soccer, announcing The Soccer Tournament, a 7-on-7 summer tournament that began on schedule in 2023. Like TBT, TST has a winner-take-all prize of $1 million. TST started with 32 teams, with a group phase followed by a 16-team knockout tournament.

Matches are played on a reduced-size field with slightly smaller goals than normal and consist of 20-minute halves. The Elam Ending has been adapted to a soccer setting; after the end of the second half, the remainder of the match consists of "Target Score Time", with the target score being set by adding one goal to the leading (or tied) team's score. The game ends once the target score is reached by either team. If the target is not reached after 5 minutes, one player from each team exits the field, with the process continuing every 5 minutes until each side is reduced to 2 players or the winning goal is scored, whichever comes first.
