= Tyrone Nash =

American basketball player (born 1988)

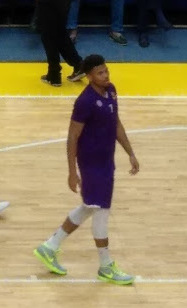
- Nash with Ironi Nahariya in 2018

Free agent
- Position: Power forward

Personal information
- Born: September 24, 1988 (age 38) Queens, New York, U.S.
- Listed height: 6 ft 8 in (2.03 m)
- Listed weight: 232 lb (105 kg)

Career information
- High school: Lawrence Woodmere Academy (Woodmere, New York)
- College: Notre Dame (2007–2011)
- NBA draft: 2011: undrafted
- Playing career: 2011–present

Career history
- 2011–2014: Walter Tigers Tübingen
- 2015: SPO Rouen Basket
- 2015: Leones de Santo Domingo
- 2015–2016: Löwen Braunschweig
- 2016–2017: Ironi Nahariya
- 2017: Akhisar Belediyespor
- 2017–2018: Ironi Nahariya
- 2018: BC Prienai
- 2018–2019: Rasta Vechta
- 2021: CD Valdivia
- 2021–2022: Rasta Vechta

Tyrone Sidney Nash (born September 24, 1988) is an American professional basketball player who last played for Rasta Vechta of the German ProA. He played college basketball for the University of Notre Dame before playing professionally in Germany, France, Dominican Republic, Israel, Turkey and Lithuania.

== Early life and college career ==
Nash attended Lawrence Woodmere Academy in Woodmere, New York, where he averaged 17 points, 14 rebounds, 5 assists and 3 blocks during his senior season. Nash helped lead his team to three consecutive regional championships during his sophomore, junior and senior campaigns and earned All-Long Island first-team honors.

Nash played college basketball for University of Notre Dame's Fighting Irish, where he averaged 9.5 points and 5.9 rebounds and 2.6 assists per game in his senior year.

== Professional career ==
=== Tübingen (2011–2014) ===
Nash went undrafted in the 2011 NBA draft. On July 6, 2011, Nash signed with the German team Walter Tigers Tübingen for the 2011–2012 season. That season, on March 21, 2012, Nash signed a two-year contract extension with Tübingen. In his second season with the team, Nash participated in the 2013 BBL Slam Dunk Contest.

=== Rouen (2014–2015) ===
On June 22, 2014, Nash signed with the French team SPO Rouen Basket for the 2014–2015 season, alongside his former teammate Daequan Cook. However, on August 24, 2014, he parted ways with Rouen due to a leg injury that occurred while playing for the New Orleans Pelicans in the 2014 NBA Summer League. On January 19, 2015, Nash returned to Rouen for the remainder of the season.

=== Braunschweig (2015–2016) ===
On August 10, 2015, Nash returned to Germany for a second stint, signing with Löwen Braunschweig for the 2015–2016 season. On December 6, 2015, Nash recorded a season-high 26 points, shooting 9-of-12 from the field, along with eight rebounds in 90–83 win over Mitteldeutscher.

=== Ironi Nahariya (2016–2017) ===
On September 15, 2016, Nash signed with the Israeli team Ironi Nahariya for the 2016–17 season. On April 9, 2017, Nash recorded a career-high 28 points, shooting 12-of-13 from the field, along with seven rebounds, four assists and two steals in a 105–80 blowout win over Hapoel Tel Aviv. Nash helped Nahariya reach the 2017 FIBA Europe Cup Quarterfinals, as well as reaching the 2017 Israeli League Quarterfinals, where they eventually lost to Hapoel Jerusalem 2–3 in a playoff series.

=== Akhisar Belediyespor (2017) ===
On July 4, 2017, Nash signed with the Turkish team Akhisar Belediyespor for the 2017–18 season. In November 2017, he parted ways with the team after appearing in five league games.

=== Return to Nahariya (2017–2018) ===
On November 10, 2017, Nash returned to Ironi Nahariya for a second stint, signing for the rest of the 2017–18 season.

=== Prienai (2018) ===
On October 29, 2018, Nash signed a one-year deal with BC Prienai of the Lithuanian Basketball League. In December 2018, he parted ways with Prienai after appearing in two league games.

=== Rasta Vechta (2018–2019) ===
On December 8, 2019, Nash signed with Rasta Vechta for the rest of the season. In 18 games played for Rasta Vechta, he finished the season as the league third-leading in field goal percentage (70.8), along with 10 points and 5.1 rebounds per game. Nash helped Rasta Vechta reach the 2019 BBL Playoffs as the fourth seed, but they eventually were eliminated by Bayern Munich in the Semifinals.

=== CD Valdivia (2021) ===
On January 9, 2021, he has signed with CD Valdivia of the LNB Chile.

=== Return to Rasta Vechta (2021–2022) ===
On October 14, 2021, he has signed second time with Rasta Vechta of the German ProA.

== The Basketball Tournament ==
Nash was a member of the Notre Dame Fighting Alumni team that competed in the inaugural The Basketball Tournament, a winner-take-all competition, winning the 2014 tournament, with Nash being named MVP.

In TBT 2018, Nash suited up for Team Sons of Westwood. In three games, he averaged 11.0 points per game and 5.7 rebounds per game on 83 percent shooting. Team Sons of Westwood ALS made it to the Super 16 before falling to Team Challenge ALS.

== Career statistics ==
Legend
GP	Games played	MPG	Minutes per game	FG%	Field goal percentage
3P%	3-point field goal percentage	FT%	Free throw percentage	RPG	Rebounds per game
APG	Assists per game	SPG	Steals per game	BPG	Blocks per game
PPG	Points per game	**Bold**	Career high		Led the league

=== Domestic Leagues ===
Year	Team	League	GP	MPG	FG%	3P%	FT%	RPG	APG	SPG	BPG	PPG
2011–12	(Germany) Tübingen	BBL	34	27.1	.509	.316	.566	5.0	1.3	.8	**.4**	9.0
2012–13	(Germany) Tübingen	BBL	32	28.1	.557	.289	.642	5.3	1.3	.7	.3	10.7
2013–14	(Germany) Tübingen	BBL	33	28.7	.447	.306	**.679**	5.4	1.9	**1.1**	**.4**	10.5
2015	(France) Rouen	Pro A	11	28.5	.507	.0	.500	5.9	1.7	1.0	.1	8.2
2015–16	(Germany) Braunschweig	BBL	34	**29.2**	.550	.240	.667	6.1	**2.1**	.9	.2	**10.8**
2016–17	(Israel) Nahariya	IPL	**37**	21.5	.588	.306	.533	4.5	1.2	.6	.1	7.9
2017	(Turkey) Belediyespor	TBL	5	24.9	.594	**.333**	.500	3.2	1.0	.4	.2	8.8
2017–18	(Israel) Nahariya	IPL	28	26.9	.580	.0	.618	**6.5**	.8	.7	.3	8.6
2018	(Lithuania) Prienai	LKL	2	4.8	**1.000**	.0	.500	1.0	.5	.5	.0	2.5
2018–19	(Germany) Rasta Vechta	BBL	18	23.3	.667	.273	.568	5.1	1.2	.7	.1	10.0

Source: RealGM
