= The Basketball Tournament 2015 =

The Basketball Tournament
- 2015

Tournament information
- Dates: July 10–August 2, 2015
- Tournament format: Single elimination
- Hosts: (California) Los Angeles, CA; (Georgia (U.S. state)) Atlanta, GA; (Pennsylvania) Philadelphia, PA; (Illinois) Chicago, IL; (New York (state)) New York, NY
- Participants: 97
- Purse: $1,000,000 winner-take-all

Final positions
- Champions: Overseas Elite
- Runner-up: Team 23

Tournament statistics
- MVP: D. J. Kennedy
- Top scorer: Davin White (170 pts)
- Games played: 88 (plus 8 walkovers)

The Basketball Tournament 2015 was the second edition of The Basketball Tournament, a 5-on-5, single elimination basketball tournament. The tournament involved 97 teams; it started on July 10 and continued through August 2, 2015. The winner of the final, Overseas Elite, received a one million dollar prize. The semifinals and championship game, played at Rose Hill Gymnasium at Fordham University in The Bronx, were broadcast on ESPN. The tournament was branded as "The Basketball Tournament Presented by Jack Link's Jerky".

== Format ==
The main tournament field started with 96 teams, organized into four regions of 24 teams each. The 24 teams in each region were 18 teams selected by fans via the tournament's website and six teams selected at-large. Four teams from each region, plus 2014 tournament defending champion Notre Dame Fighting Alumni, qualified to advance to the "Super 17" in Chicago.

The winning team (its players, coaches, general manager, and boosters) received 95% of the $1 million prize, while the remaining 5% was split amongst the team's top 91 fans (based on how many friends they had join the tournament's website).

An online bracket contest awarded $1717 to one fan.

== Venues ==
The Basketball Tournament 2015 took place in five locations.

Round	Dates	Region	Location
Regional	July 10–12	West	Los Angeles, California
Regional	July 10–12	South	Atlanta, Georgia
Regional	July 17–19	Northeast	Philadelphia, Pennsylvania
Regional	July 17–19	Midwest	Chicago, Illinois
Super 17 †	July 23–24		Chicago, Illinois
Quarterfinals	July 25		Chicago, Illinois
Semifinals	August 1		New York City
Finals	August 2		New York City

† 2014 champion Notre Dame Fighting Alumni faced the Midwest's lowest remaining seed on July 23; that game's winner, plus the other 15 regional qualifiers, all played on July 24

== Bracket ==
Key
FW	Forfeit win
FL	Forfeit loss

Eight teams in each region received a first-round bye, based on online fan votes.

=== Midwest regional ===
First round Chicago; July 17
1	SLAM	FW
24	New England Falcons	FL
8	IL Hoopville Warriors	141
23	Team Mennonite Madness	47
15	Minnesota Rangers	92
18	Chicago Elite	103
12	Chi United	107
21	DFW Squad	62
13	Sconnie Legends	114
20	The Monarchs	76
14	Midwest Dream Squad	FW
19	Bowling Green Bandits	FL
11	Houston Live	140
22	Brick Squad	72
16	BG Taskforce	109
17	Kenosha Ballers	89

Second round Chicago; July 18
1	SLAM	65
10	One Chicago	82
8	IL Hoopville Warriors	90
9	Team Mill Rats	84
3	Armored Athlete	98
18	Chicago Elite	86
6	Reach 1 Teach 1	112
12	Chi United	103
5	Eberlein Drive	95
13	Sconnie Legends	101
4	Bad Boys	87
14	Midwest Dream Squad	99
7	Majerus SLU Crew	80
11	Houston Live	84
2	Ants Alumni	89
16	BG Taskforce	63

Third round Chicago; July 19
10	One Chicago	63
8	IL Hoopville Warriors	69
3	Armored Athlete	91
6	Reach 1 Teach 1	73
13	Sconnie Legends	74
14	Midwest Dream Squad	82
11	Houston Live	81
2	Ants Alumni	92

Super 17; Chicago; July 24
8	IL Hoopville Warriors	91
3	Armored Athlete	96
†	ND Fighting Alumni	91(OT)
2	Ants Alumni	96

Regional final Chicago; July 25
3	Armored Athlete	72
2	Ants Alumni	76

† The 2014 champions, Notre Dame Fighting Alumni, earned an automatic entry in the "Super 17" round, where they faced the lowest remaining seed in the Midwest region, Midwest Dream Squad, on July 23. Notre Dame Fighting Alumni won that game, 79–77, thus advancing in the bracket.

=== Northeast regional ===
First round Philadelphia; July 17
13	NYC Superstars	FW
18	Max's All Stars	75
TYGTAL	68
16	The Wrecking Crew	FW
4	DMV's Finest	128
22	Elite	72
6	Free Bands	114
21	The Horsemen	107
3	Team City of Gods	88
23	Team Pup N' Suds	69
7	North Broad Street Bullies	FW
11	Blue and Gold Club	75
14	Basketball City	95

Second round Philadelphia; July 18
1	Boeheim's Army	91
13	NYC Superstars	73
8	20th & Olney	87
18	Max's All Stars	80
5	Liberty Ballers	93
16	The Wrecking Crew	79
4	DMV's Finest	95
19	WOYG	61
6	Free Bands	106
17	Triumph	99
3	Team City of Gods	115
24	Lynchburg College Club	50
7	North Broad Street Bullies	63
15	Sideline Cancer	72
2	Big Apple Basketball	87
14	Basketball City	85

Third round Philadelphia; July 19
1	Boeheim's Army	92
8	20th & Olney	91(OT)
5	Liberty Ballers	85
4	DMV's Finest	73
6	Free Bands	84
3	Team City of Gods	96
15	Sideline Cancer	70
2	Big Apple Basketball	67

Super 17; Chicago; July 24
1	Boeheim's Army	78
5	Liberty Ballers	72
3	Team City of Gods	91
15	Sideline Cancer	78

Regional final Chicago; July 25
1	Boeheim's Army	76
3	Team City of Gods	80

Three teams withdrew from the tournament—Friar Nation, The Citi Team, and Team Oohway—resulting in forfeit wins for their first-round opponents.

=== West regional ===
First round Los Angeles; July 10
16	VBL Dream Team	77
15	The Revolution	71
9	7outz	96
21	Los Angeles Dragons	90
5	Air Force Bomb Squad	116
23	Too Fresh	66
13	Team 23	91
19	West Coast Ronin	67
12	H-Squad	78
20	Mostly Sports Delco	57
14	Nova Stars	99
17	JBL	75
7	Nationwide All-Stars	85
22	AZ Sharp Shooterz	73
2	LA Unified	139
24	Pistol Shrimps	34

Second round Los Angeles; July 11
1	Grantland	93
16	VBL Dream Team	63
8	Global Select	88
9	7outz	94
5	Air Force Bomb Squad	90
11	Team B-Ball Breakdown	105
4	Team Colorado	72
13	Team 23	78
6	Team Utah	82
12	H-Squad	71
3	Seattle Pro-Am	FL
14	Nova Stars	FW
7	Nationwide All-Stars	83
10	Cali Boyz	81
2	LA Unified	128
18	Everett Evolution	87

Third round Los Angeles; July 12
1	Grantland	82
9	7outz	85
11	Team B-Ball Breakdown	72
13	Team 23	86
6	Team Utah	93
14	Nova Stars	69
7	Nationwide All-Stars	81
2	LA Unified	95

Super 17; Chicago; July 24
9	7outz	64
13	Team 23	105
6	Team Utah	82
2	LA Unified	93

Regional final Chicago; July 25
13	Team 23	77
2	LA Unified	56

=== Regional finals ===
Regional finals
Region	Winner	Score	Loser
Midwest	Ants Alumni	76–72	Armored Athlete
West	Team 23	77–56	LA Unified
Northeast	Team City of Gods	80–76	Boeheim's Army
South	Overseas Elite	77–72	Dirty South

=== Semifinals & final ===
Semifinals
August 1 – New York City
MW 2	Ants Alumni	76
W 13	Team 23	87
August 1 – New York City
NE 3	Team City of Gods	71
S 3	Overseas Elite	84

Final
August 2 – New York City
W 13	Team 23	65
S 3	Overseas Elite	67

== Awards ==
MVP: D. J. Kennedy of Overseas Elite
