= Jimmer Fredette =

American basketball player (born 1989)

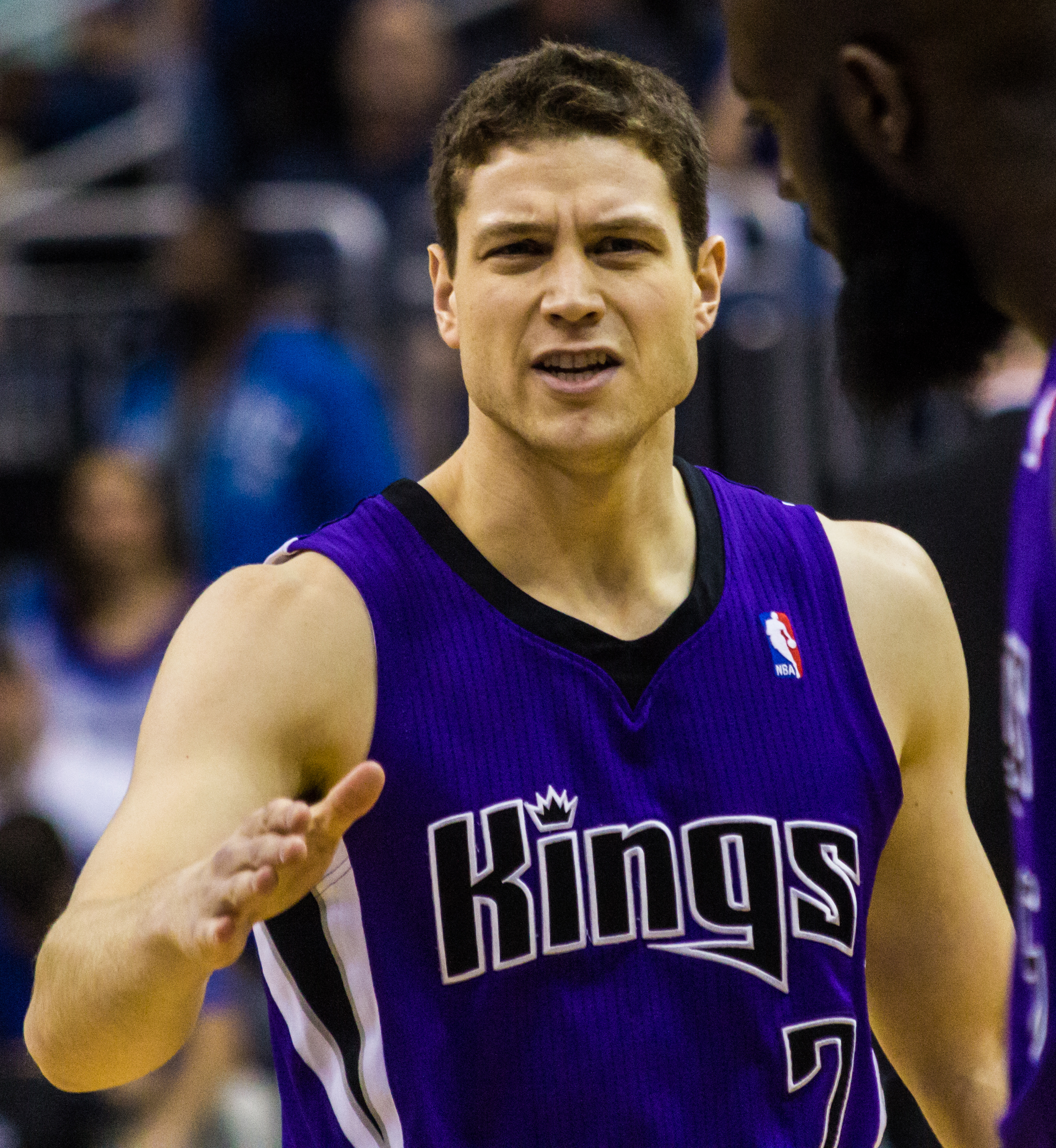
- Fredette with the Sacramento Kings in 2013

Personal information
- Born: February 25, 1989 (age 37) Glens Falls, New York, U.S.
- Listed height: 6 ft 2 in (1.88 m)
- Listed weight: 195 lb (88 kg)

Career information
- High school: Glens Falls (Glens Falls, New York)
- College: BYU (2007–2011)
- NBA draft: 2011: 1st round, 10th overall pick
- Drafted by: Milwaukee Bucks
- Playing career: 2011–2025
- Position: Point guard / shooting guard
- Number: 7, 16, 32

Career history
- 2011–2014: Sacramento Kings
- 2014: Chicago Bulls
- 2014–2015: New Orleans Pelicans
- 2015–2016: Westchester Knicks
- 2016: New York Knicks
- 2016–2019: Shanghai Sharks
- 2019: Phoenix Suns
- 2019–2020: Panathinaikos
- 2020–2021: Shanghai Sharks

Career highlights
- Greek League champion (2020); EuroLeague 50–40–90 club (2020); CBA International MVP (2017); 3× CBA All-Star (2017–2019); All-NBA D-League Second Team (2016); NBA D-League All-Star (2016); NBA D-League All-Star Game MVP (2016); National college player of the year (2011); Consensus first-team All-American (2011); Third-team All-American – NABC, TSN (2010); NCAA scoring champion (2011); MWC Male Athlete of the Year (2011); MWC Player of the Year (2011); 3× First-team All-MWC (2009–2011); Senior CLASS Award (2011); No. 32 retired by BYU Cougars; USA Basketball 3x3 Male Athlete of the Year (2023)
- Stats at NBA.com
- Stats at Basketball Reference
Medals
Men's 3x3 basketball
Representing the United States
FIBA 3x3 World Cup
Silver medal – second place	2023 Vienna	Team
FIBA 3x3 AmeriCup
Gold medal – first place	2022 Miami
Gold medal – first place	2026 San Salvador
Pan American Games
Gold medal – first place	2023 Santiago	Team

James Taft "Jimmer" Fredette (born February 25, 1989) is an American professional basketball player. Fredette was the 2011 National Player of the Year in college basketball, after ranking as the leading scorer in all of NCAA Division I during his senior season for the BYU Cougars. He was subsequently selected with the 10th overall pick in the 2011 NBA draft.

Fredette has played for several professional teams in the NBA and NBA Development League, as well as internationally. Fredette was the CBA Most Valuable Player in 2017, and he was a member of the GBL's championship team in 2020. Fredette began competing in 3x3 basketball in 2022, winning two gold medals and one silver medal in international play, and representing Team USA at the 2024 Summer Olympics as a member of the first USA Basketball 3x3 Men's National Team to compete at the Olympics. Fredette retired from basketball in 2025 and served as the managing director of the USA Basketball 3x3 Men's National Team for a year before coming out of retirement in 2026 to resume play on the FIBA 3x3 Men’s Pro Circuit.

== Early life ==
Fredette was born in Glens Falls, New York, to parents Al and Kay Fredette, as the youngest of three children. His mother wanted to call him something unique and nicknamed him "Jimmer".

From his early childhood, Fredette showed unusual dedication to athletics. His older brother TJ recalled, "He was the most determined, competitive four-year-old I had ever seen." TJ helped him train for his basketball career since before kindergarten. He regularly played with TJ, seven years older, and TJ's friends on the family's backyard court. Fredette was able to hit three-pointers at age 5, and developed moves to get around his larger opponents. TJ also remembered that his brother "willed himself to find ways to win, even if he was physically outmatched. From the time he was 10, I was telling everybody he was going to make the NBA."

Other family members assisted Fredette in his development. His father, a financial adviser, introduced him to schoolyard competition against adults at age eight. As Fredette developed, his father took him on occasional road trips to Hartford and New York City for more intense competition, and also helped to coach his AAU teams. His mother allowed him to bounce basketballs throughout the house, and even built a dribbling studio for him in their basement. Her brother Lee Taft, a personal trainer who now operates a speed training school in Indianapolis, started him on running drills as a five-year-old, and still works with Fredette.

Fredette also has an older sister, Lindsay, Miss Teen New York 1998. Fredette's father became a member of the Church of Jesus Christ of Latter-day Saints at the age of 18 after meeting missionary Kimball Rogers, who would end up being the father of Fredette's BYU teammate Stephen Rogers. Fredette's mother is a Catholic. Fredette, along with his two older siblings, chose to become Latter-day Saints after their parents allowed them to choose their religion.

== High school career ==
Fredette was ranked among the nation's top 75 shooting guards by ESPN.com in high school. He was Glens Falls High School's all-time leading scorer, ranking 16th on New York's all-time scoring list, with 2,404 points. Until February 24, 2015, Fredette held the all-time Section 2 high school record, when he was surpassed by Lake George senior Joel Wincowski. Fredette was named first-team all-state by the New York State Sportswriters Association and the Times Union as a junior and senior. He had several memorable on-court moments in his career at Glens Falls, including 12 different 40-point performances in his senior season, and a shot against Voorheesville High School's Andrew Catellier in the season opener of his junior year in which he banked a three-pointer off the glass and in with his opposite hand to force overtime at the end of regulation. In his senior season Fredette led his team to a 25–2 record and the Class A State Championship game which they lost, 58–48, to a Peekskill High School team led by future Syracuse University forward Mookie Jones. He played AAU for the Albany City Rocks alongside future Penn State University point guard Talor Battle and Mark Domaracki. Fredette averaged 25 points per game to help the Rocks to a third-place win over the Minnesota Magic at the 2006 AAU National Championships.

Despite his high school accolades, he went largely unnoticed by the traditional "basketball powers". He received offers from 12 schools and ultimately chose to attend BYU, which was his sister Lindsay's alma mater.

== College career ==
Fredette played basketball collegiately at Brigham Young University (BYU) from 2007 to 2011. He wore jersey number 32 and majored in American studies.

=== Freshman year ===
Fredette played in all 35 games for the BYU Cougars as a true freshman, helping BYU earn a 27–8 record and capture the Mountain West Conference regular season championship. He averaged 18.5 minutes, 7.0 points, 1.7 assists, 1.1 rebounds per game, and was the team's fifth-leading scorer.

=== Sophomore year ===
Fredette played in all 33 games of his sophomore season starting 32 of them. He was second on the team in scoring (16.2), three-point shooting percentage (.382), three-point makes (52), and free throw percentage (.847), and first in steals (1.5) and assists (4.1). He scored in double figures 29 times and had 20-plus points 8 times. Fredette led the team in scoring 10 times, assists 19 times, and was named first team all Mountain West. Fredette became BYU's first point guard to earn first-team all-conference honors since Marty Haws in 1990.

=== Junior year ===
On December 28, 2009, Jimmer Fredette scored 49 points against the Arizona Wildcats, setting a new BYU record and a new McKale Center record for points scored in a single game.

On March 11, 2010, Fredette scored 45 points, shooting 10-for-23 from the field, and making 23-of-24 free throws, in his team's 95–85 win over TCU. His scoring broke the cumulative Mountain West Conference tournament and single-game tournament records. His free throw shooting broke the MWC tournament record for free throws in a single game.

On March 18, 2010, Fredette helped secure BYU's first-round win in the NCAA tournament. He scored 37 points and hit two three-pointers in double-overtime to seal the Cougars' 99–92 win over 10th-seeded Florida, the first time they had reached the second round of the tournament in 17 years. In doing so, he tied a BYU record for most points scored in an NCAA tournament game (Danny Ainge, 1981).

Fredette considered forgoing his senior year and entering the draft after his junior year, and he was expected to be picked 25th to 30th, but he decided to stay at BYU and play his senior year.

=== Senior year ===
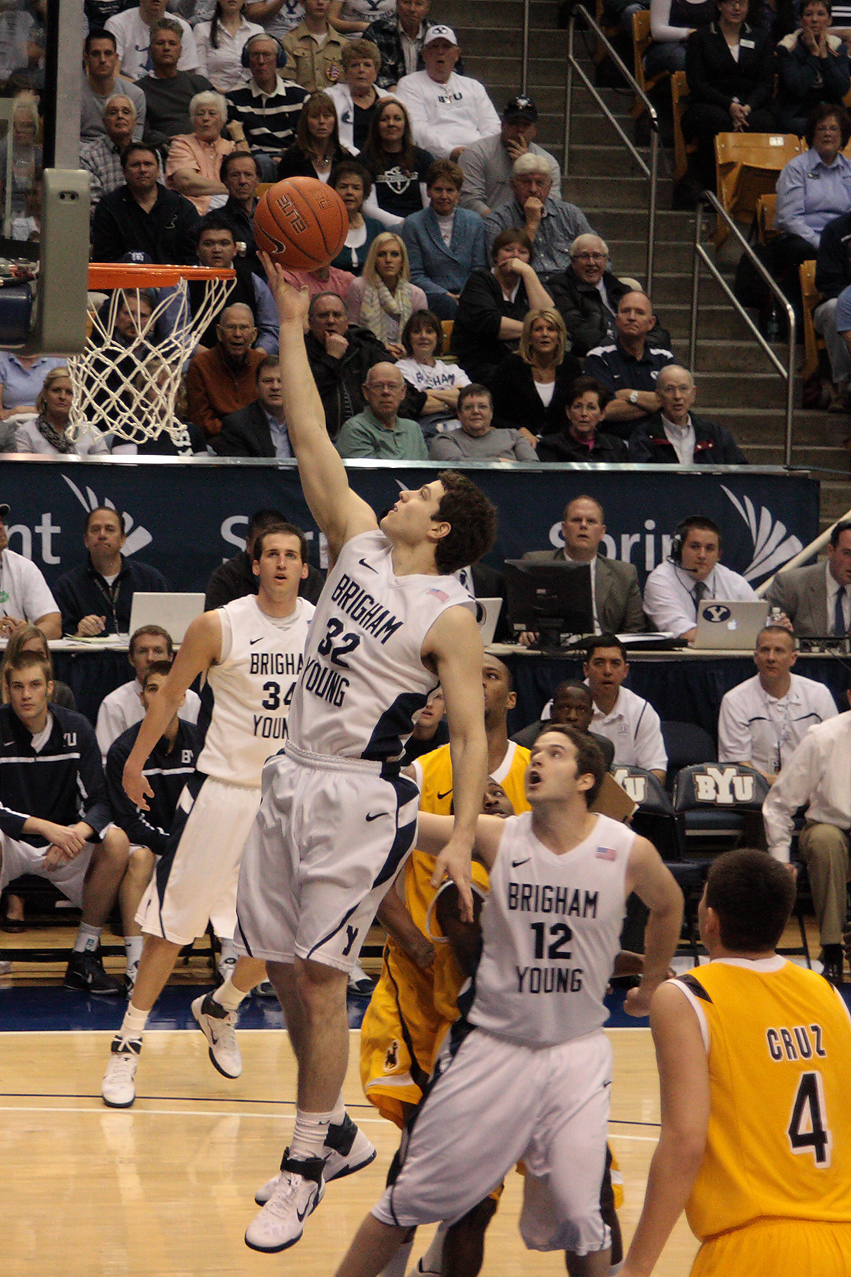
Fredette playing for BYU

Fredette was named co-captain of his team alongside Jackson Emery and Logan Magnusson. He was the top-ranked point guard in the nation according to Rivals.com and led the nation in points per game despite frequently being double- or triple-teamed, which allowed him to open up shots for his teammates.

Fredette scored a season-high 47 points in BYU's road victory over archrival Utah on January 11, 2011, scoring 32 in the first half including a 40-foot buzzer-beater to end the first half. He finished with 16 of 28 shooting, along with four rebounds and six assists. He also scored 39 against UNLV on January 5, 2011, and 33 in a rematch against the same University of Arizona team he scored 49 against his junior season.

On December 8, 2010, he returned to his hometown of Glens Falls, in what was dubbed "The Hometown Classic", to play Vermont in the Glens Falls Civic Center, scoring 26 and attracting a crowd of 6,300, nearly half of Glens Falls' population of 14,354.

On January 26, 2011, in the Mountain West Conference's first battle of top-10 teams, which attracted a crowd of over 22,700 at BYU's Marriott Center, Fredette scored 43 points against previously undefeated San Diego State, ending the game in a 71–58 victory. It was his third game that season to score over 40 points. When BYU played on the road in San Diego, BYU dealt SDSU its only other loss that season, with an 80–67 victory in which Fredette had 25 points, 9 assists and 3 rebounds.

He became the Mountain West Conference's all-time leading scorer on February 5, 2011, with a 29-point performance versus UNLV in the Marriott Center.

On March 7, 2011, Fredette was named both the Mountain West Conference's player of the year and the CBSSports.com National Player of the Year. He was among the final ten candidates for the Bob Cousy Award.

On March 11, 2011, Fredette broke BYU's career scoring record, previously held by Danny Ainge, in the semifinals of the Mountain West Conference Championship Tournament. He set the school's single-game scoring record with a career-high 52-point game against New Mexico, to whom BYU had lost twice in the regular season. He also set BYU's record for most points in one half by scoring 33 points in the first half of the game. Fredette and number 12-ranked BYU were unable to hold off an aggressive 5th-ranked San Diego State team in the Mountain West Conference championship game, and lost, 72–54.

On March 17, 2011, Fredette led 3rd-seeded BYU's scoring in the first round of the NCAA tournament with 32 points, leading the Cougars to a 74–66 victory over 14th-seeded Wofford, and for the second consecutive year BYU advanced to the second round of the NCAA tournament.

On March 19, 2011, Fredette again led BYU's scoring with 34 points as they defeated 11th-seeded Gonzaga, 89–67, and advanced to the third round of the NCAA Tournament (Sweet Sixteen) for the first time since 1981, falling to the Florida Gators (in overtime) in a rematch of the game from the previous year.

He was picked to the First-Team All-America by Fox Sports.

For his senior year performance, Fredette was selected as the Mountain West Conference Male Athlete of the Year, and unanimously named the 2011 national player of the year, being so named by the Associated Press, Basketball Times, CBSSports.com, the National Association of Basketball Coaches, SI.com, Athlon Sports, and Sporting News. He was also awarded the 2011 Best Male College Athlete ESPY Award.

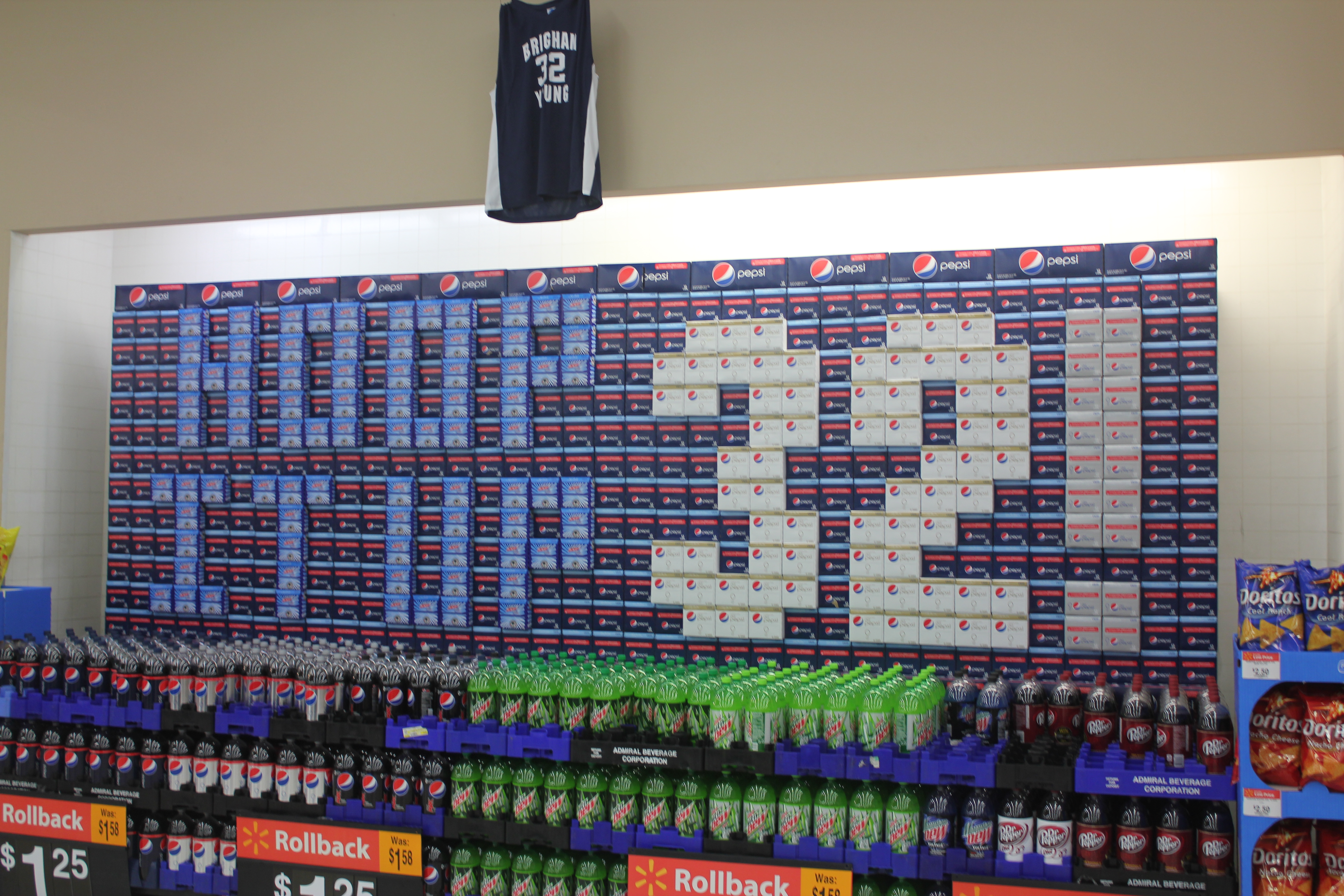
Display in an Orem, Utah, Walmart promoting "Jimmermania"

After BYU's nationally televised game against San Diego State in which Fredette scored 43 points, the media attention around him became significant. Fredette gained "pop culture lore", and his name became a verb—opponents on whom he scored many points were considered "Jimmered". His image appeared on one of the regional covers for Sports Illustrated for the 2011 NCAA tournament preview issue.

While revealing his NCAA Tournament brackets, President Barack Obama said of Fredette: "Unbelievable. Best scorer obviously in the country. Great talent."

=== Jersey retirement ===
On February 14, 2026, at halftime of a BYU victory over Colorado, Fredette's jersey was retired by BYU in recognition of his achievements during his college career.

=== College records ===
BYU:

- Most points scored (game) (52 pts)
- Most Points Scored (season) (1068)
- Most Free Throws Made (game) (23)
- Most Free Throws Made (season) (252)
- Most Free Throws Made (career) (627)
- Most Field Goals Made (game) (22)
- Most Field Goals Made (season) (346)
- Most Three-Point FGs Made (season) (124)
- Most Three-Point FGs Made (career) (296)
- Most 30-point games (career) (24)
- Most 40-point games (career) (6)

MWC:

- Most Points Scored (game) (52)
- Most Points Scored (season) (1068)
- Most Points Scored (career) (2599)
- Most Field Goals Made (season) (346)
- Most Field Goals Made (career) (838)
- Second Most Three-Point FGs Made (career) (296)

== Professional career ==
=== Sacramento Kings (2011–2014) ===
On June 23, 2011, Fredette was selected by the Milwaukee Bucks with the 10th overall pick in the 2011 NBA draft. He was subsequently traded to the Sacramento Kings in a deal with Milwaukee and the Charlotte Bobcats involving John Salmons, Beno Udrih, Shaun Livingston, Corey Maggette, and Stephen Jackson.

"Jimmermania" in Sacramento was felt immediately as he recharged the fan base. Sales of his jersey resulted in a 540% increase in Sacramento Kings merchandise sales, as his No. 7 Kings jersey sold out in stores in the Sacramento area, as well as online. Fredette made his rookie debut in a preseason game against the Golden State Warriors on December 17, 2011, scoring 21 points (tied for team high) and recording 4 rebounds. He got his first start on January 10, 2012, against the Philadelphia 76ers.

On February 12, 2014, Fredette scored a career-high 24 points, along with two assists and six three-pointers, in a 106–101 overtime win over the New York Knicks. On February 27, 2014, Fredette's contract was bought out by the Kings.

=== Chicago Bulls (2014) ===
On March 2, 2014, Fredette signed with the Chicago Bulls for the rest of the 2013–14 season.

=== New Orleans Pelicans (2014–2015) ===
On July 24, 2014, Fredette signed with the New Orleans Pelicans. On December 31, 2014, he had a season-best game with 14 points and 3 rebounds in a 95–93 overtime loss to the San Antonio Spurs.

On July 22, 2015, Fredette signed with the Spurs. However, he was later waived by the Spurs on October 21, 2015, after appearing in two preseason games. On October 31, Fredette was selected by the Westchester Knicks with the second overall pick in the 2015 NBA Development League Draft.

On November 10, 2015, Fredette re-signed with the Pelicans to help the team deal with numerous injuries. New Orleans had to use an NBA hardship exception in order to sign him as he made their roster stand at 16, one over the allowed limit of 15. On November 19, he was waived by the Pelicans.

=== Westchester Knicks (2015–2016) ===
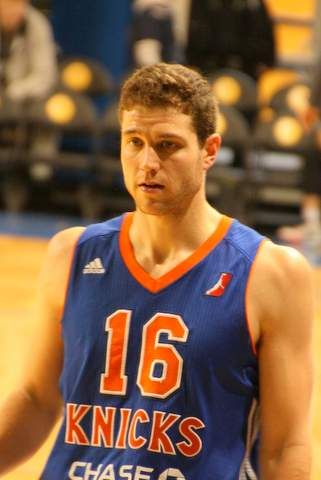
Fredette with Westchester in 2016

On November 28, 2015, Fredette was reacquired by the Westchester Knicks. He made his debut for the Knicks two days later, recording 37 points and eight assists in a 102–90 win over the Grand Rapids Drive. On January 29, 2016, he was named to the East All-Star team for the 2016 NBA D-League All-Star Game. On February 13, he led the East All-Star team to a 128–124 win over the West, winning the D-League All-Star Game MVP trophy after recording 35 points, six rebounds, eight assists, and one steal in 25 minutes.

=== New York Knicks (2016) ===
On February 22, 2016, Fredette signed a ten-day contract with the New York Knicks. That night he made his debut for New York in a 122–95 loss to the Toronto Raptors, recording three points in two minutes off the bench. On March 2, the Knicks chose not to offer Fredette a second 10-day contract, making him a free agent.

=== Return to Westchester (2016) ===
On March 6, Fredette was reacquired by Westchester. At the season's end, he was named to the All-NBA D-League Second Team. Fredette played for the Denver Nuggets Summer League team during the 2016 NBA offseason, but was not signed by an NBA team.

=== Shanghai Sharks (2016–2019) ===
On August 2, 2016, Fredette signed with the Shanghai Sharks of the Chinese Basketball Association (CBA). Early in the season, on November 11, he had a 51-point outing against the Guangdong Southern Tigers. On February 19, 2017, Fredette scored 73 points in Shanghai's 135–132 double overtime loss to Zhejiang Guangsha Lions. He was subsequently named the CBA's International Regular Season MVP of the 2016–17 season. In 41 games, he averaged 37.6 points, 8.2 rebounds, 4.2 assists, and 1.6 steals per game. He shot 52.5% from the field on 2-point field goal attempts, 47.4% from the field, 39.6% from 3-point range, and 93.3% from the free throw line. He ranked first in the CBA in points per game scoring average, over all phases of the season; and he ranked second in the league in scoring, during the first phase of the season, which determines the league's scoring champion.

On July 23, 2017, Fredette re-signed with the Sharks on a two-year deal. On November 11, Fredette recorded a career-high 75 points (including him scoring a record-high 40 in the fourth quarter) in a 137–136 loss to the Beikong Fly Dragons. At the end of the 2018–19 CBA season, he led the entire league in overall total points scored, however Pierre Jackson was the league's scoring champion, as he led the league in points per game.

=== Phoenix Suns (2019) ===
On March 22, 2019, Fredette signed a two-year contract with the Phoenix Suns. He made his official return to the NBA a day later against his first NBA team, the Sacramento Kings. In his next game on March 25, Fredette was given a standing ovation in his return to Utah in a loss against the Utah Jazz. However, after only playing in six games and averaging only 3.7 points per game, on June 24, Phoenix declined to pick up the second-year option of Fredette's deal and his short return to the NBA ended. He would be the last Sun to wear #32 before it was retired in honor of Amar'e Stoudemire.

=== Panathinaikos (2019–2020) ===
On July 15, 2019, Fredette signed a two-year contract with Panathinaikos of Greece's top-tier level Greek Basketball League and the EuroLeague. When the Greek League suspended play due to the COVID-19 pandemic, Panathinaikos was named league champion.

Panathinaikos experienced serious financial difficulties as a result of the pandemic, and on July 4, 2020, the team announced that Fredette's contract was too heavy for the team's budget. As a result, Fredette was essentially laid off.

=== Return to Shanghai (2020–2021) ===
On September 6, Fredette confirmed via Twitter that he intended to return to the Shanghai Sharks, and he made his return debut on October 18. On October 20, he scored 26 points to lead all scorers as the Sharks earned their first win of the season, 95–88 over the Shanxi Sturgeons. Fredette became the Shanghai Sharks all time 3-point leader on December 29, 2020.

As a result of the pandemic, Fredette was forced to leave China early in 2021 and suspend his involvement with the Shanghai Sharks. On August 5, 2021, as it became clear that foreign players likely would not be able to compete in the 2021–22 CBA season, Fredette was signed to the Denver Nuggets Summer League roster for the second time. However, he almost immediately withdrew from Summer League play due to unspecified issues.

=== The Basketball Tournament ===
Fredette has participated in The Basketball Tournament (TBT), a million-dollar winner-take-all summer tournament broadcast on the ESPN family of channels. In TBT 2017, he acted as coach for Team Fredette, which lost in the first round to Team Utah, 100–97. In TBT 2018, he played for Team Fredette, leading the team to four wins and a spot in the semifinals, where they lost to Eberlein Drive, 80–76. He returned as a player in TBT 2022, with The Money Team.

=== 3x3 basketball and Olympics ===
In 2022, Fredette made his 3x3 debut at the 2022 Red Bull USA Basketball 3X East Regional, which took place October 8–9 in New York, and helped team NYC Blue win the event. On October 25, 2022, Fredette, Canyon Barry, Kareem Maddox, and Dylan Travis were named to the USA Men's 2022 3x3 AmeriCup team. At the 2022 FIBA 3x3 AmeriCup, which took place November 4–6 in Miami, Fredette and his team won gold. In FIBA 3x3 World Cup 2023, Fredette played for USA, winning the silver medal, and Fredette was selected for the Team of the Tournament.

In 2024, Fredette represented Team USA at the 2024 Summer Olympics as a member of the first USA Basketball 3x3 Men's National Team to compete at the Olympics. Fredette suffered an adductor tear in the second pool play game and didn't play in four of the games, and the team was eliminated after going 2–5.

On April 23, 2025, Fredette announced his retirement from basketball. On September 15, 2026, he announced he was coming out of retirement to resume 3x3 competition.

== Executive career ==
On April 28, 2025, Fredette was announced as the first managing director of the USA Basketball 3x3 Men's National Team. He served in the role for a year-and-a-half until deciding to resume his playing career.

== Career statistics ==
Legend
GP	Games played	GS	Games started	MPG	Minutes per game
FG%	Field goal percentage	3P%	3-point field goal percentage	FT%	Free throw percentage
RPG	Rebounds per game	APG	Assists per game	SPG	Steals per game
BPG	Blocks per game	PPG	Points per game	**Bold**	Career high

=== College ===
Year	Team	GP	GS	MPG	FG%	3P%	FT%	RPG	APG	SPG	BPG	PPG
2007–08	BYU	35	0	18.5	.407	.336	.854	1.1	1.7	0.8	**0.1**	7.0
2008–09	BYU	33	32	33.0	**.480**	.382	.847	3.0	4.1	**1.5**	**0.1**	16.2
2009–10	BYU	34	33	31.1	.458	**.440**	.892	3.1	**4.7**	1.2	**0.1**	22.1
2010–11	BYU	**37**	**37**	**35.8**	.452	.396	**.894**	**3.4**	4.3	1.3	0.0	**28.9**
Career		139	102	29.6	.455	.394	.882	2.6	3.7	1.2	0.1	18.7

=== NBA ===
==== Regular season ====
Year	Team	GP	GS	MPG	FG%	3P%	FT%	RPG	APG	SPG	BPG	PPG
2011–12	Sacramento	61	**7**	**18.6**	.386	.361	.833	**1.2**	**1.8**	**.5**	.0	**7.6**
2012–13	Sacramento	**69**	0	14.0	.421	.417	.859	1.0	1.3	.4	.0	7.2
2013–14	Sacramento	41	0	11.3	.475	.493	.895	1.1	1.5	.3	**.1**	5.9
2013–14	Chicago	8	0	7.0	.448	.364	**1.000**	.9	.4	.0	.0	4.0
2014–15	New Orleans	50	0	10.2	.380	.188	.956	.8	1.2	.3	.0	3.6
2015–16	New Orleans	4	0	3.3	.250	.000	.000	.0	.3	.3	.0	.5
2015–16	New York	2	0	2.5	**1.000**	**1.000**	.800	.0	.0	.0	.0	3.5
2018–19	Phoenix	6	0	10.8	.276	.000	**1.000**	**1.2**	1.3	**.5**	.0	3.7
Career		241	7	13.3	.409	.372	.879	1.0	1.4	.4	.0	6.0

=== CBA ===
Year	Team	GP	GS	MPG	FG%	3P%	FT%	RPG	APG	SPG	BPG	PPG
2016–17	Shanghai Sharks	37	37	39.3	.482	.411	.928	7.9	4.3	1.7	.1	37.3
2017–18	Shanghai Sharks	38	38	41.1	.453	.424	.948	6.7	5.4	2.0	.0	37.4
2018–19	Shanghai Sharks	43	43	40.2	.480	.424	.917	5.7	5.4	2.6	.2	36.9
2020–21	Shanghai Sharks	44	44	32.1	.466	.402	.936	5.8	6.4	1.6	.5	27.3

=== EuroLeague ===
Year	Team	GP	GS	MPG	FG%	3P%	FT%	RPG	APG	SPG	BPG	PPG	PIR
2019–20	Panathinaikos	27	24	21.3	.474	.417	.955	2.1	1.8	.8	.0	12.9	12.6

== Playing style and personality ==
In a January 2011 article, Sports Illustrated writer Kelli Anderson said about Fredette's playing style:

Facing the opposition's best defender (or, more often, defenders), he pulls up going right or going left. He shoots off the dribble, off the wrong foot, off balance, off the glass. He finishes in traffic with a dozen deft moves, including a scoop shot, originating from his waist, that he can make with either hand.

His skills were noted by several collegiate and NBA players across the country. Kevin Durant of the Oklahoma City Thunder posted on his Twitter account that "Jimmer Fredette is the best scorer in the world!", while Steve Nash of the Phoenix Suns tweeted "Jimmer Fredette? That name's straight out of Hoosiers. No wonder he never misses." Jared Sullinger, a forward at Ohio State University, said "Jimmer is going off right now. Pure scorer."

Other facets of his personality were noted by other college coaches. Former Utah Utes coach Jim Boylen cited "swagger and confidence" as Fredette's biggest weapons, and Villanova's Jay Wright also remarked favorably on Fredette's on-court aggressiveness, comparing him to Pete Maravich in that respect. However, Kelli Anderson described Fredette as "fiercely competitive while remaining unassuming and likable," noting that Arizona coach Sean Miller hugged Fredette after he scored 49 on the Wildcats.

Fredette describes his older brother TJ as his biggest fan and supporter. TJ, a rapper whose song "Amazing" was written for his brother, said, "I see him play, and it gives me chills sometimes when he hits some of those big shots and the crowd is going crazy."

In an article published in Sports Illustrated, Marcus Morris, a forward at Kansas, noted the work ethic and moral character Fredette exhibited while at USA Basketball camp. He said, "He's got heart. You can see he has a feel for the game, and he can shoot it from anywhere. Even if you try to box-and-one the guy, he brings it up and just pulls up from the hashmark. That's tough to guard."

An unusual set of Fredette fans resided in the Mount McGregor Correctional Facility, a medium-security prison, where he and his older brother played games with the inmates. Fredette credits these experiences as helping with his focus in rough situations. The prison closed in 2014.

Upon entering the NBA, Fredette struggled to find his game, with Yahoo Sports' Michael Lee noting that Fredette's inability to adjust from being a scorer to more of a role player could ultimately usher an end to his career.

After signing with the CBA's Shanghai Sharks, Fredette became a dominant player in the Chinese Basketball League, leading his team to the playoffs in 3 of his 4 years there. He also acquired the fan nickname "Jimo Dashen", which translates to "The Lonely Master" or "The Lonely God" in Chinese. Fredette commented on this during an interview: "It's not necessarily the same sense that you think about being lonely. In America, you just think you are by yourself and depressed and that type of stuff. But in this way, it more means that you're on top, and nobody is around you."

Fredette became a leader on his team, although, particularly early in his CBA career, his primary form of communication with his teammates was via an interpreter.

== Personal life ==
Fredette is married to Whitney Wonnacott and the couple has three children. Fredette met his wife while at BYU where she was a cheerleader, and the two were married in 2012 in the Denver Colorado Temple. During the 2017 CBA playoffs, Fredette missed his team's first playoff game because he traveled home to Denver to be with his wife during the birth of their first child.

== See also ==
- List of NCAA Division I men's basketball season scoring leaders
- List of NCAA Division I men's basketball career scoring leaders
- 2010 NCAA Men's Basketball All-Americans

== Sources ==
- Forde, Pat (2012). The Contract: The Journey of Jimmer Fredette from the Playground to the Pros. Shadow Mountain. ISBN 978-1609071400.
- Tracy, Kathleen; Reed, Jeremy C. (2012). Beyond the Arc: The Jimmer Fredette Story. Reed Media Services. ISBN 978-1-937516-02-4.
