= The Basketball Tournament 2014 =

The Basketball Tournament
- 2014

Tournament information
- Dates: June 6–June 28, 2014
- Tournament format: Single elimination
- Hosts: Philadelphia, Pennsylvania; Boston, Massachusetts
- Participants: 32
- Purse: $500,000 winner-take-all

Final positions
- Champions: Notre Dame Fighting Alumni
- Runner-up: Team Barstool

Tournament statistics
- MVP: Tyrone Nash
- Top scorer: Dahntay Jones (108 pts)
- Games played: 31

The Basketball Tournament 2014 was the first edition of The Basketball Tournament, a 5-on-5, single elimination basketball tournament. The tournament involved 32 teams; it started on June 6 and continued through June 28, 2014. The winner of the final, Notre Dame Fighting Alumni, received a half-million dollar prize. The championship game was played in Boston, at Case Gym on the campus of Boston University, and was broadcast on ESPN3.

== Format ==
The tournament field started with 32 teams; 24 teams were selected based on the size of their fan groups, and eight teams were selected at-large by TBT organizers.

The winning team received a half-million dollars, while fans entered into an online "Fanwagon Sweepstakes" for various raffle prizes including $25,000 cash.

== Venues ==
The Basketball Tournament 2014 took place in two locations.

Round	Dates	Location
Round 1	June 6	Philadelphia, Pennsylvania
Round 2	June 7	Philadelphia, Pennsylvania
Quarterfinals	June 7	Philadelphia, Pennsylvania
Semifinals	June 8	Philadelphia, Pennsylvania
Finals	June 28	Boston, Massachusetts

Tournament founder Jonathan Mugar has said that the attendance at the first game was only 17 people.

== Bracket ==
=== Pod 1 ===
Round 1 June 6 Philadelphia
1	Team Barstool	111
32	Barstool Sports Philly	84
16	PUBB Champions Tour	66
17	St Anthony	47
8	Rep Your City	83
25	Horsemen	73
9	DMV's Finest	92
24	TeamBang	81

Round 2 June 7 Philadelphia
1	Team Barstool	68
16	PUBB Champions Tour	66
8	Rep Your City	77
9	DMV's Finest	90

Quarterfinals; June 7 Philadelphia
1	Team Barstool	83
9	DMV's Finest	76

=== Pod 2 ===
Round 1 June 6 Philadelphia
2	Philly Patriots	71
31	Team Pup N' Suds	51
15	*THE CITI TEAM*	77
18	Air Force Bomb Squad	72
7	Team FOE	99
26	Sideline Cancer	106
10	Notre Dame Fighting Alumni	78
23	NYCSuperStars	66

Round 2 June 7 Philadelphia
2	Philly Patriots	70
15	*THE CITI TEAM*	74
26	Sideline Cancer	66
10	Notre Dame Fighting Alumni	75

Quarterfinals; June 7 Philadelphia
15	*THE CITI TEAM*	61
10	Notre Dame Fighting Alumni	74

=== Pod 3 ===
Round 1 June 6 Philadelphia
3	Sconnie Legends	102
30	SHOWTIME	63
14	North Broad Street Bullies	90
19	El Vino	80
6	Team ROBY	127
27	Teasley's All Stars	88
11	PeacePlayers International	85
22	International All-Stars	67

Round 2 June 7 Philadelphia
3	Sconnie Legends	80
14	North Broad Street Bullies	96
6	Team ROBY	82
11	PeacePlayers International	98

Quarterfinals; June 7 Philadelphia
14	North Broad Street Bullies	80
11	PeacePlayers International	82

=== Pod 4 ===
Round 1 June 6 Philadelphia
4	Big Apple Basketball	113
29	Eberlein Drive	71
13	Sean Bell Allstars	66
20	HITTAS	71
5	TYGTAL	91
28	Olivet Nazarene University Tigers	84
12	Cornell Sweet Sixteen	70
21	Illinois Hoopville Warriors	84

Round 2 June 7 Philadelphia
4	Big Apple Basketball	76
20	HITTAS	75
5	TYGTAL	71
21	Illinois Hoopville Warriors	93

Quarterfinals; June 7 Philadelphia
4	Big Apple Basketball	75
21	Illinois Hoopville Warriors	72

=== Semifinals & final ===
Semifinals; June 8 Philadelphia
1	Team Barstool	87
4	Big Apple Basketball	81
10	Notre Dame Fighting Alumni	91
11	PeacePlayers International	61

Final; June 28; Boston
1	Team Barstool	68
10	Notre Dame Fighting Alumni	72

== Awards ==
MVP: Tyrone Nash of Notre Dame Fighting Alumni
