= Elam Ending =

Basketball untimed format

The Elam Ending, also known as final target score or winning score, is a rules format for basketball. Unlike traditional basketball rules, in which the game is played with four timed quarters or two timed halves, teams end the game by playing to a target score. The game is played in its traditional format up until a certain point (for example, until the fourth quarter or the last few minutes of the fourth quarter). Then, the clock is turned off and the teams play to a target score, which is the leading team's score plus a predetermined number of points. A variation used by the NBA G League implements the Elam Ending in games that go into overtime.

While the format has been used for years in many sports (for example, ultimate frisbee), it is named for Nick Elam, a professor at Ball State University. The Elam Ending was first used by The Basketball Tournament in 2017. The Elam Ending received widespread attention in 2020 when it was chosen as the format for the NBA All-Star Game. It has since been adopted by other leagues, such as the Canadian Elite Basketball League later that year, as well as the NBA G League (which uses it as its overtime format). The organizers of TBT announced that they would adapt the concept for a spin-off soccer tournament in 2023. More recently, the Unrivaled women's 3-on-3 basketball league announced it would adopt the ending for its first season in 2025.

== Format ==
Instead of a game clock, teams play to a target score, with the shot clock still enforced. The first team to meet or exceed the target score wins, so there is no overtime. The winning score can be a walk-off field goal (two-point or three-point) or a free throw. This format has been compared to how 3X3 is typically played, as 3x3 games are typically played to a target score or time limit (in FIBA play, 21; if the time limit is reached with the game tied, the first to two points in the overtime wins).

Nick Elam devised this system because he was frustrated with stalling and passive play by a leading team and intentionally fouling by a losing team. Elam proposed that his solution, which turns off the game clock, addresses these issues.

== History ==
=== The Basketball Tournament ===
In The Basketball Tournament, the game clock is turned off at the first whistle with under four minutes remaining. In 2017, The Basketball Tournament's play-in games utilized the Elam Ending rules. Since the 2018 edition, the Elam Ending has been used in all games. Originally, the target score was seven points more than team leading or tie score; since 2019, the target score is eight points more than the leading team's/tied score.

Starting with the 2020 tournament, a rule change was made in order to make a game-ending free throw slightly less likely. If the defensive team commits a non-shooting foul during the Elam Ending with the offensive team in the bonus, the offense receives one free throw plus possession. According to TBT organizers, this eliminated an incentive for teams to foul in one specific situation—when the defense could reach the target score with a free throw or two-point basket while the offense needed a three-pointer. The idea for this change came from a user that Elam interacted with on a message board.

Through the 2019 tournament, Jeremy Pargo of Overseas Elite was the TBT leader in making game-winning shots during the Elam Ending, with five (in the 2018 and 2019 tournaments, Overseas Elite won a total of 10 games). During the 2020 tournament, Golden Eagles forward Jamil Wilson tied his record and ultimately broke it in 2021.

=== Other uses ===
At the 2020 NBA All-Star Game, the Elam Ending was introduced after Chris Paul brought up the idea to NBA Commissioner Adam Silver. This version used an untimed fourth quarter, with the target score being 24 points more than the leading team's score after the third. The target score was chosen to honor Kobe Bryant, who was killed in a helicopter crash a month earlier; he wore 24 during his last 10 seasons with the Los Angeles Lakers. In 2020, Team LeBron won the game over Team Giannis 157–155 in a back-and-forth game. The Elam Ending format was received well by fans and players alike. It was used for later installments through 2023, but was removed for the 2024 edition. It was revived in 2026, albeit as overtime, with a target score of 5 points required for a team to win.

In 2020, the Canadian Elite Basketball League (CEBL) adopted the Elam Ending for its CEBL Summer Series tournament (played in lieu of the 2020 season due to the COVID-19 pandemic in Canada), using a target of nine points more than the leading team's score. The change was made permanent in 2021.

The NBA G League adopted the Elam Ending for its 2022–23 season under the name "Final Target Score". For regular-season games, the Elam Ending is implemented once a game goes to overtime, with the first team to score at least 7 points in overtime winning. Games during the G League Winter Showcase, held in December in Las Vegas, employed the Elam Ending after 3 quarters, with the target score set by adding 25 to the leading team's (or tied teams') score.

The World Basketball League (1988–1992) used a seven-point Elam period to decide games that were tied after four quarters of play.

Unrivaled uses an 11-point Elam period, which it calls "winning score", to replace the standard fourth quarter.

=== Soccer adaptation ===
In October 2022, the organizers of TBT announced that they would hold a spin-off seven-a-side soccer event, The Soccer Tournament (TST), in 2023. TST uses an adaptation of the Elam Ending: after two 20-minute halves, matches go into "Target Score Time", with a target of one goal more than the leading team's (or tied teams') score. Beginning at the fifth minute of Target Score Time, an outfield player (i.e., a player other than the goalkeeper) is removed from each side at 5-minute intervals until each side is reduced to 2 players or the winning goal is scored, whichever comes first. For the 2024 edition onwards, this was reduced from 5 minutes to 3 minutes.

== Disadvantages and concerns ==
In an article with Jeff Eisenberg of Yahoo Sports, NBA executives Kiki VanDeWeghe and Evan Wasch, who were at The Basketball Tournament 2018, have feared that the format will "eliminate the drama of overtime or the unrivaled excitement of a true buzzer beater". Mark Cuban, then-owner of the Dallas Mavericks, also stated he doesn't see the format being used in regular NBA games, but expects the league to utilize the format in "made-for-TV tournaments". Writing for FanSided, Joey Loose noted similar concerns for college basketball, as games such as the 2009 Connecticut vs. Syracuse men's basketball game, regarded among the best of all time, would have been cut short with the Elam Ending.

Critics have also claimed that teams would begin to commit fouls in the moments before the clock is turned off in order to create extra possessions while the clock still runs, hoping to shrink the deficit before the Elam Ending target is set, making it more reachable (thus counteracting the main strategy that the Elam Ending is purported to eliminate). Also, when an opponent is a threat to reach the target score with a three-pointer, the trailing team may commit an intentional foul before the opponent can shoot, as making the free throws will not end the game, thus guaranteeing at least one more offensive possession before the game ends.
