= The Basketball Tournament 2018 =

Single elimination basketball tournament

The Basketball Tournament
- 2018

Tournament information
- Dates: June 29–August 3, 2018
- Tournament format(s): Single elimination
- Host(s): (Washington (state)) Spokane, WA; (Wisconsin) Milwaukee, WI; (Virginia) Richmond, VA; (California) Los Angeles, CA; (New York (state)) Brooklyn, NY; (Ohio) Columbus, OH; (Georgia (U.S. state)) Atlanta, GA; (Maryland) Baltimore, MD
- Participants: 72
- Purse: US$2,000,000 winner-take-all

Final positions
- Champions: Overseas Elite
- Runner-up: Eberlein Drive

Tournament statistics
- MVP: D. J. Kennedy
- Top scorer(s): Jimmer Fredette (155 pts)
- Games played: 71

The Basketball Tournament 2018 was the fifth edition of The Basketball Tournament, a 5-on-5, single elimination basketball tournament broadcast by the ESPN family of networks. The tournament involved 72 teams; it started on June 29 and continued through August 3, 2018. The winner of the final, Overseas Elite, received a two million dollar prize.

== Format ==
The tournament started with a field of 72 teams, organized into four regions of 18 teams, all of which were seeded. The 18 teams in each region consisted of: nine teams selected based on fan popularity per the tournament's website, four teams selected via at-large bids, four teams accepted via buy-in of a $5000 fee, and the returning regional winner from the 2017 tournament.

2018 Regional winners
| Region | Team |
|---|---|
| Northeast | Boeheim's Army |
| Midwest | Scarlet & Gray |
| South | Overseas Elite |
| West | Team Challenge ALS |

=== Dunk contest ===
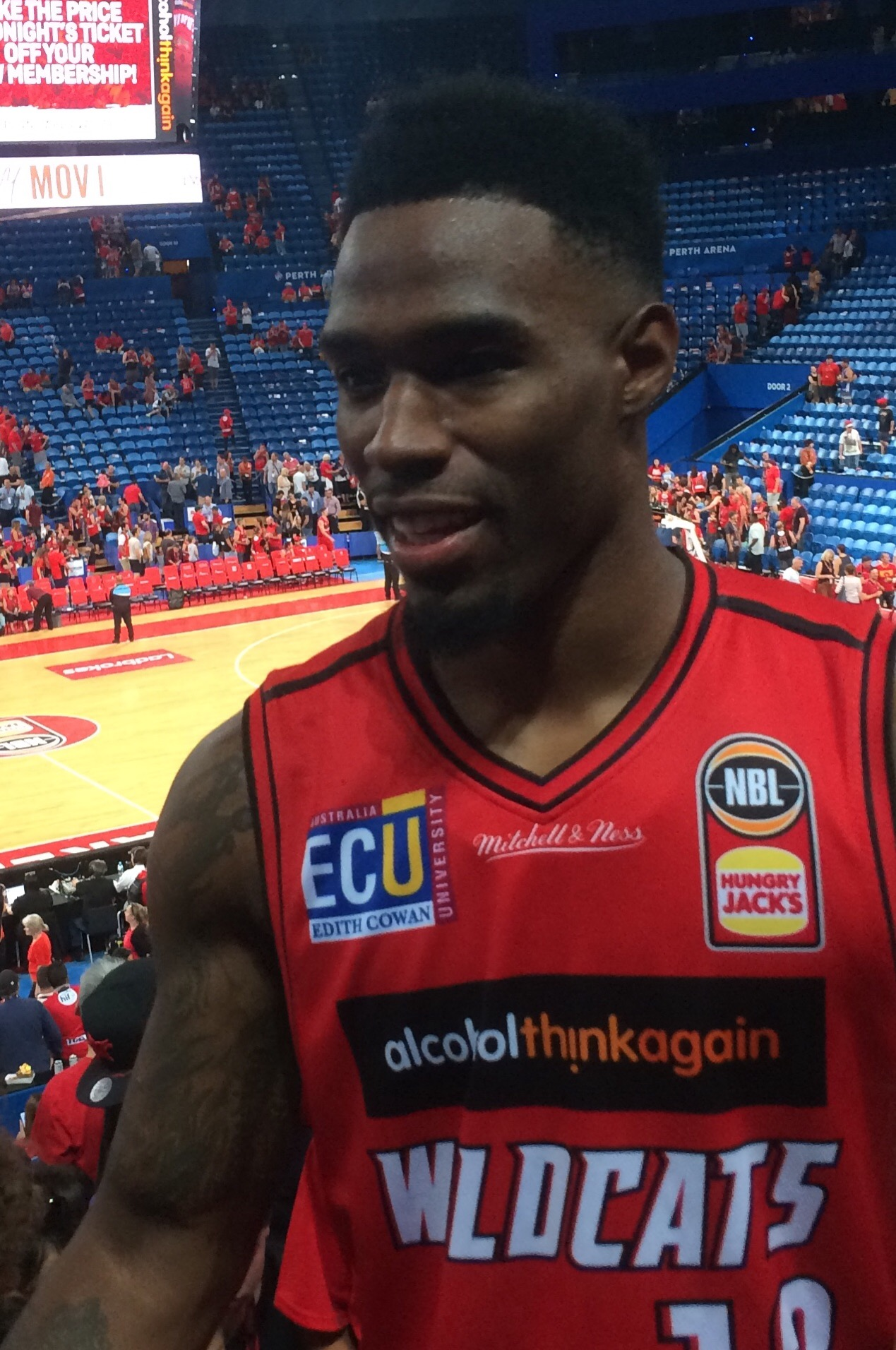
Derek Cooke

The Puma Hoops Dunk Contest was held during the Super 16 round, on July 27, with six contestants. There were four celebrity judges: Dominique Wilkins, Terry Rozier, God Shammgod, and Instagram personality @dunk. The contest winner was Marcus Lewis of Illinois BC, with Derek Cooke of Team Fredette as the runner-up; they were awarded prizes of $40,000 and $10,000, respectively.

== Venues ==
The Basketball Tournament 2018 took place in eight locations. Orange dots mark the locations of the two regional pods, red dots mark regional locations, the blue dot marks the Super 16 and quarterfinal location, and the green dot marks the semifinal and finals location.

== Alumni Teams ==
Multiple teams in the tournament were comprised mostly or exclusively of alumni of a particular school. These teams are listed below.

| Region | Seed | Team | School | Origins of name |
|---|---|---|---|---|
| Northeast | 1 | Boeheim's Army | Syracuse Orange | Syracuse head coach Jim Boeheim |
| Northeast | 3 | Golden Eagles | Marquette Golden Eagles | |
| Northeast | 5 | Gaelnation | Iona Gaels | |
| Northeast | 6 | Jack Attack | Georgetown Hoyas | Jack the Bulldog |
| Northeast | 7 | Team Arkansas | Arkansas Razorbacks | |
| Northeast | 9 | Saints Alive | Siena Saints | |
| Northeast | 11 | Hall In | Seton Hall Pirates | |
| Northeast | 14 | Johnnies | St. John's Red Storm | Common nickname |
| Midwest | 1 | Scarlet & Gray | Ohio State Buckeyes | Team colors |
| Midwest | 3 | Hilton Magic Legends | Iowa State Cyclones | Hilton Coliseum, Iowa State's home arena |
| Midwest | 5 | Always a Brave | Bradley Braves | |
| Midwest | 7 | Zoo Crew | Pittsburgh Panthers | Pitt's Oakland Zoo student section |
| Midwest | 8 | Bearcat Jam | Cincinnati Bearcats | |
| Midwest | 9 | Matadors | Texas Tech Red Raiders | School teams originally known as Matadors |
| South | 2 | Ram Nation | VCU Rams | |
| South | 3 | Memphis State | Memphis Tigers | Pre-1994 name of the University of Memphis |
| South | 5 | Wake Nation | Wake Forest Demon Deacons | |
| South | 7 | Blue Zoo | Middle Tennessee Blue Raiders | |
| South | 8 | Monarch Nation | Old Dominion Monarchs | |
| South | 9 | Hilltop Dawgs | UMBC Retrievers | Name derived from location |
| South | 10 | Purple & Black | Kansas State Wildcats | Team colors |
| West | 2 | Team Colorado | Colorado Buffaloes | |
| West | 3 | Gael Force | Saint Mary's Gaels | |
| West | 4 | Sons of Westwood | UCLA Bruins | One of UCLA's fight songs, from the campus location in Westwood |
| West | 5 | Forks Up | Arizona State Sun Devils | Pitchfork in mascot |
| West | 6 | Few Good Men | Gonzaga Bulldogs | Gonzaga head coach Mark Few |
| West | 11 | Team Utah | Utah Utes | |
| West | 14 | Air Force Bomb Squad | Air Force Falcons | |

Additionally, team We Are D3, the 13th seed in the West region, consisted of alumni from NCAA Division III programs.

== Schedule ==
Games televised on ESPN, ESPN2, or ESPNU, with game replays available on ESPN3.

| Round | Dates | Region | Location | Comment |
|---|---|---|---|---|
| Play-in | July 13 | West | Los Angeles | Seeds 15–18 |
| Play-in | July 13 | South | Richmond, Virginia | Seeds 15–18 |
| Play-in | July 20 | Northeast | Brooklyn | Seeds 15–18 |
| Play-in | July 20 | Midwest | Columbus, Ohio | Seeds 15–18 |
| Regional | June 29–30 | West | Spokane, Washington | Hoopfest Pod |
| Regional | July 14–15 | West | Los Angeles, California | |
| Regional | July 14–15 | South | Richmond, Virginia | |
| Regional | June 30–July 1 | Northeast | Milwaukee | Big East Pod |
| Regional | July 21–22 | Northeast | Brooklyn, New York | |
| Regional | July 21–22 | Midwest | Columbus, Ohio | |
| Super 16 | July 26–28 | | Atlanta | |
| Quarterfinals | July 29 | | Atlanta | |
| Semifinals | August 2 | | Baltimore | |
| Finals | August 3 | | Baltimore | |

== Bracket ==
All times Eastern. Source:

=== Northeast Region – Brooklyn, NY ===
| Play-in A July 20 |
| 15 | Talladega Knights | 81 |
| 18 | Queens Struggle | 69 |

| Play-in B July 20 |
| 16 | Philadelphia Stars | 68 |
| 17 | South Jamaica Kings | 73 |

Round 1 July 21; Brooklyn
1 | Boeheim's Army | 90
17 | South Jamaica Kings | 72
8 | Team Fancy | 85
9 | Saints Alive | 68
5 | Gaelnation | 100
12 | Sideline Cancer | 88
4 | Armored Athlete | 85
13 | DC on Point | 69
6 | Jack Attack | 77
11 | Hall In | 88
Big East Pod – Milwaukee, WI
3 | Golden Eagles | 78
14 | Johnnies | 67
7 | Team Arkansas | 85
10 | Tim Thomas Playaz | 62
2 | HBC Sicklerville | 60
15 | Talladega Knights | 80

Round 2 July 22; Brooklyn
1 | Boeheim's Army | 60
8 | Team Fancy | 55
5 | Gaelnation | 73
4 | Armored Athlete | 75
11 | Hall In | 76
3 | Golden Eagles | 96
7 | Team Arkansas | 74
15 | Talladega Knights | 91

Super 16; July 28; Atlanta
1 | Boeheim's Army | 73
4 | Armored Athlete | 69
3 | Golden Eagles | 73
15 | Talladega Knights | 66

Quarterfinals; July 29; Atlanta
1 | Boeheim's Army | 86
3 | Golden Eagles | 90

==== Northeast Regional Final ====
ESPN

July 29, 2018
1:00 p.m. EDT

Report

#1 Boeheim's Army 86, #3 Golden Eagles 90
Scoring by quarter: 25–19, 12–29, 29–19, 20–23
| Pts: Warrick – 24; Rebs: Triche – 8 Asts: Triche & Devendorf – 5 | Pts: Acker – 22; Rebs: McNeal – 8 Asts: McNeal & Diener – 6 |

GSU Sports Arena
Atlanta, Georgia
Referees: Antonio Petty, John Heatly, Byron Evans

=== Midwest Regional – Columbus, OH ===
| Play-in A July 20 |
| 15 | Peoria All Stars | 85 |
| 18 | West Coast Ronin | 62 |

| Play-in B July 20 |
| 16 | West Virginia Wildcats | 114 |
| 17 | Charlotte Chess Center | 87 |

Round 1 July 21; Columbus
1 | Scarlet & Gray | 99
16 | West Virginia Wildcats | 68
8 | Bearcat Jam | 63
9 | Matadors | 80
5 | Always a Brave | 64
12 | PrimeTime Players | 68
4 | Big X | 81
13 | Chattanooga Trenches | 79
6 | Fort Wayne Champs | 93
11 | The Region | 82
3 | Hilton Magic Legends | 63
14 | Illinois BC | 92
7 | Zoo Crew | 77
10 | Jackson TN Underdawgs | 86
2 | Team Fredette | 88
15 | Peoria All Stars | 80

Round 2 July 22; Columbus
1 | Scarlet & Gray | 82
9 | Matadors | 73
12 | PrimeTime Players | 70
4 | Big X | 67
6 | Fort Wayne Champs | 84
14 | Illinois BC | 66
10 | Jackson TN Underdawgs | 89
2 | Team Fredette | 99

Super 16; July 27; Atlanta
1 | Scarlet & Gray | 72
12 | PrimeTime Players | 60
6 | Fort Wayne Champs | 91
2 | Team Fredette | 104

Quarterfinals; July 29; Atlanta
1 | Scarlet & Gray | 78
2 | Team Fredette | 100

==== Midwest Regional Final ====
ESPN

July 29, 2018

Report

#1 Scarlet & Gray 78, #2 Team Fredette 100
Scoring by quarter: 17–21, 23–30, 23–25, 15–24
| Pts: Lighty – 16; Rebs: Sullinger – 8 Asts: Craft & Pigram – 3 | Pts: Fredette – 28; Rebs: Cooley – 7 Asts: Fredette – 7 |

GSU Sports Arena
Atlanta, Georgia
Referees: Derick Stafford, Anthony Jordan, Tommie Morrissey

=== South Regional – Richmond, VA ===
| Play-in A July 13 |
| 16 | Rock City Scorchers | 64 |
| 17 | Team ABC2 | 77 |

| Play-in B July 13 |
| 15 | Tampa 20/20 | 86 |
| 18 | Cancer +1 | 72 |

Round 1 July 14; Richmond
1 | Overseas Elite | 78
17 | Team ABC2 | 62
8 | Monarch Nation | 72
9 | Hilltop Dawgs | 59
5 | Wake the Nation | 55
12 | Showtime | 68
4 | Louisiana United | 86
13 | ATL All Stars | 69
6 | Team DRC | 84
11 | NC Prodigal Sons | 66
3 | Memphis State | 72
14 | Brooklyn Vultures | 63
7 | Atlanta Dirty South | 76
10 | Purple & Black | 74
2 | Ram Nation | 86
15 | Tampa 20/20 | 72

Round 2 July 15; Richmond
1 | Overseas Elite | 71
8 | Monarch Nation | 61
12 | Showtime | 61
4 | Louisiana United | 88
6 | Team DRC | 84
3 | Memphis State | 80
7 | Atlanta Dirty South | 71
2 | Ram Nation | 76

Super 16; July 26; Atlanta
1 | Overseas Elite | 87
4 | Louisiana United | 86
6 | Team DRC | 65
2 | Ram Nation | 78

Quarterfinals; July 29; Atlanta
1 | Overseas Elite | 72
2 | Ram Nation | 60

==== South Regional Final ====
ESPN2

July 29, 2018
11:00 a.m. EDT

Report

#1 Overseas Elite 72, #2 Ram Nation 60
Scoring by quarter: 18–13, 20–16, 18–22, 16–9
| Pts: Burrell – 15; Rebs: Kennedy & Burrell – 8 Asts: McCollum – 5 | Pts: Williams – 13; Rebs: Burgess & Williams – 5 Asts: Maynor – 5 |

GSU Sports Arena
Atlanta, Georgia
Referees: Orlandis Poole, Pat Evans, Archie Whaley

=== West Regional – Los Angeles, CA ===
| Play-in A July 13 |
| 15 | Kimchi Express | 104 |
| 18 | Dubois Dream | 96 |

| Play-in B July 13 |
| 16 | Utah Valor | 65 |
| 17 | Fort Hood Wounded Warriors | 98 |

Round 1 July 14; Los Angeles
1 | Team Challenge ALS | 83
17 | Fort Hood Wounded Warriors | 75
8 | Team 23 | 71
9 | CitiTeam Blazers | 82
5 | Forks Up | 75
12 | Albuquerque Hoops | 94
4 | Sons of Westwood | 90
13 | We Are D3 | 65
6 | Few Good Men | 84
11 | Team Utah | 83
Hoopfest Pod – Spokane, WA
3 | Gael Force | 82
14 | Air Force Bomb Squad | 54
7 | Eberlein Drive | 86
10 | Broad Street Brawlers | 71
2 | Team Colorado | 105
15 | Kimchi Express | 73

Round 2 July 15; Los Angeles
1 | Team Challenge ALS | 72
9 | CitiTeam Blazers | 59
12 | Albuquerque Hoops | 62
4 | Sons of Westwood | 76
6 | Few Good Men | 48
3 | Gael Force | 95
7 | Eberlein Drive | 83
2 | Team Colorado | 76

Super 16; July 28; Atlanta
1 | Team Challenge ALS | 86
4 | Sons of Westwood | 80
3 | Gael Force | 59
7 | Eberlein Drive | 72

Quarterfinals; July 29; Atlanta
1 | Team Challenge ALS | 67
7 | Eberlein Drive | 78

==== West Regional Final ====
ESPN2

July 29, 2018
7:00 p.m. EDT

Report

#1 Team Challenge ALS 67, #7 Eberlein Drive 78
Scoring by quarter: 12–17, 15–23, 23–24, 17–14
| Pts: Ware – 22; Rebs: Hamilton – 7 Asts: Hamilton & Rowland – 2 | Pts: Randle – 29; Rebs: Braun & Evans – 7 Asts: 3 players – 3 |

GSU Sports Arena
Atlanta, Georgia
Referees: Tony Greene, Chuck Jones, Sean Goode

=== Semifinals – Baltimore, MD ===
Semifinals; August 2 Baltimore
NE3 | Golden Eagles | 60
S1 | Overseas Elite | 85
MW2 | Team Fredette | 76
W7 | Eberlein Drive | 80

Final; August 3 Baltimore
S1 | Overseas Elite | 70
W7 | Eberlein Drive | 58

==== Semifinals ====
ESPN

August 2, 2018
7:00 p.m. EDT

Report

NE #3 Golden Eagles 60, S #1 Overseas Elite 85
Scoring by quarter: 13–28, 21–15, 22–21, 4–21
| Pts: Cook – 19; Rebs: Wilson & Blackledge – 4 Asts: Acker – 4 | Pts: Fogg – 38; Rebs: Kennedy – 12; Asts: Kennedy – 5 |

Talmadge L. Hill Field House
Baltimore, Maryland
Referees: Brian O'Connell, Jeff Clark, Jamie Luckie

ESPN

August 2, 2018
9:00 p.m. EDT

Report

MW #2 Team Fredette 76, W #7 Eberlein Drive 80
Scoring by quarter: 19–20, 13–21, 22–24, 22–15
| Pts: Fredette – 24; Rebs: Davies – 10; Asts: Fredette – 5 | Pts: Sloan – 20; Rebs: Evans – 7 Asts: Randle – 5 |

Talmadge L. Hill Field House
Baltimore, Maryland

==== Championship ====
ESPN

August 3, 2018
9:00 p.m. EDT

Report

S #1 Overseas Elite 70, W #7 Eberlein Drive 58
Scoring by quarter: 17–12, 18–21, 17–17, 18–8
| Pts: Burrell – 15; Rebs: Kennedy – 9 Asts: Kennedy – 4 | Pts: Randle & Sloan – 14; Rebs: Evans – 12; Asts: Sloan – 5 |

Talmadge L. Hill Field House
Baltimore, Maryland
Referees: Clarence Armstrong, Mike Eades, Jeff Anderson

== Awards ==
All Tournament Team
| Pos | Player | Team | PPG |
|---|---|---|---|
| F | D. J. Kennedy (MVP) | Overseas Elite | 14.3 |
| G | Errick McCollum | Overseas Elite | 12.8 |
| G | Jerome Randle | Eberlein Drive | 21.7 |
| G | Jimmer Fredette | Team Fredette | 31.0 |
| F | Jamil Wilson | Golden Eagles | 18.0 |
| GM | Matt Mitchell & Jacob Hirschmann | Eberlein Drive | — |
