= Nate Watson =

American basketball player (born 1998)

- Watson with Bursaspor Basketbol in 2026

Çayırova Belediyespor
- Position: Center
- League: Basketbol Süper Ligi

Personal information
- Born: October 19, 1998 (age 28) Portsmouth, Virginia, U.S.
- Listed height: 6 ft 10 in (2.08 m)
- Listed weight: 260 lb (118 kg)

Career information
- High school: Churchland (Portsmouth, Virginia); Capitol Christian Academy (Upper Marlboro, Maryland); Bishop O'Connell (Arlington, Virginia)
- College: Providence (2017–2022)
- NBA draft: 2022: undrafted
- Playing career: 2022–present

Career history
- 2022–2023: Nymburk
- 2023–2024: FMP
- 2024–2025: Karditsa
- 2025: Zaragoza
- 2025–2026: Panionios
- 2026: Bursaspor Basketbol
- 2026–present: Çayırova Belediye

Career highlights
- 2x Second-team All-Big East (2021, 2022); Big East All-Freshman Team (2018)
Medals
Representing the United States
Pan American Games
Bronze medal – third place	2019 Peru	Team

Junathaen D. "Nate" Watson Jr. (born October 19, 1998) is an American professional basketball player for Çayırova Belediyespor of the Basketbol Süper Ligi (BSL). He played college basketball for the Providence Friars.

== High school career ==
Watson played basketball for Capitol Christian Academy in Upper Marlboro, Maryland before moving to Bishop O'Connell High School in Arlington, Virginia. His transfer was hindered by a financial dispute involving his former school, causing him to miss three days of school. At Bishop O'Connell, Watson was a two-time First Team All-Washington Catholic Athletic Conference selection. He competed for DC Premier on the Amateur Athletic Union circuit. A consensus four-star recruit, he committed to playing college basketball for Providence over offers from Maryland, NC State and Miami (Florida).

== College career ==
As a freshman at Providence, Watson averaged 6.8 points and 1.9 rebounds per game and was named to the Big East All-Freshman Team. In his sophomore season, he averaged 11.7 points and 5.2 rebounds per game. He missed the beginning of his junior season with a knee injury, averaging nine points and 4.6 rebounds per game. Watson assumed a leading role in his senior season. On February 6, 2021, he recorded a career-high 30 points and eight rebounds in a 92–81 loss to St. John's. As a senior, Watson averaged 16.9 points and 6.7 rebounds per game, earning Second Team All-Big East honors. He opted to return to Providence for a fifth season, using an extra year of eligibility granted due to the COVID-19 pandemic. Watson was again named to the Second Team All-Big East.

== Professional career ==
=== ERA Basketball Nymburk (2022–2023) ===
On August 3, 2022, he signed with ERA Nymburk of the Czech National Basketball League.

=== AS Karditsa Iaponiki (2024–2025) ===
On June 26, 2024, Watson signed with Greek club Karditsa. On December 3, 2024, Watson received a Hoops Agents Player of the Week award for Round 8. He had a game-high 22 points and 9 rebounds.

=== Casademont Zaragoza (2025) ===
On February 10, 2025, Watson signed with Basket Zaragoza of the Liga ACB until 2027. He was brought in the club as a replacement for Jilson Bango.

=== Panionios (2025–2026) ===
On August 6, 2025, Watson joined Panionios of the Greek Basket League, on loan from Zaragoza.

=== Bursaspor Basketbol (2026) ===
On August 16, 2026, he signed with Bursaspor Basketbol of the Basketbol Süper Ligi (BSL).

=== Çayırova Belediyespor (2026–present) ===
On November 19, 2026, he signed with Çayırova Belediyespor of the Basketbol Süper Ligi (BSL).

== National team career ==
Watson represented the United States at the 2019 Pan American Games in Peru, helping his team win the bronze medal.

== Career statistics ==
Legend
GP	Games played	GS	Games started	MPG	Minutes per game
FG%	Field goal percentage	3P%	3-point field goal percentage	FT%	Free throw percentage
RPG	Rebounds per game	APG	Assists per game	SPG	Steals per game
BPG	Blocks per game	PPG	Points per game	**Bold**	Career high

=== College ===
Year	Team	GP	GS	MPG	FG%	3P%	FT%	RPG	APG	SPG	BPG	PPG
2017–18	Providence	**35**	9	13.8	.595	–	**.696**	1.9	.1	.2	.7	6.8
2018–19	Providence	34	20	23.5	.590	.000	.652	5.2	.4	.3	.7	11.7
2019–20	Providence	27	13	18.9	.511	–	.565	4.6	.5	**.6**	.6	9.0
2020–21	Providence	26	26	**32.3**	**.602**	–	.627	**6.7**	**.7**	.3	**1.0**	**16.9**
2021–22	Providence	33	**33**	28.0	.548	–	.583	5.2	.5	.3	.7	13.3
Career		155	101	22.9	.570	.000	.623	4.6	.4	.3	.7	11.3
