= Brandon Jefferson =

American basketball player (born 1991)

Brandon "Ökkeş" Jefferson
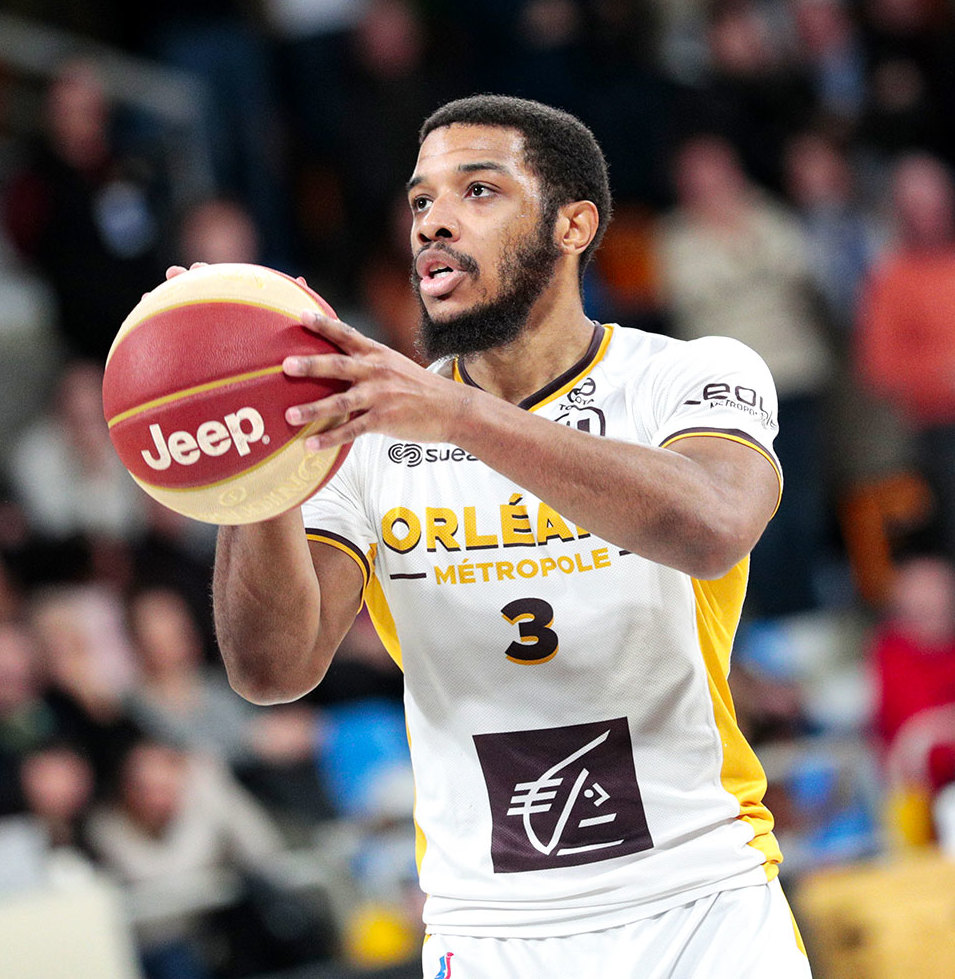
- Jefferson with Orléans Loiret in 2019

Kipas Istiklal
- Position: Point guard
- League: TBL

Personal information
- Born: November 25, 1991 (age 34) Flower Mound, Texas, U.S.
- Listed height: 5 ft 9 in (1.75 m)
- Listed weight: 172 lb (78 kg)

Career information
- High school: Lewisville (Lewisville, Texas)
- College: MSU Denver (2010–2014)
- NBA draft: 2014: undrafted
- Playing career: 2014–present

Career history
- 2014–2015: KTP
- 2015–2016: Phoenix Hagen
- 2016–2017: Union Olimpija
- 2017–2018: Pallacanestro Trapani
- 2018–2020: Orléans Loiret
- 2020–2021: SIG Strasbourg
- 2021–2022: Élan Béarnais
- 2022–2023: Tianjin Pioneers
- 2023: Shaanxi Wolves
- 2023–2024: Dinamo Sassari
- 2024–2025: JL Bourg
- 2025–2026: Karditsa
- 2026: Gran Canaria
- 2026–present: Kipas Istiklal

Career highlights
- French Cup winner (2022); LNB Pro A Top Scorer (2022); LNB Pro B Most Valuable Player (2019); 1. SKL champion (2017); Slovenian Cup winner (2017); NABC Division II Player of the Year (2014); RMAC Player of the Year (2014); 2× First-team All-RMAC (2013, 2014)

Brandon Jefferson (born 25 November 1991) is an American professional basketball player for Kipas Istiklal of the Türkiye Basketbol Ligi (TBL). He played college basketball for the MSU Denver Roadrunners.

== Professional career ==
After going undrafted in the 2014 NBA draft, Jefferson joined the Denver Nuggets for the 2014 NBA Summer League. In July 2014, Jefferson signed his first professional contract with Finnish club KTP-Basket.

In July 2015, Jefferson signed with German Club Phoenix Hagen.

On September 2, 2016, Jefferson signed a one-year deal with Slovenian club Union Olimpija.

On July 18, 2017, he signed a one-year deal with Italian club Pallacanestro Trapani.

Jefferson signed a deal with Orléans Loiret Basket of the French second division LNB Pro B on August 9, 2018. He was named the Pro B Most Valuable Player of the 2018–19 season. During the 2019–20 season, Jefferson averaged 16.1 points and 3.9 assists per game. On August 30, 2020, he signed with SIG Strasbourg. Jefferson averaged 16.2 points and 3.4 assists per game.

On August 9, 2021, he signed a two-year deal with Élan Béarnais.

On June 11, 2022, he signed with Tianjin Pioneers of the Chinese Basketball Association.

On December 23, 2023, he signed with Dinamo Sassari of the Lega Basket Serie A (LBA).

On December 18, 2024, he signed with JL Bourg of the LNB Pro A.

On August 8, 2025, Jefferson signed with Greek club Karditsa.

On April 27, 2026, Jefferson signed with Dreamland Gran Canaria of the Liga ACB.
