= 2018 FIBA Asia Champions Cup =

27th Asia Champions Cup

Tournament details
- Host country: Thailand
- Dates: 27 September–2 October
- Teams: 8
- Venue(s): 1 (in 1 host city)

Final positions
- Champions: Iran (Petrochimi's 1st title; Iran's 6th title)

Tournament statistics
- Games played: 32
- MVP: (Japan) Daiki Tanaka
- Top scorer: (United States) Keene (28.2) (United States) Singletary
- Top rebounds: (United States) Singletary (16.4)
- Top assists: (Chinese Taipei) Peng (6.3)
- PPG (Team): (Thailand) Mono Vampire (98.4)
- RPG (Team): (Iran) Petrochimi (50.8)
- APG (Team): (Chinese Taipei) Pauian (21.6)

Official website
- 2018 FIBA Asia Champions Cup

The 2018 FIBA Asia Champions Cup was the 27th staging of the FIBA Asia Champions Cup, the international basketball club tournament of FIBA Asia. The tournament, which was originally scheduled to be hosted by China, took place in Thailand from 27 September to 2 October 2018. Games were played at Stadium29 in Nonthaburi.

== Qualification ==
Starting this year, there are a lot of changes in the qualification leading to the main tournament:

- There will be several qualifying rounds spread all across the continent, having the sub-zones scheduled their own qualifiers.
- One unique difference is some of Asia's top professional leagues will have their representatives already seeded in the Final Eight. China's Chinese Basketball Association, South Korea's Korean Basketball League, Japan's B.League and the Philippines' Philippine Basketball Association all have Direct Qualifying Spots to the Final 8.

Already qualified to the main tournament are the following nations:

- (China) Liaoning Flying Leopards (2017–18 CBA season champions)
- (South Korea) Seoul SK Knights (2017–18 KBL season champions)
- (Japan) Alvark Tokyo (2017–18 B.League season champions)
- (Philippines) Meralco Bolts (PBA representatives)
- (Chinese Taipei) Pauian (East Inter-Sub Zone qualifier)
- (Thailand) Mono Vampire (East Inter-Sub Zone qualifier)
- (Lebanon) Sporting Al Riyadi Beirut (West Inter-Sub Zone qualifier)
- (Iran) Petrochimi Bandar Imam BC (West Inter-Sub Zone qualifier)

== Host ==
The Basketball Association of Thailand was awarded the hosting duties. They assigned to Stadium 29 in the Bangkok suburb of Nonthaburi as the host of the tournament. The arena is the home of Mono Vampire in the Thailand Basketball League and in the ASEAN Basketball League.

== Draw ==
The draw was held on September 14, at Stadium 29 at Nonthaburi. The eight teams were divided into two groups. Hosts Mono Vampire chose their own group after three teams were drawn.

== Group phase ==
All times at Thailand Standard Time (UTC+7)

=== Group A ===
Pos	Team	Pld	W	L	PF	PA	PD	Pts	Qualification
1	(Iran) Petrochimi	3	3	0	281	194	+87	6	Final round
2	(South Korea) Seoul SK Knights	3	2	1	259	210	+49	5	Final round
3	(Chinese Taipei) Pauian	3	1	2	251	247	+4	4	Classification round
4	(China) Liaoning Flying Leopards	3	0	3	182	322	−140	3	Classification round

Source: FIBA
Rules for classification: 1) Tournament points; 2) Head-to-head results; 3) Head-to-head points difference; 4) Head-to-head points scored; 5) Overall points difference 6) Overall points scored; 7) Random draw

27 September
13:00

Box score

Pauian (Chinese Taipei)	106–62	(China) Liaoning Flying Leopards
Scoring by quarter: 29–13, 31–13, 20–16, 24–20
Pts: Jones 22; Rebs: Rhett 11; Asts: Peng 7		Pts: Ma, Wu 12; Rebs: Wu 9 Asts: Ma 4

Stadium 29, Nonthaburi
Referees: Yevgeniy Mikheyev (KAZ), Yuji Higashi (JPN), Glenn Cornelio (PHI)

27 September
18:00

Box score

Seoul SK Knights (South Korea)	62–77	(Iran) Petrochimi
Scoring by quarter: 7–24, 9–17, 18–20, 28–16
Pts: Summers 21; Rebs: Summers 4 Asts: Choi W.H. 3		Pts: Aslani 20; Rebs: Kazemi 17; Asts: Yakhchali 10

Stadium 29, Nonthaburi
Referees: Ricor Buaron (PHI), Preeda Muongmee (THA), Tomohiro Hosoda (JPN)

28 September
18:00

Box score

Pauian (Chinese Taipei)	63–96	(Iran) Petrochimi
Scoring by quarter: 19–26, 12–25, 17–28, 15–17
Pts: Jones 14; Rebs: Rhett 9 Asts: Chien, Peng 4		Pts: Yakhchali 28; Rebs: Mirzaei 10; Asts: Yakhchali 8

Stadium 29, Nonthaburi
Referees: Ricor Buaron (PHI), Yuji Higashi (JPN), Leong Chuen Wing (SIN)

28 September
20:30

Box score

Liaoning Flying Leopards (China)	51–108	(South Korea) Seoul SK Knights
Scoring by quarter: 18–28, 7–19, 14–33, 12–28
Pts: Guo 14; Rebs: Wu 15; Asts: Wang J., Zhou 2		Pts: Byun 22; Rebs: Choi W.H., Kim M.S. 8 Asts: Byun 6

Stadium 29, Nonthaburi
Referees: Tomohiro Hosoda (JPN), Glenn Cornelio (PHI), Preeda Muongmee (THA)

29 September
13:00

Box score

Seoul SK Knights (South Korea)	89–82	(Chinese Taipei) Pauian
Scoring by quarter: 18–25, 29–23, 21–21, 22–13
Pts: Summers 37; Rebs: Summers 13; Asts: Byun 6		Pts: Jones 29; Rebs: Rhett 11; Asts: Peng 8

Stadium 29, Nonthaburi
Referees: Glenn Cornelio (PHI), Yuji Higashi (JPN), Mohammad Fawzi Taha (JOR)

29 September
18:00

Box score

Petrochimi (Iran)	108–69	(China) Liaoning Flying Leopards
Scoring by quarter: 24–13, 29–16, 27–22, 28–18
Pts: Aslani 26; Rebs: Mashayekhi, Mirzaei 10; Asts: Mashayekhi 9		Pts: Guo 21; Rebs: Guo 5 Asts: three players 3

Stadium 29, Nonthaburi
Referees: Ricor Buaron (PHI), Leong Chuen Wing (SIN), Tomohiro Hosoda (JPN)

=== Group B ===
Pos	Team	Pld	W	L	PF	PA	PD	Pts	Qualification
1	(Japan) Alvark Tokyo	3	3	0	279	249	+30	6	Final round
2	(Philippines) Meralco Bolts	3	1	2	261	247	+14	4 (Note: Meralco 1–1, +25 PD; Mono 1–1, +2 PD; Al Riyadi 1–1, –27 PD)	Final round
3	(Thailand) Mono Vampire (H)	3	1	2	300	306	−6	4	Classification round
4	(Lebanon) Al Riyadi	3	1	2	245	283	−38	4	Classification round

Source: FIBA
Rules for classification: 1) Tournament points; 2) Head-to-head results; 3) Head-to-head points difference; 4) Head-to-head points scored; 5) Overall points difference; 6) Overall points scored; 7) Random draw
(H) Hosts
Notes:

27 September
15:30

Box score

Meralco Bolts (Philippines)	92–100	(Thailand) Mono Vampire
Scoring by quarter: 28–21, 22–26, 20–23, 22–30
Pts: Stone 23; Rebs: Durham 18; Asts: four players 3		Pts: Keene 29; Rebs: Singletary 15; Asts: Keene 8

Stadium 29, Nonthaburi
Referees: Hwang In-tae (KOR), Yuen Chun Yip (HKG), Mohammad Doost (IRI)

27 September
20:30

Box score

Al Riyadi (Lebanon)	76–87	(Japan) Alvark Tokyo
Scoring by quarter: 18–21, 14–20, 24–21, 20–25
Pts: Lyons 23; Rebs: Abdel Moneim 12; Asts: Akl, Saoud 4		Pts: Kirk 29; Rebs: Kirk 13; Asts: Ando, Kikuchi 5

Stadium 29, Nonthaburi
Referees: Park Kyoung-jin (KOR), Mohammadreza Salehian (IRI), Kim Jong-kuk (KOR)

28 September
13:00

Box score

Alvark Tokyo (Japan)	84–73	(Philippines) Meralco Bolts
Scoring by quarter: 19–17, 16–20, 25–19, 24–17
Pts: Kirk 23; Rebs: Kirk 11; Asts: Tanaka 7		Pts: Durham 31; Rebs: Durham 12; Asts: Amer 7

Stadium 29, Nonthaburi
Referees: Hwang In-tae (KOR), Mohammadreza Salehian (IRI), Sadegh Ghanbaridamanab (IRI)

28 September
15:30

Box score

Al Riyadi (Lebanon)	106–100 (OT)	(Thailand) Mono Vampire
Scoring by quarter: 27–22, 19–26, 22–14, 19–25, Overtime: 19–13
Pts: Saoud 30; Rebs: Bawji 16; Asts: Lyons 10		Pts: Singletary 30; Rebs: Singletary 20; Asts: Keene 8

Stadium 29, Nonthaburi
Referees: Yevgeniy Mikheyev (KAZ), Park Kyoung-jin (KOR), Mohammad Fawzi Taha (JOR)

29 September
13:00

Box score

Mono Vampire (Thailand)	100–108	(Japan) Alvark Tokyo
Scoring by quarter: 16–21, 26–25, 32–35, 26–27
Pts: Singletary 44; Rebs: Singletary 13; Asts: Keene 4		Pts: Kirk 28; Rebs: Kirk 10; Asts: Kikuchi 5

Stadium 29, Nonthaburi
Referees: Sadegh Ghanbaridamanab (IRI), Yuen Chun Yip (HKG), Mohammad Doost (IRI)

29 September
20:30

Box score

Meralco Bolts (Philippines)	96–63	(Lebanon) Al Riyadi
Scoring by quarter: 23–26, 26–7, 23–16, 24–14
Pts: Lanete, Stone 20; Rebs: Durham 14; Asts: Stone 5		Pts: Bawji 19; Rebs: Ziade 10; Asts: Saoud 3

Stadium 29, Nonthaburi
Referees: Yevgeniy Mikheyev (KAZ), Hwang In-tae (KOR), Kim Jong-kuk (KOR)

== Classification round ==
5–8th place semifinals
1 October–13:00
(Chinese Taipei) Pauian	100
(Lebanon) Al Riyadi	87
1 October–15:30
(Thailand) Mono Vampire	95
(China) Liaoning Flying Leopards	71

Fifth place
2 October–15:30
(Chinese Taipei) Pauian	96
(Thailand) Mono Vampire	97
Seventh place
2 October–13:00
(Lebanon) Al Riyadi	102
(China) Liaoning Flying Leopards	75

=== 5th-8th semifinals ===
1 October
13:00

Box score

Pauian (Chinese Taipei)	100–87	(Lebanon) Al Riyadi
Scoring by quarter: 19–20, 25–24, 31–20, 25–23
Pts: Jones 29; Rebs: Rhett 12; Asts: Wu C.C. 9		Pts: Bawji 23; Rebs: Bawji 17; Asts: Lyons 6

Stadium 29, Nonthaburi
Referees: Mohammadreza Salehian (IRI), Mohammad Doost (IRI), Sadegh Ghanbaridamanab (IRI)

1 October
15:30

Box score

Mono Vampire (Thailand)	95–71	(China) Liaoning Flying Leopards
Scoring by quarter: 28–25, 30–10, 19–16, 18–20
Pts: Keene, Singletary 19; Rebs: Singletary 15; Asts: Singletary 6		Pts: Ma 25; Rebs: Wu 12; Asts: Guo 6

Stadium 29, Nonthaburi
Referees: Ricor Buaron (PHI), Glenn Cornelio (PHI), Kim Jong-kuk (KOR)

=== Seventh place game ===
2 October
13:00

Box score

Al Riyadi (Lebanon)	102–75	(China) Liaoning Flying Leopards
Scoring by quarter: 33–15, 14–21, 30–23, 25–16
Pts: Saoud 50; Rebs: Bawji 12; Asts: El Khatib 4		Pts: Ma 18; Rebs: Wu 12; Asts: Guo 5

Stadium 29, Nonthaburi
Referees: Sadegh Ghanbaridamanab (IRI), Mohammad Doost (IRI), Tomohiro Hosoda (JPN)

=== Fifth place game ===
2 October
15:30

Box score

Pauian (Chinese Taipei)	96–97	(Thailand) Mono Vampire
Scoring by quarter: 21–28, 25–24, 29–16, 21–29
Pts: Jones 32; Rebs: Jones 16; Asts: Shih 5		Pts: Keene 32; Rebs: Singletary 19; Asts: Keene 5

Stadium 29, Nonthaburi
Referees: Park Kyoung-jin (KOR), Yuji Higashi (JPN), Mohammad Fawzi Taha (JOR)

== Final round ==
Semifinals
1 October–18:00
(Iran) Petrochimi	79
(Philippines) Meralco Bolts	74
1 October–20:30
(Japan) Alvark Tokyo	78
(South Korea) Seoul SK Knights	54

Gold medal game
2 October–20:30
(Iran) Petrochimi	68
(Japan) Alvark Tokyo	64
Bronze medal game
2 October–18:00
(Philippines) Meralco Bolts	87
(South Korea) Seoul SK Knights	91

=== Semifinals ===
1 October
18:00

Box score

Petrochimi (Iran)	79–74	(Philippines) Meralco Bolts
Scoring by quarter: 16–18, 17–16, 21–21, 25–19
Pts: Yakhchali 29; Rebs: Kazemi 14; Asts: Mashayekhi 5		Pts: Durham 27; Rebs: Durham 11; Asts: Amer, Durham 4

Stadium 29, Nonthaburi
Referees: Budi Marfan (INA), Yuen Chun Yip (HKG), Preeda Muongmee (THA)

1 October
20:30

Box score

Alvark Tokyo (Japan)	78–54	(South Korea) Seoul SK Knights
Scoring by quarter: 23–8, 19–17, 16–13, 20–16
Pts: Kirk 23; Rebs: Bjelica, Kirk 10; Asts: Tanaka 5		Pts: Summers 28; Rebs: Summers 10; Asts: Lee 3

Stadium 29, Nonthaburi
Referees: Yevgeniy Mikheyev (KAZ), Leong Chuen Wing (SIN), Mohammad Fawzi Taha (JOR)

=== Third place game ===
2 October
18:00

Box score

Meralco Bolts (Philippines)	87–91	(South Korea) Seoul SK Knights
Scoring by quarter: 25–27, 13–19, 25–16, 24–29
Pts: Stone 32; Rebs: Stone 13; Asts: Durham 5		Pts: Summers 26; Rebs: Kim M.S. 8 Asts: Choi W.H. 8

Stadium 29, Nonthaburi
Referees: Budi Marfan (INA), Preeda Muongmee (THA), Mohammadreza Salehian (IRI)

=== Final ===
2 October
20:30

Box score

Petrochimi (Iran)	68–64	(Japan) Alvark Tokyo
Scoring by quarter: 8–16, 22–11, 18–14, 20–23
Pts: Mirzaei 28; Rebs: Kazemi 14; Asts: Yakhchali 4		Pts: Tanaka 28; Rebs: Kirk 9 Asts: Baba 4

Stadium 29, Nonthaburi
Referees: Ricor Buaron (PHI), Hwang In-tae (KOR), Kim Jong-kuk (KOR)

== Final ranking ==
Rank	Team	Record
1st place, gold medalist(s)	(Iran) Petrochimi	5–0
2nd place, silver medalist(s)	(Japan) Alvark Tokyo	4–1
3rd place, bronze medalist(s)	(South Korea) Seoul SK Knights	3–2
4th	(Philippines) Meralco Bolts	1–4
5th	(Thailand) Mono Vampire	3–2
6th	(Chinese Taipei) Pauian	2–3
7th	(Lebanon) Al Riyadi	2–3
8th	(China) Liaoning Flying Leopards	0–5

== Awards ==
2018 FIBA Asia Champions Cup

Petrochimi Bandar Imam BC
1st title

Most Valuable Player
(Japan) Daiki Tanaka

=== All-Star Five ===
Pos	Player	Club
G	(Japan) Daiki Tanaka (MVP)	(Japan) Alvark Tokyo
G	(Iran) Behnam Yakhchali	(Iran) Petrochimi Bandar Imam BC
C	(United States) Alex Kirk	(Japan) Alvark Tokyo
F	(United States) Mike Singletary	(Thailand) Mono Vampire
F	(United States) Dajuan Summers	(South Korea) Seoul SK Knights
