= The Basketball Tournament 2025 =

Single elimination basketball tournament

The Basketball Tournament
- 2025
- 2025 championship game logo

Tournament information
- Location: Charleston, West Virginia; Harrisonburg, Virginia; Indianapolis,Indiana; Kansas City, Missouri; Lexington, Kentucky; Louisville, Kentucky; Syracuse, New York; Wichita, Kansas; Semifinals sites: Charleston, West Virginia; Wichita, Kansas; Championship site: Charles Koch Arena (Wichita, Kansas)
- Dates: July 18–August 3, 2025
- Tournament format: Single elimination
- Participants: 61 teams
- Purse: Championship: US$1,000,000 winner-take-all

Final positions
- Champions: AfterShocks
- Runner-up: Eberlein Drive

Tournament statistics
- MVP: Marcus Keene
- Top scorer: Gabe York (114)
- Games played: 60

The Basketball Tournament 2025 was the twelfth edition of The Basketball Tournament (TBT), a 5-on-5, single elimination basketball tournament with a $1 million winner-take-all prize. The tournament, involving 61 teams, began on July 18 and ended on August 3. The tournament format was similar to that of the last edition in 2024 with teams playing in one of eight regionals. Twenty-six games were broadcast live on FOX, FS1, and FS2. Other games were streamed on YouTube.

== Format ==
For its 2025 edition, TBT modified its traditional 64-team format, with first round byes in the seven-team regions. Each regional will be held at a single host site (similar in format to the NCAA Division II men's and women's tournaments). The first region to sell 4000 tickets (Louisville) earned homecourt advantage throughout the tournament, with other regions receiving similar home court advantages for ticket sales.

The teams and the regional placements for all entrants were revealed on June 24, 2025.

As with previous years, all tournament games operate with the "Elam Ending", a format of ending the game without use of a game clock. Under the Elam Ending, the clock is turned off at the first dead-ball whistle with 4 minutes or less to play in the game. At that time, a target score, equal to the score of the leading team (or tied teams) plus eight, is set, and the first team to reach this target score is declared the winner of the game. Thus, all games end on a made basket (field goal or free throw) and there is no overtime.

== Venues ==
The Basketball Tournament 2025 featured games in eight locations. Official regional names, if different from the location names, are indicated in the listings below the location names.

Regional sites Regional and quarterfinal sites	Indianapolis	James Madison (Harrisonburg, VA)	Kansas City
Regional sites Regional and quarterfinal sites	Hinkle Fieldhouse	Atlantic Union Bank Center	Municipal Arena
Regional sites Regional and quarterfinal sites	Capacity: 12,012	Capacity: 8,500	Capacity: 7,300
Regional sites Regional and quarterfinal sites	Lexington	Louisville	Wichita
Regional sites Regional and quarterfinal sites	Memorial Coliseum	Freedom Hall	Charles Koch Arena
Regional sites Regional and quarterfinal sites	Capacity: 6,250	Capacity: 18,865	Capacity: 10,506
Regional sites Regional and quarterfinal sites	Syracuse	West Virginia (Charleston, WV)	
Regional sites Regional and quarterfinal sites	SRC Arena	Charleston Coliseum	
Regional sites Regional and quarterfinal sites	Capacity: 6,500	Capacity: 11,519	

== Teams ==
TBT has a history of teams rostered primarily with alumni from specific NCAA Division I college basketball programs; 23 such teams entered the 2025 tournament. One is drawn from NCAA Division III alumni.

Name	College or sponsor affiliation	Source of team name	Region
AfterShocks	Wichita State alumni	Wichita State Shockers school nickname	Wichita
All Good Dawgs	Butler alumni	Butler Bulldogs mascot	Indianapolis
Assembly Ball	Indiana alumni	Assembly Hall home arena	Indianapolis
Austin's Own	Texas alumni	School location in Austin	Wichita
Best Virginia	West Virginia alumni		West Virginia
Boeheim's Army	Syracuse alumni	Former Syracuse head coach Jim Boeheim	Syracuse
Boston vs Cancer	—		Louisville
Brown Ballers	—	Made up of brown athletes	Syracuse
Carmen's Crew	Ohio State alumni	"Carmen Ohio", Ohio State's school song	Indianapolis
Challenge ALS		Raising awareness for ALS	Wichita
Court Street Kings (Note: Known in previous TBT editions as Ohio 1804.)	Ohio alumni	Court Street runs through the Ohio University campus	West Virginia
DaGuys STL	—	Team YouTube channel, with players mainly from Greater St. Louis	Kansas City
Dubois Dream	—	Based out of Dubois, Pennsylvania	West Virginia
Dunkin' Dogs	Louisiana Tech alumni	Louisiana Tech Bulldogs mascot	Lexington
Eberlein Drive	—	Team owners' home street	Lexington
Elite Nation (Note: Known in previous TBT editions as Takeover BC.)	—		West Virginia
Fail Harder	—		Indianapolis
Fire Family	Sovereign Bank	TBL team Potawatomi Fire	Wichita
Florida DRC	Dominique Rodgers-Cromartie	Combined from Florida TNT and Team DRC from previous TBT editions.	Louisville
Forever Coogs	Houston alumni	Houston Cougars mascot	Wichita
Fort Wayne Champs	—	Players with connections to Fort Wayne, Indiana	Indianapolis
Founding Fathers	James Madison alumni	James Madison University named after a Founding Father of the United States	James Madison
GoTime Green Machine	TBL team Lebanon Leprechauns		Indianapolis
Green Mountain Men	Vermont alumni	Green Mountains run through Vermont	Syracuse
Happy Valley Hoopers	Penn State alumni	Location of the school in Happy Valley	James Madison
Heartfire	MedImpact	Arizona nonprofit HeartFire Missions, a provider of Christian medical mission trips	Kansas City
Herd That	Marshall alumni	Marshall Thundering Herd school nickname	West Virginia
Herkimer Originals	—	ABA team from Herkimer, New York	Syracuse
JHX Hoops	Kansas alumni	Variation of the Kansas Jayhawks mascot name	Kansas City
La Familia	Kentucky alumni	2009-24 Kentucky coach John Calipari's Italian heritage; also name of a UK basketball NIL collective	Lexington
Layne's Hope	—	A young man with Prader–Willi syndrome	Syracuse
Locked In Elite	—		Indianapolis
Los Angeles Ignite	—	TBL team from Los Angeles	Louisville
Love Virginia	—		James Madison
Madd Katts	—		Louisville
Magic Show	—		James Madison
No Excuses (Note: Known in previous TBT editions as Competitive Choice.)	—		Wichita
NXT Era Elite (Note: Known in previous TBT editions as Big 5.)	—		James Madison
OffDaHook	—		Kansas City
Purple Reign	Kansas State alumni	Kansas State University school colors	Kansas City
Raleigh 919 Legends	—	Raleigh, North Carolina area code 919	James Madison
Red Rose Thunder	—	ECBL team from Lancaster, Pennsylvania	James Madison
Richards Elite	—	Ryan Richards	Lexington
Rise & Grind	—		Syracuse
Run DFW	—	Based in the Dallas-Fort Worth area	Wichita
Sheffield Sharks	B. Braun	Team based in Sheffield, England	Kansas City
Shell Shock	Maryland alumni	Associated with the Maryland Terrapins mascot	James Madison
Shield 219 (Note: Known in previous TBT editions as The Cru.)	Valparaiso alumni	Valparaiso, Indiana area code 219	Indianapolis
Sideline Cancer	—	Pancreatic cancer awareness	Louisville
Sikh Warriors	Singh Ahluwalia		West Virginia
Stars of Storrs	UConn alumni	Charles and Augustus Storrs, establishers of the Storrs Agricultural School (now the University of Connecticut)	Syracuse
Stroh's Squad	Bowling Green alumni	Stroh Center, Bowling Green home arena	Lexington
Tampa Florida Pickup Basketball	—	Players from the Tampa, Florida area	Lexington
Team 901	—	Memphis, Tennessee area code 901	Louisville
Team Diesel	—	Shaquille O'Neal's DJ name	Louisville
The Nawf	—	Team representing Gwinnett County, Georgia also known as "Nawf" Atlanta	West Virginia
The Shine	—		Kansas City
The Ville	Louisville alumni	City nickname	Louisville
War Ready	Auburn alumni	School battle cry "War Eagle"	Lexington
We Are D3	NCAA Division III alumni		Syracuse
X-Rayted	Primetime Radiology, LLC		Lexington

Note: team names are per the TBT bracket; some names have slight variation on TBT website pages.

== Tournament bracket ==
Seven of the eight no. 1 seeds advanced to the second-round, with no. 8 Raleigh 919 Legends upsetting Happy Valley Hoopers in the James Madison Regional.

Five no. 1 seeds advanced in second-round play; the lowest seeds to advance to the third round was no. 7 LA Ignite from the Louisville Regional and Fail Harder from the Indianapolis Regional.

One no. 1 seed advanced in third-round play: Heartfire from the Kanasas City Regional; the lowest seed to advance to the quarterfinals was again Fail Harder.

The lowest seed to advance to the semifinals was no 4. We Are D3 from the Syracuse Regional.

In the first semifinal game, Best Virginia were eliminated by Eberlein Drive, the no. 2 seed from the Lexington Regional.

In the second semifinal game, We Are D3 were eliminated by AfterShocks, the no. 2 seed from the Wichita Regional.

AfterShocks then defeated Eberlein Drive in the championship game.

=== Louisville Regional – Freedom Hall ===
First Round; July 19
1	The Ville	91
8	Boston vs Cancer	71
4	Sideline Cancer	84
5	Madd Katts	82
6	Team 901	89
3	Florida DRC	83
2	Team Diesel	82
7	LA Ignite	93

Second Round; July 20
1	The Ville	63
4	Sideline Cancer	73
6	Team 901	79
7	LA Ignite	83

Third Round; July 23
4	Sideline Cancer	74
7	LA Ignite	71

=== Lexington Regional – Memorial Coliseum ===
First Round; July 18
1	La Familia	105
8	Stroh's Squad	52
4	War Ready	61
5	X-Rayted	55
3	Dunkin' Dogs	69
6	Tampa Florida Pickup Basketball	70
2	Eberlein Drive	81
7	Richards Elite	63

Second Round; July 20
1	La Familia	80
4	War Ready	76
6	Tampa Florida Pickup Basketball	68
2	Eberlein Drive	86

Third Round; July 22
1	La Familia	70
2	Eberlein Drive	71

=== James Madison Regional – Atlantic Union Bank Center ===
First Round; July 18
1	Happy Valley Hoopers	75
8	Raleigh 919 Legends	79
4	Founding Fathers	64
5	NXT Era Elite	82
3	Red Rose Thunder	70
6	Magic Show	59
2	Shell Shock	75
7	Love Virginia	74

Second Round; July 20
8	Raleigh 919 Legends	44
5	NXT Era Elite	70
3	Red Rose Thunder	78
2	Shell Shock	81

Third Round; July 22
5	NXT Era Elite	62
2	Shell Shock	68

=== West Virginia Regional – Charleston Coliseum ===
First Round; July 18
4	Court Street Kings	74
5	The Nawf	62
3	Best Virginia	72
6	Dubois Dream	69
2	Herd That	84
7	Sikh Warriors	71

Second Round; July 20
1	Elite Nation	88
4	Court Street Kings	85
3	Best Virginia	82
2	Herd That	75

Third Round; July 22
1	Elite Nation	68
3	Best Virginia	79

=== Wichita Regional – Charles Koch Arena ===
First Round; July 18
4	Fire Family	85
5	Run DFW	65
3	Challenge ALS	75
6	Austin's Own	73
2	AfterShocks	74
7	No Excuses	51

Second Round; July 20
1	Forever Coogs	82
4	Fire Family	69
3	Challenge ALS	68
2	AfterShocks	85

Third Round; July 22
1	Forever Coogs	63
2	AfterShocks	66

=== Kansas City Regional – Municipal Arena ===
First Round; July 19
4	Sheffield Sharks	70
5	DaGuys STL	64
3	Purple Reign	85
6	The Shine	84
2	JHX Hoops	91
7	OffDaHook	78

Second Round; July 21
1	Heartfire	89
4	Sheffield Sharks	70
3	Purple Reign	77
2	JHX Hoops	79

Third Round; July 23
1	Heartfire	71
2	JHX Hoops	68

=== Syracuse Regional – SRC Arena ===
First Round; July 19
1	Boeheim's Army	97
8	Herkimer Originals	71
4	We Are D3	75
5	Layne's Hope	71
3	Green Mountain Men	66
6	Rise and Grind	64
2	Stars of Storrs	90
7	Brown Ballers	78

Second Round; July 21
1	Boeheim's Army	78
4	We Are D3	81
3	Green Mountain Men	76
2	Stars of Storrs	78

Third Round; July 23
4	We Are D3	76
2	Stars of Storrs	68

=== Indianapolis Regional – Hinkle Fieldhouse ===
First Round; July 19
1	Carmen's Crew	78
8	Gotime Green Machine	67
4	Locked In Elite	56
5	Fort Wayne Champs	103
3	All Good Dawgs	77
6	Shield 219	69
2	Assembly Ball	76
7	Fail Harder	89

Second Round; July 21
1	Carmen's Crew	73
5	Fort Wayne Champs	69
3	All Good Dawgs	77
7	Fail Harder	80

Third Round; July 22
1	Carmen's Crew	62
7	Fail Harder	68

=== Championship Week ===
All quarterfinal, semifinal and championship games will be played at the venue with the highest ticket sales.

Quarterfinals; July 27–28
LV 4	Sideline Cancer	75
LX 2	Eberlein Drive	88
West Virginia
JM 2	Shell Shock	61
WV 3	Best Virginia	74
WT 2	AfterShocks	74
KC 1	Heartfire	68
Wichita
SC 4	We Are D3	95
IN 7	Fail Harder	93

Semifinals; July 31
LX 2	Eberlein Drive	85
WV 3	Best Virginia	77
WT 2	AfterShocks	66
SC 4	We Are D3	54

Championship; August 3
LX 2	Eberlein Drive	67
WT 2	AfterShocks	82

==== Semifinals ====
FS1

July 31, 2025
6:00 p.m. EDT

Stats

LX 2 Eberlein Drive 85, WV 3 Best Virginia 77
Scoring by quarter: 21–18, 16–22, 27–21, 13–14
Pts: G. York 25; Rebs: T. Taylor, J. Watson 7 Asts: A. Clemmons 8	Pts: J. Reese V 15; Rebs: J. Weatherspoon, J. West 4 Asts: J. West 8

Charleston Coliseum
Charleston, West Virginia
Attendance: 3,451
Referees: Clarence Armstrong, Bill Covington, Earl Walton

FS1

July 31, 2025
8:00 p.m. EDT

Stats

SC 4 We Are D3 54, WT 2 AfterShocks 66
Scoring by quarter: 12–14, 5–21, 21–12, 11–11
Pts: T. Nichols 14; Rebs: D. Underwood 8 Asts: T. Nichols 7	Pts: J. Woodard 12; Rebs: M. Santos-Silva 6 Asts: C. Frankamp, J. Woodard 3

Charles Koch Arena
Wichita, Kansas

==== Championship ====
FOX

August 3, 2025
4:00 p.m. EDT

Stats

LX 2 Eberlein Drive 67, WT 2 AfterShocks 82
Scoring by quarter: 20–21, 17–25, 21–21, 6–7
Pts: J. Watson 14; Rebs: T. Taylor 7 Asts: A. Clemmons 2	Pts: M. Keene 22; Rebs: N. Sibande 6 Asts: M. Santos-Silva, C. Frankamp 4

Charles Koch Arena
Wichita, Kansas
Attendance: 9,029
Referees: Clarence Armstrong, Earl Walton, Wes Moore

== Awards ==
All Tournament Team
Pos	Player	Team
PG	Nike Sibande	AfterShocks
PG	Darius Adams	Fail Harder
SG	James Reese V	Best Virginia
SG	Gabe York	Eberlein Drive
PG	Marcus Keene	AfterShocks
Coach	Michael Rejniak	We Are D3
GM	Matt Mitchell / Jacob Hirschman	Eberlein Drive
