= 2009 NBA draft =

Basketball player selection

General information
- Sport: Basketball
- Date: June 25, 2009
- Location: The Theater at Madison Square Garden (New York City)
- Network: ESPN

Overview
- 60 total selections in 2 rounds
- League: NBA
- First selection: Blake Griffin (Los Angeles Clippers)

The 2009 NBA draft was held on June 25, 2009, at The Theater at Madison Square Garden at Madison Square Garden in New York City. In this draft, the National Basketball Association (NBA) teams took turns selecting amateur U.S. college basketball players and other eligible players, including international players.

The Los Angeles Clippers, who won the draft lottery on May 19, 2009, used their first overall draft pick to draft Blake Griffin from the University of Oklahoma. However, he missed the entire 2009–10 season due to surgery on his broken left kneecap, which he injured during the pre-season. Tanzanian-born Hasheem Thabeet from University of Connecticut was drafted second by the Memphis Grizzlies. Thabeet became the first player born in Tanzania to be drafted by an NBA team. James Harden was drafted 3rd by the Oklahoma City Thunder. This made him the first player to be drafted by the franchise as the Oklahoma City Thunder; the franchise moved from Seattle to OKC in 2008. The Sacramento Kings drafted Tyreke Evans 4th; he was named 2009–10 NBA Rookie of the Year, after he became the fourth NBA player in history to average at least 20 points, 5 rebounds and 5 assists in his rookie season, joining the elite club of Oscar Robertson (1960), Michael Jordan (1984) and LeBron James (2003). Spanish teenager Ricky Rubio was drafted 5th by the Minnesota Timberwolves. Rubio became the fifth-highest-drafted international player who never played U.S. college basketball to be drafted in the NBA, tied with Nikoloz Tskitishvili (5th in 2002), and behind Yao Ming (1st in 2002), Andrea Bargnani (1st in 2006), Darko Miličić (2nd in 2003) and Pau Gasol (3rd in 2001). Twenty-third pick Omri Casspi became the first Israeli player to be drafted in the first round, and later he became the first Israeli to play in the NBA.

The 2009 draft marked the first time three sons of former NBA players were selected in the top 15 picks of the draft. Stephen Curry, son of Dell Curry, was drafted 7th by the Golden State Warriors. Gerald Henderson Jr., son of Gerald Henderson, was drafted 12th by the Charlotte Bobcats. Austin Daye, son of Darren Daye, was drafted 15th by the Detroit Pistons. The draft also marked the first time a former high school player who skipped college to play professional basketball in Europe was selected in an NBA draft. Brandon Jennings, who skipped college to play professional basketball with Italian team Lottomatica Roma, was drafted 10th overall by the Milwaukee Bucks in the draft.

Of the 60 players drafted, four were freshmen, nine were sophomores, 12 were juniors, 22 were seniors, and 13 were international players without U.S. college basketball experience. The University of North Carolina's Tar Heels had the most players selected in the draft; three players were selected in the first round and one was selected in the second round. This marked the second time ever that four Tar Heels players were selected in the first two rounds of an NBA draft. The Minnesota Timberwolves had the league-high four first-round draft picks and the first time in team history that the team held two top-10 draft picks. The Timberwolves also had two second-round draft picks and became the team with the most draft picks in the 2009 draft with a total of six. The Houston Rockets and the Orlando Magic were the only NBA teams who did not have a draft pick this year, although Houston acquired three drafted players' rights after the draft.

From the players in this draft, there have been six players selected as All-Stars; out of these six, Curry and Harden have both won the NBA's regular season MVP award. Nine players chosen in the 2009 draft have been on teams that have won an NBA championship: Danny Green, Roddy Beaubois, Stephen Curry, Austin Daye, Jrue Holiday, Jodie Meeks, Patty Mills, Jeff Ayres and Jeff Teague; of those, three have won multiple championships, Green, three times, Curry, four times, and Holiday, two times. Curry was named MVP of the 2022 NBA Finals.

As of 2026, there are still four active NBA players from this draft: James Harden, Stephen Curry, DeMar DeRozan, and Jrue Holiday.

== Draft selections ==
PG	Point guard	SG	Shooting guard	SF	Small forward	PF	Power forward	C	Center

*	Denotes player who has been selected for at least one All-Star Game and All-NBA Team
^{+}	Denotes player who has been selected for at least one All-Star Game
^{#}	Denotes player who has never appeared in an NBA regular-season or playoff game
^{~}	Denotes player who has been selected as Rookie of the Year

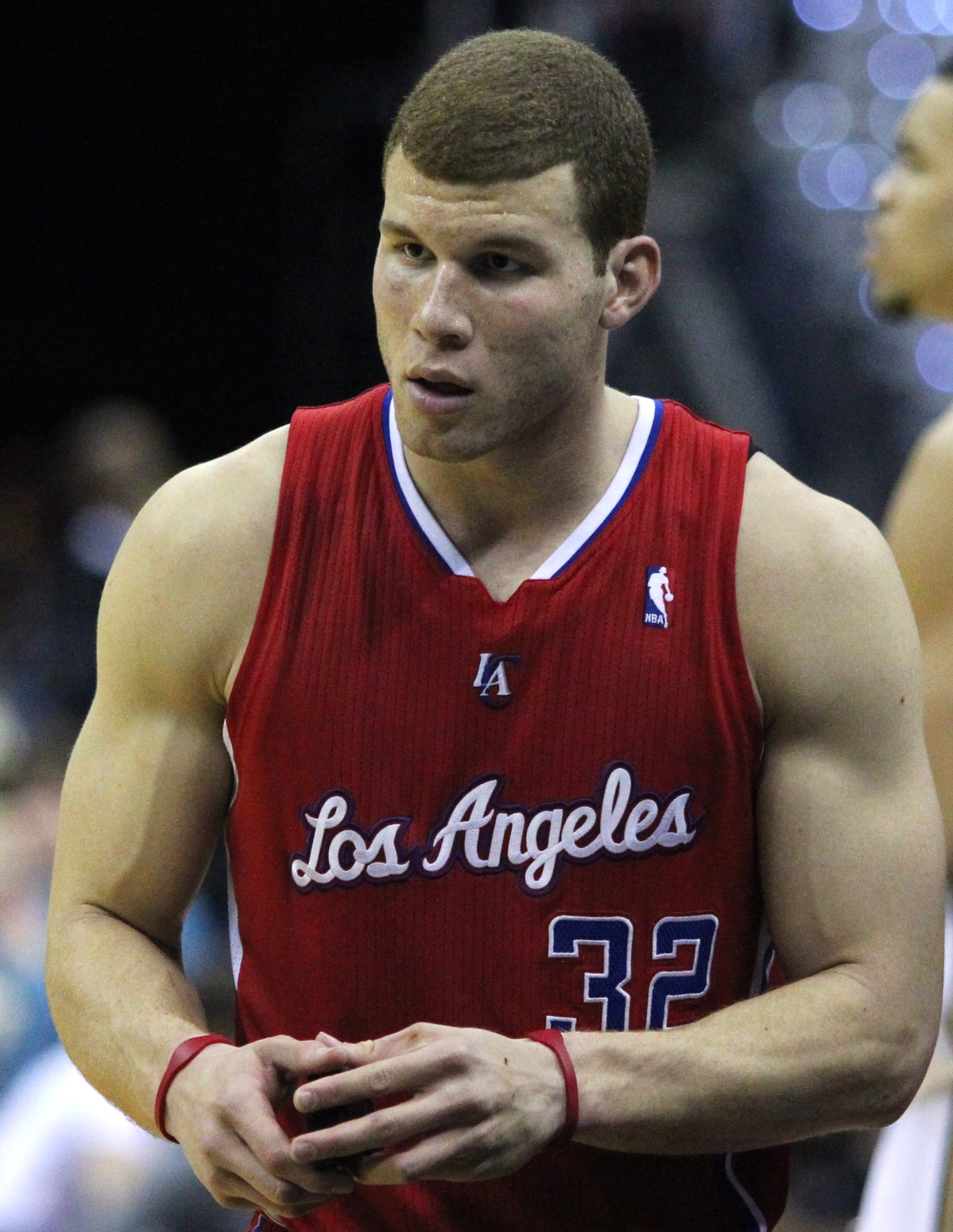
Blake Griffin was selected first by the Los Angeles Clippers. He is a six-time All-Star and five-time All-NBA team selection.

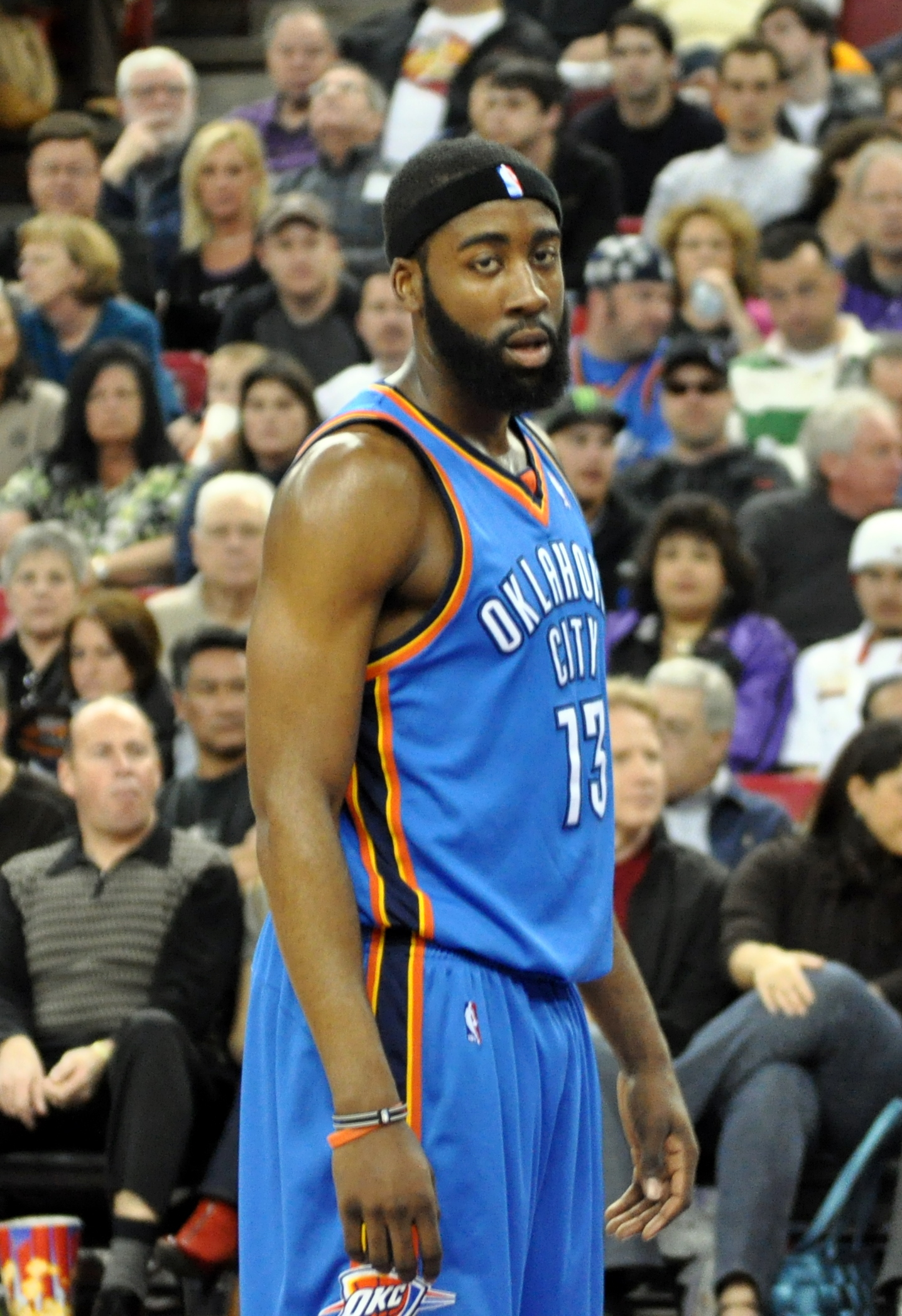
James Harden was selected third by the Oklahoma City Thunder. He won the MVP award in 2018 and led the league in scoring three years in a row.

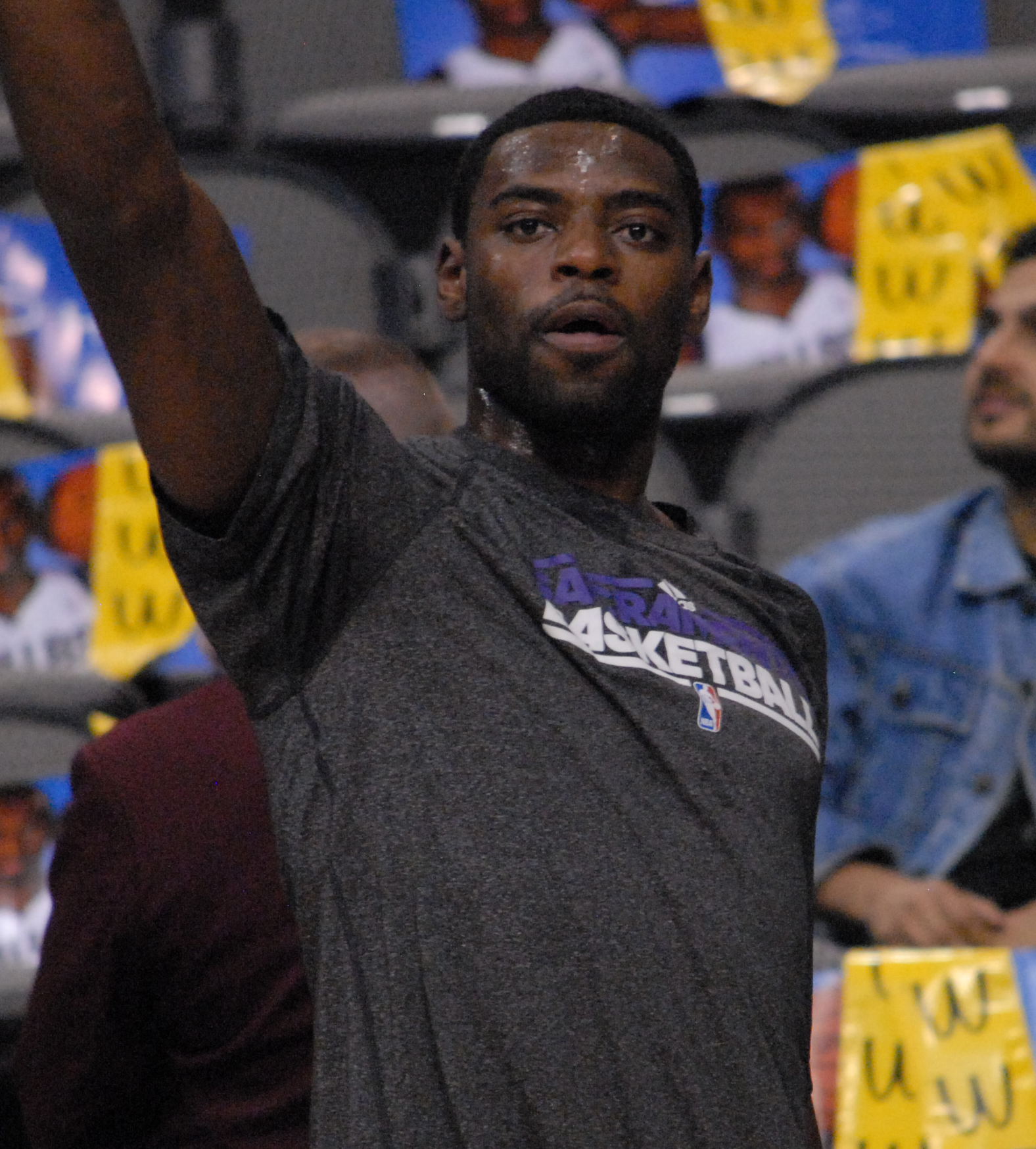
Tyreke Evans was selected fourth by the Sacramento Kings. He won Rookie of the Year in 2010.

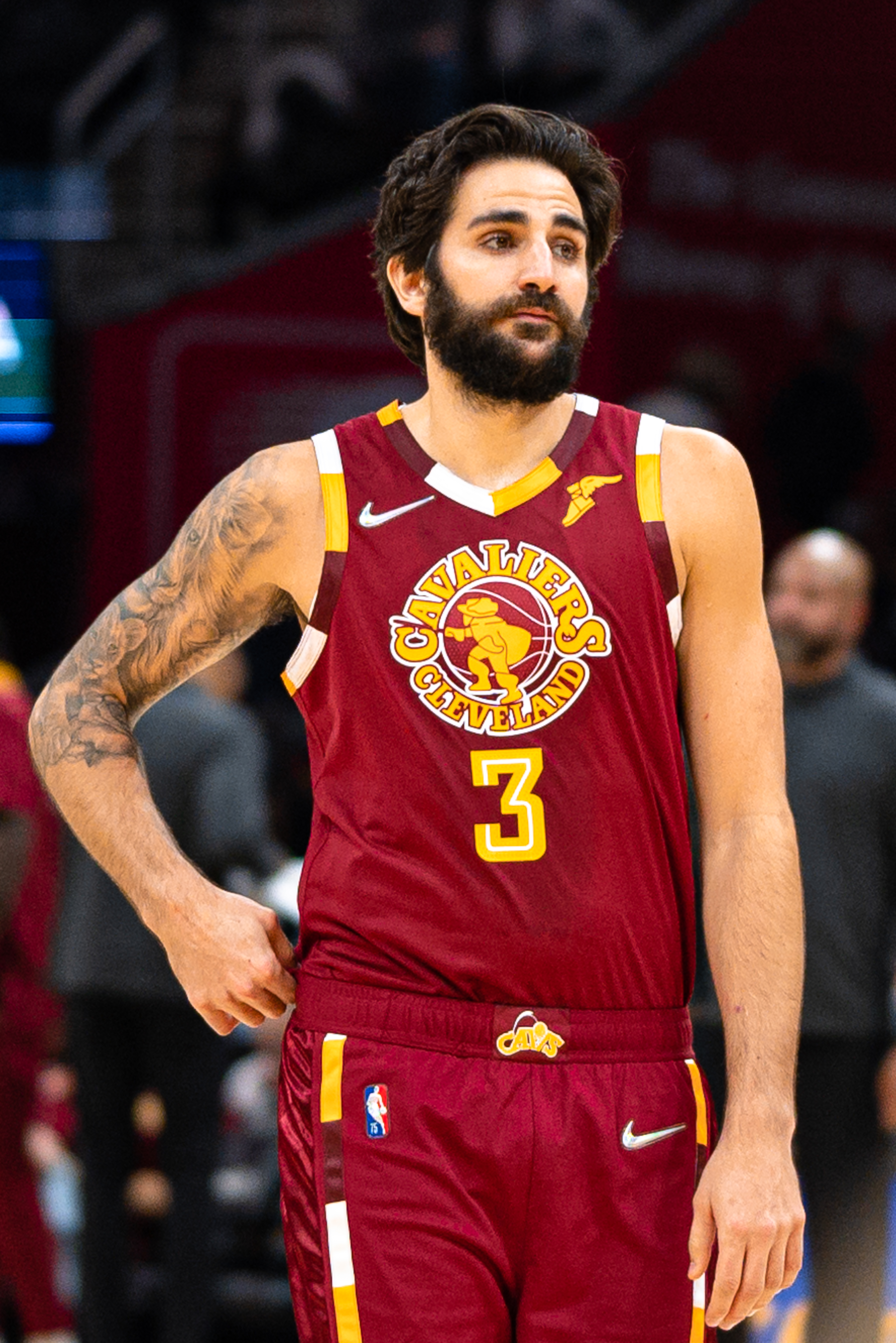
Ricky Rubio was selected fifth by the Minnesota Timberwolves.

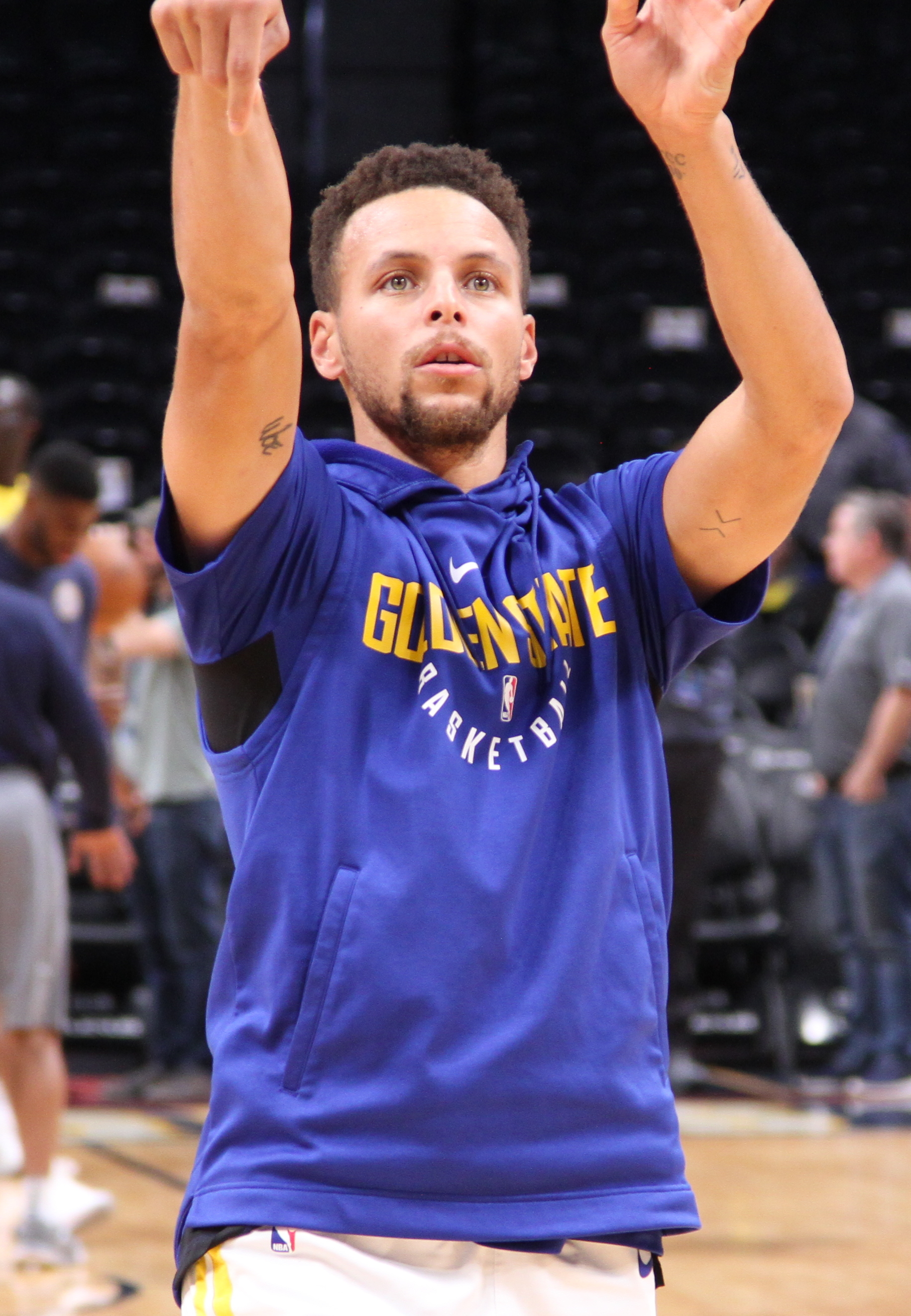
Stephen Curry was selected seventh by the Golden State Warriors. He has firmly established himself as the NBA's all-time greatest shooter, guiding the Warriors to four championships and winning back-to-back MVPs. He was the only unanimous MVP in league history, in 2016.

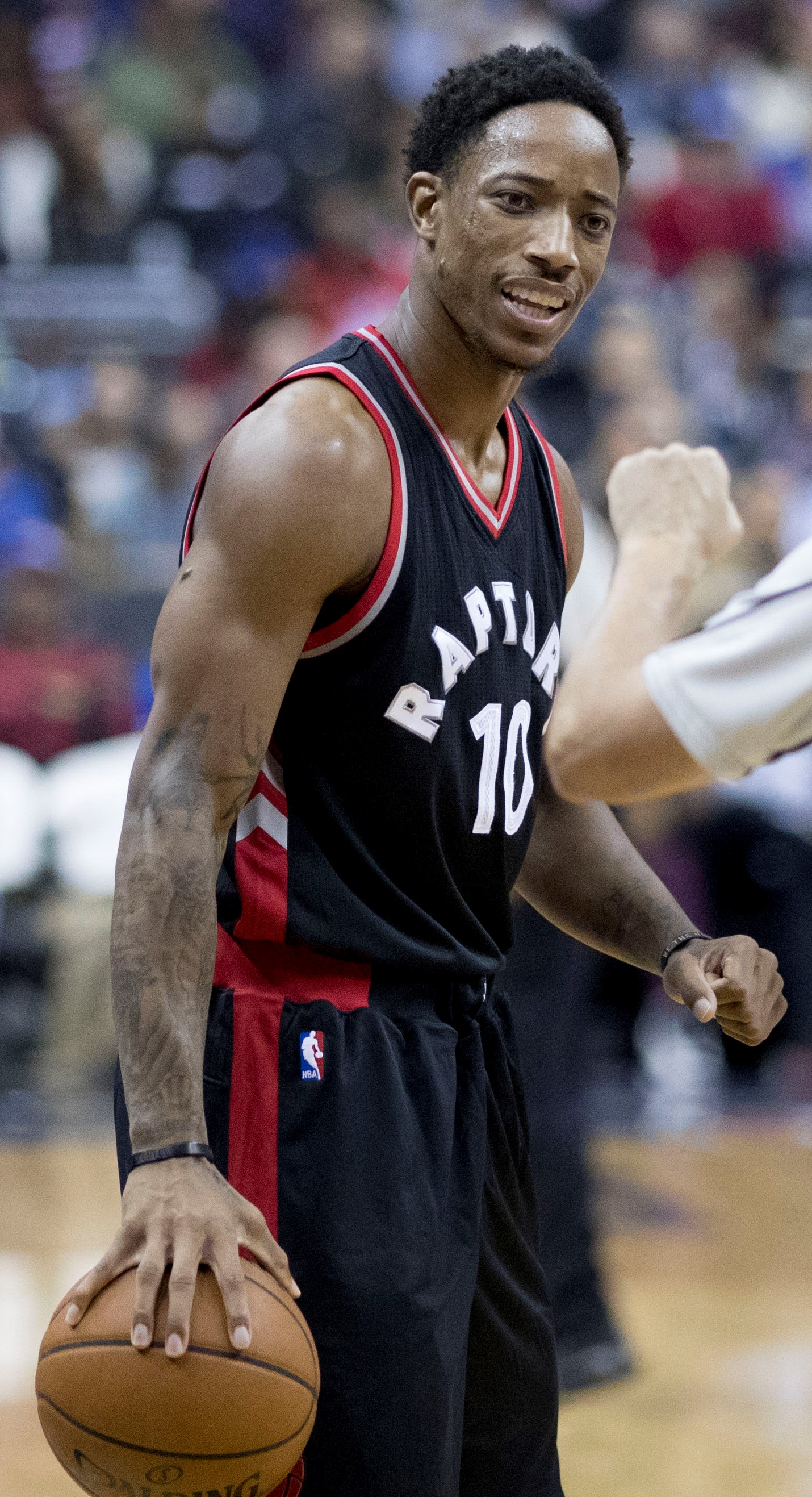
DeMar DeRozan was selected ninth by the Toronto Raptors and is a six-time All-Star and three-time All-NBA team selection.

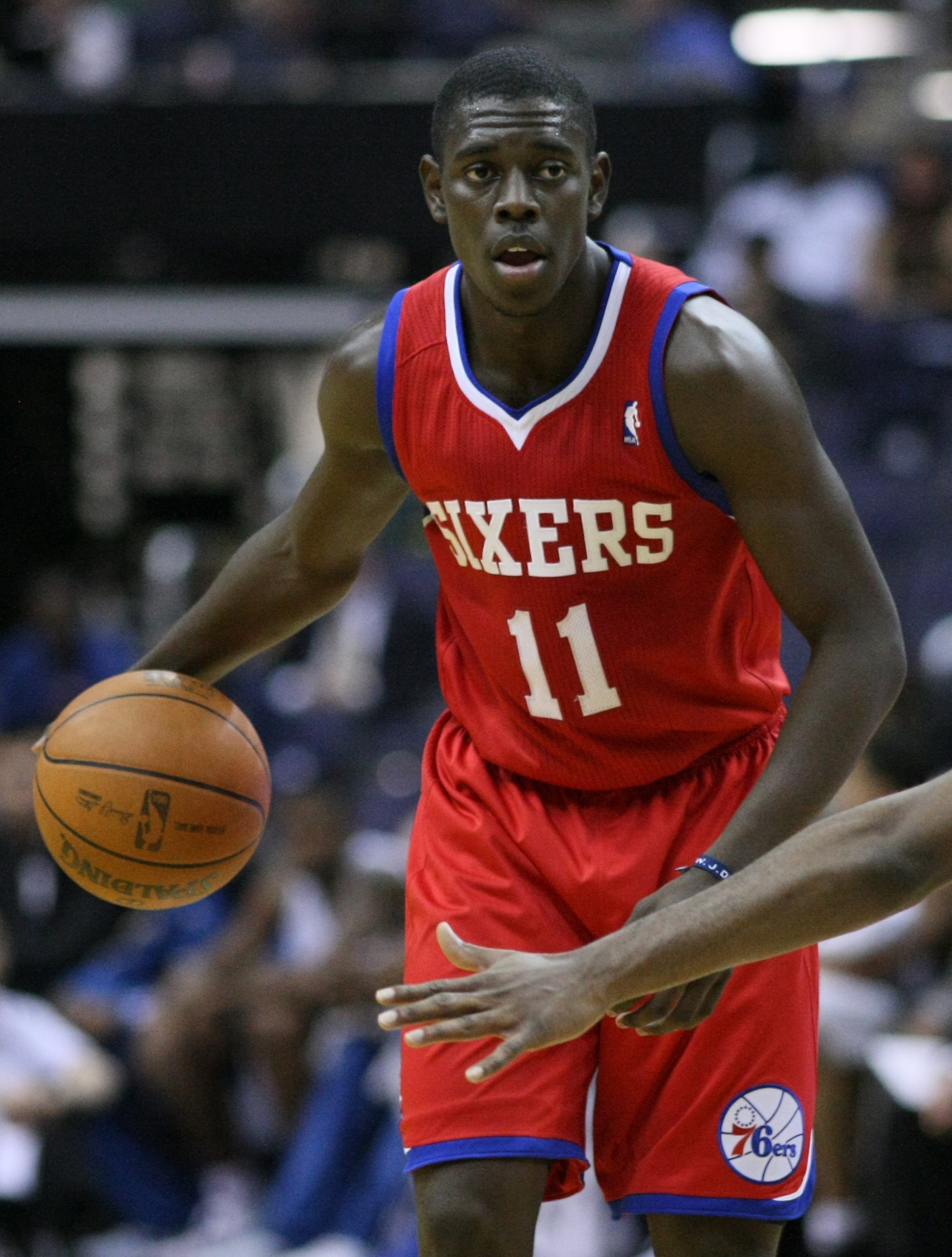
Jrue Holiday was selected 17th by the Philadelphia 76ers. He is a two-time All-Star, a six-time NBA All-Defensive Team selection and won a championship in 2021 with the Milwaukee Bucks, then a second championship in 2024 with the Boston Celtics.

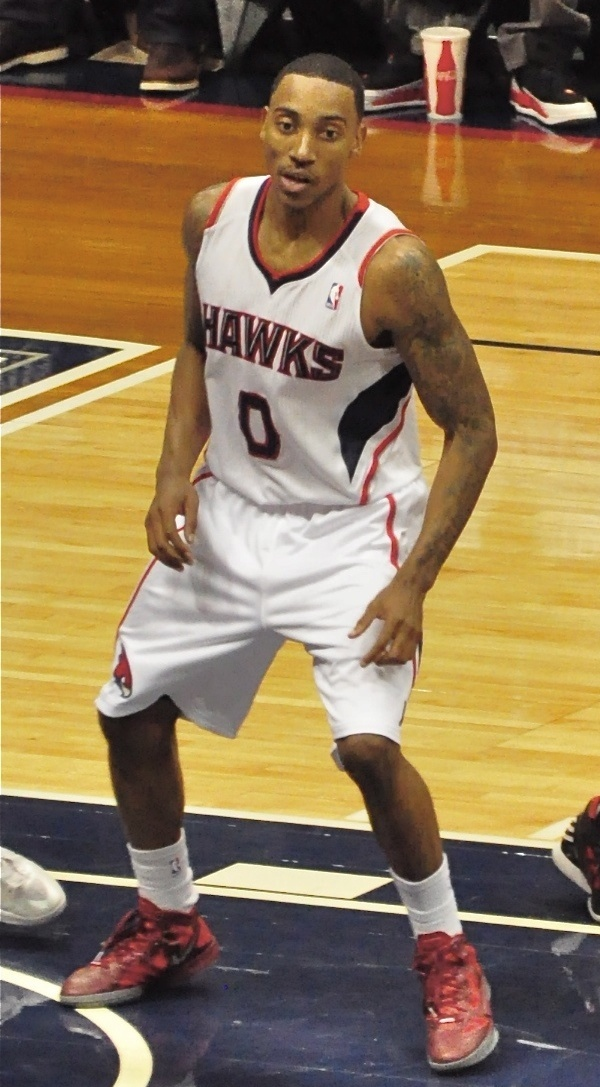
Jeff Teague was selected 19th by the Atlanta Hawks. He was an All-Star in 2015 and won a championship in 2021.

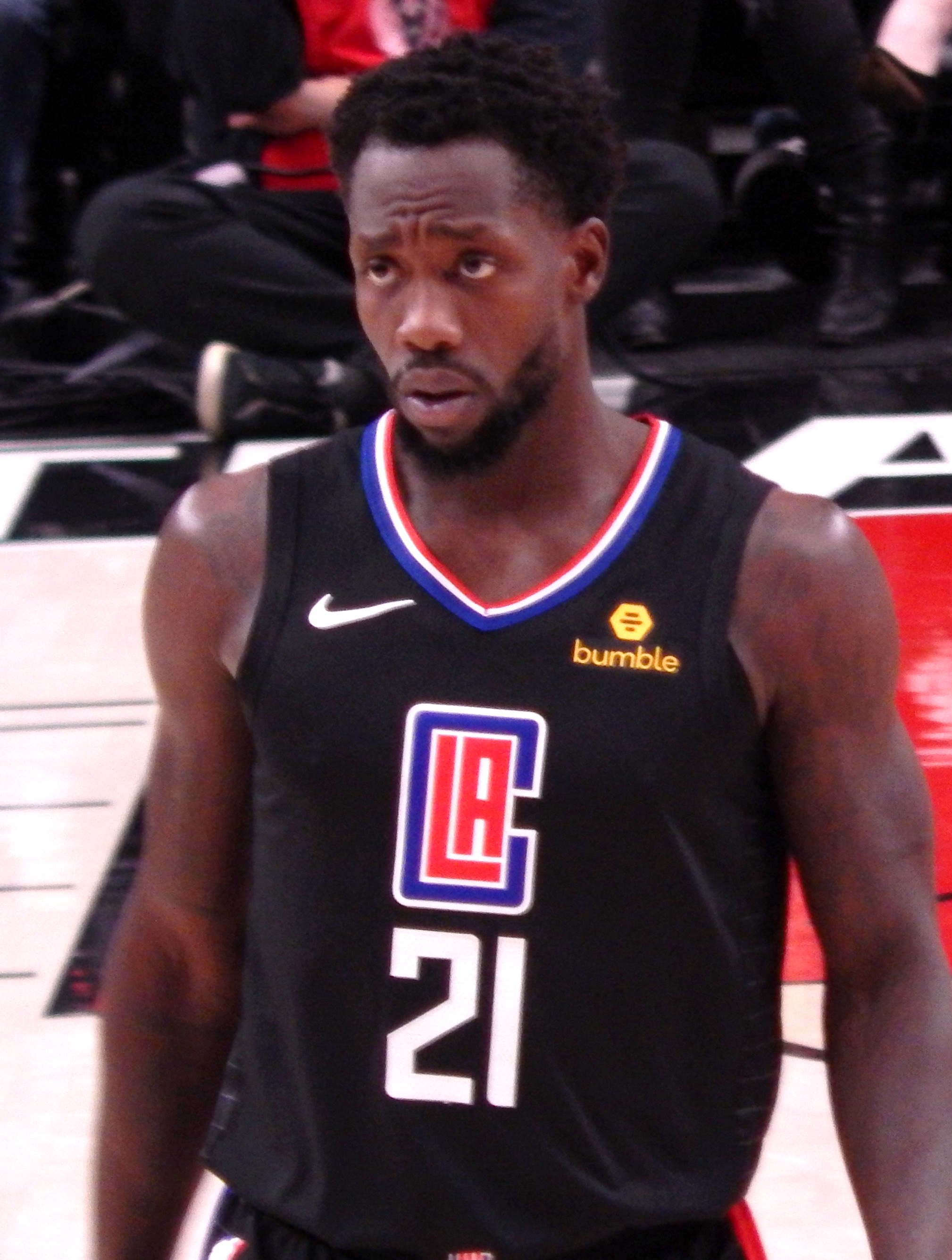
Patrick Beverley was selected 42nd by the Los Angeles Lakers. He is a three-time NBA All-Defensive Team selection.

Round	Pick	Player	Position	Nationality (Note: Nationality indicates the player's national team or representative nationality. If a player has not competed at the international level, then the nationality indicates the national team which the player is eligible to represent according to FIBA rules.)	Team	School/club team
1	1	Blake Griffin^{*~}	PF	United States	Los Angeles Clippers	Oklahoma (So.)
1	2	Hasheem Thabeet	C	Tanzania	Memphis Grizzlies	Connecticut (Jr.)
1	3	James Harden^{*}	SG	United States	Oklahoma City Thunder	Arizona State (So.)
1	4	Tyreke Evans^{~}	SG	United States	Sacramento Kings	Memphis (Fr.)
1	5	Ricky Rubio	PG	Spain	Minnesota Timberwolves (from Washington)^{[a]}	DKV Joventut (Spain)
1	6	Jonny Flynn	PG	United States	Minnesota Timberwolves^{[b]}	Syracuse (So.)
1	7	Stephen Curry^{*}	PG	United States	Golden State Warriors	Davidson (Jr.)
1	8	Jordan Hill	PF	United States	New York Knicks	Arizona (Jr.)
1	9	DeMar DeRozan^{*}	SG	United States	Toronto Raptors	USC (Fr.)
1	10	Brandon Jennings	PG	United States	Milwaukee Bucks	Lottomatica Roma (Italy)
1	11	Terrence Williams	SG	United States	New Jersey Nets	Louisville (Sr.)
1	12	Gerald Henderson	SG	United States	Charlotte Bobcats	Duke (Jr.)
1	13	Tyler Hansbrough	PF	United States	Indiana Pacers	North Carolina (Sr.)
1	14	Earl Clark	SF	United States	Phoenix Suns	Louisville (Jr.)
1	15	Austin Daye	SF	United States	Detroit Pistons	Gonzaga (So.)
1	16	James Johnson	SF	United States	Chicago Bulls	Wake Forest (So.)
1	17	Jrue Holiday^{+}	PG	United States	Philadelphia 76ers	UCLA (Fr.)
1	18	Ty Lawson	PG	United States	Minnesota Timberwolves (from Miami,^{[c]} traded to Denver)^{[A]}	North Carolina (Jr.)
1	19	Jeff Teague^{+}	PG	United States	Atlanta Hawks	Wake Forest (So.)
1	20	Eric Maynor	PG	United States	Utah Jazz	VCU (Sr.)
1	21	Darren Collison	PG	United States	New Orleans Hornets	UCLA (Sr.)
1	22	Víctor Claver	SF	Spain	Portland Trail Blazers (from Dallas)^{[d]}	Pamesa Valencia (Spain)
1	23	Omri Casspi	SF	Israel	Sacramento Kings (from Houston)^{[e]}	Maccabi Tel Aviv (Israel)
1	24	Byron Mullens	C	United States; United Kingdom	Dallas Mavericks (from Portland,^{[d]} traded to Oklahoma City)^{[B]}	Ohio State (Fr.)
1	25	Rodrigue Beaubois	PG	France	Oklahoma City Thunder (from San Antonio,^{[f]} traded to Dallas)^{[B]}	Cholet (France)
1	26	Taj Gibson	PF	United States	Chicago Bulls (from Denver via Oklahoma City)^{[g]}	USC (Jr.)
1	27	DeMarre Carroll	SF	United States	Memphis Grizzlies (from Orlando)^{[h]}	Missouri (Sr.)
1	28	Wayne Ellington	SG	United States	Minnesota Timberwolves (from Boston)^{[b]}	North Carolina (Jr.)
1	29	Toney Douglas	PG	United States	Los Angeles Lakers (traded to New York)^{[C]}	Florida State (Sr.)
1	30	Christian Eyenga	SF	DR Congo	Cleveland Cavaliers	CB Prat (Spain)
2	31	Jeff Pendergraph	PF	United States	Sacramento Kings (traded to Portland)^{[D]}	Arizona State (Sr.)
2	32	Jermaine Taylor	SG	United States	Washington Wizards (traded to Houston)^{[E]}	Central Florida (Sr.)
2	33	Dante Cunningham	PF	United States	Portland Trail Blazers (from L.A. Clippers)^{[j]}	Villanova (Sr.)
2	34	Sergio Llull^{#}	PG	Spain	Denver Nuggets (from Oklahoma City,^{[k]} traded to Houston)^{[F]}	Real Madrid (Spain)
2	35	DaJuan Summers	PF	United States	Detroit Pistons (from Minnesota)^{[l]}	Georgetown (Jr.)
2	36	Sam Young	SF	United States	Memphis Grizzlies^{[m]}	Pittsburgh (Sr.)
2	37	DeJuan Blair	PF	United States	San Antonio Spurs (from Golden State via Phoenix)^{[n]}	Pittsburgh (So.)
2	38	Jon Brockman	PF	United States	Portland Trail Blazers (from New York via Chicago,^{[o]} traded to Sacramento)^{[D]}	Washington (Sr.)
2	39	Jonas Jerebko	PF	Sweden	Detroit Pistons (from Toronto)^{[p]}	Angelico Biella (Italy)
2	40	Derrick Brown	SF	United States	Charlotte Bobcats (from New Jersey via Oklahoma City)^{[q]}	Xavier (Jr.)
2	41	Jodie Meeks	SG	United States	Milwaukee Bucks	Kentucky (Jr.)
2	42	Patrick Beverley	PG	United States	Los Angeles Lakers (from Charlotte,^{[r]} traded to Miami)^{[G]}	Dnipro (Ukraine)
2	43	Marcus Thornton	SG	United States	Miami Heat (from Indiana,^{[s]} traded to New Orleans)^{[H]}	LSU (Sr.)
2	44	Chase Budinger	SF	United States	Detroit Pistons (traded to Houston)^{[I]}	Arizona (Jr.)
2	45	Nick Calathes	PG	Greece; United States	Minnesota Timberwolves (from Philadelphia via Miami,^{[t]} traded to Dallas)^{[J]}	Florida (So.)
2	46	Danny Green	SF	United States	Cleveland Cavaliers (from Chicago)^{[u]}	North Carolina (Sr.)
2	47	Henk Norel^{#}	PF	Netherlands	Minnesota Timberwolves (from Miami)^{[t]}	DKV Joventut (Spain)
2	48	Taylor Griffin	SF	United States	Phoenix Suns	Oklahoma (Sr.)
2	49	Sergiy Gladyr^{#}	SG	Ukraine	Atlanta Hawks	MBC Mykolaiv (Ukraine)
2	50	Goran Suton^{#}	C	Bosnia and Herzegovina; United States	Utah Jazz	Michigan State (Sr.)
2	51	Jack McClinton^{#}	SG	United States	San Antonio Spurs (from New Orleans via Toronto)^{[v]}	Miami (FL) (Sr.)
2	52	A. J. Price	PG	United States	Indiana Pacers (from Dallas)^{[w]}	Connecticut (Sr.)
2	53	Nando de Colo	PG	France	San Antonio Spurs (from Houston)^{[x]}	Cholet (France)
2	54	Robert Vaden^{#}	SG	United States	Charlotte Bobcats (from San Antonio,^{[y]} traded to Oklahoma City)^{[K]}	UAB (Sr.)
2	55	Patty Mills	PG	Australia	Portland Trail Blazers (from Denver)^{[o]}	Saint Mary's (So.)
2	56	Ahmad Nivins^{#}	PF	United States	Dallas Mavericks (from Portland)^{[d]}	Saint Joseph's (Sr.)
2	57	Emir Preldžić^{#}	PF	Slovenia; Turkey	Phoenix Suns (from Orlando via Oklahoma City,^{[z]} traded to Cleveland)^{[L]}	Fenerbahçe Ülker (Turkey)
2	58	Lester Hudson	PG	United States	Boston Celtics	Tennessee-Martin (Sr.)
2	59	Chinemelu Elonu^{#}	PF	Nigeria; United States	Los Angeles Lakers	Texas A&M (Jr.)
2	60	Robert Dozier^{#}	SF	United States	Miami Heat (from Cleveland)^{[aa]}	Memphis (Sr.)

a: Nick Calathes was born in the United States, and has dual U.S. and Greek citizenship by birth. He has represented Greece internationally.
b: Goran Suton, who was born in Bosnia and Herzegovina, is also a naturalized citizen of the United States since 2006.
c: Emir Preldžić, who was born in Bosnia and Herzegovina, also has Slovenian and Turkish citizenship. He had represented Slovenia internationally in 2008, before switching to Turkey.
d: Chinemelu Elonu, born in Nigeria, is a naturalized citizen of the United States.

== Notable undrafted players ==
These players were not selected in the 2009 NBA draft but have played at least one game in the NBA.

Player	Position	Nationality	School/club team
Jeff Adrien	PF	United States	Connecticut (Sr.)
Josh Akognon	PG	United States; Nigeria	Cal State Fullerton (Sr.)
Antonio Anderson	SG	United States	Memphis (Sr.)
Aron Baynes	C/PF	Australia	Washington State (Sr.)
Dionte Christmas	SG	United States	Temple (Sr.)
Marcus Cousin	C	United States	Houston (Sr.)
Luigi Datome	SF	Italy	Virtus Roma (Italy)
Justin Dentmon	PG	United States	Washington (Sr.)
Shane Edwards	F	United States	Arkansas–Little Rock (Sr.)
Vítor Faverani	PF/C	Brazil	CB Axarquía (Spain)
Alonzo Gee	SF/SG	United States	Alabama (Sr.)
Terrel Harris	G	United States	Oklahoma State (Sr.)
Joe Ingles	SG/SF	Australia	South Dragons (Australia)
Aaron Jackson	PG/SG	United States	Duquesne (Sr.)
Cedric Jackson	PG	United States	Cleveland State (Sr.)
Chris Johnson	C/PF	United States	LSU (Sr.)
Viacheslav Kravtsov	C	Ukraine	Kyiv (Ukraine)
Marcus Landry	PF	United States	Wisconsin (Sr.)
Wesley Matthews	SG/SF	United States	Marquette (Sr.)
Jerel McNeal	PG/SG	United States	Marquette (Sr.)
Jeremy Pargo	PG	United States	Gonzaga (Sr.)
Garret Siler	C	United States	Augusta State (Sr.)
Garrett Temple	SG	United States	LSU (Sr.)
Miloš Teodosić	G	Serbia	Olympiacos Piraeus (Greece)
Luke Zeller	F/C	United States	Notre Dame (Sr.)

== Trades involving draft picks ==
=== Pre-draft trades ===
Prior to the day of the draft, the following trades were made and resulted in exchanges of draft picks between the teams.

- ^{a 1} ^{2} On June 24, 2009, Minnesota acquired the 5th pick, Etan Thomas, Darius Songaila and Oleksiy Pecherov from Washington in exchange for Randy Foye and Mike Miller. Minnesota used the 5th pick to draft Ricky Rubio.
- ^{b} On July 31, 2007, Minnesota re-acquired their 2009 first-round draft pick along with Al Jefferson, Gerald Green, Ryan Gomes, Sebastian Telfair, Theo Ratliff, a 2009 first-round draft pick and cash considerations from Boston in exchange for Kevin Garnett. Previously, Boston acquired a 2009 first-round draft pick, Wally Szczerbiak, Michael Olowokandi and Dwayne Jones on January 26, 2006, from Minnesota in exchange for Ricky Davis, Marcus Banks, Mark Blount, Justin Reed and two second-round draft picks. Minnesota used the 28th pick to draft Wayne Ellington.
- ^{c} On October 24, 2007, Minnesota acquired a 2009 first-round draft pick, Antoine Walker, Wayne Simien, Michael Doleac and cash considerations from Miami in exchange for Ricky Davis and Mark Blount. Minnesota used the 18th pick to draft Ty Lawson.
- ^{d 1} ^{2} ^{3} On June 24, 2009, Portland acquired the 22nd pick from Dallas in exchange for the 24th pick, 56th pick and a 2010 second-round draft pick. Portland used the 22nd pick to draft Víctor Claver and Dallas used the 24th and 56th pick to draft Byron Mullens and Ahmad Nivins, respectively.
- ^{e} On August 14, 2008, Sacramento acquired a 2009 first-round draft pick, Bobby Jackson, Donté Greene and cash considerations from Houston in exchange for Ron Artest, Sean Singletary and Patrick Ewing Jr. Sacramento used the 23rd pick to draft Omri Casspi.
- ^{f} On February 20, 2008, Oklahoma City (as Seattle) acquired a 2009 first-round draft pick, Francisco Elson and Brent Barry from San Antonio in exchange for Kurt Thomas. Oklahoma City used the 25th pick to draft Rodrigue Beaubois.
- ^{g} On February 19, 2009, Chicago acquired Denver's 2009 first-round draft pick from Oklahoma City in exchange for Thabo Sefolosha. Previously, Oklahoma City acquired a 2009 first-round draft pick, Chucky Atkins and cash considerations on January 7, 2009, from Denver in exchange for a 2009 second-round draft pick and Johan Petro. Chicago used the 26th pick to draft Taj Gibson.
- ^{h} On February 19, 2009, Memphis acquired a 2009 first-round draft pick, Mike Wilks, Adonal Foyle and cash considerations from Orlando in a three-team trade with Orlando and Houston. Memphis used the 27th pick to draft DeMarre Carroll.
- ^{j} On June 26, 2008, Portland acquired a 2009 second-round draft pick from the L.A. Clippers in exchange for the draft rights to Mike Taylor. Portland used the 33rd pick to draft Dante Cunningham.
- ^{k} On January 7, 2009, Denver acquired a 2009 second-round draft pick and Johan Petro from Oklahoma City in exchange for a 2009 first-round draft pick, Chucky Atkins and cash considerations. Denver used the 34th pick to draft Sergio Llull.
- ^{l} On October 31, 2005, Detroit acquired a 2009 second-round draft pick from Minnesota in exchange for Ronald Dupree. Detroit used the 35th pick to draft DaJuan Summers.
- ^{m} On December 24, 2008, Memphis re-acquired their 2009 second-round draft pick along with Steve Francis and cash considerations from Houston in exchange for a 2011 second-round draft pick. Previously, Houston acquired a 2009 second-round draft pick and the draft rights to Donté Greene from Memphis in a three-team trade with Memphis and Portland on June 26, 2008.
- ^{n} On June 26, 2008, San Antonio acquired Golden State's 2009 second-round draft pick, the draft rights to Malik Hairston and cash considerations from Phoenix in exchange for the draft rights to Goran Dragić. Previously, Phoenix acquired 2007 and 2009 second-round draft picks on January 3, 2005, from Golden State in exchange for Žarko Čabarkapa. San Antonio used the 37th pick to draft DeJuan Blair.
- ^{o 1} ^{2} On June 26, 2008, Portland acquired a 2009 second-round draft pick from Denver in a three-team trade with Denver and Chicago. Portland also acquired New York's 2009 second-round draft pick and Chicago's 2010 second-round draft pick from Chicago. Previously, Chicago acquired a 2006 first-round draft pick, 2007 and 2009 second-round draft picks, an option to exchange 2007 first-round draft picks, Tim Thomas, Michael Sweetney and Jermaine Jackson on October 4, 2005, from New York in exchange for Eddy Curry and Antonio Davis. Portland used the 38th and 55th pick to draft Jon Brockman and Patrick Mills, respectively.
- ^{p} On June 15, 2007, Detroit acquired 2009 and 2011 second-round draft picks from Toronto in exchange for Carlos Delfino. Detroit used the 39th pick to draft Jonas Jerebko.
- ^{q} On August 11, 2008, Charlotte acquired New Jersey's 2009 second-round draft pick from Oklahoma City in exchange for the draft rights to Kyle Weaver. Previously, Oklahoma City (as Seattle) acquired a 2009 second-round draft pick on July 7, 2006, from New Jersey in exchange for Mikki Moore. Charlotte used the 40th pick to draft Derrick Brown.
- ^{r} On December 6, 2004, the L.A. Lakers acquired 2005 and 2009 second-round draft picks from Charlotte in exchange for Kareem Rush. The L.A. Lakers used the 42nd pick to draft Patrick Beverley.
- ^{s} On June 28, 2007, Miami acquired a 2009 second-round draft pick from Indiana in exchange for the draft rights to Stanko Barać. Miami used the 43rd pick to draft Marcus Thornton.
- ^{t 1} ^{2} On June 26, 2008, Minnesota acquired Philadelphia's and Miami's 2009 second-round draft picks and cash considerations from Miami in exchange for the draft rights to Mario Chalmers. Previously, Miami acquired a 2009 second-round draft pick, the draft rights to Daequan Cook and cash considerations on June 28, 2007, from Philadelphia in exchange for the draft rights to Jason Smith. Minnesota used the 45th and 47th pick to draft Nick Calathes and Henk Norel, respectively.
- ^{u} On February 21, 2008, Cleveland acquired Ben Wallace, Joe Smith and a 2009 second-round draft pick from Chicago in a three-team trade with Chicago and Oklahoma City (as Seattle). Cleveland used the 46th pick to draft Danny Green.
- ^{v} On June 21, 2006, San Antonio acquired New Orleans's 2009 second-round draft pick, Matt Bonner and Eric Williams from Toronto in exchange for Rasho Nesterović. Previously, Toronto acquired Miami's 2006 second-round draft pick and New Orleans's 2009 second-round draft pick on January 31, 2006, from New Orleans in exchange for Aaron Williams. San Antonio used the 51st pick to draft Jack McClinton.
- ^{w} On October 10, 2008, Indiana acquired 2009 and 2010 second-round draft picks, Eddie Jones and cash considerations from Dallas in exchange for Shawne Williams. Indiana used the 52nd pick to draft A. J. Price.
- ^{x} On July 12, 2007, San Antonio acquired a 2009 second-round draft pick, Vassilis Spanoulis and cash considerations from Houston in exchange for Jackie Butler and the draft rights to Luis Scola. San Antonio used the 53rd pick to draft Nando de Colo.
- ^{y} On February 13, 2007, Charlotte acquired a 2009 second-round draft pick, Eric Williams and cash considerations from San Antonio in exchange for Melvin Ely. Charlotte used the 54th pick to draft Robert Vaden.
- ^{z} On July 20, 2007, Phoenix acquired Orlando's 2009 second-round draft pick from Oklahoma City (as Seattle) in exchange for 2008 and 2010 first-round draft picks and Kurt Thomas. Previously, Oklahoma City (as Seattle) acquired a 2009 second-round draft pick on July 11, 2007, from Orlando in exchange for Rashard Lewis. Phoenix used the 57th pick to draft Emir Preldžič.
- ^{aa} On June 26, 2008, Miami acquired a 2009 second-round draft pick from Cleveland in exchange for the draft rights to Darnell Jackson. Miami used the 60th pick to draft Robert Dozier.

=== Draft-day trades ===
The following trades involving drafted players were made on the day of the draft.

- ^{A} Denver acquired the draft rights to 18th pick Ty Lawson from Minnesota in exchange for a future conditional first-round draft pick.
- ^{B 1} ^{2} Oklahoma City acquired the draft rights to 24th pick Byron Mullens from Dallas in exchange for the draft rights to 25th pick Rodrigue Beaubois and a 2010 second-round draft pick.
- ^{C} New York acquired the draft rights to 29th pick Toney Douglas from the L.A. Lakers in exchange for a 2011 second-round draft pick and cash considerations.
- ^{D 1} ^{2} Portland acquired the draft rights to 31st pick Jeff Pendergraph from Sacramento in exchange for Sergio Rodríguez, the draft rights to 38th pick Jon Brockman and cash considerations.
- ^{E} Houston acquired the draft rights to 32nd pick Jermaine Taylor from Washington in exchange for cash considerations.
- ^{F} Houston acquired the draft rights to 34th pick Sergio Llull from Denver in exchange for cash considerations.
- ^{G} Miami acquired the draft rights to 42nd pick Patrick Beverley from the L.A. Lakers in exchange for a 2011 second-round draft pick and cash considerations.
- ^{H} New Orleans acquired the draft rights to 43rd pick Marcus Thornton from Miami in exchange for 2010 and 2012 second-round draft picks.
- ^{I} Houston acquired the draft rights to 44th pick Chase Budinger from Detroit in exchange for a future second-round draft pick and cash considerations.
- ^{J} Dallas acquired the draft rights to 45th pick Nick Calathes from Minnesota in exchange for a 2010 second-round draft pick and cash considerations.
- ^{K} Oklahoma City acquired the draft rights to 54th pick Robert Vaden from Charlotte in exchange for cash considerations.
- ^{L} Cleveland acquired the draft rights to 57th pick Emir Preldžić from Phoenix in exchange for cash considerations.

== Draft lottery ==
The lottery selection to determine the order of the top fourteen picks in the 2009 draft occurred on May 19, 2009. The Los Angeles Clippers won the first pick, while the Memphis Grizzlies and Oklahoma City Thunder moved up to second and third picks, respectively. The Sacramento Kings and Washington Wizards, who had the two best chances to land a top-three pick, fell down to the fourth and fifth spots, the lowest possible picks they could be awarded through the lottery. The remaining first-round picks and all the second-round picks were assigned to teams in reverse order of their win–loss records in the previous season. As is commonplace in the event of identical win–loss records, the NBA performed a random drawing to break the ties on April 17, 2009.

Below were the chances for each team to get specific picks in the 2009 draft lottery, rounded to three decimal places:

^	Denotes the actual lottery results

Team	2008–09 record	Lottery chances	Pick													
Team	2008–09 record	Lottery chances	1st	2nd	3rd	4th	5th	6th	7th	8th	9th	10th	11th	12th	13th	14th
Sacramento Kings	17–65	250	.250	.215	.177	.358^	—	—	—	—	—	—	—	—	—	—
Washington Wizards	19–63	178	.178	.174	.164	.347	.137^	—	—	—	—	—	—	—	—	—
Los Angeles Clippers	19–63	177	.177^	.173	.164	.195	.250	.040	—	—	—	—	—	—	—	—
Oklahoma City Thunder	23–59	119	.119	.126	.132^	.100	.350	.161	.013	—	—	—	—	—	—	—
Minnesota Timberwolves	24–58	76	.076	.084	.095	—	.263	.385^	.093	.004	—	—	—	—	—	—
Memphis Grizzlies	24–58	75	.075	.083^	.094	—	—	.414	.294	.039	.001	—	—	—	—	—
Golden State Warriors	29–53	43	.043	.049	.058	—	—	—	.600^	.232	.018	.000	—	—	—	—
New York Knicks	32–50	28	.028	.033	.039	—	—	—	—	.725^	.168	.008	.000	—	—	—
Toronto Raptors	33–49	17	.017	.020	.024	—	—	—	—	—	.813^	.122	.004	.000	—	—
Milwaukee Bucks	34–48	10	.010	.012	.014	—	—	—	—	—	—	.870^	.092	.002	.000	—
New Jersey Nets	34–48	9	.009	.011	.013	—	—	—	—	—	—	—	.904^	.063	.001	.000
Charlotte Bobcats	35–47	7	.007	.008	.010	—	—	—	—	—	—	—	—	.935^	.039	.000
Indiana Pacers	36–46	6	.006	.007	.009	—	—	—	—	—	—	—	—	—	.960^	.018
Phoenix Suns	46–36	5	.005	.006	.007	—	—	—	—	—	—	—	—	—	—	.982^

1: The Washington Wizards' pick was later traded to the Minnesota Timberwolves.^{[a]}

== Eligibility ==
The basic requirements for draft eligibility are:

- All drafted players must be born on or before December 31, 1990.
- Any player who is not an "international player", as defined in the collective bargaining agreement (CBA) between the NBA and its players union, must be at least one year removed from the graduation of his high school class.

The CBA defines "international players" as players who permanently resided outside the U.S. for three years prior to the draft, did not complete high school in the U.S., and have never enrolled at a U.S. college or university.

The basic requirement for automatic eligibility for a U.S. player is the completion of his college eligibility. Players who meet the CBA definition of "international players" are automatically eligible if their 22nd birthday falls during or before the calendar year of the draft (i.e., born on or before December 31, 1987). U.S. players who were at least one year removed from their high school graduation and have played professional basketball with a team outside the NBA were also automatically eligible. Former high school player Brandon Jennings meets these criteria, having graduated high school in 2008, skipped college basketball and then played professional basketball in Italy.

A player who is not automatically eligible must declare his eligibility for the draft by notifying the NBA offices in writing no later than 60 days before the draft. For the 2009 draft, this date fell on April 26. An early entry candidate is allowed to withdraw his eligibility for the draft by notifying the NBA offices in writing no later than 10 days before the draft. This year, a total of 74 collegiate players and 29 international players declared as early entry candidates. At the withdrawal deadline, 55 early-entry candidates withdrew from the draft, leaving 39 collegiate players and 10 international players as the early-entry candidates for the draft.

A player who has hired an agent will forfeit his remaining college eligibility, regardless of whether he is drafted. Also, while the collective bargaining agreement (CBA) between the league and its players' union allows a player to withdraw from the draft twice, the National Collegiate Athletic Association (NCAA) mandates that a player who has declared twice loses his college eligibility. This second provision affected Chase Budinger, Wayne Ellington, and Ty Lawson, all of whom declared for and withdrew from the 2008 draft.

=== Early entrants ===
==== College underclassmen ====
The following college basketball players successfully applied for early draft entrance.

- (United States) DeJuan Blair – F, Pittsburgh (sophomore)
- (United States) Derrick Brown – F, Xavier (junior)
- (United States) Chase Budinger – G, Arizona (junior)
- (Greece) / (United States) Nick Calathes – G, Florida (sophomore)
- (United States) Earl Clark – F, Louisville (junior)
- (United States) Kareem Cooper – C, UTEP (junior)
- (United States) Brandon Costner – F, NC State (junior)
- (United States) Stephen Curry – G, Davidson (junior)
- (United States) Austin Daye – F, Gonzaga (sophomore)
- (United States) DeMar DeRozan – G, USC (freshman)
- (United States) Eric Devendorf – G, Syracuse (junior)
- (United States) Wayne Ellington – G, North Carolina (junior)
- (Nigeria) / (United States) Chinemelu Elonu – F, Texas A&M (junior)
- (United States) Tyreke Evans – G, Memphis (freshman)
- (United States) Jonny Flynn – G, Syracuse (sophomore)
- (United States) Taj Gibson – F, USC (junior)
- (United States) Blake Griffin – F, Oklahoma (sophomore)
- (United States) D'Mond Grismore – F, Huston–Tillotson (junior)
- (United States) Roger Guignard – G, Texas–Arlington (junior)
- (United States) Daniel Hackett – G, USC (junior)
- (United States) James Harden – G, Arizona State (sophomore)
- (United States) Paul Harris – F, Syracuse (junior)
- (United States) Gerald Henderson Jr. – G, Duke (junior)
- (United States) Jordan Hill – F, Arizona (junior)
- (United States) Jrue Holiday – G, UCLA (freshman)
- (United States) James Johnson – F, Wake Forest (sophomore)
- (United States) Ty Lawson – G, North Carolina (junior)
- (United States) Darnell Lindsay – G, Tennessee Tech (junior)
- (United States) Jodie Meeks – G, Kentucky (junior)
- (United States) Nate Miles – G, Southern Idaho (freshman)
- (Australia) Patty Mills – G, Saint Mary's (sophomore)
- (United Kingdom) / (United States) Byron Mullens – C, Ohio State (freshman)
- (Nigeria) / (United States) Ronald Ogoke – C, Paul Quinn (junior)
- (United States) DaJuan Summers – F, Georgetown (junior)
- (United States) Shawn Taggart – F, Memphis (junior)
- (United States) Jeff Teague – G, Wake Forest (sophomore)
- (Tanzania) Hasheem Thabeet – C, Connecticut (junior)
- (United States) Dar Tucker – G, DePaul (sophomore)

==== International players ====
The following international players successfully applied for early draft entrance.

- Rodrigue Beaubois – G, Cholet (France)
- Omri Casspi – F, Maccabi Tel Aviv (Israel)
- Víctor Claver – F, Pamesa Valencia (Spain)
- (Democratic Republic of the Congo) Christian Eyenga – F, CB Prat (Spain)
- (Brazil) Vítor Faverani – F, Clinicas Rincón (Spain)
- Sergiy Gladyr – G, MBC Mykolaiv (Ukraine)
- Barış Hersek – F, Darüşşafaka (Turkey)
- Ricky Rubio – G, DKV Joventut (Spain)
- İbrahim Yıldırım – G, Banvit (Turkey)

=== Automatically eligible entrants ===
Players who do not meet the criteria for "international" players are automatically eligible if they meet any of the following criteria:

- They have no remaining college eligibility.
- If they graduated from high school in the U.S., but did not enroll in a U.S. college or university, four years have passed since their high school class graduated.
- They have signed a contract with a professional basketball team not in the NBA, anywhere in the world, and have played under the contract.

Players who meet the criteria for "international" players are automatically eligible if they meet any of the following criteria:

- They are at least 22 years old during the calendar year of the draft. In term of dates players born on or before December 31, 1987, were automatically eligible for the 2009 draft.
- They have signed a contract with a professional basketball team not in the NBA within the United States, and have played under that contract.

Other automatically eligible players
Player	Team	Note	Ref.
(United States) Patrick Beverley	Dnipro (Ukraine)	Left Arkansas in 2008; playing professionally since the 2008–09 season	
(Australia) Daniel Johnson	Melbourne Tigers (Australia)	Left Pepperdine in 2008; playing professionally since the 2008–09 season	
(Australia) Stephen Weigh	Perth Wildcats (Australia)	Left Utah in 2008; playing professionally since the 2008–09 season	

== Invited attendees ==
The 2009 NBA draft is considered to be the 31st NBA draft to have utilized what is properly considered the "green room" experience for NBA prospects. The NBA's green room is a staging area where anticipated draftees often sit with their families and representatives, waiting for their names to be called on draft night. Often being positioned either in front of or to the side of the podium (in this case, being positioned somewhere within The Theater at Madison Square Garden), once a player heard his name, he would walk to the podium to shake hands and take promotional photos with the NBA commissioner. From there, the players often conducted interviews with various media outlets while backstage. From there, the players often conducted interviews with various media outlets while backstage. However, once the NBA draft started to air nationally on TV starting with the 1980 NBA draft, the green room evolved from players waiting to hear their name called and then shaking hands with these select players who were often called to the hotel to take promotional pictures with the NBA commissioner a day or two after the draft concluded to having players in real-time waiting to hear their names called up and then shaking hands with David Stern, the NBA's commissioner at the time.

The NBA compiled its list of green room invites through collective voting by the NBA's team presidents and general managers alike, which in this year's case belonged to only what they believed were the top 15 prospects at the time. Despite the lower amount of invites for this year's draft when compared to the previous year's draft, there would still be some notable discrepancies involved with the invitations at hand between the missing invitations for #14 pick Earl Clark, #16 pick James Johnson, and arguably #18 pick Ty Lawson for a perfect invite listing alongside the missing invite for future All-Star Jeff Teague for a perfect top 19 invitation listing. With that said, the following players were invited to attend this year's draft festivities live and in person.

- (United States) Stephen Curry – PG, Davidson
- (United States) Austin Daye – SF/PF, Gonzaga
- (United States) DeMar DeRozan – SG/SF, USC
- (United States) Tyreke Evans – SG/SF, Memphis
- (United States) Jonny Flynn – PG, Syracuse
- (United States) Blake Griffin – PF, Oklahoma
- (United States) James Harden – PG/SG, Arizona State
- (United States) Tyler Hansbrough – PF/C, North Carolina
- (United States) Gerald Henderson – SG, Duke
- (United States) Jordan Hill – PF/C, Arizona
- (United States) Jrue Holiday – PG/SG, UCLA
- (United States) Brandon Jennings – PG, Lottomatica Roma (Italy)
- Ricky Rubio – PG, DKV Joventut (Spain)
- (Tanzania) Hasheem Thabeet – C, Connecticut
- (United States) Terrence Williams – SG/SF, Louisville

== See also ==
- List of first overall NBA draft picks
