= Marcus Keene =

American basketball player (born 1995)

- Keene with Trabzonspor in 2026

No. 1 – Trabzonspor
- Position: Point guard
- League: Basketbol Süper Ligi; FIBA Champions League

Personal information
- Born: May 6, 1995 (age 31) Germany
- Listed height: 5 ft 9 in (1.75 m)
- Listed weight: 176 lb (80 kg)

Career information
- High school: Warren (San Antonio, Texas)
- College: Youngstown State (2013–2015); Central Michigan (2016–2017)
- NBA draft: 2017: undrafted
- Playing career: 2017–present

Career history
- 2017–2018: Cagliari Dinamo Academy
- 2018: Mono Vampire
- 2018–2019: Memphis Hustle
- 2019: KCC Egis
- 2019: Formosa Dreamers
- 2019–2020: Yulon Luxgen Dinos
- 2020–2021: Kalev
- 2021: Cedevita Olimpija
- 2022: Varese
- 2022–2023: SIG Strasbourg
- 2023: Prometey
- 2023–2024: Beijing Ducks
- 2024–2025: Maroussi
- 2025: UNICS Kazan
- 2025–2026: SIG Strasbourg
- 2026–present: Trabzonspor

Career highlights
- All-LNB Élite Second Team (2026); LNB Élite assists leader (2026); Lega Serie A Top Scorer (2022); All-VTB United League First Team (2021); VTB United League Top Scorer (2021); Latvian–Estonian League champion (2021); Estonian Cup winner (2020); FIBA Asia Champions Cup Top Scorer (2018); AP honorable mention All-American (2017); NCAA scoring champion (2017); First-team All-MAC (2017)

Marcus Johnny Rashaan Keene (born May 6, 1995) is an American professional basketball player for Trabzonspor of the Turkish Basketbol Süper Ligi (BSL) and the FIBA Champions League.

He gained national prominence in 2016–17 season as a redshirt junior while at Central Michigan University, having been profiled by Sports Illustrated, the NCAA, and ESPN because of his prolific scoring ability. Keene is a 5'9" point guard who averaged 30.0 points per game his junior year at Central Michigan, the highest average in NCAA Division I men's basketball that season.

== High school career ==
Keene born in a military hospital in Germany, where his parents were serving in the Air Force. Keene attended Earl Warren High School in San Antonio, Texas, where scored over 1,600 points in his career and graduated as the school's all-time leading scorer. During Keene's sophomore and junior years combined he scored 781 points, and in his senior season alone he scored 869. Keene's junior year saw him get named to the all-state, all-city, and Super-City Team. In Keene's senior season, he averaged 25 points, four rebounds, and four assists per game. He only had one Division I scholarship offer heading into his senior year, Youngstown State, which he accepted.

== College career ==
=== Youngstown State ===
Keene's freshman season at Youngstown State (2013–14) saw him have moderate success. He averaged 6.5 points per game in 22 games played, including one start. He totaled 149 points on the year. In 2014–15, his season was "up and down," but he performed well by averaging 15.6 points per game, which led the team and was sixth-highest in the Horizon League. At one point he was suspended for breaking a teammate's nose, and his overall satisfaction was not high; Keene wanted to play point guard but had been designated as a spot-up shooting guard. After a game against Central Michigan, whose up-tempo offense and "free-wheeling" style of play appealed to Keene, he had a conversation with a Central Michigan assistant coach. Keene then chose to transfer shortly thereafter.

=== Central Michigan ===
In 2015–16, Keene had to sit out his first season at Central Michigan due to NCAA transfer eligibility rules. During that season he played as a scout teamer against the starters but he frequently dominated them. One time, Keene scored 37 points against them in a scrimmage. Fellow guard Braylon Rayson said, "We couldn’t do nothing with him. It was to the point where we just had to live with it."

Keene exploded onto the national college basketball scene when he became eligible in 2016–17. Through YouTube-worthy highlights, SportsCenter Top 10 game-winning shots, and his nation-leading scoring average, sports media have paid attention to him. On January 21, 2017, Keene scored 50 points against Miami (Ohio), including 10 made three-point field goals. It was the highest single game scoring output by anyone in Division I that season. On February 9, he was named as a top-20 finalist for the John R. Wooden Award, given annually to the nation's best player. Keene finished the 2016–17 season averaging 30.0 points per game, becoming the first player to average at least 30 points since LIU Brooklyn's Charles Jones during the 1996–97 season 20 years earlier. On March 14, it was announced that Keene would test his 2017 NBA draft stock, with him having the option to return to Central Michigan before the NBA draft lottery is set. One month later, Keene signed an agent, thus ending his collegiate eligibility.

=== College statistics ===
*	Led NCAA Division I

Year	Team	GP	GS	MPG	FG%	3P%	FT%	RPG	APG	SPG	BPG	PPG
2013–14	Youngstown State	22	1	16.3	.370	.324	.757	1.9	2.2	.5	.0	6.5
2014–15	Youngstown State	32	32	34.9	.449	.419	.787	3.5	2.8	1.1	.1	15.6
2016–17	Central Michigan	32	32	36.8	.447	.368	.819	4.5	4.9	.8	.0	30.0*
Career		86	65	30.9	.440	.381	.805	3.5	3.4	.8	.0	18.6

== Professional career ==
=== Dinamo Academy Cagliari (2017–2018) ===
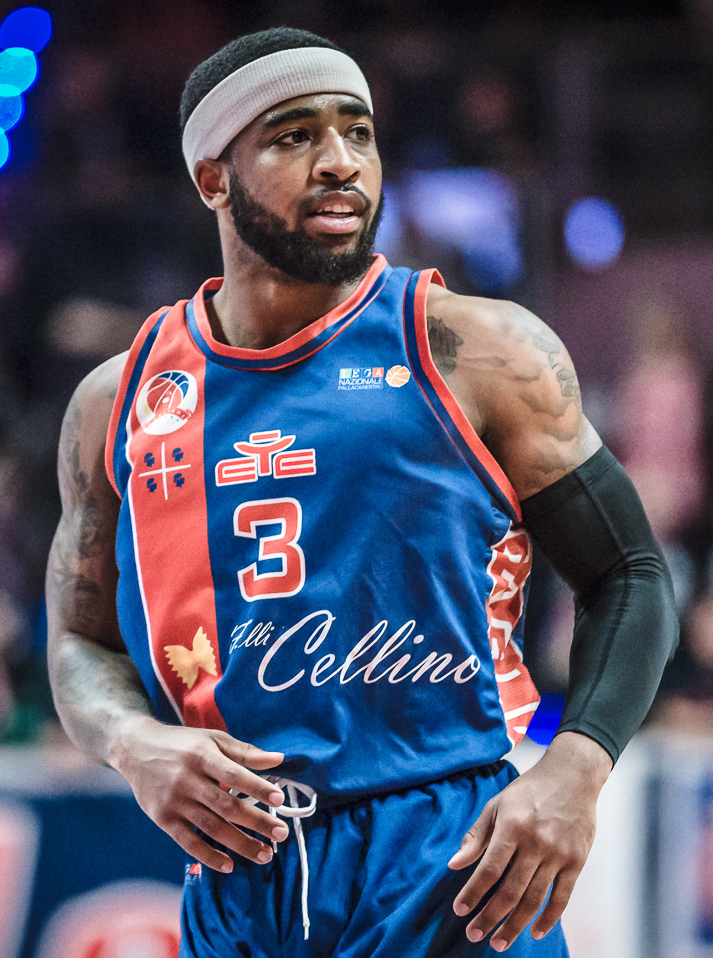
Keene with Cagliari Dinamo Academy in 2018

After going undrafted in the 2017 NBA draft, he joined the Washington Wizards for the 2017 NBA Summer League. After failing to be signed to a regular season contract with the Wizards, Keene signed to play in Italy's Serie A2 Basket league for the Cagliari Dinamo Academy. He averaged 18.8 points, 4.5 rebounds and 2.9 assists over 30 games in his first season.

=== Memphis Hustle (2018–2019) ===
On December 7, 2018, Keene signed with the Memphis Hustle of the NBA G League.

=== KCC Egis (2019–2020) ===
On March 1, 2019, Keene signed with the KCC Egis of the Korean Basketball League (KBL).

=== The Basketball Tournament (2019–present) ===
Keene participated in The Basketball Tournament with Sideline Cancer. He started all 3 games leading the team to the Sweet 16 and to The Basketball Tournament 2019 Wichita Regional Championship Game. Keene returned to Sideline Cancer in 2020 and was the catalyst behind it advancing to its first TBT championship game. He was named to his first ever All TBT team. In 2021, Keene advanced his team as a #1 seed to the Elite 8 and he earned his 2nd All TBT selection. Keene played for Sideline Cancer in 2022 and 2023 before switching to Best Virginia in 2024, and the AfterShocks starting in 2025. He helped the AfterShocks win tournament the 2025 TBT, claiming MVP along the way.

=== Yulon Luxgen Dinos (2019–2020) ===
Keene signed with Yulon Luxgen Dinos of the Super Basketball League in Taiwan. He was named the Player of the Week for January 12–19, 2020.

=== Kalev/Cramo (2020–2021) ===
On August 27, 2020, Keene signed with Kalev/Cramo in the top tier Latvian–Estonian Basketball League.

=== Cedevita Olimpija (2021) ===
On July 4, 2021, Keene signed with Cedevita Olimpija in the top tier Slovenian Basketball League. After playing in 11 games in which he averaged 11.6 points and 3.1 assists per game, he parted ways with the team on November 14.

=== Pallacanestro Varese (2021–2022) ===
On November 16, 2021, Keene signed with Pallacanestro Varese of the Italian Lega Basket Serie A.

=== SIG Strasbourg (2022–2023) ===
On July 1, 2022, Keene signed with SIG Strasbourg of the French LNB Pro A.

=== Prometey (2023) ===
On June 29, 2023, Keene signed with Prometey of the Latvian-Estonian Basketball League.

=== Beijing Ducks (2023–2024) ===
On November 30, 2023, Keene signed with Beijing Ducks of the Chinese Basketball Association.

=== Maroussi (2024–2025) ===
On November 5, 2024, Keene signed with Maroussi of the Greek Basketball League (GBL) and the FIBA Europe Cup (FEC).

=== Return to SIG Strasbourg (2025–2026) ===
On July 16, 2025, he signed with SIG Strasbourg of the French LNB Pro A for a second stint.

=== Trabzonspor (2026–present) ===
On June 3, 2026, he signed with Trabzonspor of the Basketbol Süper Ligi (BSL).

== See also ==
- List of NCAA Division I men's basketball season 3-point field goal leaders
