= Los Angeles Ignite =

American basketball club

- Nickname: LA Ignite
- League: The Basketball League & The Basketball Tournament
- Founded: 2024
- History: Los Angeles Ignite; 2024–
- Arena: Eagle's Nest Arena
- Location: Los Angeles, California
- Team colors
- General manager: Dwight Walton
- Head coach: Vicken Eskidjian
- Website: Official website
HOME	AWAY

The Los Angeles Ignite are an American professional basketball team based out of Los Angeles, California, a member of The Basketball League (TBL), and a member of The Basketball Tournament (TBT).

== History ==
In April 2024, The Basketball Tournament (TBT), announced a new team called the Los Angeles Ignite. That same month, The Basketball League announced that the team would join for the 2024 TBL season. That season, they went 19-1 and lost in the semifinals. The TBL later announced that the team wouldn't compete for the 2025 TBL season.

In TBT 2024, they were listed as the #8 seed in the Houston Regional, they lost 78-63 to North Texas Alumni Bleed Green. In TBT 2025, the team made it all the way to the regional championship, but loss to Sideline Cancer.

Season	League	Regular season					Postseason	Head coach
Season	League	Finish	Played	Wins	Losses	Win %	Postseason	Head coach
Los Angeles Ignite
2024	TBL	3rd	20	19	1	.950	3rd	Vicken Eskidjian
Playoff record				6	4	2	.667	0 championships

=== TBT ===
==== 2024 ====
Date	Round	Location	Score	Opponent
July 19	First round	Houston, Texas	63–78	Bleed Green

==== 2025 ====
Date	Round	Location	Score	Opponent
July 18	First round	Louisville, Kentucky	93–82	Team Diesel
July 20	Second round	Louisville, Kentucky	83–79	Team 901
July 23	Third Round (Louisville Regional Championship)	Louisville, Kentucky	71–74	Sideline Cancer

== Roster ==
Note: Flags indicate national team eligibility at FIBA-sanctioned events. Players may hold other non-FIBA nationalities not displayed.

Los Angeles Ignite roster
Players
Coaches

Pos.	No.	Nat.	Name	Ht.	Wt.	Age
F	1	(United States)	Glover, Tymoryae	6 ft 7 in (2.01 m)	169 lb (77 kg)	30 – 18 December 1995
G	5	(United States)	Terrel, JT	6 ft 3 in (1.91 m)	185 lb (84 kg)	34 – 24 November 1991
F/C	11	(United States)	Helligar, Warren	6 ft 7 in (2.01 m)	216 lb (98 kg)	31 – 11 June 1994
G	12	(United States)	Smith, Tarin	6 ft 2 in (1.88 m)	185 lb (84 kg)	30 – 6 December 1995
G	24	(United States)	Tucker, Dakarai	6 ft 5 in (1.96 m)	195 lb (88 kg)	31 – 13 May 1994
C	32	(United States)	Carter II, Terrel	6 ft 10 in (2.08 m)	216 lb (98 kg)	31 – 7 January 1995
F/C	55	(United States)	Stormo, Jackson	6 ft 9 in (2.06 m)	260 lb (120 kg)	26 – 16 November 1999
G	55	(United States)	Gredic, Kwah	5 ft 11 in (1.80 m)		−1990–1991 – January 1992
F/C	31	(United States)	Bell, Jordan	6 ft 7 in (2.01 m)	216 lb (98 kg)	30 – 6 January 1996

Head coach

- Vicken Eskidjian

Assistant coach(es)

- Anthony McGuire

Legend

- (C) Team captain
- Injured
