= Farid Aslani =

Iranian basketball player

Farid Aslani (Persian : فرید اصلانی)
No. 6 – Zob Ahan Isfahan BC
- Position: Point guard
- League: IBSL

Personal information
- Born: July 4, 1988 (age 38) Tehran, Iran
- Listed height: 6 ft 0 in (1.83 m)
- Listed weight: 181 lb (82 kg)

Career history
- 2021-2022: Zob Ahan Isfahan BC
- 2020-2021: Zob Ahan Isfahan BC
- 2019-2020: Mahram Tehran
- 2018-2019: Petrochimi Bandar Imam
- 2017-2018: Palayesh Naft Abadan BC
- 2016-2017: Palayesh Naft Abadan BC
- 2015-2016: Chemidor Qom
- 2014-2015: Mahram Tehran
- 2013-2014: Mahram Tehran
- 2012-2013: Mahram Tehran
- 2011-2012: Mahram Tehran
- 2010-2011: Azad University

Career highlights
- FIBA Asian Club champion (2018)
Medals
Men's basketball
Representing Iran
WABA Championship
Gold medal – first place	2010 Duhok
Gold medal – first place	2016 Amman
Asian Games
Silver medal – second place	2014 Incheon	Team
FIBA Asia Cup
Gold medal – first place	2012 Japan
Gold medal – first place	2016 Tehran
Silver medal – second place	2017 Beirut
WABA Champions Cup
Bronze medal – third place	2017 Amman
Silver medal – second place	2019 Baghdad
FIBA Asia Champions Cup
Gold medal – first place	2018 Nonthaburi
William Jones Cup
Silver medal – second place	2012 Nonthaburi
Gold medal – first place	2015 Nonthaburi

Farid Aslani (Persian: فرید اصلانی, born July 4, 1988) is an Iranian professional basketball player. He is 6' (183 cm), plays as a Point guard. He has played for Iranian Basketball Clubs including Azad University Tehran, Mahram Tehran, Palayesh Naft Abadan, Petrochimi Bandar Imam, Zob Ahan Isfahan. He also competed in the 2018 FIBA Asia Champions Cup, and his brilliance in these competitions made him more popular among the fans of the Iran Basketball League. He is especially popular among league fans in southern Iran due to his long and colorful presence in the Naft Abadan and Petrochimi.
