= İbrahim Yıldırım =

Turkish basketball player

Personal information
- Born: 15 January 1990 (age 36) Uşak, Turkey
- Listed height: 6 ft 3 in (1.91 m)
- Listed weight: 176 lb (80 kg)

Career information
- Playing career: 2006–present
- Position: Point guard / shooting guard

Career history
- 2006–2011: Banvit
- 2011–2012: Bandırma Kırmızı
- 2012–2013: Tofaş
- 2013–2015: Uşak Sportif
- 2015–2016: Trabzonspor
- 2016–2018: Afyon Belediye
- 2018–2019: Best Balıkesir
- 2019–2020: Torku Konyaspor
- 2020: Fethiye Belediyespor
- 2020–2022: Balıkesir Büyükşehir Belediyespor

İbrahim Yıldırım (born 15 January 1990) is a Turkish professional basketball player who last played for Balıkesir Büyükşehir Belediyespor of the Turkish Basketball First League (TBL), who played as a combo guard. During the 2021-22 season, he averaged 3.2 points, 1.5 rebounds, and 1.5 assists per game. Yıldırım parted ways with the team on 1 January 2022.
