= DaJuan Summers =

American basketball player (born 1988)

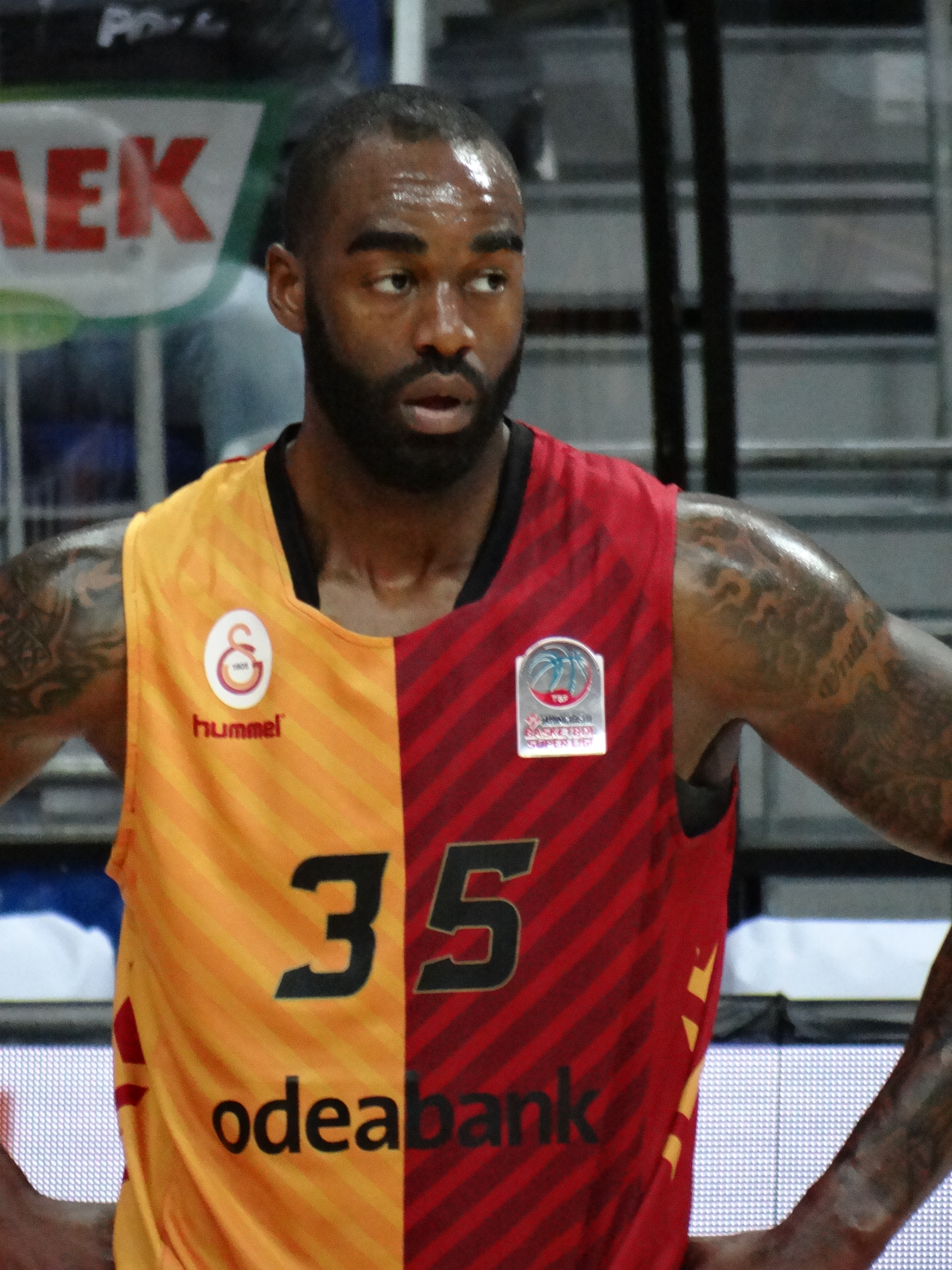

Free agent
- Position: Small forward

Personal information
- Born: January 24, 1988 (age 38) Baltimore, Maryland, U.S.
- Listed height: 6 ft 8 in (2.03 m)
- Listed weight: 240 lb (109 kg)

Career information
- High school: McDonogh School (Owings Mills, Maryland)
- College: Georgetown (2006–2009)
- NBA draft: 2009: 2nd round, 35th overall pick
- Drafted by: Detroit Pistons
- Playing career: 2009–present

Career history
- 2009–2011: Detroit Pistons
- 2011: Montepaschi Siena
- 2011–2012: New Orleans Hornets
- 2012–2013: Maine Red Claws
- 2013: Los Angeles Clippers
- 2013–2014: Budivelnyk Kyiv
- 2014–2015: Gran Canaria
- 2015: Westchester Knicks
- 2016–2017: Pınar Karşıyaka
- 2017–2018: Galatasaray
- 2018: Seoul SK Knights
- 2019–2020: Shimane Susanoo Magic
- 2021: Mahram Tehran
- 2021: Al-Ittihad Jeddah
- 2022: Mahram Tehran
- 2023: Homenetmen Beirut
- 2023: Al-Muharraq
- 2023: Rain or Shine Elasto Painters
- 2024: Goyang Sono Skygunners
- 2024–2025: Al-Difaa Al-Jawi
- 2025: Piratas de La Guaira

Career highlights
- FIBA Asia Champions Cup First Team (2018); Turkish League All-Star (2017); UBL champion (2014); Ukrainian Cup winner (2014); All-NBA D-League Third Team (2013); NBA Development League All-Star (2013); Big East All-Rookie Team (2007)
- Stats at NBA.com
- Stats at Basketball Reference

DaJuan Michael Summers (born January 24, 1988) is an American professional basketball player who last played for the Piratas de La Guaira of the Superliga Profesional de Baloncesto (SPB). He played college basketball for the Georgetown Hoyas. In the 2009 NBA draft, he was drafted 35th overall by the Detroit Pistons.

== High school career ==
Summers attended the McDonogh School, a private school in Owings Mills, Maryland. As a junior in 2004–05, he averaged 20.4 points and 11.6 rebounds per game, helping McDonogh to a 23–6 record and to the MIAA A Conference final and a No. 5 ranking in the Baltimore Sun's final poll.

As a senior in 2005–06, he averaged 29.2 points, 11.0 rebounds, 4.0 assists, 2.0 steals and 3.0 blocks per game, leading McDonogh to a 19–6 overall record. He finished his high school career with 1,502 points and a two-time Baltimore Sun Baltimore County Player of the Year (junior and senior).

Considered a five-star recruit by Rivals.com, Summers was listed as the No. 9 small forward and the No. 23 player in the nation in 2006.

== College career ==
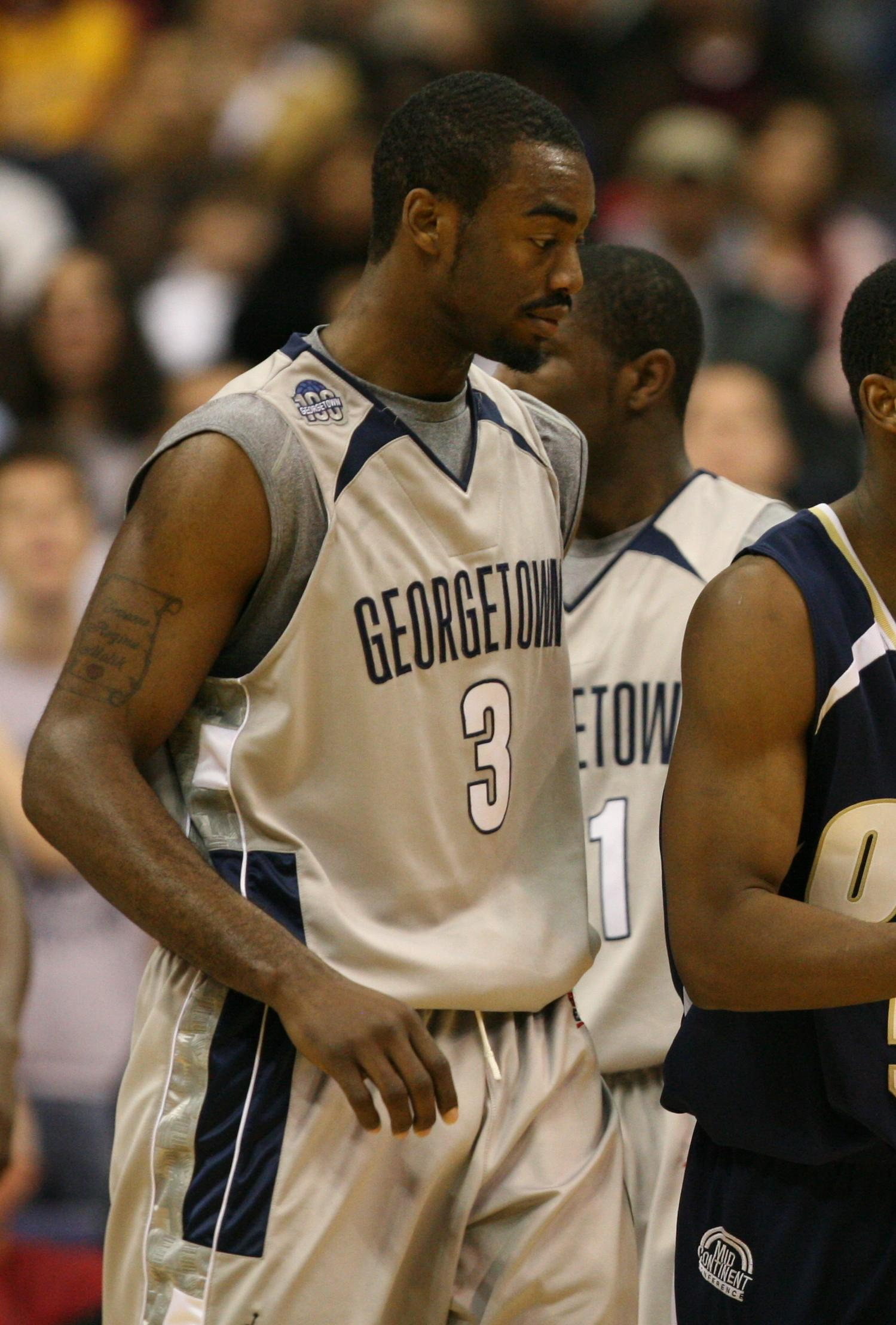
Summers at Georgetown.

In his freshman season at Georgetown, Summers was named to the 2007 Big East All-Rookie team. In 37 games, he averaged 9.2 points, 3.7 rebounds and 1.1 assists per game.

In his sophomore season, he was a second team All-District 4 selection by the National Association of Basketball Coaches. In 33 games, he averaged 11.1 points, 5.4 rebounds and 1.5 assists per game.

In his junior season, he played 31 games, averaging 13.6 points, 4.1 rebounds, 1.3 assists and 1.1 steals per game.

On March 30, 2009, he declared for the NBA draft, foregoing his final year of college eligibility.

== Professional career ==
On June 25, 2009, Summers was selected with the 35th overall pick in the 2009 NBA draft by the Detroit Pistons. In July 2009, he joined the Pistons for the 2009 NBA Summer League. In August 2009, he signed a multi-year deal with the Pistons. In July 2010, he re-joined the Pistons for the 2010 NBA Summer League.

On July 3, 2011, he signed a two-year deal with Montepaschi Siena of Italy. On October 30, 2011, he parted ways with Siena after just four games.

On December 9, 2011, he signed with the New Orleans Hornets. On February 7, 2012, he was waived by the Hornets.

In September 2012, Summers signed with the Charlotte Bobcats. However, he was later waived by the Bobcats on October 27, 2012.

On December 3, 2012, Summers was acquired by the Maine Red Claws. On February 4, 2013, Summers was named to the Futures All-Star roster for the 2013 NBA D-League All-Star Game.

On March 15, 2013, Summers signed a 10-day contract with the Los Angeles Clippers. On March 25, 2013, he signed a second 10-day contract with the Clippers. On April 4, 2013, he signed with the Clippers for the remainder of the season. On July 9, 2013, Summers was waived by the Clippers.

On July 31, 2013, Summers signed a one-year deal with Budivelnyk Kyiv of the Ukrainian Basketball SuperLeague. He sent his family home from Kyiv due to political unrest in Ukraine, but stayed to finish the season.

In July 2014, Summers joined the Brooklyn Nets for the 2014 NBA Summer League. On August 12, 2014, he signed with Gran Canaria of the Liga ACB.

On September 22, 2015, Summers signed with the New York Knicks. However, he was later waived by the Knicks on October 23 after appearing in four preseason games. On November 2, he was acquired by the Westchester Knicks as an affiliate player of New York. On November 23, he was named the D-League's Performer of the Week for games played Thursday, November 12, through Sunday, November 22. The honor marked the first of the 2015–16 season and the first in Westchester Knicks history. The following day, he was ruled out for the rest of the season with a left Achilles tendon injury, an injury he suffered on November 20 in the final two minutes of the team's win over the Sioux Falls Skyforce and was waived on November 24. In three games, Summers led the Knicks to a 3–0 start and averaged 25.3 points, 10.3 rebounds, 2.0 assists and 2.0 steals per game.

On July 28, 2016, Summers signed with Turkish club Pınar Karşıyaka for the 2016–17 season.

On August 3, 2017, he signed with Turkish club Galatasaray for the 2017–18 season.

On July 12, 2019, he has signed with Levallois Metropolitans of the LNB Pro A. Summers later joined Shimane Susanoo Magic, averaging 17.4 points, 8.0 rebounds, 1.3 assists and 1.1 steals per game. On October 11, 2020, he signed with Indios de Mayagüez of the Baloncesto Superior Nacional (BSN).

In September 2023, Summers signed with the Rain or Shine Elasto Painters of the Philippine Basketball Association (PBA) as the team's import for the 2023–24 PBA Commissioner's Cup. After a 0–4 start, he was released from the team and replaced by Demetrius Treadwell.

== Career statistics ==
Legend
GP	Games played	GS	Games started	MPG	Minutes per game
FG%	Field-goal percentage	3P%	3-point field-goal percentage	FT%	Free-throw percentage
RPG	Rebounds per game	APG	Assists per game	SPG	Steals per game
BPG	Blocks per game	PPG	Points per game	PIR	Performance index rating
**Bold**	Career high

=== NBA ===
==== Regular season ====
Year	Team	GP	GS	MPG	FG%	3P%	FT%	RPG	APG	SPG	BPG	PPG
2009–10	Detroit	**44**	0	9.2	.354	.357	.711	1.0	.4	.2	**.2**	3.0
2010–11	Detroit	22	1	9.0	.406	**.429**	.450	.5	.1	.1	.0	3.4
2011–12	New Orleans	15	**6**	**13.9**	**.431**	.313	**.778**	**1.5**	**.7**	**.5**	.0	**4.5**
2012–13	L.A. Clippers	2	0	3.5	.250	.000	.000	1.0	.5	.0	.0	1.0
Career		83	7	9.9	.384	.367	.642	1.0	.3	.2	.1	3.3

=== Euroleague ===
Year	Team	GP	GS	MPG	FG%	3P%	FT%	RPG	APG	SPG	BPG	PPG	PIR
2011–12	Montepaschi Siena	1	1	18.4	**.500**	.000	.000	1.0	.0	.0	.0	4.0	.0
2013–14	Budivelnyk Kyiv	**10**	**8**	**27.8**	.426	**.222**	**.806**	**4.6**	**1.0**	**1.5**	**.6**	**12.3**	**12.5**
Career		11	9	26.9	.436	.222	.806	4.3	.9	1.4	.5	11.5	11.4
