= Marwan Ziadeh =

Lebanese basketball player

Marwan Ziadeh مروان زيادة
No. 77 – Homenetmen
- Position: Power forward / center
- League: Lebanese Basketball League

Personal information
- Born: February 10, 1987 (age 39) Beirut, Lebanon
- Listed height: 2.02 m (6 ft 8 in)
- Listed weight: 105 kg (231 lb)

Career information
- Playing career: 2008–present

Career history
- 2008–2009: Blue Stars
- 2009–2012: Hoops Club
- 2012–2014: Al Mouttahed Tripoli
- 2014–2016: Hoops Club
- 2016–2017: Al Mouttahed Tripoli
- 2017–2018: Club Antonin Sportif
- 2018–2019: Homenetmen Beirut
- 2019–2021: Beirut Club
- 2021–2022: Champville
- 2022–2023: Sagesse
- 2023–2024: Al Riyadi Club Beirut
- 2024–2025: Tadamon Zouk
- 2025–2026: Beirut Club
- 2026–present: Homenetmen Beirut

Career highlights
- Lebanese Supercup (2019)

Marwan Ziadeh (also spelled Ziade, Arabic: مروان زيادة; born 10 February 1987) is a Lebanese professional basketball player for Homenetmen Beirut of the Lebanese Basketball League (LBL). Standing at 2.02 m (6' 8") and weighing 105 kg (231 lb), he plays as a power forward or center. Ziadeh has played for multiple teams in the Lebanese Basketball League (LBL) and in international competitions.

== Club career ==
Ziade began his senior career in the Lebanese Basketball League during the late 2000s. He has played for several club teams, including Sporting Al Riyadi Beirut, Beirut Club, Hoops, Tadamon, and Al Moutahed Tripoli.
