= The Basketball Tournament 2024 =

Single elimination basketball tournament

The Basketball Tournament
- 2024

Tournament information
- Location: Regional sites: Butler University (Indianapolis); Cincinnati, Ohio; Dayton, Ohio; Houston, Texas; Lexington, Kentucky; Louisville, Kentucky; Pittsburgh, Pennsylvania; Wichita, Kansas; Semifinal/Championship site: Philadelphia, Pennsylvania
- Dates: July 19–August 4, 2024
- Tournament format: Single elimination
- Participants: 64 teams
- Purse: Championship: US$1,000,000 winner-take-all

Final positions
- Champions: Carmen's Crew
- Runner-up: Forever Coogs

Tournament statistics
- MVP: Jared Sullinger
- Top scorer: Rob Gray (110)
- Games played: 63

The Basketball Tournament 2024 was the eleventh edition of The Basketball Tournament (TBT), a 5-on-5, single elimination basketball tournament with a $1 million winner-take-all prize. The tournament, involving 64 teams, began on July 19 and ended on August 4 with the championship game at the Daskalakis Athletic Center in Philadelphia, Pennsylvania. The tournament format was similar to that of the last edition in 2023—64 teams, each playing in one of eight regionals.

The event had a "championship week", starting with the regional winners advancing to quarterfinals at one of two sites, Houston and Louisville. The quarterfinal winners then traveled to Philadelphia for the semifinals and championship game. Carmen's Crew, a team mostly made up of Ohio State alumni, won the tournament.

== Format ==
For its 2024 edition, TBT retained its traditional 64-team format and eight-region format, with each regional involving eight teams at a single host site (similar in format to the NCAA Division II men's and women's tournaments).

The teams and the regional placements for all entrants were revealed in a selection special hosted by Andrew Zoldan with John Fanta that aired on TBT's YouTube channel on June 26, 2024.

As with previous years, all tournament games operate with the "Elam Ending", a format of ending the game without use of a game clock. Under the Elam Ending, the clock is turned off at the first dead-ball whistle with 4 minutes or less to play in the game. At that time, a target score, equal to the score of the leading team (or tied teams) plus eight, is set, and the first team to reach this target score is declared the winner of the game. Thus, all games end on a made basket (field goal or free throw) and there is no overtime.

== Venues ==
The Basketball Tournament 2024 featured games in nine locations, eight of which hosted a regional. The ninth hosted the championship weekend (two semifinal contests and the championship game). Official regional names, if different from the location names, are indicated in the listings below the location names.

Regional sites only Regional and quarterfinal site Championship site	Butler (Indianapolis)	Cincinnati	Dayton
Regional sites only Regional and quarterfinal site Championship site	Hinkle Fieldhouse	Fifth Third Arena	UD Arena
Regional sites only Regional and quarterfinal site Championship site	Capacity: 12,012	Capacity: 13,409	Capacity: 7,100
Regional sites only Regional and quarterfinal site Championship site	Houston	Lexington (Kentucky)	Louisville
Regional sites only Regional and quarterfinal site Championship site	Fertitta Center	Rupp Arena	Freedom Hall
Regional sites only Regional and quarterfinal site Championship site	Capacity: 9,100	Capacity: 20,500	Capacity: 18,865
Regional sites only Regional and quarterfinal site Championship site	Pittsburgh	Wichita (Wichita State)	Philadelphia (Drexel, Championship)
Regional sites only Regional and quarterfinal site Championship site	Petersen Events Center	Charles Koch Arena	Daskalakis Athletic Center
Regional sites only Regional and quarterfinal site Championship site	Capacity: 12,508	Capacity: 10,506	Capacity: 2,509

== Teams ==
TBT has a history of teams rostered primarily with alumni from specific NCAA Division I college basketball programs; 29 such teams entered the 2024 tournament. One is drawn from NCAA Division II alumni, another is drawn from NCAA Division III alumni.

Name	College or sponsor affiliation	Source of team name	Region
305 Ballers	—	Main area code for Miami, Florida, where the team is based	Lexington
AfterShocks	Wichita State alumni	School nickname of Shockers	Wichita
All Good Dawgs	Butler alumni	School nickname of Bulldogs	Butler
Assembly Ball	Indiana alumni	Assembly Hall home arena	Butler
Austin's Own	Texas alumni	School location in Austin	Houston
Best Virginia	West Virginia alumni		Pittsburgh
Bleed Green	North Texas alumni	School nickname of Mean Green	Houston
Brotherly Love Pro Am Foundation	—		Pittsburgh
Brown Ballers	—	Made up of brown athletes	Cincinnati
Carmen's Crew	Ohio State alumni	"Carmen Ohio", Ohio State's school song	Dayton
D2 Waymakers	—	Former NCAA Division II athletes	Lexington
DaGuys STL	—	Team YouTube channel, with players mainly from Greater St. Louis	Dayton
Dream 34	Wendell Scott Foundation	Formerly "Virginia Dream", Scott's racing number was 34)	Cincinnati
Dubois Dream	—	Based out of Dubois, Pennsylvania	Pittsburgh
Eberlein Drive	—	Team owners' home street	Butler
Fail Harder	—		Butler
Florida TNT	—		Wichita
Forever Coogs	Houston alumni	Houston Cougars mascot	Houston
Fort Wayne Champs	—	Players with connections to Fort Wayne, Indiana	Butler
Happy Valley Hoopers	Penn State alumni	Location of the school in Happy Valley	Pittsburgh
Heartfire	MedImpact	Arizona nonprofit HeartFire Missions, a provider of Christian medical mission trips	Dayton
Herd That	Marshall alumni	School nickname of Thundering Herd	Lexington
Herkimer Originals	—	ABA team from Herkimer, New York	Pittsburgh
Jackson TN Underdawgs	—	Players with connections to Jackson, Tennessee	Lexington
LA Cheaters	Drew League		Wichita
La Familia	Kentucky alumni	Ode to recently departed coach John Calipari's Italian heritage; also name of a UK basketball NIL collective	Lexington
Los Angeles Ignite	—	TBL team from Los Angeles	Houston
Mass Street	Kansas alumni	Short for Massachusetts Street, the main street through the central business district of the school's home of Lawrence	Wichita
Men of Mackey	Purdue alumni	Purdue home court Mackey Arena	Butler
Midtown Prestige	—	TBL team from Wichita, Kansas	Wichita
Million $ Worth of Game	—		Pittsburgh
Nasty Nati	Cincinnati alumni	Nickname of the city of Cincinnati	Cincinnati
Once a Bronco	Boise State alumni	Boise State Broncos mascot	Houston
Purple Hearts	—	Gun violence awareness	Dayton
Purple Reign	Kansas State alumni	Kansas State school colors	Wichita
Ram Up	Colorado State alumni	School nickname of Rams	Wichita
Red Rose Thunder	—	ECBL team from Lancaster, Pennsylvania	Cincinnati
Red Scare	Dayton alumni	Name of Dayton student section	Dayton
Rise & Grind	—		Dayton
Run DFW	—	Based in the Dallas-Fort Worth area	Louisville
Shield 219	Valparaiso alumni	—	Butler
Sideline Cancer	—	Pancreatic cancer awareness	Louisville
Stars of Storrs	UConn alumni	Charles and Augustus Storrs, establishers of the Storrs Agricultural School (now the University of Connecticut)	Pittsburgh
Sweet Home Alabama	—	Players from the state of Alabama	Dayton
Takeover BC	—		Cincinnati
Team Aboutbillions	About Billions	Production company of Adrien Broner	Cincinnati
Team Arkansas	Arkansas alumni		Butler
Team Colorado	Colorado alumni		Wichita
Team Diesel	—		Louisville
Team DRC	Dominique Rodgers-Cromartie		Louisville
Team Fredette	—	Team member and organizer Jimmer Fredette	Louisville
Team Gibson	—	Team sponsor Taj Gibson	Cincinnati
The Challenge ALS	—		Houston
The Enchantment	New Mexico alumni	State nickname: "Land of Enchantment"	Houston
The Nawf	—	Team representing Gwinnett County, GA also known as “Nawf” Atlanta	Lexington
The Program NYC for Autism	—		Houston
The Ville	Louisville alumni	City nickname	Louisville
UKnighted	Bellarmine alumni	Bellarmine Knights nickname and mascot	Louisville
Veniceball	—		Louisville
War Ready	Auburn alumni	School battle cry "War Eagle"	Lexington
We Are D3	NCAA Division III alumni		Dayton
Woco Showtime	Wofford alumni	Institutional name of Wofford College	Lexington
Zip Em Up	Xavier alumni	Former Xavier team motto	Cincinnati
Zoo Crew	Pittsburgh alumni	Oakland Zoo student section	Pittsburgh

Note: team names are per the TBT bracket; some names have slight variation on TBT website pages.

== Tournament bracket ==
Six of the eight no. 1 seeds advanced in first-round play, with no. 7 Takeover BC upsetting Red Rose Thunder in the Cincinnati Regional.

Three no. 1 seeds advanced in second-round play; the lowest seed to advance to the third round was no 8. Team DRC from the Louisville Regional.

No no. 1 seeds advanced in third-round play; the lowest seed to advance to the quarterfinals was again Takeover BC.

The lowest seed to advance to the semifinals was no 6. Eberlein Drive from the Butler Regional.

In the first semifinal game, Eberlein Driver were eliminated by Forever Coogs, the no. 2 seed from the Houston Regional.

In the second semifinal game, La Familia were eliminated by Carmen's Crew, the no. 3 seed from the Dayton Regional.

Carmen's Crew then defeated Forever Coogs in the championship game.

=== Butler Regional – Hinkle Fieldhouse ===
First Round; July 19
1	Assembly Ball	89
8	The Cru	78
4	Men of Mackey	75
5	Fort Wayne Champs	63
3	Team Arkansas	76
6	Eberlein Drive	79
2	All Good Dawgs	90
7	Fail Harder	67

Second Round; July 21
1	Assembly Ball	68
4	Men of Mackey	55
6	Eberlein Drive	88
2	All Good Dawgs	73

Third Round; July 23
1	Assembly Ball	79
6	Eberlein Drive	82

=== Pittsburgh Regional – Petersen Events Center ===
First Round; July 20
1	Star of Storrs	85
8	Herkimer Originals	52
4	Dubois Dream	77
5	Happy Valley Hoopers	88
3	Best Virginia	94
6	Brotherly Love Pro Am Foundation	69
2	Zoo Crew	98
7	Million $ Worth of Game	95

Second Round; July 22
1	Stars of Storrs	83
5	Happy Valley Hoopers	94
3	Best Virginia	79
2	Zoo Crew	91

Third Round; July 24
5	Happy Valley Hoopers	85
2	Zoo Crew	82

=== Houston Regional – Fertitta Center ===
First Round; July 19
1	Bleed Green	78
8	LA Ignite	63
4	The Program NYC for Autism	67
5	Team Challenge ALS	69
3	The Enchantment	53
6	Once a Bronco	60
2	Forever Coogs	71
7	Austin's Own	60

Second Round; July 21
1	Bleed Green	63
5	Team Challenge ALS	66
6	Once a Bronco	76
2	Forever Coogs	79

Third Round; July 23
5	Team Challenge ALS	70
2	Forever Coogs	75

=== Wichita Regional – Charles Koch Arena ===
First Round; July 20
1	AfterShocks	86
8	Midtown Prestige	71
4	Purple Reign	67
5	Team Colorado	71
3	Florida TNT	81
6	L.A. Cheaters	61
2	Mass Street	81
7	Ram Up	68

Second Round; July 22
1	AfterShocks	74
5	Team Colorado	79
3	Florida TNT	59
2	Mass Street	76

Third Round; July 24
5	Team Colorado	84
2	Mass Street	81

=== Cincinnati Regional – Fifth Third Arena ===
First Round; July 19
1	Nasty Nati	66
8	Team Aboutbillions	70
4	Brown Ballers	54
5	Red Rose Thunder	83
3	Team Gibson	67
6	Dream 34	76
2	Zip 'Em Up	75
7	Takeover BC	91

Second Round; July 21
8	Team Aboutbillions	65
5	Red Rose Thunder	87
6	Dream 34	85
7	Takeover BC	88

Third Round; July 23
5	Red Rose Thunder	63
7	Takeover BC	88

=== Dayton Regional – UD Arena ===
First Round; July 20
1	Heartfire	68
8	Rise and Grind	64
4	We Are D3	88
5	Sweet Home Alabama	72
3	Carmen's Crew	93
6	Purple Hearts	58
2	Red Scare	88
7	Daguys STL	74

Second Round; July 22
1	Heartfire	70
4	We Are D3	68
3	Carmen's Crew	71
2	Red Scare	60

Third Round; July 24
1	Heartfire	70
3	Carmen's Crew	74

=== Lexington Regional – Rupp Arena ===
First Round; July 19
1	Herd That	92
8	Jackson TN Boom	57
4	War Ready	80
5	D2 Waymakers	73
3	Woco Showtime	76
6	The Nawf	87
2	La Familia	82
7	305 Ballers	56

Second Round; July 21
1	Herd That	63
4	War Ready	59
6	The Nawf	64
2	La Familia	81

Third Round; July 23
1	Herd That	66
2	La Familia	95

=== Louisville Regional – Freedom Hall ===
First Round; July 20
1	Team Diesel	79
8	Team DRC	85
4	Run DFW	75
5	Team Fredette	77
3	Sideline Cancer	100
6	VBL Winner	77
2	The Ville	79
7	UKnighted	70

Second Round; July 22
8	Team DRC	79
5	Team Fredette	74
3	Sideline Cancer	69
2	The Ville	71

Third Round; July 24
8	Team DRC	68
2	The Ville	83

=== Championship Week ===
Quarterfinals games were played at Houston and Louisville. All semifinal and championship games were played in Philadelphia.

Quarterfinals; July 29–30
BT 6	Eberlein Drive	85
PB 5	Happy Valley Hoopers	71
HO 2	Forever Coogs	74
WI 5	Team Colorado	49
CI 7	Takeover BC	74
DY 3	Carmen's Crew	90
LX 2	La Familia	70
LV 2	The Ville	61

Semifinals; August 2
BT 6	Eberlein Drive	73
HO 2	Forever Coogs	76
DY 3	Carmen's Crew	76
LX 2	La Familia	70

Championship; August 4
HO 2	Forever Coogs	65
DY 3	Carmen's Crew	69

Eric Collins, Nick Bahe, and Cayleigh Griffin were the announcers for both semifinal matches and the championship game.

==== Semifinals ====
FS1

August 2, 2024
7:00 p.m. EDT

Stats, Recap

BT 6 Eberlein Drive 73, HO 2 Forever Coogs 76
Scoring by quarter: 17–20, 17–20, 17–19, 22–17
Pts: T. Brown 19; Rebs: T. Stone 9 Asts: A. Clemmons 6	Pts: R. Gray 18; Rebs: J. Gorham 7 Asts: R. Gray 3

Daskalakis Athletic Center
Philadelphia, Pennsylvania
Referees: Jeffrey Anderson, Mike Evans, Jamahl Ralls

FS1

August 2, 2024
9:00 p.m. EDT

Stats, Recap

DY 3 Carmen's Crew 76, LX 2 La Familia 70
Scoring by quarter: 14–10, 26–17, 17–21, 19–22
Pts: J. Sullinger 16; Rebs: J. Sullinger 7 Asts: K. Wesson, K. Woods 4	Pts: K. Kanter 17; Rebs: W. Cauley-Stein 9 Asts: A. Harrison 4

Daskalakis Athletic Center
Philadelphia, Pennsylvania
Referees: Earl Walton, Matt Potter, Danny Basile

==== Championship ====
FOX

August 4, 2024
2:00 p.m. EDT

Stats Recap

DY 3 Carmen's Crew 69, HO 2 Forever Coogs 65
Scoring by quarter: 18–21, 18–13, 19–15, 14–16
Pts: J. Sullinger 18; Rebs: J. Sullinger 8 Asts: D. Bradford 3	Pts: R. Gray 10; Rebs: J. Gorham 8 Asts: J. Gorham 6

Daskalakis Athletic Center
Philadelphia, Pennsylvania
Referees: Jeff Anderson, Earl Walton, Matt Potter

== Awards ==
All Tournament Team
Pos	Player	Team
PG	Rob Gray	Forever Coogs
PG	Kerem Kanter	La Familia
SG	Sam Sessoms	Happy Valley Hoopers
PG	Tyler Stone	Eberlein Drive
PF	Jared Sullinger	Carmen's Crew
Coach	Jordan Surenkamp	Eberlein Drive
GM	Twany Beckham	La Familia
