= Happy Valley Hoopers =

Professional basketball team

- Leagues: The Basketball Tournament
- Founded: 2023
- Team colors: Blue and white
- General manager: Vincent Melchiorre
- Head coach: Ross Condon
- Website: Team page

Happy Valley Hoopers are an American basketball team that participates in The Basketball Tournament (TBT), an annual winner-take-all single-elimination tournament. The team's roster consists of professional basketball players who compete outside of the NBA, most of whom played college basketball for the Penn State men's basketball team.

== History ==
=== 2024 ===
Date	Round	Location	Score	Opponent
July 20	First round	Pittsburgh, Pennsylvania	88–77	DuBois Dream
July 22	Second round	Pittsburgh, Pennsylvania	94–83	Stars of Storrs
July 24	Third round	Pittsburgh, Pennsylvania	85–82	Zoo Crew
July 29	Quarterfinal	Philadelphia, Pennsylvania	71–85	Eberlein Drive

=== 2025 ===
Date	Round	Location	Score	Opponent
July 18	First round	Harrisonburg, Virginia	75–79	Raleigh 919 Legends

== Awards ==
Year	Player	Award	Ref.
2024	Sam Sessoms	All-Tournament	
