= Todd O'Brien =

American basketball player (born 1989)

Free agent
- Position: Center

Personal information
- Born: March 3, 1989 (age 37) Media, Pennsylvania
- Listed height: 6 ft 11 in (2.11 m)
- Listed weight: 248 lb (112 kg)

Career information
- High school: Garden Spot (New Holland, Pennsylvania)
- College: Bucknell (2007–2008); Saint Joseph's (2009–2011)
- NBA draft: 2012: undrafted
- Playing career: 2012–present

Career history
- 2012–2013: BK Jēkabpils
- 2013–2014: Hermine Nantes
- 2014–2015: Oita Heat Devils
- 2015: MKS Dąbrowa Górnicza
- 2015–2016: Al Arabi
- 2016: CS Sagesse
- 2016: Urartu
- 2016–2017: CS Sagesse
- 2017: BK Ventspils
- 2018–2019: Al Ahly
- 2019: Alexandria Sporting Club
- 2022: IHC Apes

Todd O'Brien (born March 3, 1989) is an American-born, naturalized Armenian professional basketball player who last played for Alexandria Sporting Club of the Egyptian National League. He played college basketball for Bucknell and Saint Joseph's before playing professionally in Latvia, France, Japan, Poland, Qatar, Lebanon, Armenia, Egypt and Israel.

== High school ==
O'Brien attended Garden Spot High School in New Holland, Pennsylvania (2003–2007). A 4-year starter, he finished his high school basketball career with over 1,000 points, 700 rebounds, and 250 blocked shots. As a senior, he averaged over 15 points, 10 rebounds and five blocks per game for the Spartans.

As a 3-star recruit O’Brien was ranked as the No. 12 Pennsylvania prospect of 2007 by PA Prep report. O’Brien was selected First Team Lancaster-Lebanon (L-L) Section Two his sophomore, junior and senior years and First Team All-L-L League as a senior. He was named a Top 20 All-Star at Eastern Invitational Camp before his senior season, and also was selected to play in the Philadelphia-Washington D.C. All-Star Game and the Jameer Nelson All-Star Classic.

O'Brien was the first basketball player in Garden Spot's history to earn an NCAA Division I basketball scholarship, accepting a full scholarship from Bucknell University.

== College career ==
As a freshman at Bucknell, O’Brien was named to the Patriot League All-Rookie team, finishing third in the league in blocks. At the end of the season, O'Brien transferred to Saint Joseph's University in Philadelphia. After redshirting the 2008–2009 season, O'Brien started at center for the Hawks and was the team's leading rebounder in the 2010–2011 season. He earned the George Senesky Award for academic excellence in his 2009–2010 season.

After playing a decreased role for the Hawks in the 2010–2011 season, O'Brien opted to become a Graduate Transfer and play his final eligible season of college basketball at the University of Alabama Birmingham. Complications getting his transfer waiver approved ultimately left O'Brien as a member of the Blazers basketball team but unable to compete in NCAA games for the 2011–2012 season. The waiver dispute earned O’Brien public support from ESPN, Sports Illustrated, and the New York Times.

== Professional career ==
In June 2012, O'Brien signed his first professional contract with BK Jekabpils of the Latvian Basketball League. In their inaugural season, O'Brien helped lead the team to a No. 5 finish and secure a spot in the playoffs. O’Brien finished top five in the league in points (15.6), rebounds (9.4), and player efficiency per game. He was named Latvian League Center of the Year, First Team All Latvia and to the Latvian League All Imports Team by Eurobasket.com

For his second season, O'Brien signed with Hermine Nantes in Nantes, France. Playing in the LNB Pro B division, O'Brien was sidelined from October to December with a foot injury. He was able to return and finish the rest of the season, averaging 10.5 points per game and 5.8 rebounds per game.

In July 2014, O'Brien signed with the Oita Heat Devils of the Japanese BJ League. Playing in 50 games that season, O’Brien finished as the team leader in points (13.0), rebounds (9.4), field goal percentage (50%), blocks (1.2), and player efficiency (14.7). He helped guide the Heat Devils to a playoff appearance as the No. 7 seed in the Western Conference.

In July 2015, O'Brien signed with Polish club MKS Dąbrowa Górnicza. O'Brien left the club in October and moved to Al Arabi of the Qatar Basketball League. While playing for Al Arabi, O'Brien led the team in points (22.3), rebounds (17.9), field goal percentage (47.8), free throw percentage (78.4), blocks (1.4), and player efficiency (31.4). He ranked first in the league in rebounds and player efficiency, third in blocked shots and ninth in scoring. O’Brien was named Qatar Center of the Year, First Team All-Qatar and to the Qatar All-Imports team.

Upon the conclusion of the Qatar Basketball league regular season, O'Brien signed with Lebanese club CS Sagesse Beirut of the Lebanese Basketball League in March 2016. In 13 games, O'Brien emerged as the league's leading rebounder at 13.2 per game and finished in the top five in player efficiency. Entering playoffs as a No. 7 seed, O'Brien hit the game-winning shot at the end of regulation to complete the series upset over No. 2 seed Tadamon Zouk to send Sagesse into the league's final four round.

O'Brien joined Al Hala of the Bahrain Premier League for the preseason Bahrain Supercup. Upon completion in mid-September, O'Brien signed with Urartu BC of Armenia in their inaugural season. O'Brien was given an Armenian passport for contributions to the country's national athletics, making him eligible to play for the National Team in future competitions. He participated in the Russian Superleague, where he led the league in rebounding (10.4 rpg) and ranked No. 4 in player efficiency (18.8). Due to sponsorship issues, the club ceased operations in early December.

In December 2016, O'Brien returned to CS Sagesse Beirut on a short-term contract, playing in six Lebanese league games and participating in the Dubai International Tournament in February 2017. In March 2017, O'Brien signed a deal returning to Latvia with league power BK Ventspils.

On November 21, 2018, O'Brien signed with Al Ahly of the Egyptian Basketball Super League. He also participated in the Africa Basketball League, where he led the tournament in rebounds with 12 per game, to go with 13.8 points, 2.8 assists, 1.0 steals and 1.0 block shots per game.

On September 16, 2019, O'Brien signed a one-year deal with Alexandria Sporting Club of Egypt of the Egyptian National League.

== Overseas Elite ==
O'Brien plays as a member of the Overseas Elite basketball team that competes in The Basketball Tournament (TBT), a summer tournament broadcast on ESPN. In 2015, O'Brien was a member of the inaugural Overseas Elite basketball team that competed in TBT 2015. The team, composed of other overseas professionals, went on to defeat Team 23 in the championship game, taking home a $1 million prize.

In summer 2016, O'Brien and Overseas Elite repeated as champions, defeating Team Colorado in the TBT 2016 finals, winning an increased $2 million prize. O'Brien and Overseas Elite won their third championship at TBT 2017, defeating Team Challenge ALS in the finals, for another $2 million prize. At TBT 2018, O'Brien and Overseas Elite won their fourth championship, defeating Eberlein Drive in the finals, to secure another $2 million prize.

== Personal life ==
O'Brien was born March 3, 1989, in Media, Pennsylvania. His family moved to Lancaster, Pennsylvania, when he was young. His father, Roy, played football at the University of Penn and was an assistant football coach at Widener University. His mother, Pam, played both lacrosse and basketball at Hood College. His older sister, Kim, was a triple jumper at Muhlenberg College. His younger sister, Julia, plays professional volleyball. She was a two-time All-PSAC First Team selection at West Chester University and the 2014 PSAC Player of the Year. His uncle, Bruce Frank, played basketball at the University of Penn and went on to play professionally in Germany. His cousin, Matt Frank, was the starting right guard and team captain of James Madison University's 2016 National Championship football team.
