= Johndre Jefferson =

Central African basketball player

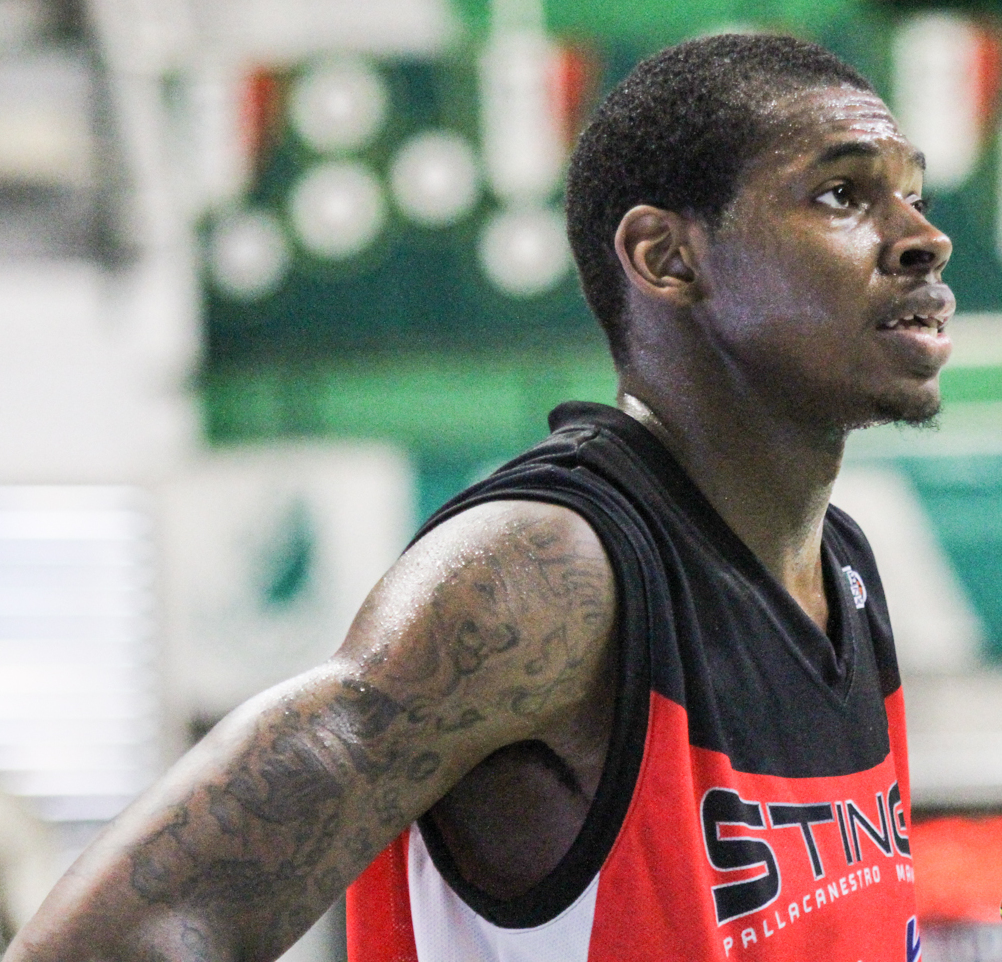
- Jefferson with Mantova in 2013-14 season

Free agent
- Position: Center

Personal information
- Born: November 30, 1988 (age 37) Santee, South Carolina
- Listed height: 6 ft 10 in (2.08 m)
- Listed weight: 230 lb (104 kg)

Career information
- High school: Lake Marion (Santee, South Carolina)
- College: Northwest Florida State (2007–2009); South Carolina (2009–2011)
- NBA draft: 2011: undrafted
- Playing career: 2011–present

Career history
- 2011–2012: Iskra Svit
- 2012: Maccabi Kiryat Gat
- 2012–2013: Elitzur Ramla
- 2013–2015: Mantovana
- 2015: Varese
- 2015–2016: Konyaspor
- 2016–2017: Aquila Trento
- 2017: Afyon
- 2017–2018: Champville
- 2018: Cibona
- 2019: PAOK Thessaloniki
- 2019–2020: Chorale Roanne
- 2021: AS Salé
- 2021–2022: Nacional
- 2022–2023: Peñarol Mar del Plata

Johndre Jefferson (born November 30, 1988) is an American and Central African professional basketball player who last played for Peñarol Mar del Plata of the Liga Nacional de Básquet (LNB). He played college basketball for Northwest Florida State and South Carolina. Born in the United States, he represents Central African Republic internationally.

== Early life and college career ==
Jefferson attended Lake Marion High School & Technology Center in Santee, South Carolina, where he averaged 16.0 points, 9.0 rebounds and 3.2 blocks during his senior season. Jefferson was named the male athlete of the year and garnered all-region and all-state accolades.

Jefferson played college basketball for Northwest Florida State College's Raiders, where he averaged 9.2 points, 9.5 rebounds and 3.7 blocks during 2008–09 campaign.

In 2009, Jefferson was transferred from Northwest Florida State College to the University of South Carolina, where he averaged 1.7 points, 1.7 assists and 0.9 blocks in 9 minutes per game in his senior year. Jefferson led the team or shared the team lead in blocks five times.

== Professional career ==
After finishing his college basketball career at South Carolina, Jefferson was not drafted by any NBA team. He signed for the 2011–12 season with the Iskra Svit in Slovakia.

On August 29, 2013, he signed a one-year deal with Italian club Pallacanestro Mantovana of the Serie A2 Basket. On July 23, 2014, he re-signed with Mantovana for one more season. On February 4, 2015, he was suspended by Mantovana. Six days later, he left the club and signed with Pallacanestro Varese for the rest of the 2014–15 Serie A season.

On July 11, 2015, he signed with Turkish club Torku Konyaspor for the 2015–16 season.

On July 21, 2016, Jefferson signed with Italian club Aquila Basket Trento. On January 6, 2017, he parted ways with Trento after averaging 10.5 points and 7.2 rebounds in eleven games. On February 25, 2017, he signed with Turkish club Afyonkarahisar Belediyespor for the rest of the season.

On July 30, 2017, Jefferson signed with Champville of the Lebanese Basketball League.

On October 1, 2018, Jefferson signed a one-year deal with Cibona of the ABA League and the Croatian League. Cibona parted ways with him on December 24, 2018. Jefferson spent the rest of the 2018–2019 season with PAOK Thessaloniki in Greece.

On August 16, 2019, he has signed with Chorale Roanne Basket of the LNB Pro A.

In May 2021, Jefferson was on the roster of Moroccan club AS Salé for the 2021 BAL season.

== The Basketball Tournament ==
Jefferson has competed for Overseas Elite in The Basketball Tournament (TBT), a single-elimination winner-take-all tournament. In TBT 2015, he was a center for Overseas Elite as they won the $1 million prize. He also competed for Overseas Elite in TBT 2016 and TBT 2017, where they successfully defended their title and won $2 million each year. In TBT 2018, Jefferson played six games, averaging 4.2 points per game and 3.0 rebounds per game on 75% shooting. Overseas Elite again reached the championship game and defeated Eberlein Drive, 70–58, for their fourth consecutive TBT title and another $2 million prize. In TBT 2019, Jefferson and Overseas Elite advanced to the semifinals where they suffered their first-ever defeat, losing to Carmen's Crew, 71–66.

== BAL career statistics ==
Legend
GP	Games played	GS	Games started	MPG	Minutes per game
FG%	Field goal percentage	3P%	3-point field goal percentage	FT%	Free throw percentage
RPG	Rebounds per game	APG	Assists per game	SPG	Steals per game
BPG	Blocks per game	PPG	Points per game	**Bold**	Career high

Year	Team	GP	GS	MPG	FG%	3P%	FT%	RPG	APG	SPG	BPG	PPG
2021	AS Salé	4	2	18.2	.214	–	.429	4.3	.5	.5	1.8	2.3
Career		4	2	18.2	.214	–	.429	4.3	.5	.5	1.8	2.3
