= Heartfire (TBT) =

- Leagues: The Basketball Tournament
- Founded: 2015
- History: Team 23 (2015–2019, 2021); Heartfire (2022–present)
- Location: Phoenix, Arizona
- Team colors: Crimson, Black, and Grey
- Main sponsor: Choreo Advisors
- General manager: Homer Drew
- Head coach: LaPhonso Ellis
- Championships: 1 (2023)
- Website: Team page

Heartfire (formerly known as Team 23) is an American basketball team that competes in The Basketball Tournament (TBT), an annual winner-take-all competition. The team has competed in each tournament since 2015, except for 2020. The team is composed of players from Arizona. As of 2025, the team's general manager is Valparaiso alumnus Homer Drew, and the head coach is LaPhonso Ellis.

== History ==
The team was originally named after Michael Jordan's primary uniform number during his professional career—Team 23's general manager Michael Illiano wrote that his "basketball passion started with MJ".

=== 2015 ===
After being accepted into TBT 2015 with 165 registered fans, Team 23 opened its tournament run by defeating the West Coast Ronin, 91–67. The team notched another win in the second round, against Richard Roby and Team Colorado, behind 28 points from Davin White, by a score of 78–72. White was effective once more as Team 23 bested Team B-Ball Breakdown in the following game, 86–72, pushing them to the Super 17 round in Chicago.

At the Super 17, Team 23 defeated 7outz, 105–64, in their first game, allowing only two of their opponents' players to score over 10 points. Team 23 made the semifinal round of the tournament after they won their fifth straight game by double figures. The losing team, LA Unified, missed one of their players, Ekene Ibekwe, and allowed Team 23 to score 11 straight points to begin the second half, en route to a 77–56 win.

Team 23 entered the semifinals as the most efficient team of the tournament. In New York City on August 1, they defeated Ants Alumni, 87–76, to advance to the championship game. In the finals on August 2, Team 23 narrowly fell to Overseas Elite, 67–65.

==== Games ====
Date	Round	Location	Score	Opponent		Ref.
Date	Round	Location	Score	Team	Seed	Ref.
July 10	Regional	Los Angeles, CA	91–67	West Coast Ronin	West No. 19	
July 11	Regional	Los Angeles, CA	78–72	Team Colorado	West No. 4	
July 12	Regional	Los Angeles, CA	86–72	Team B-Ball Breakdown	West No. 11	
July 17	Super 17	Chicago, IL	105–64	7outz	West No. 9	
July 23	Quarterfinals	Chicago, IL	77–56	LA Unified	West No. 2	
August 1	Semifinals	New York, NY	87–76	Ants Alumni	Midwest No. 2	
August 2	Finals	New York, NY	65–67	Overseas Elite	South No. 3	

==== Roster ====
- Zach Andrews
- Travis Gabbidon
- Andrew Kelly
- Augustine Okosun
- Larry Owens
- Dwight Pederson
- Gabriel Sandoval
- Alex Scales
- Marcus Wells
- Davin White

=== 2016–2019 ===
In TBT 2016, Team 23 was the top seed in the West Region, played in Los Angeles. After winning their first two games, they fell to Team Colorado, the eventual tournament runner-up, by a score of 78–73.

==== Games ====
Date	Round	Location	Score	Opponent		Ref.
Date	Round	Location	Score	Team	Seed	Ref.
July 9	Regional	Los Angeles, CA	121–81	Kimchi Express	West No.	
July 10	Regional	Los Angeles, CA	101–88	New Mexico RH	West No.	
July 11	Regional	Los Angeles, CA	73–78	Team Colorado	West No. 5	

In TBT 2017, Team 23 was the fifth seed in the West Region, played in Las Vegas. They defeated 12th-seeded Pedro's Posse, 107–92, then lost to fourth-seeded Armored Athlete, 84–77.

==== Games ====
Date	Round	Location	Score	Opponent		Ref.
Date	Round	Location	Score	Team	Seed	Ref.
July 8	Regional	Las Vegas, NV	107–92	Pedro's Posse	West No. 12	
July 9	Regional	Las Vegas, NV	77–84	Armored Athlete	West No. 4	

In TBT 2018, Team 23 was the eighth seed in the West Region, played in Los Angeles. They lost in the first round to the ninth-seeded CitiTeam Blazers, 82–71.

==== Games ====
Date	Round	Location	Score	Opponent		Ref.
Date	Round	Location	Score	Team	Seed	Ref.
July 14	Regional	Los Angeles, CA	71–82	CitiTeam Blazers	West No. 9	

==== Roster ====
- Augustine Okosun
- Charlie Westbrook
- Dermaine Crockrell
- Larry Owens
- Davin White
- David Bell
- Gabe Freeman
- Brandon Wood
- Anthony Stover
- Andrew Kelly

In TBT 2019, Team 23 was the sixth seed in the Greensboro Regional. They lost in the first round to third-seeded Power of the Paw (Clemson alumni), 82–78.

==== Games ====
Date	Round	Location	Score	Opponent		Ref.
Date	Round	Location	Score	Team	Seed	Ref.
July 19	Regional	Los Angeles, CA	78–82	Power of the Paw	Greensboro No. 3	

The team did not compete in the reduced-size (24 teams) TBT 2020.

=== 2021 ===
In TBT 2021, Team 23 was seeded sixth in the West Virginia Regional. They defeated Georgia Kingz in the first round, 91–64, Herd That in the second round, 74–71, and second-seeded Best Virginia in the regional semifinals, 75–67.

Team 23 next faced top-seeded Sideline Cancer in the regional final, registering a 78–71 win. Team 23 then met Blue Collar U—who advanced from the Columbus Regional—in a tournament semifinal game on August 1; Team 23 won, 78–62.

Team 23 met Boeheim's Army—who advanced from the Illinois Regional—in the championship game on August 78th; the game was won by Boeheim's Army, 69–67.

==== Games ====
Date	Round	Location	Score	Opponent		Ref.
Date	Round	Location	Score	Team	Seed	Ref.
July 17	First round	Charleston, WV	91–64	Georgia Kingz	West Virginia No. 11	
July 19	Second round	Charleston, WV	74–71	Herd That	West Virginia No. 3	
July 21	Regional semifinals	Charleston, WV	75–67	Best Virginia	West Virginia No. 2	
July 31	Regional finals	Dayton, OH	78–71	Sideline Cancer	West Virginia No. 1	
August 1	Semifinals	Dayton, OH	78–62	Blue Collar U	Ohio No. 6	
August 3	Championship	Dayton, OH	67–69	Boeheim's Army	Illinois No. 3	

==== Roster ====
- Daniel Ochefu
- Marcus Hall
- Victor Nickerson
- Charles Mitchell
- Ashaun Dixon-Tatum
- Dakarai Tucker
- Craig Sword
- Michale Kyser
- Walter Lemon Jr.
- Terrell Smith
- Eric Washington

=== 2022 ===
In TBT 2022, The newly branded Heartfire was the first seed in the New Mexico regional. In the first round, they played Competitive Choice and won 84-75. In the 2nd round they played The Enchantment, (New Mexico alumni team) and won 79-74. In the third round, they played the LA Cheaters from the Drew League and won 86-72. In the fourth round, they played Blue Collar U (Buffalo alumni team) and lost 74-66

==== Games ====
Date	Round	Location	Score	Opponent		Ref.
Date	Round	Location	Score	Team	Seed	Ref.
July 18	First round	Albuquerque, NM	84–75	Competitive Choice	New Mexico No. 8	
July 19	Second round	Albuquerque, NM	79–74	The Enchantment	New Mexico No. 4	
July 21	Third round	Albuquerque, NM	86–72	LA Cheaters	New Mexico No. 3	
July 29	Quarterfinals	Dayton, OH	66–74	Blue Collar U	Syracuse No. 2	

=== 2023 ===
TBT 2023, Heartfire was the second seed in the Witchita 1 regional. In their first matchup they played Juco Products, (junior college alumni) and won 69-66. In their second matchup they played the LA Cheaters, (from the Drew league) and won 62-57. In their third matchup they played Mass Street, (Kansas alumni) and won 73-60. In their fourth matchup they played the Aftershocks, (Wichita State alumni) and won 76-53. In the semi-finals they played Herd That, (Marshall alumni) and won 73-68. In the Championship, they played Bleed Green, (North Texas alumni) and won 78-73.

==== Games ====
Date	Round	Location	Score	Opponent		Ref.
Date	Round	Location	Score	Team	Seed	Ref.
July 19	First round	Wichita, KS	69–66	JUCO Products	Wichita 1 No. 7	
July 22	Second round	Wichita, KS	62–57	LA Cheaters	Wichita 1 No. 3	
July 23	Third round	Wichita, KS	73–60	Mass Street	Wichita 1 No. 1	
July 25	Quarterfinals	Wichita, KS	76–53	Aftershocks	Wichita 2 No. 1	
August 2	Semifinals	Philadelphia, PA	73–68	Herd That	West Virginia No. 4	
August 3	Championship	Philadelphia, PA	78–73	Bleed Green	Lubbock No. 2	

==== Roster ====
- Eric Griffin
- Larry Owens
- Tevin Mack
- Marcus Hall
- Davin White
- Richard Solomon
- Raphiael Putney
- Craig Sword
- Walter Ellis
- Justin Tuoyo
- TreVion Crews
- John Gillon

=== 2024 ===
==== Games ====
Date	Round	Location	Score	Opponent		Ref.
Date	Round	Location	Score	Team	Seed	Ref.
July 20	First round	Dayton, OH	68–64	Rise and Grind	Dayton No. 8	
July 22	Second round	Dayton, OH	70–68	We Are D3	Dayton No. 4	
July 24	Third round	Dayton, OH	70–74	Carmen's Crew	Dayton No. 3	

==== Roster ====
- Tevin Mack
- Marcus Hall
- Jordan Bell
- Richard Solomon
- Larry Owens
- Craig Sword
- Raphiael Putney
- Bryan Griffin
- D. J. Kennedy
- Eric Washington
- Davin White
- Walter Ellis

=== 2025 ===
==== Games ====
Date	Round	Location	Score	Opponent		Ref.
Date	Round	Location	Score	Team	Seed	Ref.
July 20	Second round	Kansas City, MO	89-70	Sheffield Sharks	Kansas City No. 4	
July 22	Third round (Kansas City Regional Championship)	Kansas City, MO	71–68	JHX Hoops	Kansas City No. 2	
July 27	Quarterfinals	Wichita, KS	68–74	Aftershocks	Wichita No. 2	

==== Roster ====
- Bryan Griffin
- Craig Sword
- D. J. Kennedy
- Eric Griffin
- Eric Washington
- Jordan Stevens
- Larry Owens
- Marcus Hall
- Raphiael Putney
- Tevin Mack
- Walter Ellis

== Record by years ==
Year	Seed	Won	Lost	Notes
2015	13th West	6	1	lost in final to Overseas Elite
2016	1st West	2	1	lost to Team Colorado
2017	5th West	1	1	lost to Armored Athlete
2018	8th West	0	1	lost to CitiTeam Blazers
2019	6th Greensboro	0	1	lost to Power of the Paw
2020	—	0	0	did not enter
2021	6th West Virginia	5	1	lost in final to Boeheim's Army
2022	1st New Mexico	3	1	lost in quarterfinals to Blue Collar U
2023	2nd Wichita 1	6	0	won in final over Bleed Green
2024	1st Dayton	2	1	lost in third round to Carmen's Crew
2025	1st Kansas City	2	1	lost in quarterfinals to Aftershocks
Total		25	8	

== Awards ==
All-Tournament teams have been named since 2016; MVPs since 2014.

Year	Player	Award	Ref.
2021	Raphiael Putney	All-Tournament	
2021	Marc Hughes	All-Tournament (Coach)	

== Logo and uniforms ==
Logo, 2015–2021

Uniforms, 2015–2021

== Roster ==
2025 Heartfire roster
Players
Coaches

Pos.	No.	Nat.	Name	Ht.	Wt.	Age
F	0	(United States)	Mack, Tevin	6 ft 7 in (2.01 m)		28 – 1 May 1997
G	1	(United States)	Hall, Marcus	6 ft 1 in (1.85 m)		40 – 6 August 1985
F	15	(United States)	Owens, Larry	6 ft 7 in (2.01 m)		43 – 8 January 1983
F	17	(United States)	Griffin, Eric	6 ft 9 in (2.06 m)		35 – 26 May 1990
SG	22	(United States)	Sword, Craig	6 ft 3 in (1.91 m)		32 – 16 January 1994
G	23	(United States)	Stevens, Jordan	6 ft 1 in (1.85 m)
F/C	24	(United States)	Putney, Raphiael	6 ft 10 in (2.08 m)		35 – 21 April 1990
C	25	(South Korea) (United States)	Griffin, Bryan	6 ft 8 in (2.03 m)		27 – 30 April 1998
F	31	(United States)	Kennedy, D. J.	6 ft 6 in (1.98 m)		36 – 5 November 1989
PG	33	(Malta) (United States)	Washington, Eric	6 ft 0 in (1.83 m)		32 – 23 June 1993
PG	34	(United States)	White, Davin	6 ft 1 in (1.85 m)		44 – 31 December 1981
G	55	(United States)	Ellis, Walter	6 ft 5 in (1.96 m)		26 – 29 November 1999

Head coach

LaPhonso Ellis

Assistant coach(es)

- David Rocha
- Ron Katich
- Stephen Dyer

Legend

- (C) Team captain
- Injured

- Roster
Updated: July 20, 2025
