= Overseas Elite =

Basketball team

- Leagues: The Basketball Tournament
- Founded: 2015
- History: Overseas Elite (2015–2020)
- Team colors: Blue, black, and gray
- General manager: Matt Morrison
- Head coach: Marc Hughes (Raptors 905)
- Assistant: Paris Horne
- Championships: 4 TBT (2015, 2016, 2017, 2018)
- Website: Team page
| Home | Away |

Overseas Elite was an American basketball team that participated in The Basketball Tournament (TBT), an annual winner-take-all single-elimination tournament. The team won the tournament four consecutive times: 2015 (prize money $1 million), 2016 ($2 million), 2017 ($2 million), and 2018 ($2 million). The roster of Overseas Elite consisted of professional basketball players who competed outside of the NBA. The team last competed in 2020.

== History ==
The team's name is a reference to their players being "a collection of stars who play hoops at basketball outposts around the world".

=== 2015: First championship ===
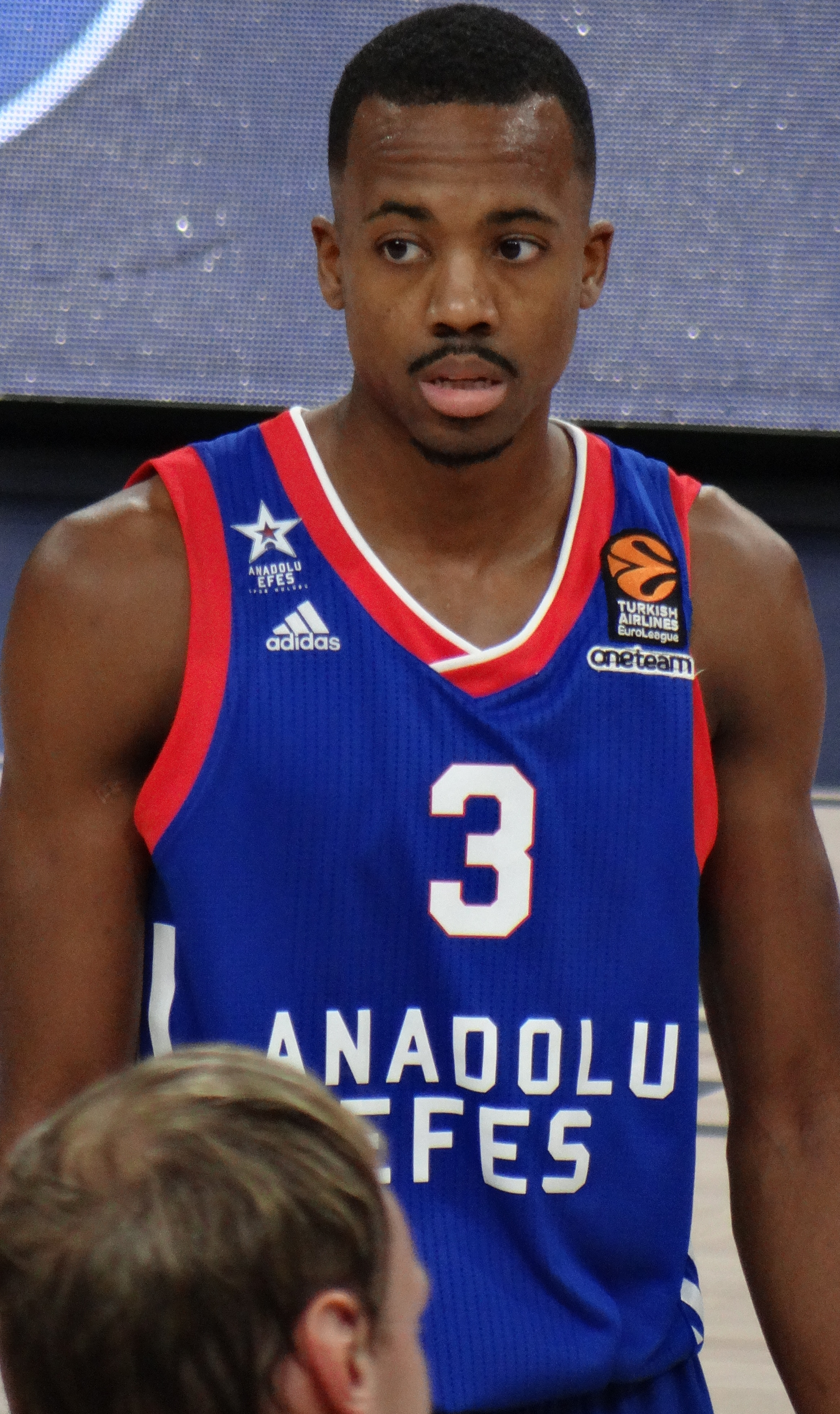
Errick McCollum played on all four championship teams.

Overseas Elite was accepted as a third-seed in TBT 2015 after amassing 139 registered fans. It was placed in the South region, which had Josh Selby and TeamBDB as the top seeds. Overseas Elite defeated the Underdogs, 89–83, in both teams' debuts. Errick McCollum's double-double, 18 points and 11 rebounds, helped Overseas Elite get past Team Charlotte Elite in the second round, 77–74. McCollum posted 32 points in his team's next contest, against Damien Wilkins and Trained to Go, pushing Overseas Elite to the Super 17 round of the tournament. D. J. Kennedy was instrumental in Overseas Elite's first Super 17 victory, which was vs. Sean Bell All Stars. The team became the first to qualify for the year's semifinals after it beat Dirty South, led by Brandon Robinson. It used only six players throughout the game, and it was the fifth Super 17 game to be decided by fewer than 10 points. On August 1, Overseas Elite defeated Team City of Gods to reach the championship game against Team 23. On August 2, Overseas Elite was crowned champions after winning, 67–65, with Kennedy being named MVP.

==== Games ====
Overseas Elite was the No. 3 seed in the South region.

| Date | Round | Location | Score | Opponent | |
| Date | Round | Location | Score | Team | Seed |
|---|---|---|---|---|---|
| July 10 | Regional | Atlanta | 89–83 | Underdogs | South No. 22 |
| July 11 | Regional | Atlanta | 77–74 | Team Charlotte Elite | South No. 14 |
| July 12 | Regional | Atlanta | 73–68 | Trained To Go | South No. 6 |
| July 24 | Super 17 | Chicago | 76–67 | Sean Bell All Stars | South No. 9 |
| July 25 | Quarterfinals | Chicago | 77–72 | Dirty South | South No. 21 |
| August 1 | Semifinals | The Bronx | 84–71 | Team City of Gods | Northeast No. 3 |
| August 2 | Finals | The Bronx | 67–65 | Team 23 | West No. 13 |

==== Roster ====
- Travis Bader
- Kyle Fogg
- Paris Horne
- Johndre Jefferson
- Myck Kabongo
- D. J. Kennedy
- Shane Lawal
- Errick McCollum
- Todd O'Brien
- Colin Curtin (coach)

=== 2016: Second championship ===
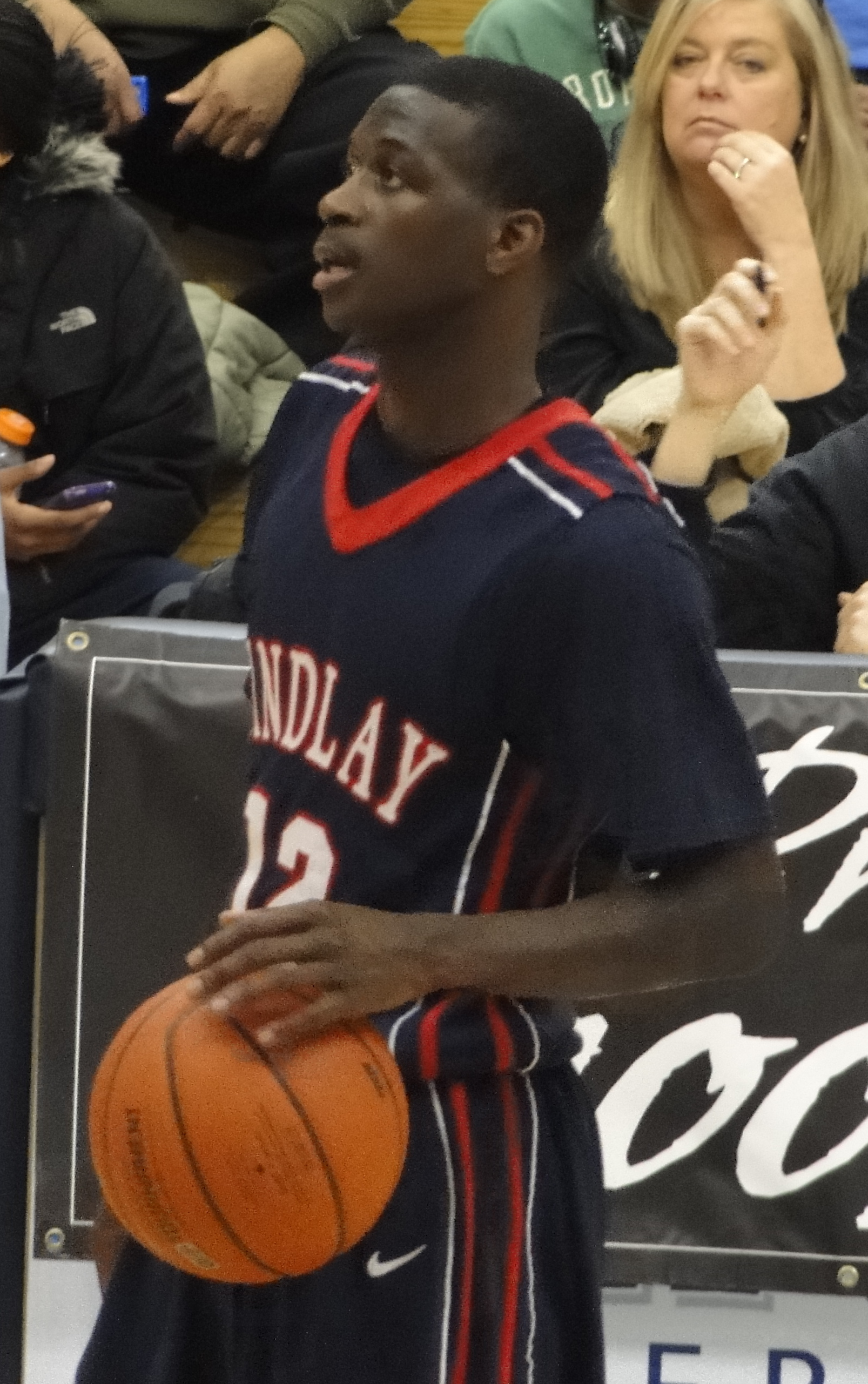
Myck Kabongo played on the 2015 and 2016 teams.

Overseas Elite defended its title in TBT 2016, beating Team Colorado, 77–72, Kyle Fogg was named MVP.

==== Games ====
Overseas Elite was the No. 2 seed in the South region.

| Date | Round | Location | Score | Opponent | |
| Date | Round | Location | Score | Team | Seed |
|---|---|---|---|---|---|
| July 9 | Regional | Charlotte, NC | 97–75 | Showtime | South No. 15 |
| July 10 | Regional | Charlotte, NC | 91–84 | HBC | South No. 7 |
| July 21 | Super 16 | Philadelphia | 91–80 | Ram Nation | South No. 3 |
| July 23 | Quarterfinals | Philadelphia | 74–66 | Trained to Go | South No. 8 |
| July 30 | Semifinals | The Bronx | 103–92 | Team City of Gods | Northeast No. 1 |
| August 2 | Finals | The Bronx | 77–72 | Team Challenge ALS | West No. 5 |

==== Roster ====
- Travis Bader
- Kyle Fogg
- Paris Horne
- Johndre Jefferson
- Myck Kabongo
- DeAndre Kane
- D. J. Kennedy
- Errick McCollum
- Todd O'Brien
- Anthony Raffa
- Ryan Richards
- Colin Curtin (coach)

=== 2017: Third championship ===
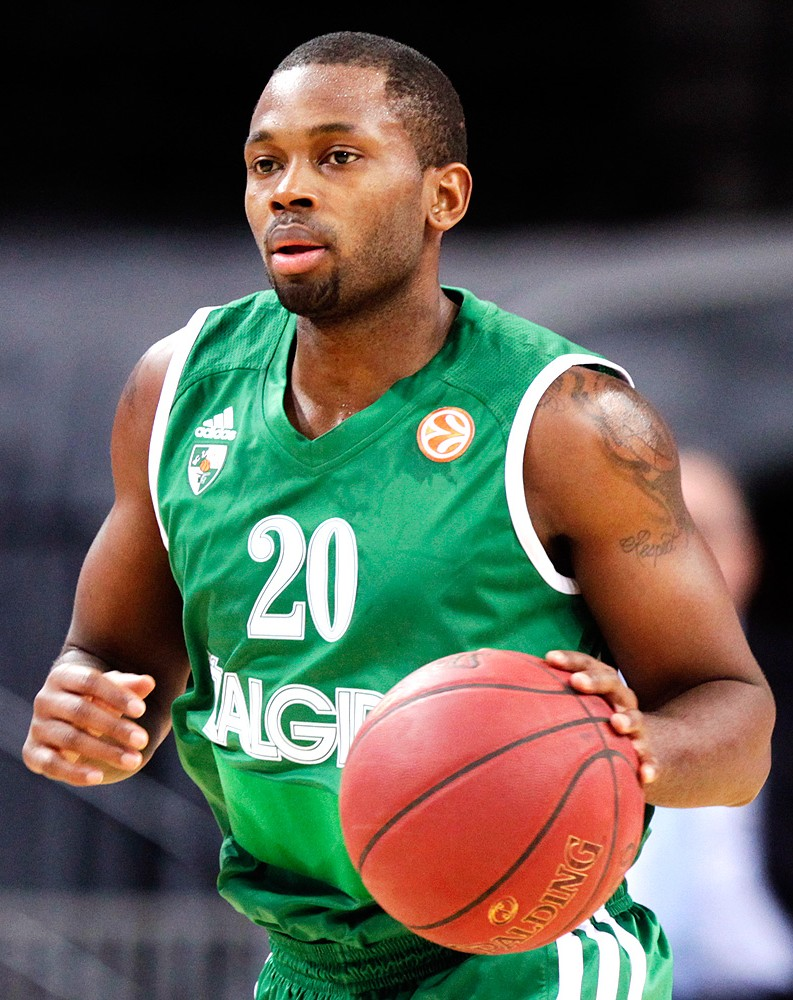
Oliver Lafayette played on the 2017 team.

Overseas Elite won their third title in TBT 2017, defeating Team Challenge ALS, 86–83. Kyle Fogg was again named MVP.

==== Games ====
Overseas Elite was the No. 1 seed in the South region.

| Date | Round | Location | Score | Opponent | |
| Date | Round | Location | Score | Team | Seed |
|---|---|---|---|---|---|
| July 8 | Regional | Charlotte, NC | 84–74 | Chattanooga Trenches | South No. 16 |
| July 9 | Regional | Charlotte, NC | 78–67 | Matadors | South No. 8 |
| July 21 | Super 16 | Brooklyn | 84–76 | Tampa Bulls | South No. 5 |
| July 23 | Quarterfinals | Brooklyn | 86–79 | Ram Nation | South No. 2 |
| August 1 | Semifinals | Baltimore | 81–77 | Boeheim's Army | Northeast No. 3 |
| August 3 | Finals | Baltimore | 86–83 | Team Challenge ALS | West No. 6 |

==== Roster ====
- Travis Bader
- DeJuan Blair
- Justin Burrell
- Kyle Fogg
- Paris Horne
- Johndre Jefferson
- DeAndre Kane
- D. J. Kennedy
- Oliver Lafayette
- Errick McCollum
- Todd O'Brien
- Colin Curtin (coach)

=== 2018: Fourth championship ===
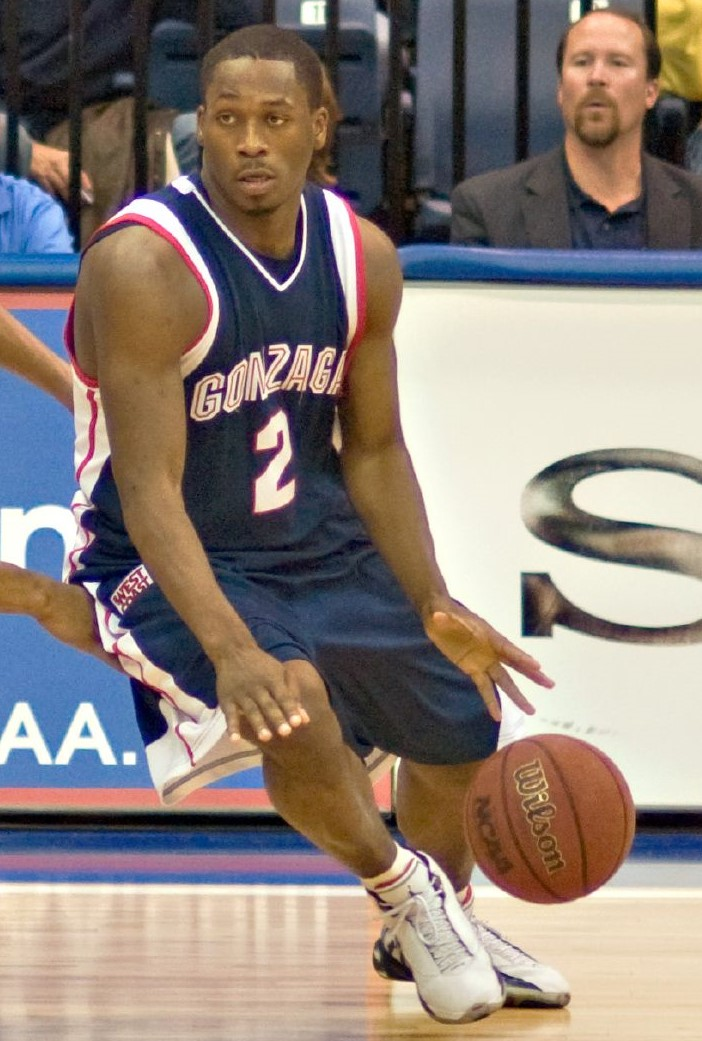
Jeremy Pargo played on the 2018 and 2019 teams.

On August 3, 2018, Overseas Elite won the finals of TBT 2018, defeating Eberlein Drive, 70–58, with D. J. Kennedy being named MVP.

==== Games ====
Overseas Elite was the No. 1 seed in the South region.

| Date | Round | Location | Score | Opponent | | Recap |
| Date | Round | Location | Score | Team | Seed | Recap |
|---|---|---|---|---|---|---|
| July 14 | Regional | Richmond, VA | 78–62 | Team ABC2 | South No. 17 | |
| July 15 | Regional | Richmond, VA | 71–61 | Monarch Nation | South No. 8 | |
| July 26 | Super 16 | Atlanta | 87–86 | Louisiana United | South No. 4 | |
| July 29 | Quarterfinals | Atlanta | 72–60 | Ram Nation | South No. 2 | |
| August 2 | Semifinals | Baltimore | 85–60 | Golden Eagles | Northeast No. 3 | |
| August 3 | Finals | Baltimore | 70–58 | Eberlein Drive | West No. 7 | |

==== Roster ====
- Justin Burrell
- Kyle Fogg
- Paris Horne
- Johndre Jefferson
- DeAndre Kane
- D. J. Kennedy
- Errick McCollum
- Will McDonald
- Todd O'Brien
- Jeremy Pargo
- Marc Hughes (coach)
- L. T. Lockett (asst. coach)

=== 2019: End of reign ===
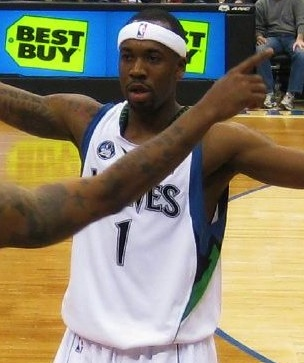
Bobby Brown was a member of the 2019 team.

Errick McCollum, who had played for the team in each of the prior four tournaments, did not play in TBT 2019, due to getting married. Additionally, Kyle Fogg, who was a two-time tournament MVP, was not on the roster. Overseas Elite won their first three games, to capture their region and advance to the quarterfinals in Chicago. In the quarterfinals, they defeated Loyalty Is Love, 86–73. That win advanced Overseas Elite to the semifinals against Carmen's Crew on August 4, where they suffered their first-ever defeat, 71–66.

==== Games ====
Overseas Elite was the top seed in the Richmond Regional.

| Date | Round | Location | Score | Opponent | | Stats |
| Date | Round | Location | Score | Team | Seed | Stats |
|---|---|---|---|---|---|---|
| July 26 | Regional | Siegel Center, Richmond, VA | 104–76 | Hilltop Dawgs | Richmond No. 8 | |
| July 27 | Regional | Siegel Center, Richmond, VA | 80–68 | Best Virginia | Richmond No. 4 | |
| July 28 | Regional | Siegel Center, Richmond, VA | 78–70 | Team DRC | Richmond No. 6 | |
| August 2 | Quarterfinals | Wintrust Arena, Chicago, IL | 86–73 | Loyalty Is Love | Lexington No. 1 | |
| August 4 | Semifinals | Wintrust Arena, Chicago, IL | 66–71 | Carmen's Crew | Columbus No. 1 | |

==== Roster ====
- Dominique Archie
- Bobby Brown
- Justin Burrell
- Drew Gordon
- Johndre Jefferson
- DeAndre Kane
- D. J. Kennedy
- Jeremy Pargo
- Jamarr Sanders
- Jonathon Simmons
- Tony Taylor
- Marc Hughes (coach)
- Paris Horne (asst. coach)

=== 2020: Columbus, Ohio ===
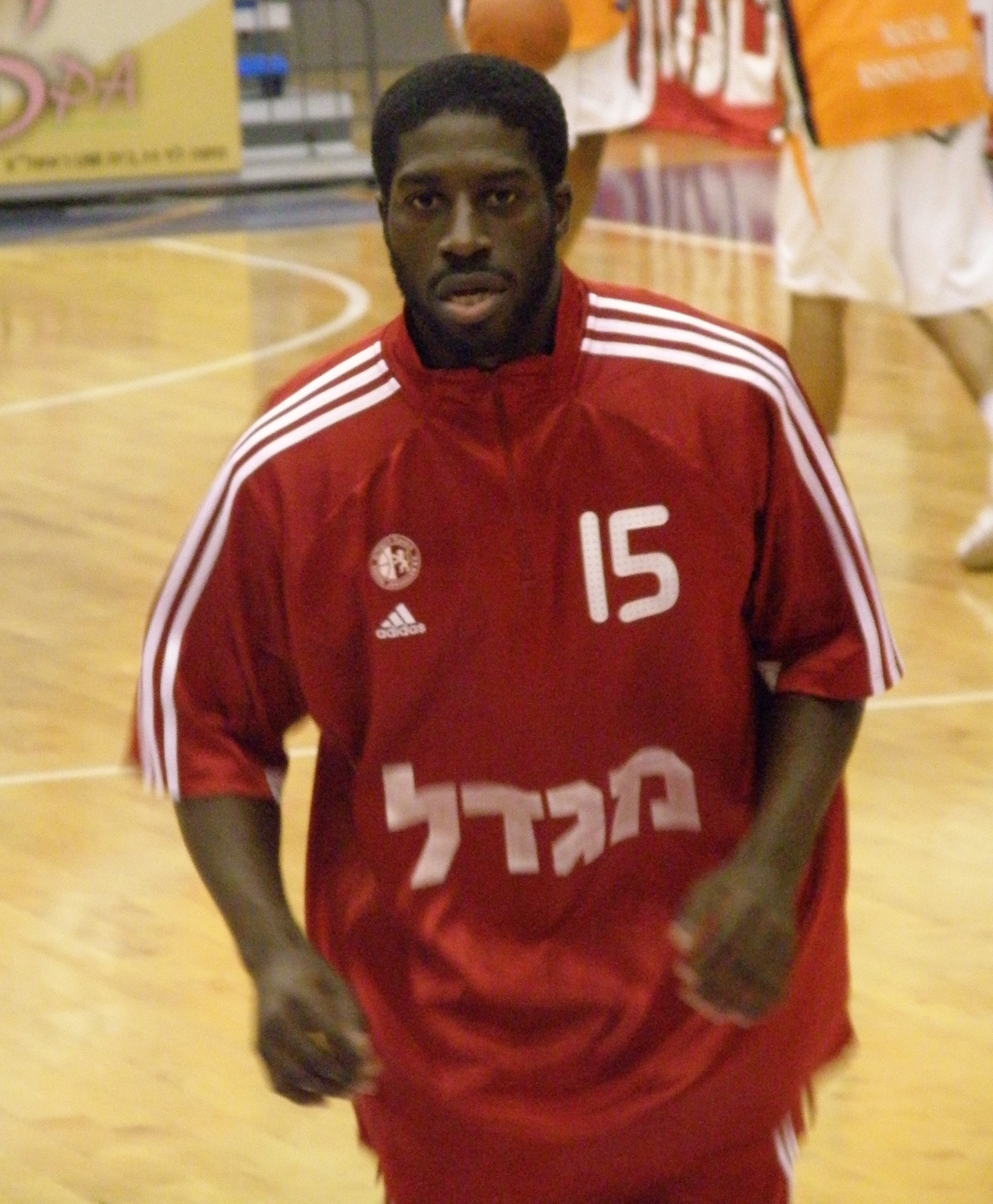
Pooh Jeter was a point guard on the 2020 team

For TBT 2020, Overseas Elite was named the No. 2 seed in a field of 24, reduced in size from previous tournaments due to the COVID-19 pandemic. The team won their first two games, then faced Sideline Cancer in the semifinals. Seeded 22nd, Sideline Cancer had advanced via three wins, including a defeat of third-seed Boeheim's Army. Overseas Elite led by 10 at the half and by seven after three quarters. The teams entered the Elam Ending tied at 59, thus setting a target score of 67 to win. The teams played to a 64–64 tie, with Overseas Elite taking a 65–64 lead on a free throw. The teams then traded misses, followed by Maurice Creek of Sideline Cancer making a three-point shot for a 67–65 win, denying Overseas Elite a chance at a fifth title.

==== Games ====
The team received a first-round bye.

| Date | Round | Location | Score | Opponent | | Stats |
| Date | Round | Location | Score | Team | Seed | Stats |
|---|---|---|---|---|---|---|
| July 9 | Super 16 | Nationwide Arena, Columbus, Ohio | 76–70 | Armored Athlete | 15th overall | |
| July 11 | Quarterfinals | Nationwide Arena, Columbus, Ohio | 93–76 | Herd That | 23rd overall | |
| July 12 | Semifinals | Nationwide Arena, Columbus, Ohio | 65–67 | Sideline Cancer | 22nd overall | |

==== Players ====
- Devin Baulkman
- Bobby Brown
- Justin Burrell
- Pooh Jeter
- Joe Johnson
- Michale Kyser
- Raphiael Putney
- Frank Session
- Xavier Silas
- Asauhn Tatum
- Dakarai Tucker
- Marc Hughes (coach)
- Paris Horne (asst. coach)

=== Later tournaments ===
On June 15, 2021, the team announced that it would not participate in TBT 2021. The team also did not return for TBT 2022.

== Record by years ==
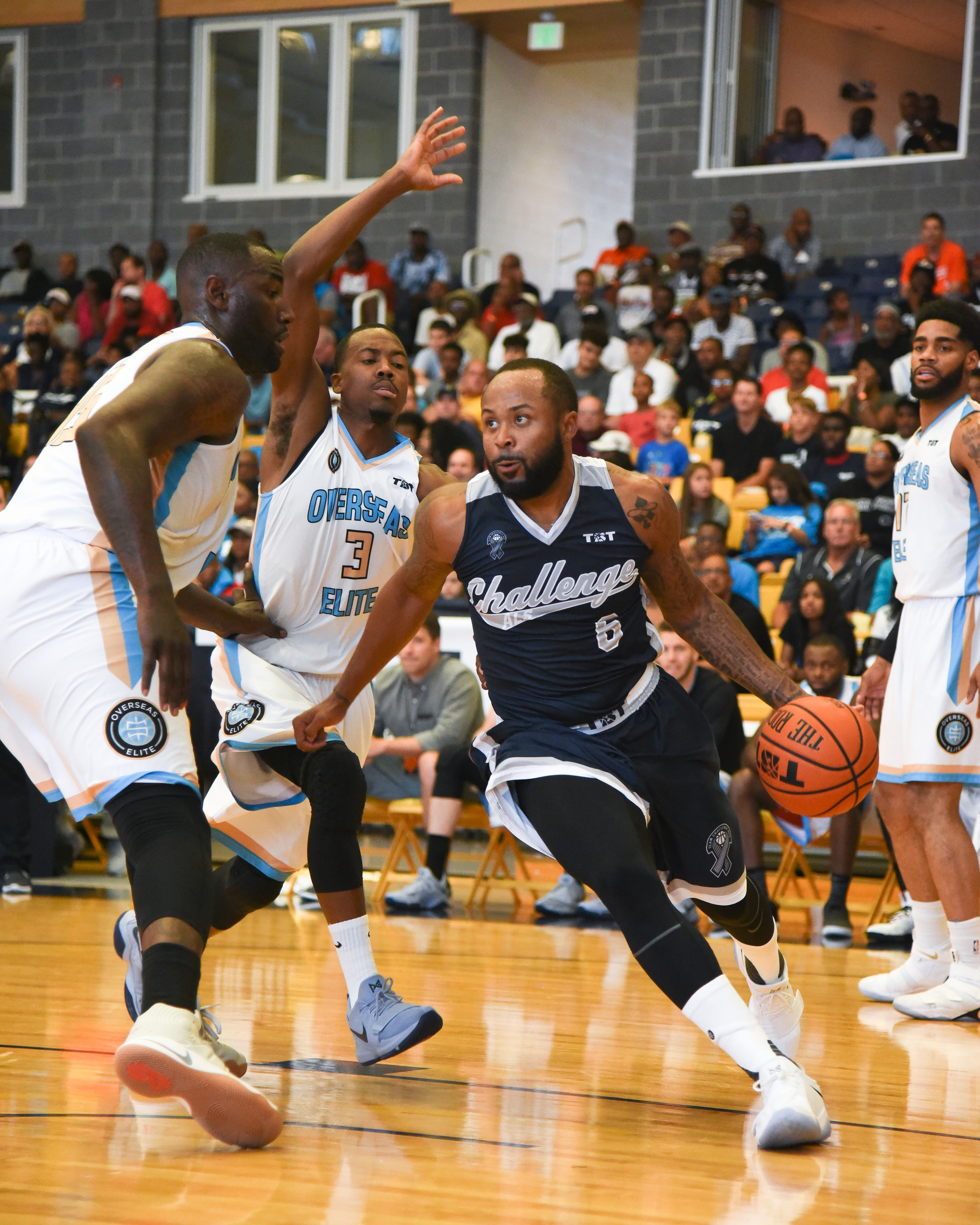
Overseas Elite (in white) during the 2017 title game

| Year | Seed | Won | Lost | Notes |
|---|---|---|---|---|
| 2015 | 3rd South | 7 | 0 | Champions |
| 2016 | 2nd South | 6 | 0 | Champions |
| 2017 | 1st South | 6 | 0 | Champions |
| 2018 | 1st South | 6 | 0 | Champions |
| 2019 | 1st Richmond | 4 | 1 | Lost in semifinals |
| 2020 | 2nd overall | 2 | 1 | Lost in semifinals |
| Total | | 31 | 2 | |

== Awards ==
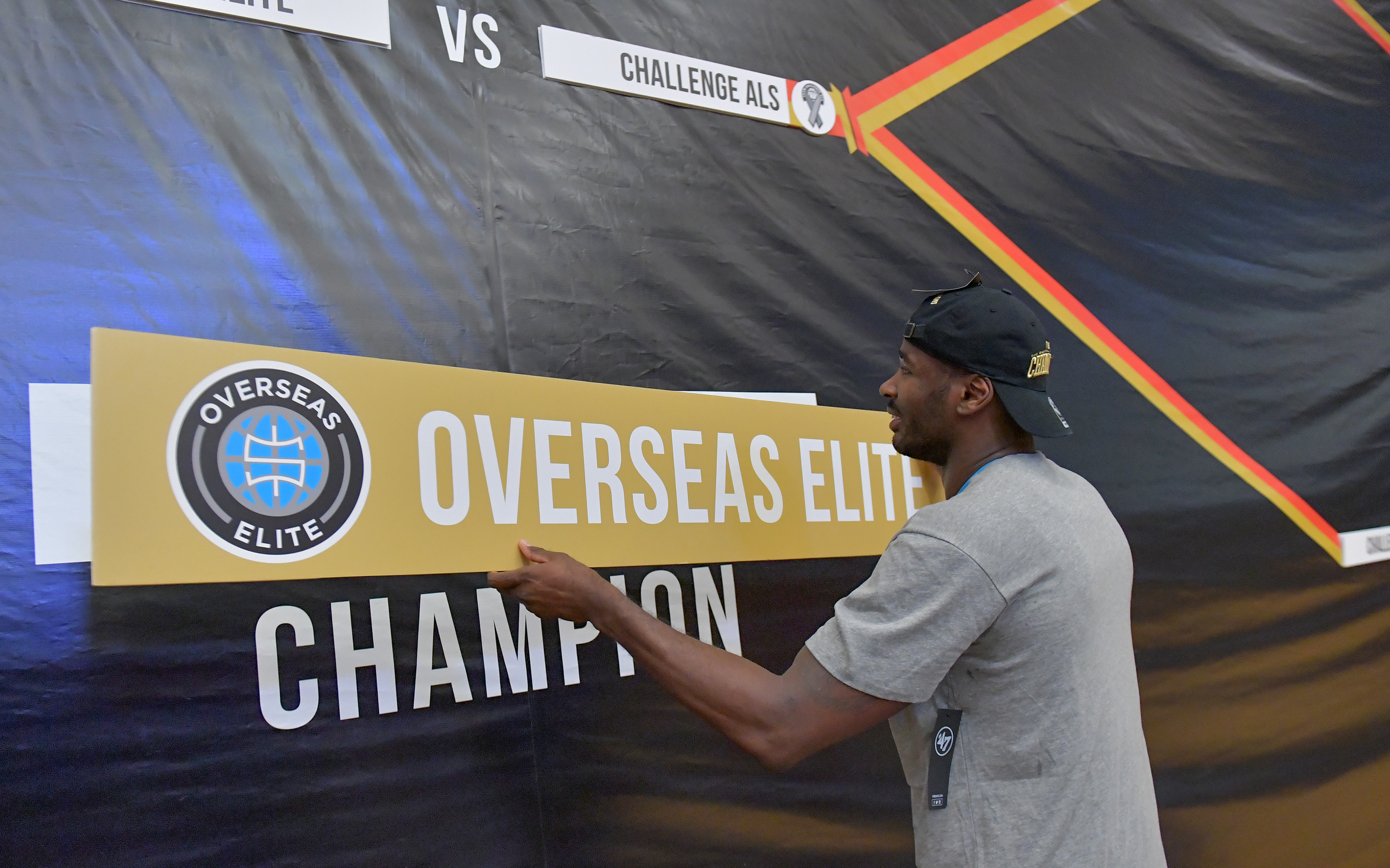
Justin Burrell advancing Overseas Elite's name on the bracket after winning the 2017 championship

| Year | Player | Award | Ref. |
|---|---|---|---|
| 2015 | D. J. Kennedy | MVP† | |
| 2016 | Kyle Fogg | All-Tournament & MVP | |
| 2016 | D. J. Kennedy | All-Tournament | |
| 2017 | Kyle Fogg | All-Tournament & MVP | |
| 2017 | D. J. Kennedy | All-Tournament | |
| 2017 | Colin Curtin (Coach) | All-Tournament | |
| 2018 | D. J. Kennedy | All-Tournament & MVP | |
| 2018 | Errick McCollum | All-Tournament | |
| 2019 | D. J. Kennedy | All-Tournament | |
| 2020 | Joe Johnson | All-Tournament | |

† In 2015, only a tournament MVP was named.

== Logo and uniforms ==
Logo, 2015–current

Uniforms, 2015–current
