= Herd That =

American basketball team

- Leagues: The Basketball Tournament
- Founded: 2018
- History: West Virginia Wildcats (2018–2019); Herd That (2020–present)
- Location: Huntington, West Virginia
- Team colors: Kelly green, white, black
- Assistants: Earl Reed, Marcus Reed, Tommy Orcutt
- Website: Team page
Home	Away

Herd That is an American basketball team that participates in The Basketball Tournament (TBT), an annual winner-take-all single-elimination tournament. The team played as the West Virginia Wildcats in the 2018 and 2019 editions of the TBT, but rebranded as an alumni team of the Marshall Thundering Herd men's basketball program in 2020. The roster of Herd That consists of professional basketball players who compete outside of the NBA.

== History ==
Through the 2024 tournament, the team has amassed a record of 11–7 (.611) in TBT play.

Year	Region	Seed	Results			Ref.
Year	Region	Seed	Round	Opponent	Result	Ref.
2018 (Note: Team played as the West Virginia Wildcats.)	Columbus	16	Play-in	No. 17 Charlotte Chess Center	W 114–87	
2018	Columbus	16	First round	No. 1 Scarlet & Gray	L 68–99	
2019	Columbus	5	First round	No. 4 Big X	L 76–83	
2020	N/A	23	Round of 24	No. 10 Peoria All-Stars	W 80–65	
2020	N/A	23	Round of 16	No. 7 The Money Team	W 102–99	
2020	N/A	23	Quarterfinals	No. 2 Overseas Elite	L 76–93	
2021	West Virginia	3	First round	No. 14 Team DRC	W 85–76	
2021	West Virginia	3	Second round	No. 6 Team 23	L 71–74	
2022	West Virginia	4	First round	No. 5 Founding Fathers	W 77–71	
2022	West Virginia	4	Second round	No. 1 Best Virginia	L 79–89	
2023	West Virginia	4	First round	No. 5 Zoo Crew	W 86–71	
2023	West Virginia	4	Second round	No. 1 Best Virginia	W 74–61	
2023	West Virginia	4	Third round	No. 2 Sideline Cancer	W 73–64	
2023	West Virginia	4	Quarterfinal	No. 2 (SY) Boeheim's Army	W 88–71	
2023	West Virginia	4	Semifinal	No. 2 (W1) Heartfire	L 68–73	
2024	Lexington	1	First round	No. 8 Jackson TN Boom	W 92–57	
2024	Lexington	1	Second round	No. 4 War Ready	W 63–59	
2024	Lexington	1	Third round	No. 2 La Familia	L 66–95	
2025	West Virginia	2	First round	No. 7 Sikh Warriors	W 84–71	
2025	West Virginia	2	Second Round	No. 3 Best Virginia	L 75–82	

== Notable people ==
Notable coaches or players have or currently compete on Herd That include:

- Stevie Browning
- Gay Elmore (Coach)
- Jon Elmore
- DeAndre Kane
- Taevion Kinsey
- Xavier Munford
- Ryan Taylor
- JaCorey Williams
