= Paris Horne =

American basketball player (born 1987)

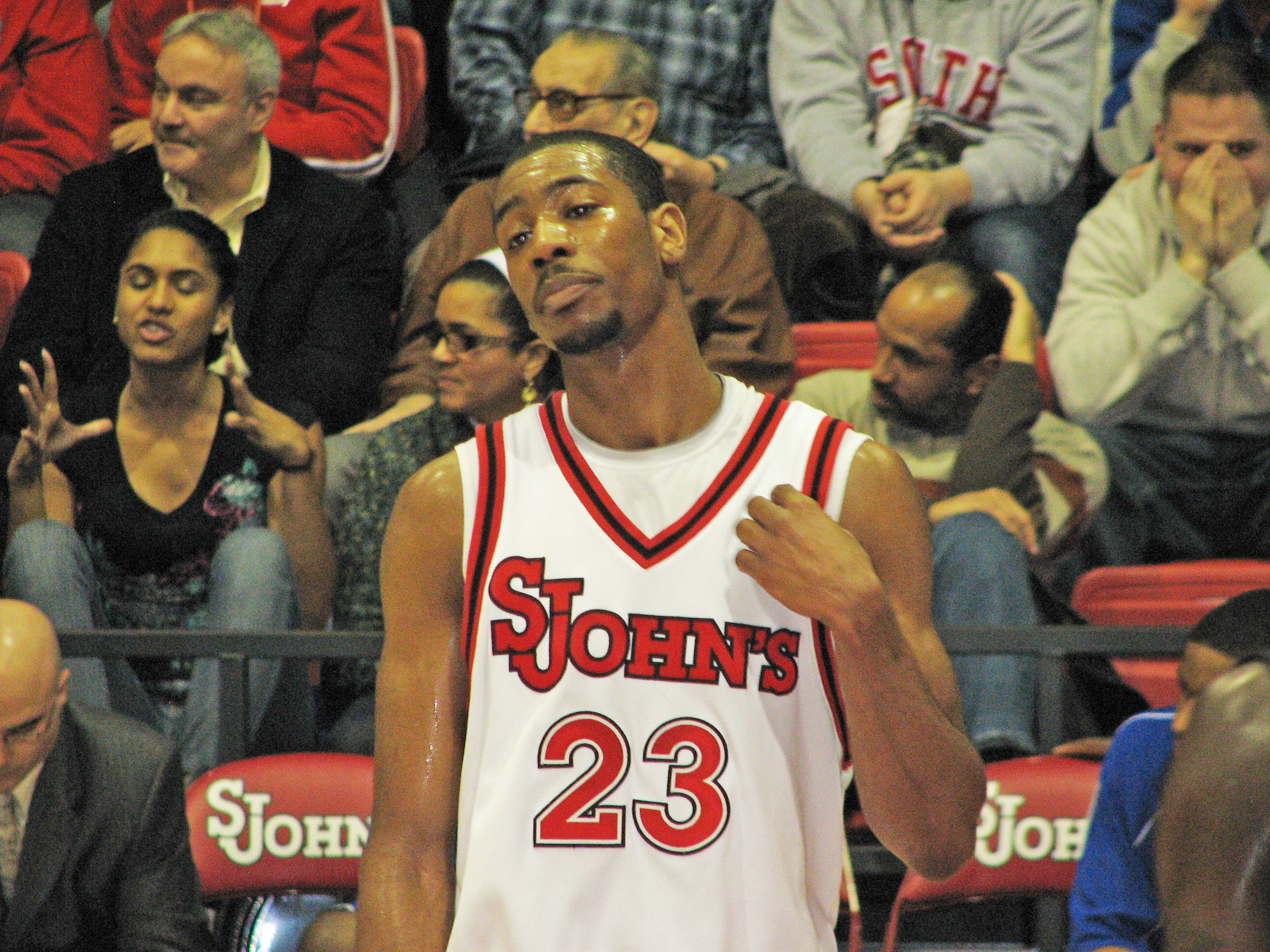
- Horne in 2009

Personal information
- Born: August 6, 1987 (age 39) Philadelphia, Pennsylvania
- Listed height: 6 ft 3 in (1.91 m)
- Listed weight: 189 lb (86 kg)

Career information
- High school: Bridgton Academy (North Bridgton, Maine)
- College: St. John's (2007–2011)
- NBA draft: 2011: undrafted
- Playing career: 2011–2016
- Position: Point guard

Career history
- 2011–2012: BG Göttingen
- 2012–2013: Rethymno Aegean
- 2013–2016: Büyükçekmece Basketbol
- 2016: Kouvot

Paris L. Horne (born August 6, 1987) is an American professional basketball player who last played for Kouvot of the Finnish Korisliiga. Horne played college basketball at St. John's University. He has played for BG Gottingen in Germany and competed at the FIBA EuroChallenge 2012 (6 games and 10.7 ppg).

== The Basketball Tournament ==
Horne has competed for Overseas Elite in The Basketball Tournament (TBT), a single-elimination winner-take-all tournament held annually since 2014 in the United States. He was a point guard on the 2015 team which won TBT's $1 million prize. Horne was also a part of the 2016, 2017, and 2018 iterations of Overseas Elite, each of which took home a $2 million prize.

In 2016, Horne averaged 5.8 points per game (PPG) as well as 1.7 assists per game (APG) and 1.2 steals per game. In 2017, Horne averaged 2.8 PPG. In TBT 2018, Horne played six games. He averaged 4.2 PPG and 2.0 rebounds per game while shooting 59%. Overseas Elite reached the championship game and played Eberlein Drive, winning 70–58 for their fourth consecutive TBT title. In TBT 2019, Horne was the team's general manager and assistant coach. The team advanced to the semifinals, where they suffered their first-ever defeat, losing to Carmen's Crew, 71–66.
