= Boeheim's Army =

Professional basketball team

- Leagues: The Basketball Tournament
- Founded: 2015
- History: Boeheim's Army (2015–present)
- Team colors: Orange and white
- General manager: Kevin Belbey & Shaun Belbey
- Head coach: Ryan Blackwell
- Championships: 1 (2021)
- Website: Team page

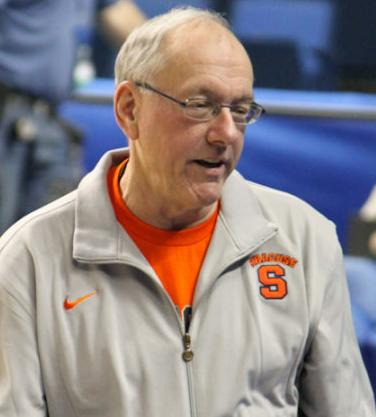
Team namesake Jim Boeheim

Boeheim's Army are an American basketball team that participates in The Basketball Tournament (TBT), an annual winner-take-all single-elimination tournament. The team's roster consists of professional basketball players who compete outside of the NBA, most of whom played college basketball for the Syracuse Orange men's basketball team. The TBT team is an independent entity that is named after Jim Boeheim, longtime coach of the college team. Boeheim's Army first played in the tournament in 2015; in 2021, they won the championship and a $1 million prize.

== History ==
=== 2015 ===
In TBT 2015, the team was seeded no. 1 in the Northeast Regional and received a first-round bye.

Date	Round	Location	Score	Opponent		Ref.
Date	Round	Location	Score	Team	Seed	Ref.
July 18	Second round	Philadelphia, PA	91–73	NYCSuperstars	Northeast No. 13	
July 19	Third round	Philadelphia, PA	92–91 (OT)	20th & Olney	Northeast No. 8	
July 24	Super 17	Chicago, IL	78–72	Liberty Ballers	Northeast No. 5	
July 25	Quarterfinals	Chicago, IL	76–80	Team City of Gods	Northeast No. 3	

=== 2016 ===
In TBT 2016, the team was seeded no. 2 in the Northeast Regional.

Date	Round	Location	Score	Opponent		Ref.
Date	Round	Location	Score	Team	Seed	Ref.
July 16	First round	Philadelphia, PA	87–59	Basketball City	Northeast No.	
July 17	Second round	Philadelphia, PA	86–82	North Broad Street Bullies	Northeast No.	
July 21	Super 16	Philadelphia, PA	84–91	The Untouchables	Northeast No 3.	

=== 2017 ===
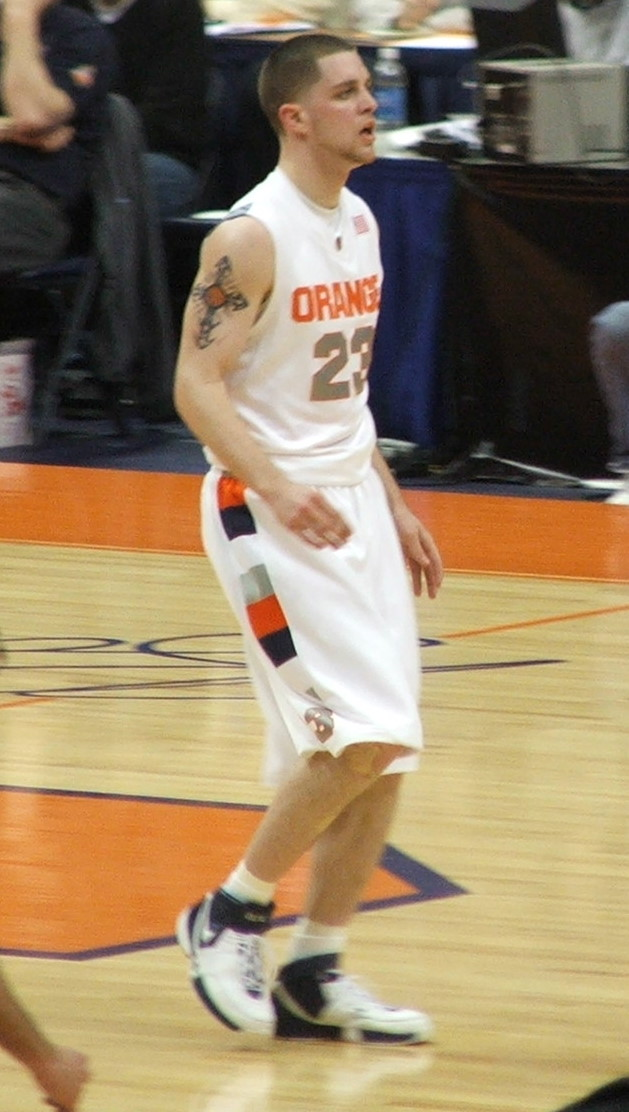
Eric Devendorf was named to the All-Tournament team in 2017.

For TBT 2017, the team was seeded no. 3 in the Northeast Region.

Date	Round	Location	Score	Opponent		Ref.
Date	Round	Location	Score	Team	Seed	Ref.
July 8	First round	Philadelphia, PA	99–66	Dubois Dream	Northeast No. 14	
July 9	Second round	Philadelphia, PA	106–100 (2OT)	Gaelnation	Northeast No. 11	
July 20	Regional semifinals	Brooklyn, NY	65–61	Team Fancy	Northeast No. 7	
July 23	Regional final	Brooklyn, NY	72–67	Team FOE	Northeast No. 4	
August 1	National semifinal	Baltimore, MD	77–81	Overseas Elite	South No. 1	

=== 2018 ===
For TBT 2018, the team was seeded no. 1 in the Northeast Region.

Date	Round	Location	Score	Opponent		Ref.
Date	Round	Location	Score	Team	Seed	Ref.
July 21	Round 1	Brooklyn, NY	90–72	South Jamaica Kings	Northeast No. 17	
July 22	Round 2	Brooklyn, NY	60–55	Team Fancy	Northeast No. 8	
July 28	Super 16	Atlanta, GA	73–69	Armored Athlete	Northeast No. 4	
July 29	Quarterfinals	Atlanta, GA	86–90	Golden Eagles	Northeast No. 3	

=== 2019 ===
For TBT 2019, the team was seeded no. 1 in the Syracuse Regional.

Date	Round	Location	Score	Opponent		Ref.
Date	Round	Location	Score	Team	Seed	Ref.
July 26	Round 1	SRC Arena, Syracuse, NY	68–65	We Are D3	Syracuse No. 8	
July 27	Round 2	SRC Arena, Syracuse, NY	84–74	GaelNation	Syracuse No. 5	
July 28	Round 3	SRC Arena, Syracuse, NY	72–84	Team Brotherly Love	Syracuse No. 3	

=== 2020 ===
For TBT 2020, the team was the no. 3 overall seed in a field reduced to 24 teams due to the COVID-19 pandemic, and received a first-round bye.

Date	Round	Location	Score	Opponent		Ref.
Date	Round	Location	Score	Team	Seed	Ref.
July 7	Round of 16	Nationwide Arena, Columbus, Ohio	76–69	Men of Mackey	19th overall	
July 11	Quarterfinals	Nationwide Arena, Columbus, Ohio	48–65	Sideline Cancer	22nd overall	

=== 2021 ===
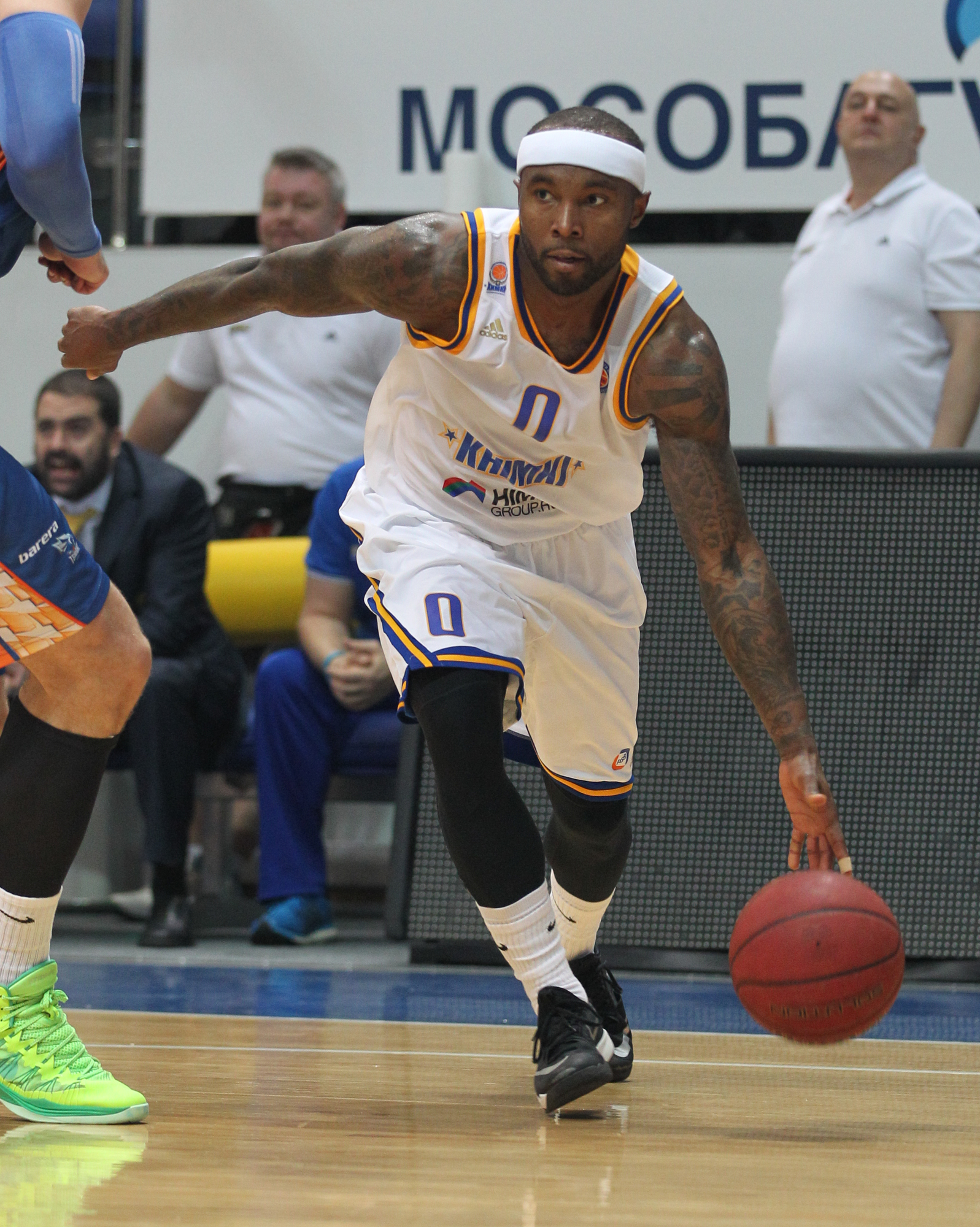
Tyrese Rice, who played college basketball for Boston College rather than Syracuse, was named tournament MVP in 2021.

For TBT 2021, the team was seeded no. 3 in the Illinois Regional.

Date	Round	Location	Score	Opponent		Ref.
Date	Round	Location	Score	Team	Seed	Ref.
July 24	First round	Covelli Center, Columbus, Ohio	65–53	Forces of Seoul	Illinois No. 14	
July 26	Second round	Covelli Center, Columbus, Ohio	68–62	Heartfire	Illinois No. 11	
July 28	Regional semifinals	Covelli Center, Columbus, Ohio	69–54	Always a Brave	Illinois No. 7	
July 31	Regional final	UD Arena, Dayton, Ohio	73–69	Golden Eagles	Illinois No. 1	
August 1	Semifinal	UD Arena, Dayton, Ohio	66–64	Florida TNT	Wichita No. 5	
August 3	Final	UD Arena, Dayton, Ohio	69–67	Team 23	West Virginia No. 6	

=== 2022 ===
For TBT 2022, the team was seeded no. 1 in the Syracuse Regional.

Date	Round	Location	Score	Opponent		Ref.
Date	Round	Location	Score	Team	Seed	Ref.
July 22	First round	SRC Arena; Syracuse, New York	90–62	India Rising	Syracuse No. 8	
July 23	Second round	SRC Arena; Syracuse, New York	74–81	The Nerd Team	Syracuse No. 4	

=== 2023 ===
For TBT 2023, the team was seeded no. 2 in the Syracuse Regional.

Date	Round	Location	Score	Opponent		Ref.
Date	Round	Location	Score	Team	Seed	Ref.
July 24	First round	The Oncenter; Syracuse, New York	99–83	Team Gibson	Syracuse No. 7	
July 26	Second round	The Oncenter; Syracuse, New York	83–75	The Nerd Team	Syracuse No. 3	
July 28	Third round	The Oncenter; Syracuse, New York	69–55	Blue Collar U	Syracuse No. 1	
July 30	Quarterfinals	WesBanco Arena; Wheeling, West Virginia	71–88	Herd That	West Virginia No. 4	

=== 2024 ===
Boeheim's Army announced that they were not able to compete in the 2024 tournament due to scheduling issues.

=== 2025 ===
In TBT 2025, the team was seeded no. 1 in the Syracuse Regional.

Date	Round	Location	Score	Opponent	
Date	Round	Location	Score	Team	Seed
July 19	First round	Syracuse, New York	97–71	Herkimer Originals	Syracuse No. 8
July 21	Second round	Syracuse, New York	78–81	We Are D3	Syracuse No. 4

=== 2026 ===
Date	Round	Location	Score	Opponent
Date	Round	Location	Score	Team
July 21	First round (Best of 3)	South Orange, New Jersey	82–52	Hall In
July 23	First round (Best of 3)	Syracuse, New York	81–76	Hall In
July 26	Alumni semifinal	Lexington, Kentucky	66–70	La Familia

== Record by years ==
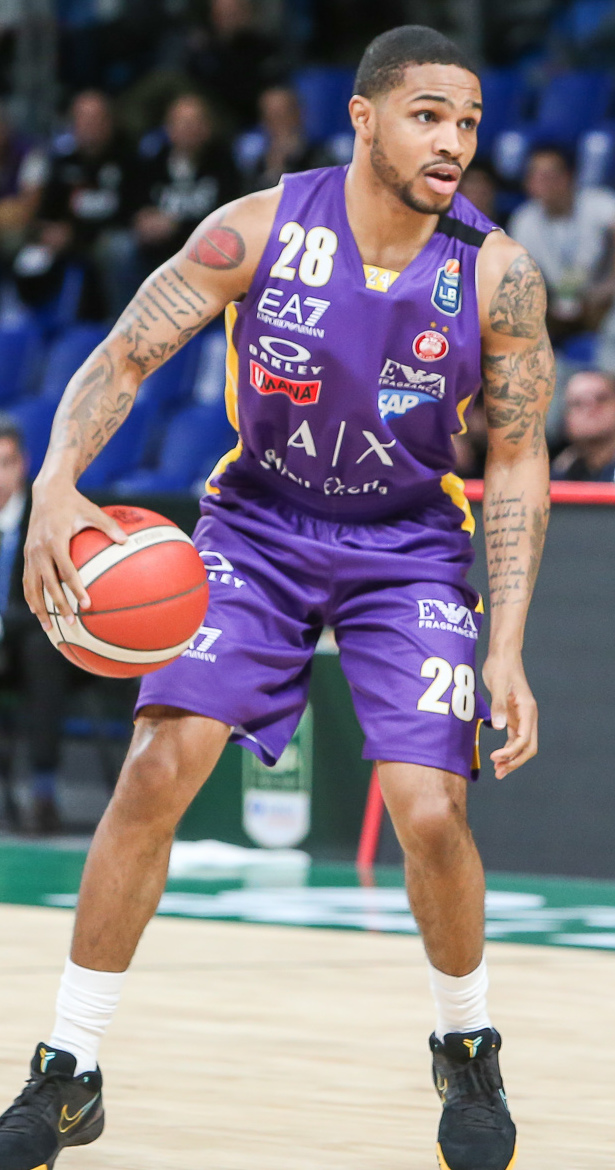
Keifer Sykes hit the game-winning shot in the 2021 championship contest.

Year	Seed	Won	Lost	Notes
2015	1st Northeast	3	1	lost in Quarterfinals
2016	2nd Northeast	2	1	lost in Super 16
2017	3rd Northeast	4	1	lost in Semifinals
2018	1st Northeast	3	1	lost in Quarterfinals
2019	1st Syracuse	2	1	lost in Regional Final
2020	3rd overall	1	1	lost in Quarterfinals
2021	3rd Illinois	6	0	Champions
2022	1st Syracuse	1	1	lost in second round
2023	2nd Syracuse	3	1	lost in Quarterfinals
2025	1st Syracuse	1	1	lost in second round
2026	—	2	1	lost in alumni semifinal
Total		28	10	

== Awards ==
Year	Player	Award	Ref.
2017	Eric Devendorf	All-Tournament	
2021	Tyrese Rice	All-Tournament & MVP	
2021	Kevin Belbey	All-Tournament (GM)	
