= Justin Burrell =

American basketball player

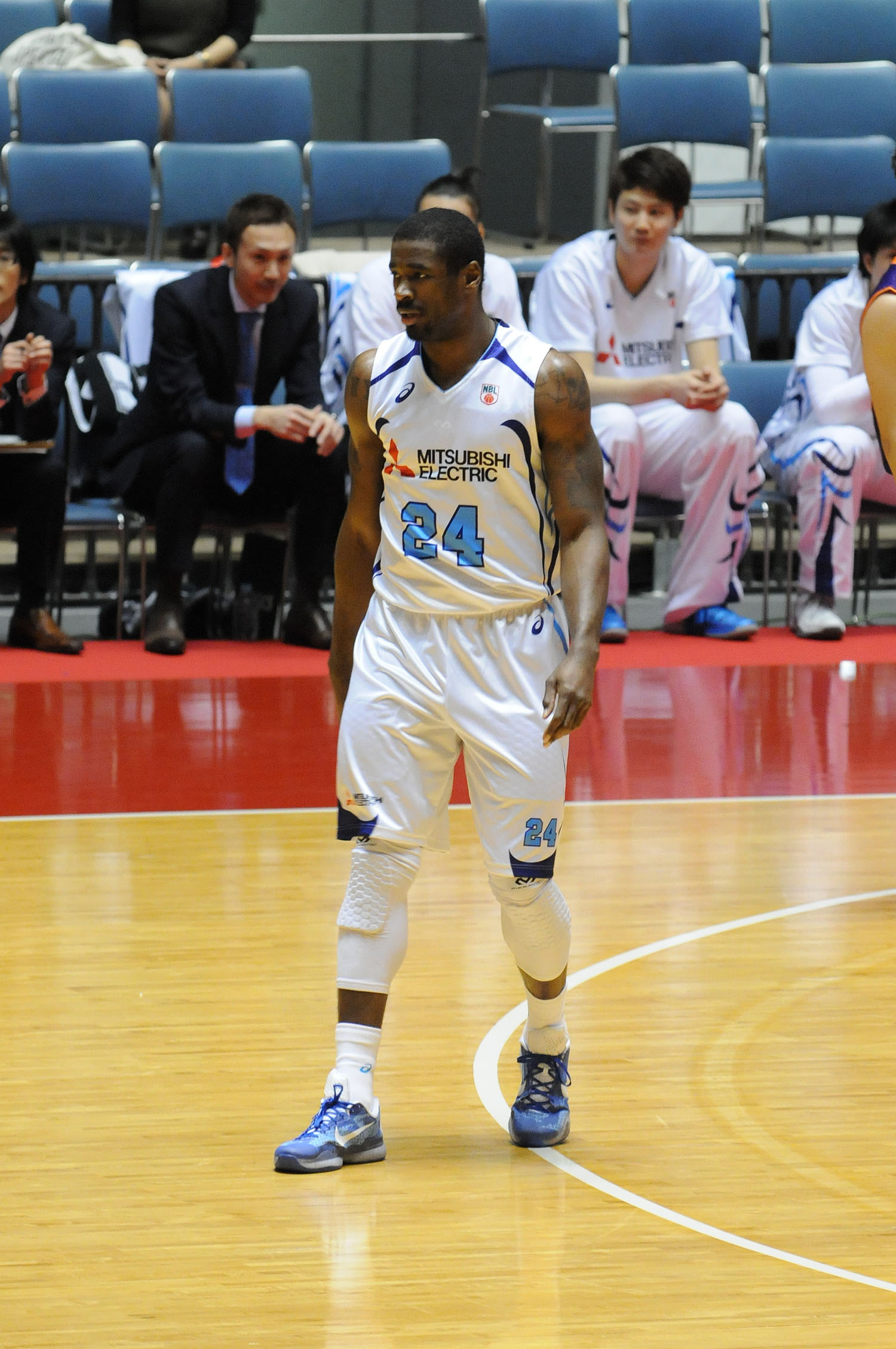

No. 25 – Rizing Zephyr Fukuoka
- Position: Power forward
- League: B.League

Personal information
- Born: April 18, 1988 (age 38) Bronx, New York, U.S.
- Listed height: 6 ft 10 in (2.08 m)
- Listed weight: 245 lb (111 kg)

Career information
- High school: Our Saviour Lutheran (The Bronx, New York); Bridgton Academy (North Bridgton, Maine)
- College: St. John's (2007–2011)
- NBA draft: 2011: undrafted
- Playing career: 2011–present

Career history
- 2011–2012: Yokohama B-Corsairs
- 2012–2013: Champagne Châlons-Reims Basket
- 2013–2014: Cholet Basket
- 2014–2015: Chiba Jets
- 2015–2021: Nagoya Diamond Dolphins
- 2021–2023: Sendai 89ers
- 2023–2024: Shiga Lakes
- 2024–present: Rizing Zephyr Fukuoka

Career highlights
- Big East Conference Men's Basketball Sixth Man of the Year (2011); bj League MVP (2011–12); bj League Best Five (2011–12); bj League All-star Game (2011–12)

Justin Burrell (born April 18, 1988) is an American professional basketball player for Rizing Zephyr Fukuoka of the B.League. He played college basketball for the St. John's Red Storm from 2007 to 2011 and received the Big East Conference Sixth Man of the Year award in 2011.

== Overseas Elite ==
In 2017, Justin Burrell joined Overseas Elite for The Basketball Tournament (TBT), a $2 million winner-take-all competition aired annually on ESPN. During TBT 2017, Burrell averaged 9.2 points per game (PPG) and 4.8 rebounds per game (RPG) to help Overseas Elite claim their third consecutive title. In TBT 2018, Burrell played six games. He averaged 12.0 PPG and 7.0 RPG on 69 percent shooting. Overseas Elite reached the championship game and played Eberlein Drive, winning 70–58 for their fourth consecutive TBT title. In TBT 2019, Burrell and Overseas Elite advanced to the semifinals where they suffered their first-ever defeat, losing to Carmen's Crew, 71–66.

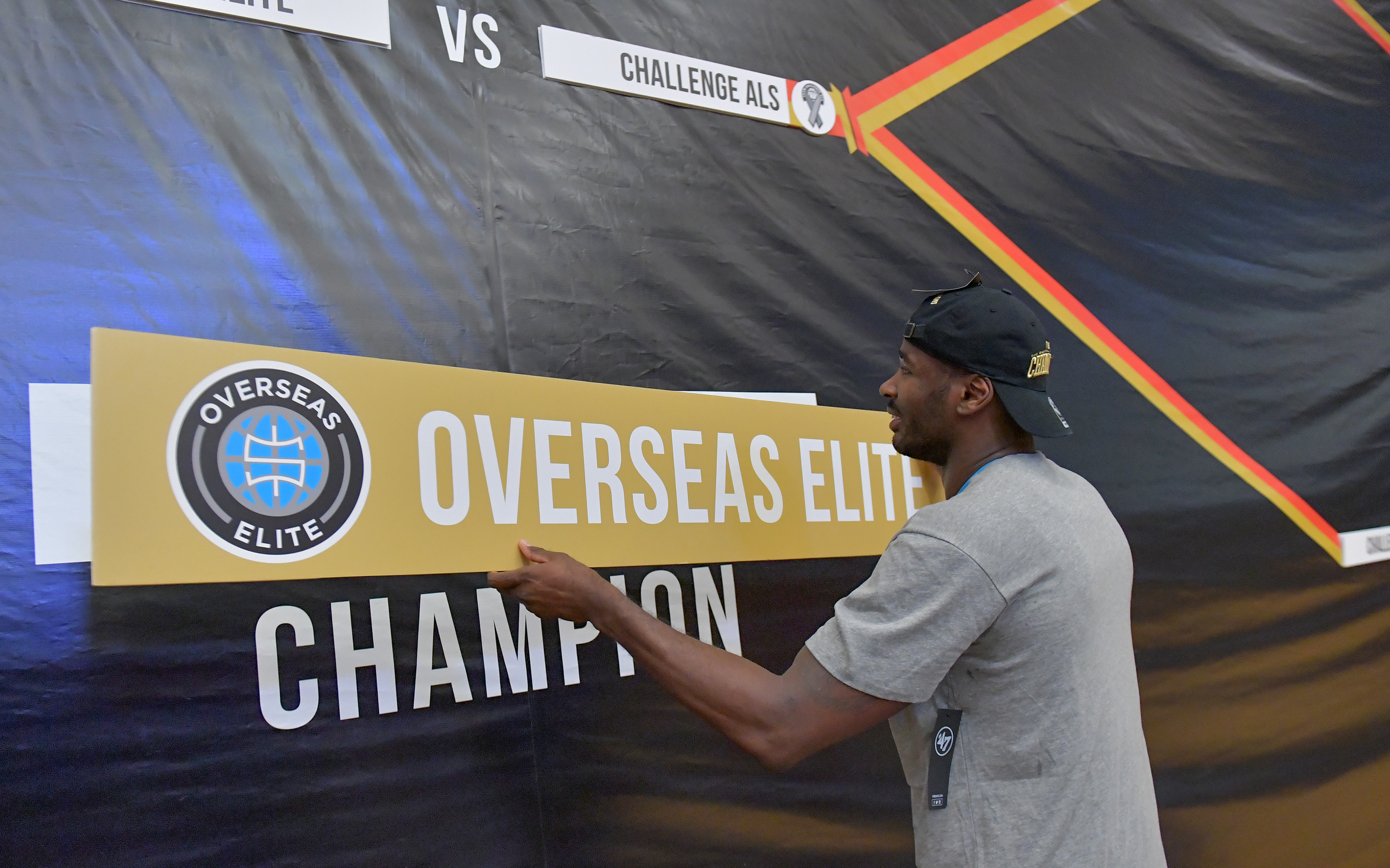
Burrell advancing Overseas Elite's name on the bracket after winning the 2017 championship

== Career statistics ==
Legend
GP	Games played	GS	Games started	MPG	Minutes per game
FG%	Field goal percentage	3P%	3-point field goal percentage	FT%	Free throw percentage
RPG	Rebounds per game	APG	Assists per game	SPG	Steals per game
BPG	Blocks per game	PPG	Points per game	**Bold**	Career high

Year	Team	GP	GS	MPG	FG%	3P%	FT%	RPG	APG	SPG	BPG	PPG
2011–12	Yokohama	52	52	31.8	.517	.333	.675	9.9	1.9	0.9	0.5	18.7
2014–15	Chiba	54	38	26.8	.539	.250	.650	8.1	1.4	0.3	0.5	15.5
2015–16	Mitsubishi	53	48	31.9	.528	.267	.642	9.3	2.1	0.6	0.8	17.0
2016–17	Nagoya D	45	45	27.6	.540	.333	.731	8.4	1.9	0.4	1.0	16.8
2017–18	Nagoya D	56	50	22.9	.608	.222	.771	7.5	2.4	0.5	0.5	14.8
