= Carmen's Crew =

Professional basketball team

- Leagues: The Basketball Tournament
- Founded: 2017
- History: Carmen's Crew (2019–2021; 2023–present); Scarlet & Gray (2017–2018)
- Team colors: Scarlet and gray
- Head coach: Leon Rodgers
- Assistants: James Sullinger; Terence Dials
- Championships: 2 TBT champions (2019, 2024); 4 TBT Regional champions (2017, 2018, 2019, 2024)
- Website: Team page

Carmen's Crew are an American basketball team that regularly participates in The Basketball Tournament (TBT), an annual winner-take-all single-elimination tournament. The team first played in the tournament in 2017 under the name Scarlet & Gray, and won the championship in 2019 and 2024. The team's roster consists of professional basketball players who compete outside of the NBA, most of whom played college basketball for the Ohio State Buckeyes men's basketball team. The TBT team is an independent entity that was previously named after the college team's colors (scarlet and gray), and is currently named after Ohio State's school song ("Carmen Ohio"). The team last competed in the 2025 edition of TBT.

== Season-by-season results ==
=== 2017 ===
During TBT 2017, team competed under the name Scarlet & Gray, and were the No. 2 seed in the Midwest Region.

Date	Round	Location	Score	Opponent		Ref.
Date	Round	Location	Score	Team	Seed	Ref.
July 8	Regional	Peoria, IL	78–63	The Region	Midwest No. 15	
July 9	Regional	Peoria, IL	72–58	Banner Boys	Midwest No. 7	
July 22	Regional semifinals	Brooklyn, NY	81–72	Always a Brave	Midwest No. 3	
July 23	Regional final	Brooklyn, NY	81–56	Golden Eagles	Midwest No. 1	
August 1	National semifinals	Baltimore, MD	83–88 (2 OT)	Team Challenge ALS	West No. 6	

=== 2018 ===
During TBT 2018, team again competed under the name Scarlet & Gray, and were the No. 1 seed in the Midwest Region.

Date	Round	Location	Score	Opponent		Ref.
Date	Round	Location	Score	Team	Seed	Ref.
July 21	Round 1	Columbus, OH	99–68	West Virginia Wildcats	Midwest No. 16	
July 22	Round 2	Columbus, OH	82–73	Matadors	Midwest No. 9	
July 27	Super 16	Atlanta, GA	72–60	PrimeTime Players	Midwest No. 12	
July 29	Quarterfinals	Atlanta, GA	78–100	Team Fredette	Midwest No. 2	

=== 2019 ===
For TBT 2019, team adopted the Carmen's Crew name, and were the No. 1 seed in the Columbus Regional.

Date	Round	Location	Score	Opponent		Ref.
Date	Round	Location	Score	Team	Seed	Ref.
July 19	Round 1	Bexley, OH	88–71	Illinois BC	Columbus No. 8	
July 20	Round 2	Bexley, OH	89–75	Big X	Columbus No. 4	
July 21	Round 3	Bexley, OH	85–71	Red Scare	Columbus No. 3	
August 1	Quarterfinals	Chicago, IL	79–71	Eberlein Drive	Salt Lake No. 1	
August 4	Semifinals	Chicago, IL	71–66	Overseas Elite	Richmond No. 1	
August 6	Final	Chicago, IL	66–60	Golden Eagles	Wichita No. 1	

=== 2020 ===
For TBT 2020, the defending champions were the No. 1 overall seed in a reduced field of 24 teams.

Date	Round	Location	Score	Opponent		Ref.
Date	Round	Location	Score	Team	Seed	Ref.
July 8	Round of 16	Columbus, OH	68–76	House of 'Paign	No. 16	

=== 2021 ===
For TBT 2021, the team was seeded No. 1 in the Columbus Regional.

Date	Round	Location	Score	Opponent		Ref.
Date	Round	Location	Score	Team	Seed	Ref.
July 23	First round	Columbus, OH	77–65	Mid-American Unity	Columbus No. 16	
July 25	Second round	Columbus, OH	80–69	Men of Mackey	Columbus No. 8	
July 27	Regional semifinals	Columbus, OH	89–91	The Money Team	Columbus No. 5	

=== 2022 ===
In 2022, the team announced that they couldn't get enough players for TBT 2022.

=== 2023 ===
For TBT 2023, the team was seeded No. 4 in the Dayton Regional.

Date	Round	Location	Score	Opponent		Ref.
Date	Round	Location	Score	Team	Seed	Ref.
July 26	First round	Dayton, OH	80–68	Team Overtime	Dayton No. 5	
July 28	Second round	Dayton, OH	82–56	India Rising	Dayton No. 8	
July 29	Regional semifinals	Dayton, OH	68–72	Friday Beers	Dayton No. 2	

=== 2024 ===
For the 2024 tournament, the team was seeded No. 3 in the Dayton Regional. They went on to win their second title.

Date	Round	Location	Score	Opponent		Ref.
Date	Round	Location	Score	Team	Seed	Ref.
July 20	Round of 64	Dayton, OH	93–58	Purple Hearts	Dayton No. 6	
July 22	Round of 32	Dayton, OH	71–60	Red Scare	Dayton No. 2	
July 24	Round of 16	Dayton, OH	74–70	Heartfire	Dayton No. 1	
July 29	Quarterfinals	Louisville, KY	90–74	Takeover BC	Cincinnati No. 7	
August 2	Semifinals	Philadelphia, PA	76–70	La Familia	Lexington No. 2	
August 4	Final	Philadelphia, PA	69–65	Forever Coogs	Houston No. 2	

=== 2025 ===
For the 2025 tournament, the team was seeded No. 1 in the Indianapolis Regional.

Date	Round	Location	Score	Opponent		Ref.
Date	Round	Location	Score	Team	Seed	Ref.
July 19	Round of 64	Indianapolis, IN	78–67	GoTime Green Machine	Indianapolis No. 8	
July 21	Round of 32	Indianapolis, IN	73–69	Fort Wayne Champs	Indianapolis No. 5	
July 22	Round of 16 (Indianapolis Regional Championship)	Indianapolis, IN	62–68	Fail Harder	Indianapolis No. 7	

== Record ==
Year	Seed	Won	Lost	Notes
2017	2nd Midwest	4	1	lost in semifinals
2018	1st Midwest	3	1	lost in quarterfinals
2019	1st Columbus	6	0	Champions
2020	1st overall	0	1	lost in round of 16
2021	1st Columbus	2	1	lost in regional semifinals
2022		—	—	did not enter
2023	4th Dayton	2	1	lost in regional semifinals
2024	3rd Dayton	6	0	Champions
2025	1st Indianapolis	2	1	lost in round of 16
Total		25	6	

== All-time players ==
As of 2024, 36 total players have played for the team, 20 of which are Ohio State alumni.

- Talor Battle, PG, Penn State – 2018
- Javon Bess, Saint Louis – 2023
- Desonta Bradford, PG, East Tennessee State – 2024
- William Buford, SG, Ohio State – 2017, 2018, 2019, 2020, 2021, 2023
- Aaron Craft, PG, Ohio State – 2017, 2018, 2019, 2020, 2021
- Jon Diebler, SG, Ohio State – 2017, 2018, 2019, 2020, 2021
- Malik Dime, G, Washington – 2020, 2023
- Jeff Gibbs, PF/C, Otterbein – 2019, 2020, 2021, 2024
- Tevin Glass, SF, East Tennessee State – 2024
- C.J. Jackson, Ohio State – 2023
- Kosta Koufos, C, Ohio State – 2021
- Dallas Lauderdale, PF, Ohio State – 2017, 2018, 2020
- David Lighty, G/F, Ohio State – 2017, 2018, 2019, 2020, 2021
- Julian Mavunga, G, Miami (OH) – 2021
- Demetri McCamey, G, Illinois – 2019, 2020
- Nate Miller, SG, Bowling Green – 2017, 2018
- Jamel Morris, SG, Fairmont State – 2024
- Byron Mullens, C, Ohio State – 2018
- Erick Neal, PG, UT Arlington – 2024
- Greg Oden, C, Ohio State – 2018
- Courtney Pigram, PG, East Tennessee State – 2019
- Evan Ravenel, PF, Ohio State – 2017, 2018, 2019, 2020, 2021
- Leon Rodgers, PF, Northern Illinois – 2017, 2018, 2019
- LaQuinton Ross, F, Ohio State – 2019
- Shannon Scott, PG, Ohio State – 2021
- Lenzelle Smith Jr., SG, Ohio State – 2020, 2021
- Jared Sullinger, PF, Ohio State – 2017, 2018, 2024
- Jalen Tate, Arkansas – 2023
- Deshaun Thomas, SF, Ohio State – 2020
- Scott Thomas, SF, Bowling Green – 2023, 2024
- Trevor Thompson, Ohio State – 2023
- Andre Wesson, SF, Ohio State – 2023, 2024
- Kaleb Wesson, C, Ohio State – 2023, 2024
- John Williamson, C, Cincinnati – 2019
- Keyshawn Woods, G, Ohio State – 2021, 2023, 2024
- Kyle Young, SF, Ohio State – 2023, 2024

== Awards ==
Year	Player	Award	Ref.
2017	Jared Sullinger	All-Tournament	
2019	William Buford	All-Tournament & MVP	
2019	Aaron Craft	All-Tournament	
2024	Jared Sullinger	All-Tournament & MVP	
