= The Basketball Tournament 2021 =

Single elimination basketball tournament

The Basketball Tournament
- 2021

Tournament information
- Location: Regional sites: Wichita, Kansas; Charleston, West Virginia; Columbus, Ohio; Peoria, Illinois; Championship site: Dayton, Ohio
- Dates: July 16–August 3, 2021
- Tournament format: Single elimination
- Participants: 64 teams
- Purse: Championship: US$1,000,000 winner-take-all

Final positions
- Champions: Boeheim's Army
- Runner-up: Team 23

Tournament statistics
- MVP: Tyrese Rice
- Top scorers: Tyrese Rice (86 pts); Marvelle Harris (23.3 ppg) (Note: Minimum three games played)
- Games played: 63

The Basketball Tournament 2021 was the eighth edition of The Basketball Tournament (TBT), a 5-on-5, single elimination basketball tournament. The tournament, involving 64 teams, began on July 16 and concluded on August 3 with the championship game in Dayton, Ohio. The format of the tournament returned to that of the 2019 edition—64 teams, each playing in one of four regionals, with the top two teams from each regional progressing to the championship weekend. The tournament was won by Boeheim's Army, who captured the winner-take-all $1 million prize.

== Format ==
For its 2021 edition, The Basketball Tournament (TBT) returned to a 64-team format, with four regionals of 16 teams each (similar in format to the NCAA Division I men's basketball tournament), and each regional being held at a single host site. The regional host sites and teams were revealed by TBT organizers on April 14, 2021. The tournament prize remained at $1 million. The teams and their regional placements were revealed in a selection special hosted by Seth Greenberg and Chris Vosters that aired on TBT's YouTube channel on June 21, 2021.

As with previous years, all tournament games operated with the "Elam Ending", a format of ending the game without use of a game clock. Under the Elam Ending, the clock is turned off at the first dead-ball whistle with under four minutes to play in the game. At that time, a target score, equal to the score of the leading team plus eight, is set, and the first team to reach this target score is declared the winner of the game. Thus, all games end on a made basket (field goal or free throw) and there is no overtime.

The first edition of a "33-Point Contest" was held between the two semifinal games—individual players competed to see who could make 11 three-point field goals the fastest. The contest, and prize of $33,333.33, was won by Omar Strong of team B1 Ballers.

== Venues ==
The Basketball Tournament 2021 featured games in five locations: four regional sites plus one site for the championship weekend (four regional finals, two semifinal contests, and the championship game).

The Basketball Tournament 2021 is located in the United States
The Basketball Tournament 2021 is located in the United States	Wichita	Charleston	Columbus
The Basketball Tournament 2021 is located in the United States	Charles Koch Arena	Charleston Coliseum & Convention Center	Covelli Center
The Basketball Tournament 2021 is located in the United States	Capacity: 10,506	Capacity: 11,519	Capacity: 3,700
The Basketball Tournament 2021 is located in the United States	Peoria	Dayton	Regional sites Championship site
The Basketball Tournament 2021 is located in the United States	Peoria Civic Center	University of Dayton Arena	Regional sites Championship site
The Basketball Tournament 2021 is located in the United States	Capacity: 11,433	Capacity: 13,435	Regional sites Championship site

== Teams ==
Key: Alumni team representing a specific college basketball program

Wichita Regional
Seed	Team	App. (Last)	Affiliation	Origin of name
1	Eberlein Drive	6th (2020)		Team owners' home street
2	AfterShocks	2nd (2019)	Wichita State	Team nickname "Shockers"
3	Challenge ALS	5th (2020)		ALS awareness
4	LA Cheaters	2nd (2019)	Drew League	
5	Florida TNT	2nd (2019)		Former college players from the state of Florida
6	Team Arkansas	3rd (2019)	Arkansas	
7	Purple & Black	5th (2019)	Kansas State	Kansas State school colors
8	The Enchantment	1st	New Mexico	State nickname "Land of Enchantment"
9	Stillwater Stars	2nd (2020)	Oklahoma State	School location in Stillwater, OK
10	Omaha Blue Crew	1st	Creighton	School location in Omaha, NE and primary color
11	Fort Worth Funk	1st	TCU	School location in Fort Worth, TX
12	Kimchi Express	4th (2018)		
13	Mental Toughness	1st	JCK Foundation	Mental health awareness
14	We Are D3	3rd (2019)	NCAA Division III	
15	Ex-Pats	1st	Patriot League	Former Patriot League players
16	NG Saints	1st	Neumann Goretti HS	

Illinois Regional
Seed	Team	App. (Last)	Affiliation	Origin of name
1	Golden Eagles	6th (2020)	Marquette	Team nickname "Golden Eagles"
2	House of 'Paign	2nd (2020)	Illinois	School location in Champaign, IL
3	Boeheim's Army	7th (2020)	Syracuse	Syracuse head coach Jim Boeheim
4	Always Us	1st	Oregon	Phrase used by Dana Altman
5	Autism Army	1st		Autism awareness
6	The OverLooked	1st	Murray State	
7	Always a Brave	4th (2018)	Bradley	Team nickname "Braves"
8	Brotherly Love	3rd (2020)		Nickname for Philadelphia
9	Playing for Jimmy V	2nd (2019)	V Foundation	Nickname of Jim Valvano
10	Illinois Hoopville Warriors	1st		independent regional team rooted deeply in Chicago basketball culture
11	Heartfire	2nd (2020)		
12	SCD Hoops	1st		Sickle cell disease awareness
13	Peoria All-Stars	5th (2020)		Players with connections to Peoria, IL
14	Forces of Seoul	1st		Players with pro experience in South Korea
15	Jackson TN Underdawgs	5th (2019)		Players with connections to Jackson, TN
16	B1 Ballers	1st		

West Virginia Regional
Seed	Team	App. (Last)	Affiliation	Origin of name
1	Sideline Cancer	8th (2020)		Cancer awareness
2	Best Virginia	2nd (2019)	West Virginia	
3	Herd That	2nd (2020)	Marshall	Team nickname "Thundering Herd"
4	Armored Athlete	7th (2020)		
5	War Ready	2nd (2020)	Auburn	School battle cry "War Eagle"
6	Team 23	6th (2019)		Uniform number worn by Michael Jordan
7	D2	3rd (2020)	NCAA Division II	
8	PrimeTime Players	7th (2020)		
9	Fort Wayne Champs	6th (2019)		Players with connections to Fort Wayne, IN
10	Bleed Virginia	1st		Former mid-major players from Virginia
11	Georgia Kingz	1st		Former college players from Georgia
12	Bucketneers	1st	East Tennessee State	Team nickname "Buccaneers"
13	HBCUnited	1st	HBCUs	
14	Team DRC	3rd (2019)		Team sponsor Dominique Rodgers-Cromartie
15	WoCo Showtime	7th (2019)	Wofford	Abbreviation of Wofford College
16	Founding Fathers	1st	James Madison	School namesake and founding father James Madison

Columbus Regional
Seed	Team	App. (Last)	Affiliation	Origin of name
1	Carmen's Crew	5th (2020)	Ohio State	School song "Carmen Ohio"
2	Red Scare	3rd (2020)	Dayton	Name given to student section
3	Zip 'Em Up	1st	Xavier	Former Xavier team motto
4	Team Hines	3rd (2020)		Team player Kyle Hines
5	The Money Team	2nd (2020)		Team sponsor Floyd "Money" Mayweather
6	Blue Collar U	1st	Buffalo	Buffalo team color, plus city's blue-collar image
7	Wolf Blood	1st	NC State	Team nickname "Wolfpack"
8	Men of Mackey	2nd (2020)	Purdue	Purdue home court Mackey Arena
9	Ballinteers	1st	Tennessee	Team nickname "Volunteers"
10	Category 5	1st	Miami (FL)	Team name "Hurricanes" and Saffir–Simpson scale
11	The Nerd Team	1st		Players from "more prestigious" universities
12	The Region	5th (2019)		Players from Northwest Indiana, locally called "The Region"
13	Brown & White	1st	St. Bonaventure	St. Bonaventure team colors
14	Ohio 1804	1st	Ohio	Year of Ohio University founding
15	BC Vahakni City	1st	BC Vahakni City	VBET A-League team of the same name
16	Mid-American Unity	3rd (2019)	MAC	

== Tournament bracket ==
=== Wichita Regional ===
First round July 16–17
1	Eberlein Drive	86
16	NG Saints	68
8	The Enchantment	83
9	Stillwater Stars	84
5	Florida TNT	83
12	Kimchi Express	59
4	LA Cheaters	76
13	Mental Toughness	73
6	Team Arkansas	74
11	Fort Worth Funk	70
3	Challenge ALS	67
14	We Are D3	60
7	Purple & Black	59
10	Omaha Blue Crew	60
2	AfterShocks	60
15	Ex-Pats	53

Second Round; July 18
1	Eberlein Drive	119
9	Stillwater Stars	67
5	Florida TNT	92
4	LA Cheaters	85
6	Team Arkansas	63
3	Challenge ALS	69
10	Omaha Blue Crew	73
2	AfterShocks	76

Regional semifinals July 20
1	Eberlein Drive	67
5	Florida TNT	74
3	Challenge ALS	65
2	AfterShocks	69

Regional final July 31 (Dayton); 12:00 p.m. / ESPN
5	Florida TNT	92
2	AfterShocks	63

=== West Virginia Regional ===
First round July 17–18
1	Sideline Cancer	80
16	Founding Fathers	77
8	PrimeTime Players	61
9	Fort Wayne Champs	72
5	War Ready	50
12	Bucketneers	77
4	Armored Athlete	88
13	HBCUnited	52
6	Team 23	91
11	Georgia Kingz	64
3	Herd That	85
14	Team DRC	76
7	D2	68
10	Bleed Virginia	56
2	Best Virginia	70
15	WoCo Showtime	67

Second Round; July 19
1	Sideline Cancer	92
9	Fort Wayne Champs	71
12	Bucketneers	79
4	Armored Athlete	60
6	Team 23	74
3	Herd That	71
7	D2	51
2	Best Virginia	63

Regional semifinals July 21
1	Sideline Cancer	58
12	Bucketneers	57
6	Team 23	75
2	Best Virginia	67

Regional final July 31 (Dayton); 7:00 p.m. / ESPN2
1	Sideline Cancer	71
6	Team 23	78

=== Columbus Regional ===
First round July 23–24
1	Carmen's Crew	77
16	Mid-American Unity	65
8	Men of Mackey	83
9	Ballinteers	74
5	The Money Team	86
12	The Region	71
4	Team Hines	67
13	Brown & White	56
6	Blue Collar U	88
11	The Nerd Team	82
3	Zip 'Em Up	91
14	Ohio 1804	67
7	Wolf Blood	65
10	Category 5	74
2	Red Scare	88
15	BC Vahakni City	44

Second Round; July 25
1	Carmen's Crew	80
8	Men of Mackey	69
5	The Money Team	93
4	Team Hines	76
6	Blue Collar U	93
3	Zip 'Em Up	83
10	Category 5	76
2	Red Scare	69

Regional semifinals July 27
1	Carmen's Crew	89
5	The Money Team	91
6	Blue Collar U	78
10	Category 5	61

Regional final July 31 (Dayton); 9:00 p.m. / ESPN2
5	The Money Team	81
6	Blue Collar U	84

=== Illinois Regional ===
First round July 24–25
1	Golden Eagles	94
16	B1 Ballers	66
8	Brotherly Love	46
9	Playing for Jimmy V	78
5	Autism Army	76
12	SCD Hoops	48
4	Always Us	79
13	Peoria All-Stars	73
6	The OverLooked	56
11	Heartfire	67
3	Boeheim's Army	65
14	Forces of Seoul	53
7	Always a Brave	75
10	Illinois Hoopville Warriors	73
2	House of 'Paign	58
15	Jackson TN Underdawgs	64

Second Round; July 26
1	Golden Eagles	71
9	Playing for Jimmy V	64
5	Autism Army	76
4	Always Us	71
11	Heartfire	62
3	Boeheim's Army	68
7	Always a Brave	70
15	Jackson TN Underdawgs	50

Regional semifinals July 28
1	Golden Eagles	88
5	Autism Army	75
3	Boeheim's Army	69
7	Always a Brave	54

Regional final July 31 (Dayton); 2:00 p.m. / ESPN
1	Golden Eagles	69
3	Boeheim's Army	73

=== Semifinals and championship ===
Television coverage via ESPN.

Semifinals; August 1 (Dayton); 12:00 p.m. / 2:30 p.m.
KS 5	Florida TNT	64
IL 3	Boeheim's Army	66
OH 6	Blue Collar U	62
WV 6	Team 23	78

Championship; August 3 (Dayton); 9:00 p.m.
IL 3	Boeheim's Army	69
WV 6	Team 23	67

==== Semifinals ====
ESPN

August 1, 2021
12:00 p.m. EDT

Stats

IL 3 Boeheim's Army 66, KS 5 Florida TNT 64
Scoring by quarter: 13–19, 20–15, 9–13, 24–17
Pts: T. Rice 24; Rebs: C. McCullough 7 Asts: T. Rice 7	Pts: K. Clanton 18; Rebs: K. Clanton 16; Asts: D. Jones 5

UD Arena
Dayton, Ohio
Referees: K. Kimble, R. Natili, T. Morrissey

ESPN

August 1, 2021
2:30 p.m. EDT

Stats

WV 6 Team 23 78, OH 6 Blue Collar U 62
Scoring by quarter: 19–17, 15–14, 17–17, 27–14
Pts: W. Lemon & E. Griffin 15; Rebs: R. Putney 9 Asts: W. Lemon 4	Pts: L. Bearden 22; Rebs: C. Massinburg 8 Asts: L. Bearden 3

UD Arena
Dayton, Ohio
Referees: J. Anderson, E. Walton, B. O'Connell

==== Championship ====
ESPN

August 3, 2021
9:00 p.m. EDT

Stats, ESPN, SI

IL 3 Boeheim's Army 69, WV 6 Team 23 67
Scoring by quarter: 18–17, 15–15, 17–22, 19–13
Pts: K. Sykes 21; Rebs: C. McCullough 9 Asts: T. Rice/D. Kennedy/K. Sykes 2	Pts: E. Griffin 16; Rebs: E. Griffin 7 Asts: E. Washington 4

UD Arena
Dayton, Ohio
Referees: J. Anderson, K. Kimble, E. Walton

== Awards ==
All Tournament Team
Pos	Player	Team
PG	Tyrese Rice (MVP)	Boeheim's Army
PG	Marcus Keene	Sideline Cancer
PF	Raphiael Putney	Team 23
SG	Dominique Jones	Florida TNT
C	Nick Perkins	Blue Collar U
GM	Kevin Belbey	Boeheim's Army
Coach	Marc Hughes	Team 23
