= The Basketball Tournament 2016 =

The Basketball Tournament
- 2016

Tournament information
- Dates: July 9–August 2, 2016
- Tournament format(s): Single elimination
- Host(s): (California) Los Angeles, CA; (North Carolina) Charlotte, NC; (Illinois) Chicago, IL; (Pennsylvania) Philadelphia, PA; (New York (state)) New York, NY
- Participants: 64
- Purse: $2,000,000 winner-take-all

Final positions
- Champions: Overseas Elite
- Runner-up: Team Colorado

Tournament statistics
- MVP: Kyle Fogg
- Top scorer(s): Kyle Fogg (131 pts)
- Games played: 63

The Basketball Tournament 2016 was the third edition of The Basketball Tournament, a 5-on-5, single elimination basketball tournament. The tournament involved 64 teams; it started on July 9 and continued through August 2, 2016. The winner of the final, Overseas Elite, received a two million dollar prize. The semifinals were broadcast on ESPN2, and the championship game—played at Rose Hill Gymnasium at Fordham University in The Bronx—was broadcast on ESPN.

== Format ==
The tournament field consisted of 64 teams, organized into four regions of 16 teams each. The sixteen teams in each region were eleven teams selected by fans via the tournament's website, three teams selected at-large, the defending regional winner from the 2015 tournament, and the team that raised the most money for Big Brothers Big Sisters of America via GoFundMe.

2015 Regional winners
Region	Team
Northeast	Team City of Gods
Midwest	Ants Alumni
South	Overseas Elite
West	Team 23

The winning team (its players, coaches, general manager, and boosters) received 90% of the $2 million prize, while the remaining 10% was split amongst the team's top 100 fans (based on points earned online).

== Venues ==
The Basketball Tournament 2016 took place in five locations.

Round	Dates	Region	Location
Regional	July 9–10	West	Los Angeles, California
Regional	July 9–10	South	Charlotte, North Carolina
Regional	July 16–17	Midwest	Chicago, Illinois
Regional	July 16–17	Northeast	Philadelphia, Pennsylvania
Super 16	July 21–22		Philadelphia, Pennsylvania
Quarterfinals	July 23		Philadelphia, Pennsylvania
Semifinals	July 30		New York City
Finals	August 2		New York City

== Alumni Teams ==
Multiple teams in the tournament were composed mostly or exclusively of alumni of a particular school, including those listed here.

Team	School
Purple & Black	Kansas State Wildcats
Ram Nation	VCU Rams
Few Good Men	Gonzaga Bulldogs
Team Utah	Utah Utes
Team Colorado	Colorado Buffaloes
Bluff City Blues	Memphis Tigers
Always a Brave	Bradley Braves
Bluegrass Boys	Kentucky Wildcats
Golden Eagles Alumni	Marquette Golden Eagles
Untouchables	Pittsburgh Panthers
PA Roadwarriors	Bucknell Bison
Boeheim's Army	Syracuse Orange
Spartan Heroes	Michigan State Spartans
Skinner's Frate Train	Boston College Eagles

== Bracket ==
Regional finals
Region	Winner	Score	Loser
Northeast	Team City of Gods	86–79	The Untouchables
South	Overseas Elite	74–66	Trained to Go
Midwest	Always a Brave	89–81	Golden Eagles Alumni
West	Team Colorado	83–78	Team Utah

=== Semifinals & final ===
Semifinals; July 30; New York City
NE1	Team City of Gods	92
S2	Overseas Elite	103
MW9	Always a Brave	70
W5	Team Colorado	78

Final; August 2 New York City
S2	Overseas Elite	77
W5	Team Colorado	72

==== National Championship ====
ESPN

August 2, 2016
7:00 PM EDT

Report

S #2 Overseas Elite 77, W #5 Team Colorado 72
Scoring by half: 36–46, 41–26
Pts: Kennedy – 18; Rebs: Kennedy – 8	Pts: Hall – 24; Rebs: Dufault – 6

Rose Hill Gymnasium
The Bronx, New York

== Awards ==
All Tournament Team
Pos	Player	Team	PPG
G	Dwight Buycks	Golden Eagles Alumni	24.5
G	Marcus Hall	Team Colorado	24.0
G	Kyle Fogg (MVP)	Overseas Elite	22.8
F	Marcellus Sommerville	Always A Brave	21.2
F	D. J. Kennedy	Overseas Elite	19.6
