= Team City of Gods =

- Leagues: The Basketball Tournament
- Founded: 2015
- History: Team City of Gods (2015–2017)
- Location: Baltimore, Maryland
- Team colors: Red and Navy Blue
- General manager: Lafonte Johnson
- Head coach: Joe Connelly III
- Website: Team page
Home	Away

Team City of Gods was an American basketball team that has participated in The Basketball Tournament (TBT), a winner-take-all single-elimination tournament. The team advanced to the TBT 2015 semifinals, beating tournament favorite Boeheim's Army, before falling to eventual tournament champions Overseas Elite.

The team played in the Northeast Region of the tournament in 2015, their first year of existence. The team was coached by Joe Connelly III, a former player development coach for the Washington Wizards based in Baltimore, Maryland. City of Gods was managed by former George Washington basketball player Lafonte Johnson. The team featured five players with experience in the National Basketball Association (NBA).

== History ==
Team City of Gods was founded in 2015, primarily by Joe Connelly III, who had previously worked as the development coach for the Washington Wizards of the National Basketball Association. Connelly, currently a professional basketball trainer based in his hometown of Baltimore, Maryland, has experience coaching public school teams, at recreation centers, and in the Amateur Athletic Union. He is the older brother of both Denver Nuggets general manager Tim Connelly and Phoenix Suns assistant general manager Tim Connelly.

Connelly chose the team's players primarily because he had connections with each of them. One player, Michael Sweetney, said that "Joe Connelly pretty much put the whole team together". Connelly and general manager Lafonte Johnson, a former college basketball player for UNLV and George Washington, helped gain fans by campaigning on Twitter and other social media websites. Joe Connelly came up with the team name, using a popular Baltimore clothing brand. Connelly also liked how the name of the clothing brand sounded like reaching for greatness and being great. The name helped make the team more popular, which helped gain support and votes in order to enter the basketball tournament and a chance to win $1 million dollars.

=== Team name and local identity ===
The team's name was conceived by head coach Joe Connelly III, who adapted it from a popular local Baltimore clothing brand. According to Connelly, the phrase resonated with him because it evoked the concepts of "reaching for greatness and being great." To secure entry into the tournament's $1 million single-elimination bracket, which required team selection backed by public fan support, Connelly and general manager Lafonte Johnson aggressively campaigned across digital platforms, heavily utilizing Twitter to mobilize regional fan voting.

== Logo and uniforms ==
Logo, 2015–2017

Uniforms, 2015–2017

== Players ==
Note: Flags indicate national team eligibility at FIBA-sanctioned events. Players may hold other non-FIBA nationalities not displayed.

Team City of Gods roster
Players
Coaches

Pos.	No.	Nat.	Name	Ht.	Wt.	Age
SG	1	(United States)	Sweetney, Devin	6 ft 5 in (1.96 m)	200 lb (91 kg)	38 – 23 October 1987
PG	5	(United States)	Goss, Phil	6 ft 2 in (1.88 m)	187 lb (85 kg)	43 – 7 April 1983
SG	13	(United States)	Silas, Xavier	6 ft 5 in (1.96 m)	205 lb (93 kg)	38 – 22 January 1988
PF	14	(United States)	Gist, James	6 ft 9 in (2.06 m)	235 lb (107 kg)	39 – 26 October 1986
SG	20	(United States)	Kromah, Lasan	6 ft 6 in (1.98 m)	207 lb (94 kg)	34 – 24 June 1991
PF	21	(United Kingdom)	Mensah-Bonsu, Pops	6 ft 9 in (2.06 m)	235 lb (107 kg)	42 – 7 September 1983
PG	22	(United States)	Strong, Omar	5 ft 9 in (1.75 m)	162 lb (73 kg)	36 – 16 May 1990
SF	22	(United States)	Smith, Roscoe	6 ft 8 in (2.03 m)	205 lb (93 kg)	35 – 1 May 1991
SG	34	(United States)	Hawkins, David	6 ft 4 in (1.93 m)	225 lb (102 kg)	43 – 28 October 1982
SF	35	(United States)	Johnson, DerMarr	6 ft 9 in (2.06 m)	209 lb (95 kg)	46 – 5 May 1980
C	50	(United States)	Sweetney, Michael	6 ft 8 in (2.03 m)	295 lb (134 kg)	43 – 25 October 1982
C	55	(Senegal)	N'Diaye, Hamady	7 ft 0 in (2.13 m)	236 lb (107 kg)	39 – 12 January 1987

Head coach

- (United States) Joe Connelly III

Assistant coach(es)

- (United States) Evan Monroe

Team manager

- (United States) Lafonte Johnson

Legend

- (C) Team captain
- Injured

- Roster
Updated: July 28, 2015
