= The Basketball Tournament 2017 =

Single elimination basketball tournament

The Basketball Tournament
- 2017

Tournament information
- Dates: July 8–August 3, 2017
- Tournament format: Single elimination
- Hosts: (Pennsylvania) Philadelphia, PA; (North Carolina) Charlotte, NC; (Nevada) Las Vegas, NV; (Illinois) Peoria, IL; (New York (state)) New York, NY; (Maryland) Baltimore, MD
- Participants: 64
- Purse: $2,000,000 winner-take-all

Final positions
- Champions: Overseas Elite
- Runner-up: Team Challenge ALS

Tournament statistics
- MVP: Kyle Fogg
- Top scorer: Casper Ware (113 pts)
- Games played: 63

The Basketball Tournament 2017 was the fourth edition of The Basketball Tournament, a 5-on-5, single elimination basketball tournament broadcast by the ESPN family of networks. The tournament involved 64 teams; it started on July 8 and continued through August 3, 2017. The winner of the final, Overseas Elite, received a two million dollar prize.

== Format ==
The main tournament field consisted of 64 teams, organized into four regions of 16 teams each. The sixteen teams in each region were nine teams selected by fans via the tournament's website, six teams selected at-large, and one team selected via a play-in "Jamboree". The Jamboree consisted of 16 teams, each of which paid a $5000 entry fee. After two rounds of play, the surviving four teams advanced to the main field of 64 (one per region), and were refunded their entry fees. Jamboree games used an experimental "Mensa Rules" ending, now known as the Elam Ending.

The winning team (its players, coaches, general manager, and boosters) received 90% of the $2 million prize, while the remaining 10% was split amongst the team's top 100 fans (based on points earned online).

== Venues ==
The Basketball Tournament 2017 took place in six locations; all play-in ("Jamboree") games were held in Philadelphia.

Round	Dates	Region	Location	Broadcast
Play-in	June 17–18		Philadelphia, Pennsylvania	
Regional	July 8–9	Northeast	Philadelphia, Pennsylvania	ESPN3
Regional	July 8–9	South	Charlotte, North Carolina	ESPN3
Regional	July 15–16	West	Las Vegas, Nevada	ESPN3
Regional	July 15–16	Midwest	Peoria, Illinois	ESPN3
Super 16	July 20–22		Brooklyn	ESPN & ESPN2
Quarterfinals	July 23		Brooklyn	ESPN & ESPN2
Semifinals	August 1		Baltimore	ESPN
Finals	August 3		Baltimore	ESPN

Red dots mark regional locations, the blue dot marks the Super 16 location, and the green dot marks the semifinal and finals location.

The Basketball Tournament 2017 (the United States)

== Alumni Teams ==
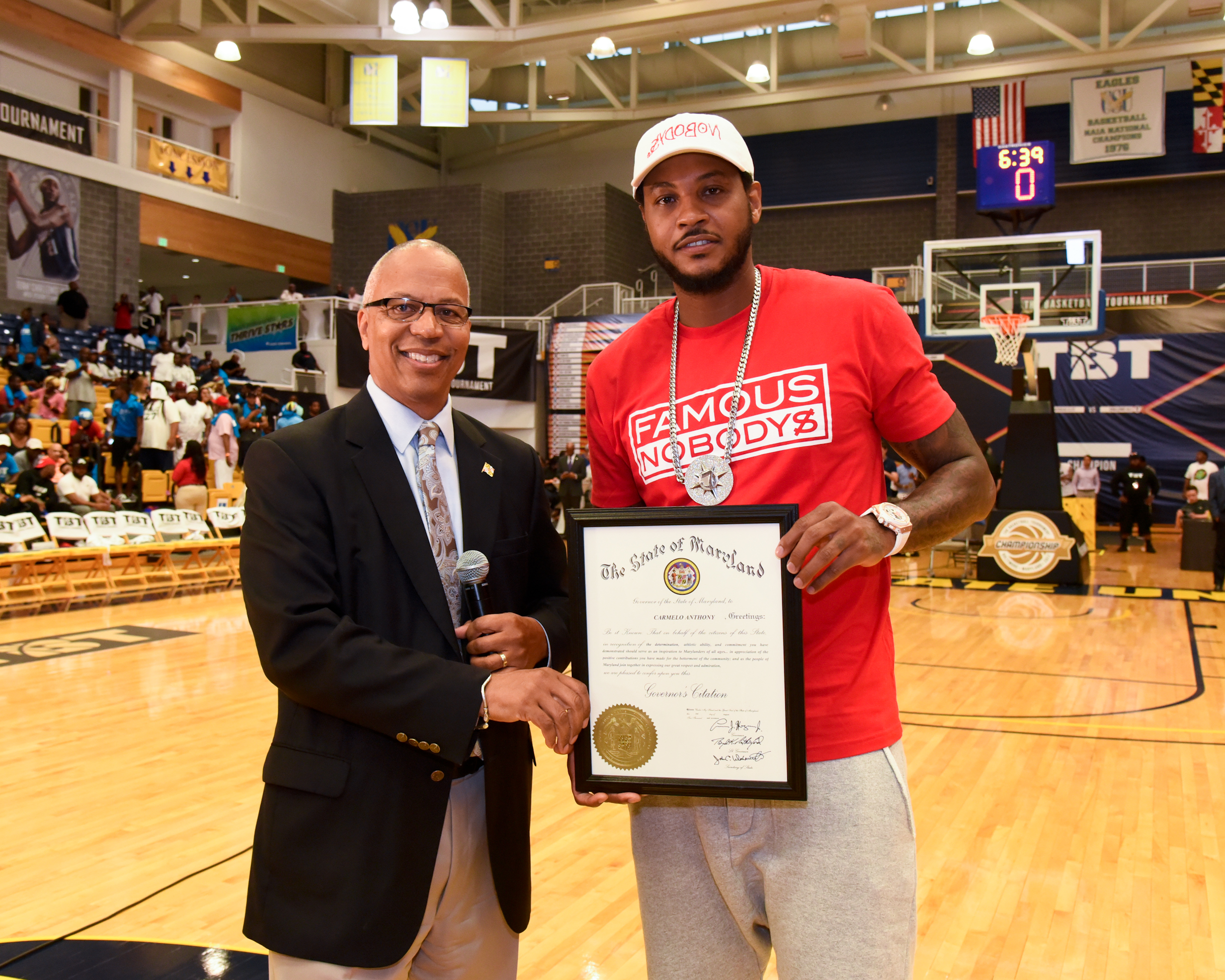
Boyd Rutherford, the Lieutenant Governor of Maryland, with Carmelo Anthony (at right) during the tournament. Anthony acted as host for the tournament in Baltimore, where he played high school basketball.

Multiple teams in the tournament were composed mostly or exclusively of alumni of a particular school. These teams are listed below.

Region	Seed	Team	School
Northeast	2	Supernova	Villanova Wildcats
Northeast	3	Boeheim's Army	Syracuse Orange
Northeast	5	Zoo Crew	Pittsburgh Panthers
Northeast	10	Rebel Riders	Rider Broncs
Northeast	11	Gaelnation	Iona Gaels
Midwest	1	Golden Eagles	Marquette Golden Eagles
Midwest	2	Scarlet & Gray	Ohio State Buckeyes
Midwest	3	Always a Brave	Bradley Braves
Midwest	4	Purple and Black	Kansas State Wildcats
Midwest	5	Hilton Magic Legends	Iowa State Cyclones
Midwest	7	Banner Boys	Milwaukee Panthers
Midwest	8	Majerus SLU Crew	Saint Louis Billikens
South	2	Ram Nation	VCU Rams
South	3	Ole Hotty Toddy	Ole Miss Rebels
South	5	Tampa Bulls	South Florida Bulls
South	7	Blue Zoo	Middle Tennessee Blue Raiders
South	8	Matadors	Texas Tech Red Raiders
West	1	Team Colorado	Colorado Buffaloes
West	2	Few Good Men	Gonzaga Bulldogs
West	7	Team Utah	Utah Utes
West	11	The Wasatch Front	Weber State Wildcats
West	14	Air Force Bomb Squad	Air Force Falcons

== Bracket ==
All times Eastern.

=== Northeast Region – Philadelphia, PA ===
First round July 8 Philadelphia
1	FCM Untouchables	92
16	OPI	77
8	Talladega Knights	74
9	Paul Champions	78
5	Zoo Crew	87
12	Sideline Cancer	100
4	Team Foe	80
13	DC on Point	75
6	Team City of Gods	86
11	Gaelnation	88
3	Boeheim's Army	99
14	Dubois Dream	66
7	Team Fancy Ryu	78
10	Rebel Riders	70
2	Supernova	97
15	South Jamaica Kings	72

Second Round; July 9 Philadelphia
1	FCM Untouchables	91
9	Paul Champions	57
12	Sideline Cancer	75
4	Team Foe	82
11	Gaelnation	100
3	Boeheim's Army	106
7	Team Fancy Ryu	82
2	Supernova	74

Regional semifinals July 20; Brooklyn
1	FCM Untouchables	71
4	Team Foe	85
3	Boeheim's Army	65
7	Team Fancy Ryu	61

Regional final July 23; Brooklyn
4	Team Foe	67
3	Boeheim's Army	72

==== Northeast Regional final ====
ESPN

July 23, 2017
2:00 PM EDT

Report

#4 Team Foe 67, #3 Boeheim's Army 72
Scoring by half: 40–24, 27–48
Pts: Kennedy – 18; Rebs: Kennedy – 14; Asts: Taylor – 6	Pts: Southerland – 23; Rebs: Southerland – 11; Asts: Triche – 6

Steinberg Center
Brooklyn, New York
Referees: Clarence Armstrong, Guy Pagano, Tim Edwards

=== Midwest Region – Peoria, IL ===
First round July 8 Peoria
1	Golden Eagles	103
16	Midwest Dream Squad	89
8	Majerus SLU Crew	91
9	HBC	87
5	Hilton Magic Legends	91
12	Illinois Hoopville Warriors	87
4	Purple and Black	79
13	Canton Bulldogs	70
6	Fort Wayne Champs	93
11	Peoria Allstars	76
3	Always a Brave	68
14	Mid American Unity	63
7	Banner Boys	61
10	Jackson TN Underdawgs	59
2	Scarlet & Gray	78
15	The Region	63

Second Round; July 9 Peoria
1	Golden Eagles	81
8	Majerus SLU Crew	70
5	Hilton Magic Legends	79
4	Purple and Black	90
6	Fort Wayne Champs	81
3	Always a Brave	92
7	Banner Boys	58
2	Scarlet & Gray	72

Regional semifinals July 22; Brooklyn
1	Golden Eagles	84
4	Purple and Black	77
3	Always a Brave	72
2	Scarlet & Gray	81

Regional final July 23; Brooklyn
1	Golden Eagles	56
2	Scarlet & Gray	81

==== Midwest Regional final ====
ESPN

July 23, 2017
12:00 PM EDT

Report

#1 Golden Eagles 56, #2 Scarlet & Gray 81
Scoring by half: 24–29, 32–52
Pts: Johnson-Odom – 15; Rebs: Wilson, Gardner – 8 Asts: Acker – 4	Pts: Lighty – 23; Rebs: Rodgers – 12; Asts: Craft – 8

Steinberg Center
Brooklyn, New York
Referees: Nate Farrell, Andy O'Brien, Mike Pearson

=== South Region – Charlotte, NC ===
First round July 8 Charlotte
1	Overseas Elite	84
16	Chattanooga Trenches	74
8	Matadors	76
9	Washington Generals	72
5	Tampa Bulls	94
12	Seven City Grain	88
4	Kentucky Kings	94
13	The Citi Team	74
6	Brothers Dat Ball	79
11	Golden Boot Dynasty	82
3	Ole Hotty Toddy	75
14	NC Prodigal Sons	84
7	Blue Zoo	77
10	PrimeTime Players	79
2	Ram Nation	82
15	Showtime	80

Second Round; July 9 Charlotte
1	Overseas Elite	78
8	Matadors	67
5	Tampa Bulls	88
4	Kentucky Kings	87
11	Golden Boot Dynasty	72
14	NC Prodigal Sons	74
10	PrimeTime Players	82
2	Ram Nation	96

Regional semifinals July 21; Brooklyn
1	Overseas Elite	84
5	Tampa Bulls	76
14	NC Prodigal Sons	64
2	Ram Nation	79

Regional final July 23; Brooklyn
1	Overseas Elite	86
2	Ram Nation	79

==== South Regional final ====
ESPN2

July 23, 2017
6:00 PM EDT

Report

#1 Overseas Elite 86, #2 Ram Nation 79
Scoring by half: 40–41, 46–38
Pts: Fogg – 26; Rebs: Kennedy – 10; Asts: Fogg – 4	Pts: Rozzell – 23; Rebs: Williams – 10; Asts: Maynor – 8

Steinberg Center
Brooklyn, New York

=== West Region – Las Vegas, NV ===
First round July 8 Las Vegas
1	Team Colorado	100
16	Kimchi Express	71
8	Trained to Go	95
9	Broad Street Brawlers	108
5	Team 23	107
12	Pedro's Posse	92
4	Armored Athlete	119
13	The Pearl 31's	74
6	Team Challenge ALS	97
11	The Wasatch Front	81
3	The Stickmen	105
14	Air Force Bomb Squad	63
7	Team Utah	100
10	Team Fredette	97
2	Few Good Men	89
15	Mostly Sports Delco	47

Second Round; July 9 Las Vegas
1	Team Colorado	111
9	Broad Street Brawlers	95
5	Team 23	77
4	Armored Athlete	84
6	Team Challenge ALS	87
3	The Stickmen	73
7	Team Utah	83
2	Few Good Men	85

Regional semifinals July 22; Brooklyn
1	Team Colorado	75
4	Armored Athlete	84
6	Team Challenge ALS	77
2	Few Good Men	60

Regional final July 23; Brooklyn
4	Armored Athlete	63
6	Team Challenge ALS	75

==== West Regional final ====
ESPN2

July 23, 2017
4:00 PM EDT

Report

#4 Armored Athlete 63, #6 Team Challenge ALS 75
Scoring by half: 28–36, 35–39
Pts: Gamble – 16; Rebs: Gamble – 9 Asts: Octeus, Sheehey – 2	Pts: Ware – 21; Rebs: Daye – 6 Asts: Ware, Daye – 3

Steinberg Center
Brooklyn, New York

=== National semifinals – Baltimore, MD ===
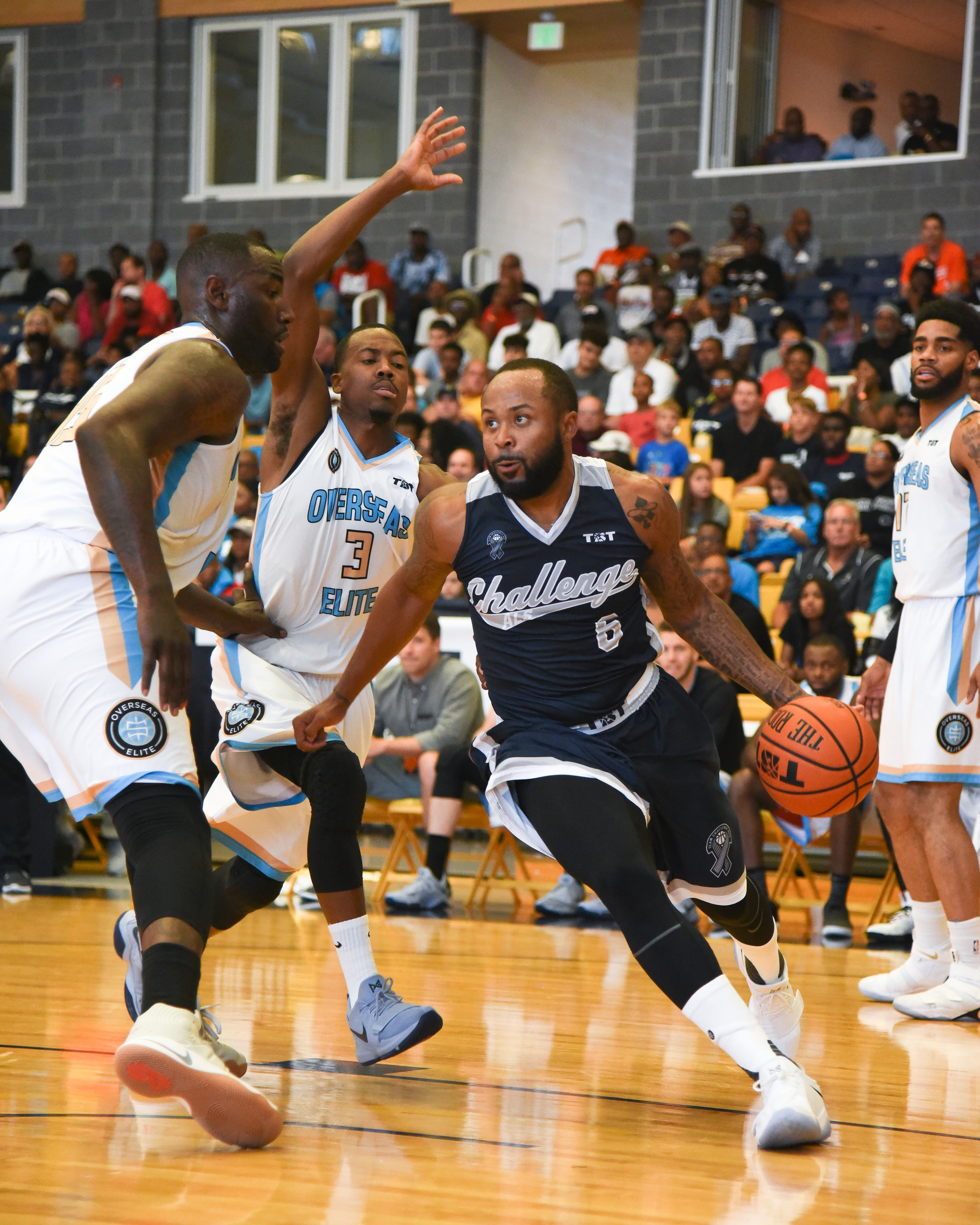
Title game action

Semifinals; August 1 Baltimore
NE3	Boeheim's Army	77
S1	Overseas Elite	81
MW2	Scarlet & Gray	83
W6	Team Challenge ALS	88

Final; August 3 Baltimore
S1	Overseas Elite	86
W6	Team Challenge ALS	83

==== Semifinals ====
ESPN

August 1, 2017
7:00 PM EDT

Report

NE #3 Boeheim's Army 77, S #1 Overseas Elite 81
Scoring by half: 40–44, 37–37
Pts: Devendorf – 24; Rebs: Fair – 7 Asts: Triche – 6	Pts: McCollum – 18; Rebs: Kennedy & Burrell – 6 Asts: Kennedy – 7

Physical Education Complex
Baltimore, Maryland
Referees: Clarence Armstrong, Earl Walton, Jeff Anderson

ESPN

August 1, 2017
9:00 PM EDT

Report

MW #2 Scarlet & Gray 83, W #6 Team Challenge ALS 88 ()
Scoring by half: 28–30, 39–37 Overtime: 11–11, 5–10
Pts: Sullinger – 26; Rebs: Sullinger & Rodgers – 10; Asts: Lighty – 6	Pts: Ware – 28; Rebs: Ware, Daye, Aska – 6 Asts: Ware – 4

Physical Education Complex
Baltimore, Maryland
Referees: Jamie Luckie, Mike Eades, Tony Chiazza

==== National championship ====
ESPN

August 3, 2017
7:00 PM EDT

Report

S #1 Overseas Elite 86, W #6 Team Challenge ALS 83
Scoring by half: 49–45, 37–38
Pts: Fogg – 29; Rebs: Kane – 7 Asts: Lafayette – 3	Pts: Ware – 22; Rebs: Daye – 8 Asts: Ware – 5

Physical Education Complex
Baltimore, Maryland
Attendance: 2465
Referees: Ed Corbett, Brian O'Connell, Jeff Clark

== Awards ==
All Tournament Team
Pos	Player	Team	PPG
F	Jared Sullinger	Scarlet & Gray	16.8
G	Casper Ware	Team Challenge ALS	18.8
G	Eric Devendorf	Boeheim's Army	19.2
F	D. J. Kennedy	Overseas Elite	15.0
G	Kyle Fogg (MVP)	Overseas Elite	17.8
GM†	Sean Marshall	Team Challenge ALS	18.3
Coach	Colin Curtin	Overseas Elite	—

† Marshall was both a player and the general manager for Team Challenge ALS
