= Colorado Buffaloes men's basketball statistical leaders =

The Colorado Buffaloes men's basketball statistical leaders are individual statistical leaders of the Colorado Buffaloes men's basketball program in various categories, including points, rebounds, assists, steals, and blocks. Within those areas, the lists identify single-game, single-season, and career leaders. As of the next college basketball season in 2024–25, the Buffaloes represent the University of Colorado Boulder in the NCAA Division I Big 12 Conference.

Colorado began competing in intercollegiate basketball in 1900. However, the school's record book does not generally list records from before the 1950s, as records from before this period are often incomplete and inconsistent. Since scoring was much lower in this era, and teams played much fewer games during a typical season, it is likely that few or no players from this era would appear on these lists anyway.

The NCAA did not officially record assists as a stat until the 1983–84 season, and blocks and steals until the 1985–86 season, but Colorado's record books includes players in these stats before these seasons. These lists are updated through the end of the 2020–21 season.

== Scoring ==
Career
Rk	Player	Points	Seasons
1	Cory Higgins	2001	2007–08 2008–09 2009–10 2010–11
	Richard Roby	2001	2004–05 2005–06 2006–07 2007–08
3	Donnie Boyce	1995	1991–92 1992–93 1993–94 1994–95
4	Cliff Meely	1940	1968–69 1969–70 1970–71
5	Shaun Vandiver	1876	1988–89 1989–90 1990–91
6	McKinley Wright IV	1857	2017–18 2018–19 2019–20 2020–21
7	Askia Booker	1740	2011–12 2012–13 2013–14 2014–15
8	Stevie Wise	1727	1987–88 1988–89 1989–90 1990–91
9	Josh Scott	1709	2012–13 2013–14 2014–15 2015–16
10	Emmett Lewis	1680	1975–76 1976–77 1977–78 1978–79

Season
Rk	Player	Points	Season
1	Alec Burks	779	2010–11
2	Cliff Meely	729	1970–71
3	KJ Simpson	728	2023–24
4	Shaun Vandiver	699	1990–91
5	Shaun Vandiver	668	1989–90
6	Cliff Meely	667	1968–69
7	Stevie Wise	655	1990–91
8	Derrick White	615	2016–17
9	Cory Higgins	610	2010–11
10	Scott Wilke	601	1987–88

Single game
Rk	Player	Points	Season	Opponent
1	Cliff Meely	47	1970–71	Oklahoma
2	Donnie Boyce	46	1993–94	Oklahoma State
3	Cliff Meely	44	1970–71	Oklahoma State
4	Askia Booker	43	2014–15	USC
	Cliff Meely	43	1970–71	Oklahoma
6	Jaquay Walls	42	1999–00	Iowa State
	Cliff Meely	42	1970–71	Iowa State
	Chuck Gardner	42	1965–66	Nebraska
9	Cliff Meely	40	1968–69	Iowa State
10	Jim Creighton	39	1971–72	Iowa State
	Chuck Gardner	39	1965–66	Kansas
	Art Bunte	39	1952–53	Oklahoma

== Rebounds ==
Career
Rk	Player	Rebounds	Seasons
1	Stephane Pelle	1054	1999–00 2000–01 2001–02 2002–03
2	Andre Roberson	1045	2010–11 2011–12 2012–13
3	Josh Scott	974	2012–13 2013–14 2014–15 2015–16
4	Cliff Meely	971	1968–69 1969–70 1970–71
5	Shaun Vandiver	962	1988–89 1989–90 1990–91
6	Wesley Gordon	882	2013–14 2014–15 2015–16 2016–17
7	Jim Davis	863	1961–62 1962–63 1963–64
8	Tyler Bey	800	2017–18 2018–19 2019–20
9	Vince Kelley	730	1980–81 1981–82 1982–83 1983–84
10	Burdette Haldorson	711	1951–52 1952–53 1953–54 1954–55

Season
Rk	Player	Rebounds	Season
1	Andre Roberson	401	2011–12
2	Tyler Bey	356	2018–19
3	Andre Roberson	347	2012–13
4	Burdette Haldorson	346	1954–55
5	Cliff Meely	337	1968–69
6	Shaun Vandiver	336	1989–90
7	Cliff Meely	332	1969–70
8	Shaun Vandiver	331	1990–91
9	Jim Davis	329	1962–63
10	Jim Davis	318	1963–64

Single game
Rk	Player	Rebounds	Season	Opponent
1	Burdette Haldorson	31	1952–53	Oklahoma
2	Roger Voss	27	1960–61	Missouri
3	Cliff Meely	25	1970–71	Oklahoma
4	Jamahl Mosley	22	2000–01	Missouri
	Jo Jo Hunter	22	1979–80	Iowa State
	Burdette Haldorson	22	1954–55	Nebraska
	Burdette Haldorson	22	1953–54	Oklahoma
8	Stephane Pelle	21	2002–03	Stetson
	Cliff Meely	21	1969–70	Iowa State
	Jim Davis	21	1963–64	Missouri
	Burdette Haldorson	21	1954–55	Oklahoma

== Assists ==
Career
Rk	Player	Assists	Seasons
1	McKinley Wright IV	683	2017–18 2018–19 2019–20 2020–21
2	Jay Humphries	562	1980–81 1981–82 1982–83 1983–84
3	Mike Reid	446	1982–83 1983–84 1984–85 1985–86
4	Jose Winston	440	1998–99 1999–00 2000–01
5	Marcus Hall	423	2003–04 2004–05 2005–06 2007–08
6	Toney Ellis	409	1976–77 1977–78 1978–79 1979–80
7	Nate Tomlinson	405	2008–09 2009–10 2010–11 2011–12
	Donnie Boyce	405	1991–92 1992–93 1993–94 1994–95
9	KJ Simpson	378	2021–22 2022–23 2023–24
10	Stevie Wise	377	1987–88 1988–89 1989–90 1990–91

Season
Rk	Player	Assists	Season
1	Jose Winston	194	2000–01
2	McKinley Wright IV	182	2020–21
3	KJ Simpson	181	2023–24
4	McKinley Wright IV	175	2017–18
5	Jay Humphries	174	1982–83
6	Jay Humphries	173	1983–84
7	Billy Law	170	1990–91
8	McKinley Wright IV	167	2018–19
	Mike Reid	167	1985–86
10	McKinley Wright IV	159	2019–20

Single game
Rk	Player	Assists	Season	Opponent
1	Jose Winston	15	2000–01	Coppin State
2	McKinley Wright IV	14	2020–21	USC
	Mike Reid	14	1985–86	Missouri
	Jay Humphries	14	1982–83	Oklahoma
5	McKinley Wright IV	13	2020–21	Georgetown
	Jose Winston	13	1998–99	Elon College
	Toney Ellis	13	1976–77	Iowa State
8	McKinley Wright IV	12	2020–21	California
	Askia Booker	12	2013–14	UCLA
	Jay Humphries	12	1982–83	Oklahoma

== Steals ==
Career
Rk	Player	Steals	Seasons
1	Jay Humphries	309	1980–81 1981–82 1982–83 1983–84
2	Donnie Boyce	245	1991–92 1992–93 1993–94 1994–95
3	Cory Higgins	192	2007–08 2008–09 2009–10 2010–11
4	Jose Winston	179	1998–99 1999–00 2000–01
	Stevie Wise	179	1987–88 1988–89 1989–90 1990–91
6	Richard Roby	176	2004–05 2005–06 2006–07 2007–08
7	Andre Roberson	164	2010–11 2011–12 2012–13
8	Askia Booker	155	2011–12 2012–13 2013–14 2014–15
9	Randy Robinson	143	1988–89 1990–91 1991–92 1992–93
10	Marcus Hall	140	2003–04 2004–05 2005–06 2007–08
	McKinley Wright IV	140	2017–18 2018–19 2019–20 2020–21

Season
Rk	Player	Steals	Season
1	Jay Humphries	115	1982–83
2	Jay Humphries	101	1983–84
3	Jose Winston	82	1999–00
4	Keith Higgins	72	1994–95
5	Stevie Wise	69	1990–91
6	Donnie Boyce	68	1991–92
7	Andre Roberson	67	2012–13
8	Donnie Boyce	66	1994–95
9	Chauncey Billups	63	1996–97
	Randy Robinson	63	1992–93

Single game
Rk	Player	Steals	Season	Opponent
1	Jay Humphries	10	1982–83	Wisconsin-Milwaukee
2	Marcus Hall	8	2007–08	Tulsa
	Jose Winston	8	1999–00	St. Mary’s
	Jose Winston	8	1998–99	Nebraska
	Keith Higgins	8	1994–95	Washington
	Randy Robinson	8	1991–92	Missouri
	Jay Humphries	8	1982–83	Oklahoma
	Jay Humphries	8	1983–84	Cal-Irvine
	Jay Humphries	8	1982–83	New Mexico State
10	Stevie Wise	7	1990–91	Texas-San Antonio
	Jay Humphries	7	1983–84	Kansas
	Jay Humphries	7	1983–84	Oklahoma
	Keith Higgins	7	1994–95	Hofstra

== Blocks ==
Career
Rk	Player	Blocks	Seasons
1	David Harrison	225	2001–02 2002–03 2003–04
2	Wesley Gordon	204	2013–14 2014–15 2015–16 2016–17
3	Josh Scott	162	2012–13 2013–14 2014–15 2015–16
4	Ted Allen	161	1992–93 1993–94 1994–95
5	Andre Roberson	150	2010–11 2011–12 2012–13
6	Poncho Hodges	131	1991–92 1992–93
7	Cliff Meely	123	1968–69 1969–70 1970–71
8	Donnie Boyce	114	1991–92 1992–93 1993–94 1994–95
9	Marcus King-Stockton	111	2004–05 2005–06 2006–07 2007–08
10	Tyler Bey	102	2017–18 2018–19 2019–20

Season
Rk	Player	Blocks	Season
1	David Harrison	106	2002–03
2	David Harrison	85	2003–04
3	Poncho Hodges	73	1991–92
4	Wesley Gordon	68	2015–16
5	Andre Roberson	67	2011–12
6	Poncho Hodges	58	1992–93
7	Joe Cooper	57	1980–81
8	Ted Allen	55	1993–94
9	Ted Allen	53	1992–93
10	Josh Scott	52	2015–16

Single game
Rk	Player	Blocks	Season	Opponent
1	David Harrison	11	2002–03	Nebraska
2	David Harrison	10	2002–03	Stetson
3	Bangot Dak	8	2024–25	Cincinnati
4	Wesley Gordon	7	2015–16	Nicholls
	Wesley Gordon	7	2014–15	UCLA
	Andre Roberson	7	2011–12	Oregon
	David Harrison	7	2003–04	Texas Tech
	David Harrison	7	2002–03	Michigan St.
	David Harrison	7	2002–03	Kansas State
	Ted Allen	7	1993–94	Martland-Eastern Shore
	Joe Cooper	7	1980–81	Adams State
