= Wilky Gilmore =

American basketball player (1940–1993)

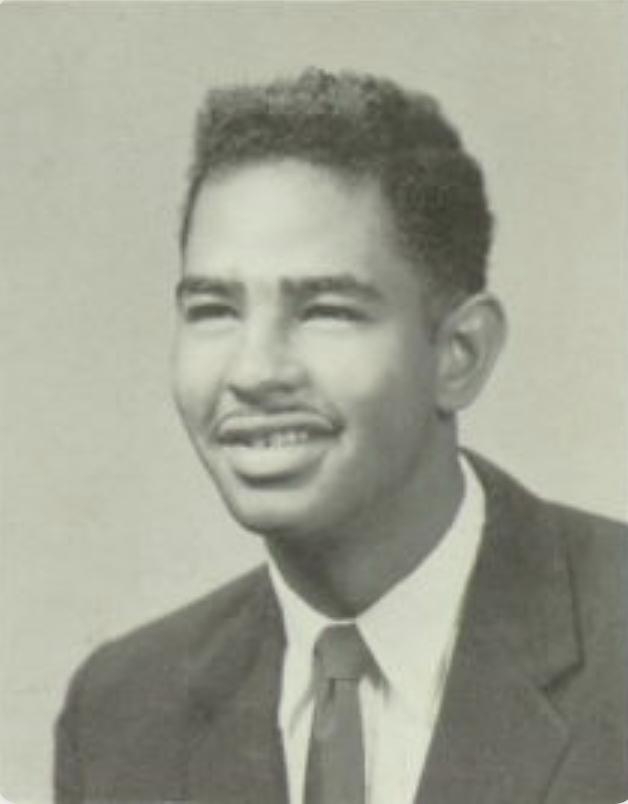

Personal information
- Born: March 11, 1940 Norwalk, Connecticut, U.S.
- Died: November 10, 1993 (aged 53) Del Mar, California, U.S.
- Listed weight: 215 lb (98 kg)

Career information
- High school: New Canaan High School (New Canaan, Connecticut)
- College: Colorado (1958–1962)
- NBA draft: 1962: 14th round, 98th overall pick
- Drafted by: St. Louis Hawks
- Position: Forward
- Number: 12

Career highlights
- 3× Connecticut All-State Selection (1956–1958); 3× Connecticut State-Tournament All Star Team Selection (1956–1958); Most Points Scored in Connecticut High-School Basketball History (1814 -- later exceeded by Calvin Murphy); 3× Big 8 All-Conference Selection (1960–1962); NCAA All-District Five Selection - Second Team (1961)
- Stats at Basketball Reference

Maurice Wilkens Gilmore (March 11, 1940 – November 10, 1993) was an American basketball player who played college basketball for the University of Colorado Buffaloes of the Big Eight Conference over the period 1959-62. After college graduation, Gilmore went on to become a certified public accountant and later a lawyer, while continuing his involvement in basketball through coaching, teaching, and mentoring young players. Gilmore was the first African American elected to the Town Council in New Canaan, Connecticut.

== Early years ==
Maurice Wilkens Gilmore, nicknamed "Wilky," was born on March 11, 1940, in Norwalk, Connecticut, and raised in New Canaan, Connecticut, the second of four children. Gilmore's parents were from Gaffney, South Carolina, and had migrated north during the 1930s. The Gilmore's were one of only a few African American families in predominantly white New Canaan during the 1940s and 1950s.

Wilky Gilmore's initial introduction to basketball is said to have come about as an outcome of a consultation between his mother and a child psychiatrist, who suggested that the young Gilmore needed an outlet for his energies and recommended getting him involved in athletics.

== High school career (New Canaan High School, Connecticut) ==
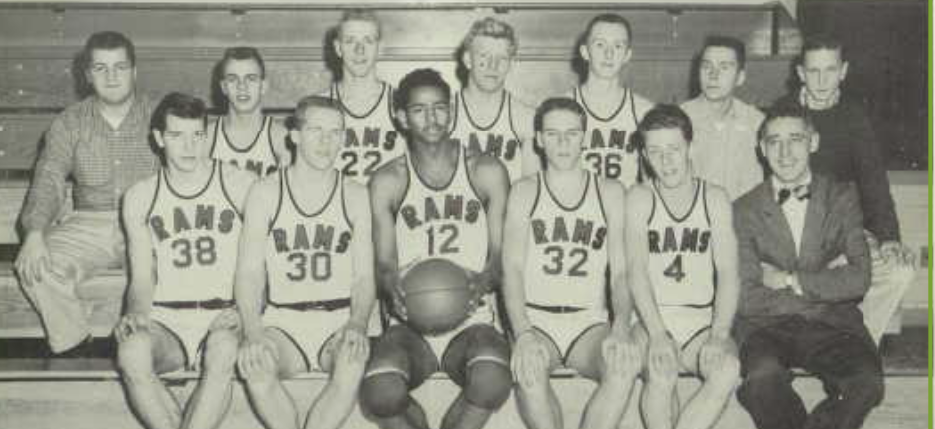
1957-58 New Canaan Rams High School Basketball Team - Wilky Gilmore in Center

During Wilky Gilmore's three years of varsity basketball at New Canaan High School (Connecticut) during the period 1955-58, the team won the Connecticut state championship three times, under three different basketball coaches – Loren Keyes, Joseph Sikorski, and William Murphy. The constant was the outstanding play of Wilky Gilmore. In the 1956 Connecticut State playoffs, Gilmore averaged 29 points per game; in 1957, he scored a record 136 points over the four games of the playoffs. In his final year of high-school basketball, 1957-58, Gilmore scored a school record 697 points over the course of the season, and led his team to a third state title.

At the conclusion of the 1955-56 season, when New Canaan won the Class C Connecticut State Basketball Tournament, with Gilmore as a sophomore, it represented the school's first state championship since 1934. New Canaan beat Watertown, Old Saybrook, Hand High School (Madison, CT), and Putnam, in the championship game, by an average margin of 26 points. Gilmore was named the tournament Most Valuable Player. His 115 points in the tournament brought his season total to 486, setting a New Canaan record.

Over the course of his three seasons of varsity play at New Canaan, Gilmore scored 1,814 points, to set both school and state records. The state record was later exceeded by the great guard Calvin Murphy of Norwalk, Connecticut.

In a testament to what a dominant force he was in high-school basketball, as explained by former New Canaan High School baseball coach Mark Rearick, "In 1958 the first game we played [rival high school] Darien, and we beat them by 30. The second game, Wilky was sick and missed it and they beat us by 30. That's the difference Wilky made in our team. A 60-point swing is just about right."

In addition to his athletic accomplishments, Wilky Gilmore was an excellent and active student at New Canaan High School. He participated in the choraleers club, student council (serving as vice-president his sophomore year and president as a senior), and the high-school math club.

== College career (University of Colorado) ==
Given his accomplishments as a high-school basketball player, Gilmore was heavily recruited by college basketball programs across the country. While his family had hoped that Gilmore would attend the nearby University of Connecticut and play his college basketball there, he opted for the University of Colorado. During the 1950s, the University of Colorado belonged to the Big Eight Conference, which, with players like Wilt Chamberlain and Bill Bridges at Kansas, was the strongest NCAA conference during those years.

Wilky Gilmore matriculated at the University of Colorado, Boulder in the fall of 1958. From 1959 to 1962, he played for three years on the varsity Colorado Buffaloes team. On March 17, 1962, Colorado defeated Kansas 63-59 to win the Big Eight title for the 1961-62 season. Gilmore and teammate Ken Charlton were named to the All-Big Eight all-star team, the second time that the University of Colorado had placed two players on the All-Big Eight team. At the conclusion of the 1961-62 season, the Colorado Buffaloes defeated Texas Tech in the Midwest Regionals of the NCAA basketball tournament, before falling to the University of Cincinnati, the defending national champions, who were led by Oscar Robertson.

In his first year playing for the University of Colorado varsity team, 1959-60, Wilky Gilmore, who stood 6'6", started at forward. He led Colorado in both scoring and rebounding, and was named to the All-Big Eight first team. Colorado finished the year with a 14-10 record.

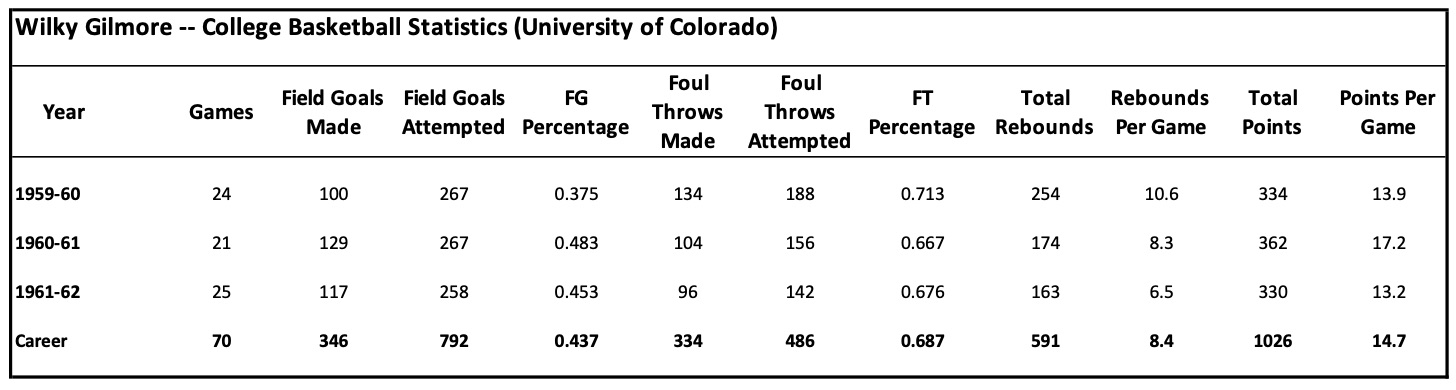
Wilky Gilmore -- Basketball Statistics at the University of Colorado (1959-1962)

Over the 1960-61 season, despite suffering a mid-season knee injury that would reduce his mobility throughout the remainder of his playing career, Gilmore continued to excel, averaging 17.2 points and 8.3 rebounds per game. Colorado finished with a 15-10 record, and Gilmore was named to the second-team all-star squad for the NCAA's District Five.

During his three seasons with the varsity team at the University of Colorado, Wilky Gilmore played for Coach Russell "Sox" Walseth, who coached the Buffaloes from 1956 – 1976. Over his 20-year tenure, Walseth became the winningest coach in the history of University of Colorado men's basketball, and remains one of the few coaches to have led both the men's and the women's teams at the same NCAA institution.

During the 1950s and early-1960s, the NCAA did not systematically track assists, which in modern-day basketball are considered a key statistics and measure of contributions to one's team. However, it is reported that Gilmore was a skillful and selfless passer, who placed his team above his own scoring totals. As coach Walseth put it, "He's invaluable to us whether or not he scores a single point. His team spirit is terrific. He wants us to have a good team, not just for himself to have a good season."

At the time of his graduation in 1962, with 1,026 total points scored over three seasons, Wilky Gilmore was the second-highest scorer in Colorado Buffaloes team history. Despite his many accomplishments in his three years of varsity basketball with the Buffaloes, Gilmore's play was definitely affected in his last season and a half by the nagging effects of his knee injury: As a Sports Illustrated in December 1961 article put it, "Much of Colorado's substantial hope rests on the slow-healing knee of fast Wilky Gilmore, the team's best shot."

== NCAA 1961 men's basketball scandal ==
During 1960, the broad NCAA 1961 men's basketball gambling scandal began to break, with activity centered in the Manhattan District Attorney's office, headed by Frank Hogan. In May 1961, Wilky Gilmore was interviewed by detectives in the District Attorney's office, after statements made by basketball star Connie Hawkins indicated that he, Hawkins, had sought to introduce ex-basketball player and gambler Jack Molinas to Gilmore. Gilmore later testified on matters related to the approach by gamblers to a New York grand jury.

The 1961 men's basketball gambling scandal involved a complex scheme in which kingpins Molinas and Joe Hacken, often using intermediaries – other basketball players or well-known sports figures – sought to recruit and bribe college basketball players to either throw games outright, or, more often, to influence the point-spread so that gamblers in the know could win money on a game.

Having apparently concluded that Gilmore had declined to meet with Molinas, and had not taken a bribe, the District Attorney's office did not charge Gilmore with any wrongdoing, nor was he required to testify in any of the trials that later took place as a result of the scandal. He had, however, violated an arcane aspect of New York State law by failing to report the bribe attempt to the authorities.

As a consequence of the legal proceedings related to the scandal in New York, the University of Colorado opened its own investigation during the spring of 1961. Wilky Gilmore was not found to be responsible for any wrongdoing in the point-shaving scandal, but he was temporarily deemed ineligible to play in intercollegiate competition due to his having participated in an amateur basketball league in the New York area during the summer of 1960 (the rule in question was rescinded by the Big Eight in December 1960). In September 1961, the Big Eight cleared Gilmore for league play during his senior year, 1961-62.

== Try-out with the St. Louis Hawks ==
The St. Louis Hawks of the National Basketball Association drafted Wilky Gilmore in the fourteenth round of the 1962 draft and signed him in August the same year. Due to the lingering effects of his knee injury, and the fact that the Hawks at that time had prominent front-court players such as Bob Pettit and Cliff Hagan, with Zelmo Beatty another 1962 draft pick, Gilmore was one of the final cuts from the team.

== Later career ==
After graduating from the University of Colorado in 1962, Wilky Gilmore returned to his hometown of New Canaan, Connecticut. He earned a CPA license and was employed with the accounting firm Coopers and Lybrand.

In 1973, Wilky Gilmore completed a Juris Doctor degree at the University of Connecticut School of Law, which was gradually seeing an increase in the percentage of African American students. He practiced law in the Fairfield County area with lawyer and partner Harvey Melzer. Gilmore was active in the community, for example establishing and running a summer basketball camp for local youth, which allowed him to apply his deep knowledge of basketball and his considerable social skills to support the development of young athletes.

Gilmore served as a member of the first Town Council in New Canaan.

During the 1980s, Gilmore moved to the San Diego, California area, where he had ambitions of building on his legal training to become a sports agent. He undertook work in real estate law.

On November 10, 1993, at the age of 53, Wilky Gilmore died of a heart attack in Del Mar, California.

In June 2016, Wilky Gilmore was inducted into the Fairfield County (Connecticut) Sports Hall of Fame, together with prominent woman basketball player Rita Williams.
