= Morandais =

Morandais is a French surname. Notable people with the surname include:

- Michel Morandais (born 1979), French basketball player
- Sylvanie Morandais (born 1979), French hurdler
