= Sox Walseth =

American basketball player and coach (1926–2004)

Biographical details
- Born: April 6, 1926; Aberdeen, South Dakota, U.S.
- Died: January 28, 2004 (aged 77); Boulder, Colorado, U.S.

Playing career
- 1945–1948: Colorado
- Position: Guard

Coaching career (HC unless noted)
- 1948–1953: Colorado (freshmen)
- 1953–1954: Arvin HS
- 1954–1956: South Dakota State
- 1956–1976: Colorado
- 1980–1983: Colorado (women's)

Head coaching record
- Overall: 291–264 (men's); 77–21 (women's)

Accomplishments and honors

Championships
- NCC regular season (1956); 3 Big Eight regular season (1962, 1963, 1969)

Awards
- 4× Big Eight Coach of the Year (1962, 1963, 1969, 1973)

Russell "Sox" Walseth (April 6, 1926 – January 28, 2004) was an American college basketball coach, best known for his tenures as both the men's and women's head coach at the University of Colorado Boulder.

Walseth was born in Aberdeen, South Dakota, and an all-state basketball player at Pierre High School, graduating in 1944. He joined the U. S. Navy, and was ultimately moved to Colorado where he attended the University of Colorado and was a member of the basketball and baseball teams. Following his graduation, he stayed at Colorado to earn a master's degree and coach the freshman team. He then moved on to coach Arvin High School in Arvin, California, for the 1953–54 season.

Walseth moved to the college ranks the following season as he was named head coach at South Dakota State. He led the Jackrabbits to a significant improvement, as he compiled records of 14–11, then 17–7 in his two seasons. In the 1955–56 season he led the team to the North Central Conference championship and a berth in the 1956 NAIA Tournament. This performance helped Walseth earn the Colorado head coaching job when his former mentor Bebe Lee was named athletic director at Kansas State University. Walseth coached the Buffaloes for twenty seasons, compiling a 261–245 record. His teams won three Big Eight Conference championships (in 1962, 1963 and 1969) and won the league's Coach of the Year award four times (1962, 1963, 1969 and 1973). Under his watch, Ken Charlton and Cliff Meely earned All-American honors. Walseth was relieved of his duties following the 1975–76 season, but was coaxed out of retirement in 1980 to oversee the Buffaloes' women's team for three seasons, compiling a record of 77–21. He was the first person to coach both men's and women's basketball at the same school.

Walseth died at his home in Boulder, Colorado, on January 28, 2004, at the age of 77.
