= Josh Scott (basketball) =

American basketball player

Free agent
- Position: Power forward

Personal information
- Born: July 13, 1993 (age 33)
- Listed height: 6 ft 10 in (2.08 m)
- Listed weight: 245 lb (111 kg)

Career information
- High school: Lewis-Palmer (Monument, Colorado)
- College: Colorado (2012–2016)
- NBA draft: 2016: undrafted
- Playing career: 2016–present

Career history
- 2016–2017: MZT Skopje
- 2017–2018: Shimane Susanoo Magic
- 2018–2020: Ryukyu Golden Kings
- 2020–2023: Utsunomiya Brex
- 2023–2024: Yokohama B-Corsairs

Career highlights
- B.League All Star (2022, 2023, 2024); B.League champion (2022); 2× First-team All-Pac-12 (2014, 2016); Pac-12 All-Defensive team (2016); Colorado Gatorade Player of the Year (2012); Third-team Parade All-American (2012); Mr. Colorado Basketball (2012)

Josh Scott (born July 13, 1993) is an American professional basketball player who last played for Yokohama B-Corsairs of the Japanese B.League. He played college basketball for the Colorado Buffaloes, where he was a two-time All-Pac-12 Conference honoree.

== College career ==
Scott played four years of college basketball for the Colorado Buffaloes under coach Tad Boyle between 2012 and 2016. Scott is one of just two players in Colorado history, joining CU Athletic Hall of Famer Cliff Meely, to record 1,700 points, 900 rebounds and 100 blocked shots. His name is scattered throughout the Colorado career record book ranking second in free throws made (504) and blocked shots (162), third in rebounds (974) and games started (120), fourth in free throws attempted (655), fifth in minutes played (3.761) and double-doubles (36), sixth in games played (124), eighth in scoring (1,709) and field goals made (600), 13th in field goal percentage (.519), 18th in free throw percentage (.769), 28th in steals (80) and 50th in assists (125). He was a three-time Chauncey Billups Award winner as the team's most valuable player and was also the co-winner of the 2016 CUSPY Male Career Athletic Achievement Award. One of three four-year seniors in his class (2012–16) - joining Xavier Talton and Eli Stalzer - to achieve 82 wins, the third most in team history. He scored in double digits in 95 of 124 games and also had 41 double-digit rebounding efforts.

=== College Statistics ===
Year	Team	GP	GS	MPG	FG%	3P%	FT%	RPG	APG	SPG	BPG	PPG
2012–13	Colorado	31	30	28.2	.486	1.000	.753	5.7	0.6	0.5	0.8	10.3
2013–14	Colorado	35	34	31.6	.511	.000	.810	8.4	0.6	0.8	1.1	14.1
2014–15	Colorado	26	25	30.8	.544	.250	.752	8.4	1.1	0.7	1.8	14.5
2015–16	Colorado	32	31	30.6	.531	.333	.749	8.8	1.8	0.6	1.6	16.3
Career		124	120	30.3	.519	.313	.770	7.9	1.0	0.6	1.3	13.8

== Professional career ==
On July 26, 2016, Scott signed with MZT Skopje of the Macedonian League.

On August 20, 2017, Scott signed with Shimane Susanoo Magic of the Japanese B.League for the 2017–18 season. He continued in Japan with Ryukyu Golden Kings between 2018 and 2020, and then Utsunomiya Brex between 2020 and 2023.

For the 2023–24 season, Scott joined Yokohama B-Corsairs.

== Career statistics ==
Legend
GP	Games played	GS	Games started	MPG	Minutes per game
FG%	Field goal percentage	3P%	3-point field goal percentage	FT%	Free throw percentage
RPG	Rebounds per game	APG	Assists per game	SPG	Steals per game
BPG	Blocks per game	PPG	Points per game	**Bold**	Career high

=== Europe ===
Year	Team	GP	GS	MPG	FG%	3P%	FT%	RPG	APG	SPG	BPG	PPG
2016-17	KK MZT Skopje	32	17	25.4	.621	.000	.736	6.9	0.9	0.5	1.3	12.2

=== Japan ===
Year	Team	GP	GS	MPG	FG%	3P%	FT%	RPG	APG	SPG	BPG	PPG
2017-18	Shimane Susanoo Magic	50	47	28.2	.525	.000	.706	10.9	2.3	0.9	1.0	18.3
2018-19	Ryukyu Golden Kings	17	17	31.4	.635	.000	.747	8.53	1.7	0.8	0.7	17.8
