= Shaun Vandiver =

American basketball player (born 1968)

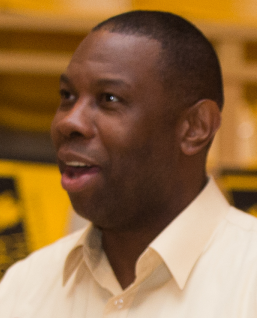

Weber State Wildcats
- Title: Assistant coach
- League: Big Sky

Personal information
- Born: June 15, 1968 (age 58) Bolingbrook, Illinois, U.S.
- Listed height: 6 ft 10 in (2.08 m)
- Listed weight: 240 lb (109 kg)

Career information
- High school: Romeoville (Romeoville, Illinois)
- College: Hutchinson CC (1987–1988); Colorado (1988–1991)
- NBA draft: 1991: 1st round, 25th overall pick
- Drafted by: Golden State Warriors
- Playing career: 1991–2001
- Position: Center / power forward
- Coaching career: 2002–present

Career history

Playing
- 1991–1992: Fortitudo Bologna
- 1992–1993: Cajabilbao
- 1993–1994: Pau-Orthez
- 1994: Valvi Girona
- 1994–1995: Viola Reggio Calabria
- 1995–1997: Gran Canaria
- 1997–2001: CB Estudiantes

Coaching
- 2002–2003: Wyoming (GA)
- 2003–2004: Northern Colorado (assistant)
- 2004–2005: Bowling Green (assistant)
- 2005–2010: Wyoming (assistant)
- 2010–2011: Boise State (assistant)
- 2011–2018: Emporia State
- 2018–2025: Wyoming (assistant)
- 2025–present: Weber State (assistant)

Career highlights
- 2× First-team All-Big Eight (1990, 1991)
- Stats at Basketball Reference

Shaun Garin Vandiver (born June 15, 1968) is a retired American college and professional basketball player and currently an assistant basketball coach for Weber State. Vandiver served as the head basketball coach at Emporia State University from 2011 to 2018. Born in Chicago, the Bolingbrook, Illinois native was selected 25th overall in the 1991 NBA draft, from Hutchinson Community College and the University of Colorado Boulder. A 6-foot-10-inch (2.08 m), 240-pound (110 kg) power forward was also an outstanding basketball player in the European leagues in Italy (for Mangiaebevi Bologna in 1991–92 and Pfizer Reggio Calabria in 1994–95) and Spain (Caja Bilbao in 1995–96).

== College career ==
Vandiver played one season for the Hutchinson Community College Blue Dragons, before transferring to the University of Colorado Boulder. He was the Big Eight Conference's rookie of the year in 1988, and was a two time First Team All Big 8 selection in 1990 and 1991. In his final season in 1990–91, he led Colorado to a third-place finish in the National Invitation Tournament. Prior to that, Colorado had not been to the National Invitation Tournament semifinals in 22 years. Vandiver was third on the Buffaloes' all-time scoring list until being surpassed in early 2008 by Richard Roby.

== Professional career ==
Vandiver was selected 25th overall in the 1991 NBA draft by the Golden State Warriors, but did not play for them. He wound up playing the next nine years for various teams in Europe.

== Coaching career ==
In April 2011, Vandiver was named the head men's basketball coach at Emporia State University. Previously in the 2010–11 season, Vandiver was an assistant to head coach Leon Rice at Boise State. Prior to that he served as an assistant to Steve McClain (under whom he played at Hutchinson CC) at the University of Wyoming, a position he held since 2005. Vandiver was a graduate assistant coach with Wyoming in 2002–03, and a full-time assistant coach at Bowling Green in 2003–04, and Northern Colorado in 2004–05. Vandiver returned to Wyoming as an assistant coach in April 2018. On June 9, 2025, Vandiver was hired as an assistant coach at Weber State.

== Head coaching record ==
Record table
Season	Team	Overall	Conference	Standing	Postseason
Emporia State Hornets (MIAA) (2011–2018)
2011–12	Emporia State	9–18	5–17		
2012–13	Emporia State	13–14	8–11		
2013–14	Emporia State	18–13	10–10		
2014–15	Emporia State	12–16	5–14		
2015–16	Emporia State	13–16	10–12		
2016–17	Emporia State	13–16	9–12		
2017–18	Emporia State	9–19	4–15		
Emporia State:		87–112	51–91		
Total:		87–112			
National champion Postseason invitational champion Conference regular season champion Conference regular season and conference tournament champion Division regular season champion Division regular season and conference tournament champion Conference tournament champion

== Personal ==
Vandiver has five children with his wife Danielle.
