= Donnie Boyce =

American basketball player (born 1973)

Personal information
- Born: September 2, 1973 (age 53) Chicago, Illinois, U.S.
- Listed height: 6 ft 5 in (1.96 m)
- Listed weight: 196 lb (89 kg)

Career information
- High school: Proviso East (Maywood, Illinois)
- College: Colorado (1991–1995)
- NBA draft: 1995: 2nd round, 42nd overall pick
- Drafted by: Atlanta Hawks
- Playing career: 1995–2006
- Position: Shooting guard
- Number: 24
- Coaching career: 2011–present

Career history

Playing
- 1995–1997: Atlanta Hawks
- 1997–1998: Yakima Sun Kings
- 1998–1999: CSP Limoges
- 1999–2000: Pico FC
- 2003–2004: Yakama Sun Kings
- 2005: Nebraska Cranes
- 2006: Albany Patroons

Coaching
- 2011–2015: Proviso East HS
- 2015–2016: Texas Legends (assistant)
- 2016–present: Proviso East HS

Career highlights
- 2× First-team All-Big Eight (1994, 1995)
- Stats at NBA.com
- Stats at Basketball Reference

Donald Nathaniel Boyce (born September 2, 1973) is an American former professional basketball player who currently works as head coach for Proviso East High School in Maywood, Illinois. He played college basketball for the Colorado Buffaloes.

== Early life ==
Boyce played high school at Proviso East in Maywood, Illinois, along with future NBA draft picks Michael Finley and Sherell Ford. Boyce played collegiately at the University of Colorado, finishing his career in 1995 as the Buffaloes' all-time leading scorer (until Richard Roby surpassed him in 2008).

In September 1993, Boyce was arrested for allegedly taking part in a drug deal outside a fast-food restaurant in Boulder, Colorado. Boyce stated he never took or used drugs.

== Professional career ==
Boyce was selected with the 13th pick in the 2nd round of the 1995 NBA draft by the Atlanta Hawks for whom he played for parts of two seasons from 1996 to 1997, averaging 2.6 points in 30 total games. Boyce's final NBA game was on February 19, 1997, in a 100 - 87 win over the Indiana Pacers where he played for 4 minutes and recorded no stats.

On an 11-year career, Boyce played in the CBA and USBL and also had playing stints in Argentina and France.

== Career statistics ==
Legend
GP	Games played	GS	Games started	MPG	Minutes per game
FG%	Field goal percentage	3P%	3-point field goal percentage	FT%	Free throw percentage
RPG	Rebounds per game	APG	Assists per game	SPG	Steals per game
BPG	Blocks per game	PPG	Points per game	**Bold**	Career high

=== NBA ===
==== Regular season ====
Year	Team	GP	GS	MPG	FG%	3P%	FT%	RPG	APG	SPG	BPG	PPG
1995–96	Atlanta	8	0	5.1	**.391**	**.500**	**.500**	**1.3**	0.4	0.4	0.1	**3.0**
1996–97	Atlanta	**22**	**2**	**7.0**	.333	.125	**.500**	0.7	**0.6**	**0.5**	**0.2**	2.5
Career		30	2	6.5	.349	.250	.500	0.8	0.5	0.4	0.2	2.6

==== Playoffs ====
Year	Team	GP	GS	MPG	FG%	3P%	FT%	RPG	APG	SPG	BPG	PPG
1995–96	Atlanta	1	0	2.0	.000	.000	.000	0.0	0.0	0.0	0.0	0.0

=== College ===
Year	Team	GP	GS	MPG	FG%	3P%	FT%	RPG	APG	SPG	BPG	PPG
1991–92	Colorado	**28**	**28**	33.5	.419	.278	.564	4.8	3.1	2.4	1.0	14.9
1992–93	Colorado	27	24	33.2	**.455**	.315	.639	6.2	3.6	1.9	0.7	19.1
1993–94	Colorado	26	26	**34.3**	.401	**.317**	**.708**	**6.7**	**4.5**	2.3	**1.5**	**22.4**
1994–95	Colorado	26	26	30.8	.409	.316	.706	6.5	4.1	**2.5**	1.1	18.5
Career		107	104	33.0	.421	.308	.666	6.0	3.8	2.3	1.1	18.6

== Coaching career ==
Boyce began his coaching career in 2011 with his alma-mater, Proviso East. His team finished with a 32–1 record in 2011–12 and a 29–5 record in 2012–13, losing both times in the IHSA tournament to the Jabari Parker-led Simeon Wolverines (in the state title game in the former year, and the state semi-final in the latter.)

On October 19, 2015, Boyce was hired by the Texas Legends of the NBA Development League to work as an assistant coach.

Boyce was reinstated as Proviso East Head Coach at the beginning of March 2016.
