= Vince Kelley =

American basketball player (born 1962)

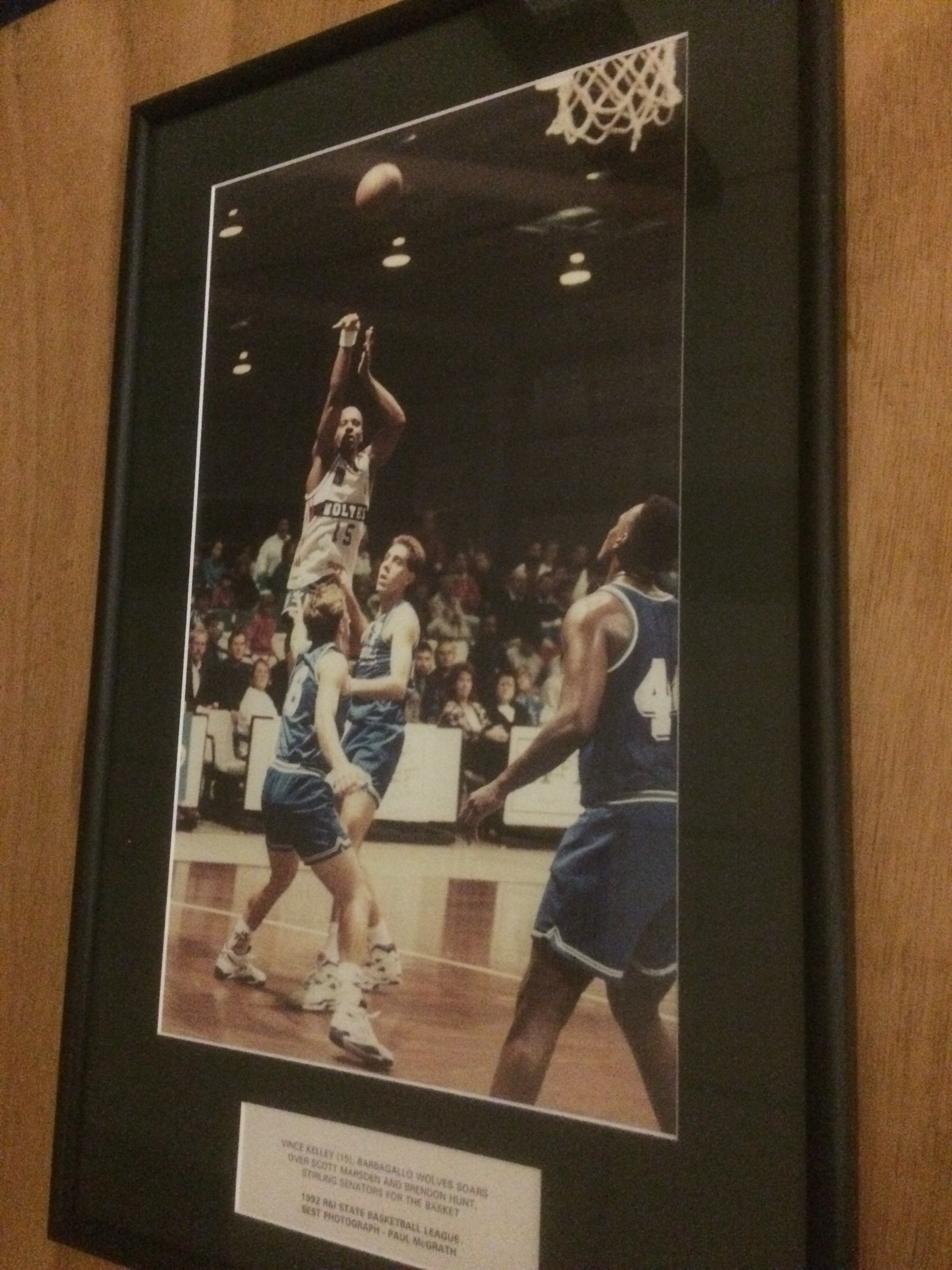
- Kelley in 1992

Personal information
- Born: December 5, 1962 (age 63) Los Angeles, California, U.S.
- Listed height: 6 ft 7 in (2.01 m)
- Listed weight: 210 lb (95 kg)

Career information
- High school: Inglewood (Inglewood, California)
- College: Colorado (1980–1984)
- NBA draft: 1984: undrafted
- Playing career: 1985–2002
- Position: Forward

Career history
- 1985: Bankstown Bruins
- 1986–1987: West Sydney Westars
- 1988–1989: Ginásio
- 1990: Kanyana Kings
- 1991–1997: Wanneroo Wolves
- 1998–1999: Rockingham Flames
- 2000–2001: Mandurah Magic
- 2002: East Perth Eagles

Career highlights
- SBL champion (1993); SBL Most Valuable Player (1992); SBL leading scorer (1990)

Vincent Kelley (born December 5, 1962) is an American former professional basketball player who played collegiately for the Colorado Buffaloes before spending the majority of his professional career in Australia. He began his career in the first-tier National Basketball League (NBL) and finished in the second-tier State Basketball League (SBL).

== High school and college career ==
Kelley attended Inglewood High School in Inglewood, California. The school's basketball team was the nation's top-ranked team in 1980, going undefeated and winning the national championship, with Kelley playing alongside future NBA players Jay Humphries and Ralph Jackson.

Kelley's college career saw him play four years for the Colorado Buffaloes between 1980 and 1984. At 6'7", he often played the low post for an undersized Colorado team. He graduated ranking third on the school's all-time rebounds list with 730. He also scored 1,180 career points in 112 games. As a junior in 1982–83, he earned All-Big Eight Conference Honorable Mention honors.

Upon leaving Colorado, Kelley had try-outs with a number of CBA teams and the Denver Nuggets of the NBA.

=== College statistics ===
Year	Team	GP	GS	MPG	FG%	3P%	FT%	RPG	APG	SPG	BPG	PPG
1980–81	Colorado	28	6	18.9	.518		.603	3.8	.3	.6	.1	6.3
1981–82	Colorado	27	27	32.1	.449		.748	6.4	2.0	.7	.7	13.4
1982–83	Colorado	28	28	35.5	.436		.614	9.1	1.9	1.5	.8	11.7
1983–84	Colorado	29	29	33.6	.433		.743	6.8	1.9	.9	.4	10.8
Career		112	90	30.0	.450		.686	6.5	1.5	.9	.5	10.5

== Professional career ==
=== NBL ===
In 1985, Kelley moved to Australia and joined the Bankstown Bruins of the National Basketball League (NBL). He scored 40 points or more four times, including a 51-point game. In 25 games, he averaged 31.6 points, 12.6 rebounds, 1.5 assists, 1.2 steals and 1.6 blocks per game.

Kelley continued on with the franchise in 1986, now known as the West Sydney Westars, and helped them reach the playoffs. He twice scored 40 points or more during the season. In 27 games, he averaged 29.0 points, 12.5 rebounds, 2.3 assists, 1.2 steals and 1.2 blocks per game.

In his third season with the franchise in 1987, Kelley scored 30 points or more six times and averaged 24.0 points, 9.4 rebounds, 2.2 assists and 1.2 steals in 25 games.

In 77 career NBL games, Kelley averaged 28.2 points and 11.5 rebounds.

=== Portugal ===
Kelley's next two years were spent in Portugal with Ginásio, where he helped them win the second division in 1988 and move up to the first division.

=== SBL ===
In 1990, Kelley returned to Australia and joined the Kanyana Kings in Mandurah to play in the team's inaugural season in Western Australia's State Basketball League (SBL). He helped the Kings finish in second place on the regular-season standings with a 20–6 record. In 29 games, he averaged 36.6 points.

Kelley joined the Wanneroo Wolves in 1991 and went on to play seven seasons for the team. He was named the SBL's Most Valuable Player in 1992 and was player-coach of the Wolves' 1993 championship team. He was also Club MVP in each of his seven seasons. In 196 games for the Wolves, he averaged 27.4 points.

In 1998 and 1999, Kelley played for the Rockingham Flames. In 59 games for the Flames, he averaged 22.7 points per game. In 2000, he returned to Mandurah to play for the renamed Magic. In 44 games over two seasons, he averaged 23.8 points. Kelley's final season came in 2002, averaging 26.3 points in 23 games for the East Perth Eagles.

Kelley retired having played 351 SBL games across 13 seasons with 9,428 career points at 26.9 per game. He is the league's all-time leading scorer, and in 2013, he was named in the SBL's 25th Year All Star Team.

== Personal ==
Kelley has dual citizenship with the United States and Australia. His wife is Australian.

Kelley's daughter Desiree plays for the Willetton Tigers in the NBL1 West. His nephew Ryan also played college basketball for Colorado.
