= Jay Humphries =

American basketball player and coach

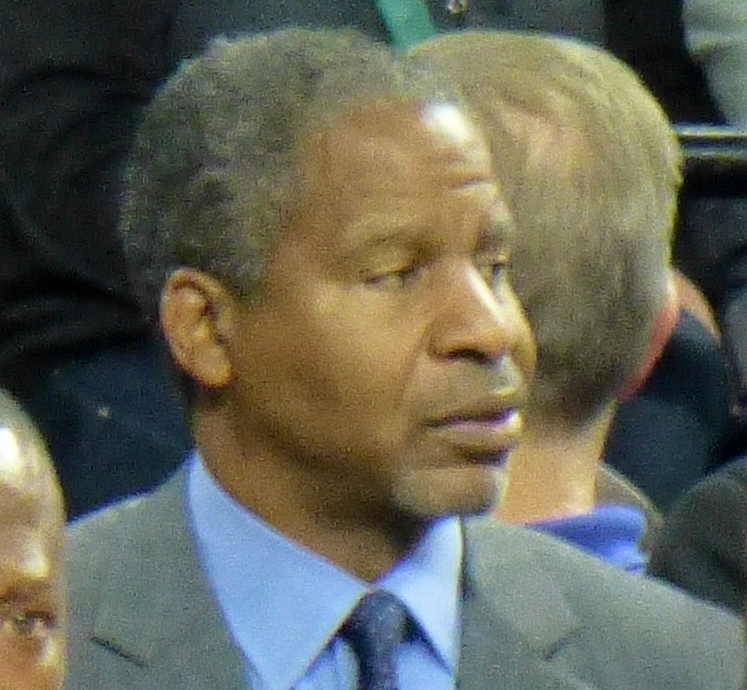
- Humphries in 2014 as Brooklyn Nets assistant coach

Personal information
- Born: October 17, 1962 (age 64) Los Angeles, California, U.S.
- Listed height: 6 ft 3 in (1.91 m)
- Listed weight: 185 lb (84 kg)

Career information
- High school: Inglewood (Inglewood, California)
- College: Colorado (1980–1984)
- NBA draft: 1984: 1st round, 13th overall pick
- Drafted by: Phoenix Suns
- Playing career: 1984–1995
- Position: Shooting guard
- Number: 24, 6, 5
- Coaching career: 2001–2015

Career history

Playing
- 1984–1988: Phoenix Suns
- 1988–1992: Milwaukee Bucks
- 1992–1995: Utah Jazz
- 1995: Boston Celtics

Coaching
- 2001–2002: Jilin Northeast Tigers
- 2002–2005: Wonju TG Xers (assoc. HC)
- 2005–2007: Incheon Electroland Black Slammers
- 2007–2008: Phoenix Suns (assistant)
- 2008–2010: Reno Bighorns
- 2010–2011: Foshan Dralions
- 2014–2015: Brooklyn Nets (assistant)

Career highlights
- First-team All-Big Eight (1984)

Career NBA statistics
- Points: 8,772 (11.1 ppg)
- Assists: 4,339 (5.5 apg)
- Steals: 1,153 (1.5 spg)
- Stats at NBA.com
- Stats at Basketball Reference

John Jay Humphries (born October 17, 1962) is an American former professional basketball player who played in the National Basketball Association (NBA). He later served as the first head coach of the NBA D-League's Reno Bighorns. He last worked as an assistant coach for the Brooklyn Nets.

Humphries played on the top-ranked high school basketball team in the country in 1980. Inglewood High School went undefeated with the help of Humphries, center Vince Kelley, point guard Ralph Jackson, and wing man Angelo Robinson, as they went on to win the national championship that year. Humphries, a 6'3" guard, then played four seasons of college basketball for the University of Colorado. By the end of his stint in Colorado, he broke 16 school records including career assists, steals (315), and games played. During the 1982–83 season, he led the nation in steals with a 4.1 per game average and shattered the Big Eight Conference record for steals in a season (92, Darnell Valentine, University of Kansas, 1980–81) with 115 in 28 games. He had 10 steals in a non-conference game against the University of Wisconsin-Milwaukee. Jay posted eight or more steals in three games of January 1983.

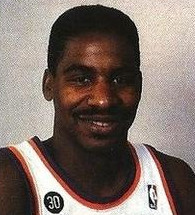
Humphries in 1987

Humphries was selected 13th overall by the Phoenix Suns in the 1984 NBA draft. He was traded to the Milwaukee Bucks in 1988. Perhaps his best season came in 1989, when he averaged what would be career bests of 15.3 points, 3.3 rebounds, 1.9 steals, as well as 5.8 assists per game. On December 18, 1990, Humphries scored a career high 36 points in a 106–101 win over the Detroit Pistons. The Bucks traded him to the Utah Jazz prior to the 1992–93 season in exchange for Blue Edwards. Part of multiple postseason runs with the Jazz, on April 30, 1994, Humphries led Utah to a 96–84 Game 2 win over the San Antonio Spurs, with a game-leading 25 points. Humphries and the Jazz went on to win the series in four games, and eventually made the Western Conference Finals before losing to the eventual champion Houston Rockets. Humphries retired in 1995 as a member of the Boston Celtics; he holds career averages of 11.1 points and 5.5 assists per game.

In 1998, he joined a team of retired NBA players, including Kareem Abdul-Jabbar, Oscar Robertson and Adrian Dantley on a tour of China for a series of exhibition games against the Chinese national team.

Humphries began his basketball coaching career as an associate head coach in the Chinese CBA in 2001. He spent another five years in the Korean Professional Basketball League in South Korea as head coach of the Inchon ET Land Black Slamer, and associate head coach for the Wonju TG Xers.

From 2010 to 2012 he served as the head coach for the Foshan Linglions.

In the 2012–13 season, he served as the assistant coach for the Memphis Grizzlies.

For the 2014–15 season, Humphries was hired by the Brooklyn Nets as an assistant to new head coach Lionel Hollins and helped his team reach the playoffs.

== NBA career statistics ==
Legend
GP	Games played	GS	Games started	MPG	Minutes per game
FG%	Field goal percentage	3P%	3-point field goal percentage	FT%	Free throw percentage
RPG	Rebounds per game	APG	Assists per game	SPG	Steals per game
BPG	Blocks per game	PPG	Points per game	**Bold**	Career high
*	Led the league

=== Regular season ===
Year	Team	GP	GS	MPG	FG%	3P%	FT%	RPG	APG	SPG	BPG	PPG
1984–85	Phoenix	80	39	25.8	.446	.200	**.829**	2.1	4.4	1.3	0.1	8.8
1985–86	Phoenix	**82**	**82**	33.3	.479	.138	.767	3.2	6.4	1.6	0.1	11.0
1986–87	Phoenix	**82***	**82**	31.5	.477	.185	.769	3.2	**7.7**	1.4	0.1	11.3
1987–88	Phoenix	50	33	31.1	**.545**	.188	.741	3.0	7.1	1.2	0.1	12.7
1987–88	Milwaukee	18	0	14.0	.370	.000	.643	1.3	2.3	1.1	0.1	2.7
1988–89	Milwaukee	73	50	30.4	.483	.266	.816	2.6	5.5	**1.9**	0.1	11.6
1989–90	Milwaukee	81	81	**34.8**	.494	.300	.786	**3.3**	5.8	**1.9**	0.1	**15.3**
1990–91	Milwaukee	80	80	34.1	.502	.373	.799	2.8	6.7	1.6	0.1	15.2
1991–92	Milwaukee	71	71	31.8	.469	.292	.783	2.6	6.6	1.7	**0.2**	14.0
1992–93	Utah	78	20	26.1	.436	.200	.777	1.8	4.1	1.3	0.1	8.8
1993–94	Utah	75	19	21.6	.436	.396	.750	1.7	2.9	0.9	0.1	7.5
1994–95	Utah	12	0	12.4	.160	**.667**	.000	0.8	0.8	0.6	0.0	0.8
1994–95	Boston	6	0	8.7	.444	.000	.500	0.5	1.7	0.3	0.0	1.7
Career		788	557	29.3	.476	.297	.782	2.5	5.5	1.5	0.1	11.1

=== Playoffs ===
Year	Team	GP	GS	MPG	FG%	3P%	FT%	RPG	APG	SPG	BPG	PPG
1984–85	Phoenix	3	3	30.0	**.645**	.000	.750	1.7	5.3	0.7	0.0	**16.3**
1987–88	Milwaukee	2	0	9.0	.000	.000	.000	1.5	0.5	0.5	0.0	0.0
1988–89	Milwaukee	9	**9**	35.9	.495	.167	.882	**3.0**	7.8	0.9	0.0	14.6
1989–90	Milwaukee	3	2	26.3	.533	.333	.769	1.7	6.3	**1.0**	0.0	9.0
1990–91	Milwaukee	3	3	**41.0**	.531	**.400**	**.900**	2.0	**8.3**	0.7	0.0	15.0
1992–93	Utah	5	0	23.0	.333	.250	.500	2.0	3.4	0.6	**0.6**	5.2
1993–94	Utah	**16**	0	22.3	.426	.318	.679	2.3	2.4	0.8	0.1	7.4
Career		41	17	26.9	.467	.268	.782	2.3	4.6	0.8	0.1	9.7
