= Michel Morandais =

French basketball player (born 1979)

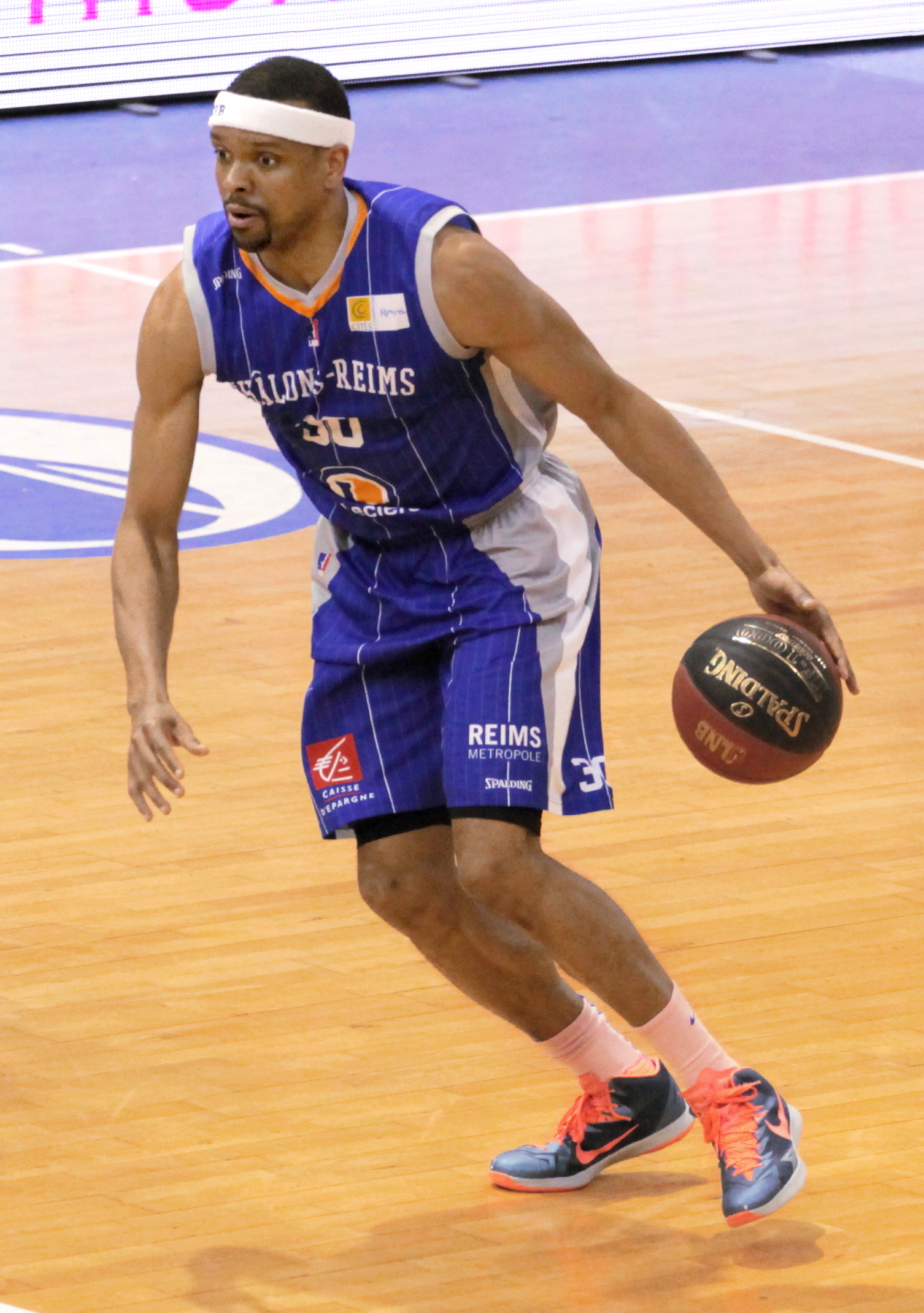
- Morandais with Châlons-Reims in 2015

Personal information
- Born: 10 January 1979 (age 47) Les Abymes, France
- Listed height: 6 ft 5 in (1.96 m)
- Listed weight: 205 lb (93 kg)

Career information
- High school: Life Center Academy High School (Burlington, New Jersey)
- College: Colorado (2000–2004)
- NBA draft: 2004: undrafted
- Playing career: 2004–2017
- Position: Shooting guard / small forward
- Number: 7

Career history
- 2004–2005: Pallacanestro Cantù
- 2005–2007: Basket Napoli
- 2007: FC Barcelona
- 2007–2008: Estudiantes
- 2008–2009: SLUC Nancy Basket
- 2009–2010: Cimberio Varese
- 2010–2013: Paris-Levallois
- 2013–2016: Champagne Châlons-Reims Basket
- 2016–2017: ASVEL Basket

Career highlights
- Italian Cup winner (2006); Italian League All-Star (2006); French Supercup winner (2008); French 2nd Division French Player's MVP (2014); 2× Second-team All-Big 12 Conference (2003, 2004)

Michel Morandais (born 10 January 1979) is a French former professional basketball player.

== College career ==
After playing with the youth teams of the French club Levallois Sporting Club, Morandais played college basketball in the United States with the Colorado Buffaloes of the Pac-12 Conference.

== Professional career ==
After not being selected in the 2004 NBA draft, Morandais signed with Italian League club Cantù. From 2004 to 2008, Morandais spent time with four clubs in Italy and Spain, including Barcelona Basket of the Spanish ACB League. He was selected to the Italian LBA league's All-Star Game.

In 2008, he joined the French League club SLUC Nancy. While with the French club Champagne Châlons-Reims, Morandais was named the French 2nd Division French Player's MVP in 2014. He finished his pro club career playing with the French club ASVEL and retired in 2017.

== National team career ==
Morandais played with the senior French national team in 10 games.
