= David Harrison (basketball) =

American basketball player (born 1982)

Personal information
- Born: August 15, 1982 (age 44) Nashville, Tennessee, U.S.
- Listed height: 7 ft 0 in (2.13 m)
- Listed weight: 250 lb (113 kg)

Career information
- High school: Brentwood Academy (Brentwood, Tennessee)
- College: Colorado (2001–2004)
- NBA draft: 2004: 1st round, 29th overall pick
- Drafted by: Indiana Pacers
- Playing career: 2004–2012
- Position: Center
- Number: 13, 16, 7, 3

Career history
- 2004–2008: Indiana Pacers
- 2008–2009: Beijing Ducks
- 2009–2010: Guangdong Southern Tigers
- 2011–2012: Tianjin Ronggang
- 2012: Reno Bighorns

Career highlights
- CBA champion (2010); First-team All-Big 12 (2004); First-team Parade All-American (2001); McDonald's All-American (2001); 2× Tennessee Mr. Basketball (2000, 2001)
- Stats at NBA.com
- Stats at Basketball Reference

David Joshua Harrison (born August 15, 1982) is an American former professional basketball player. He played college basketball for the Colorado Buffaloes before being selected with the 29th overall pick in the 2004 NBA draft by the Indiana Pacers. He played four seasons in the National Basketball Association (NBA) for the Pacers before playing three seasons in the Chinese Basketball Association between 2008 and 2012.

== High school and college career ==
At Brentwood Academy, Harrison was named Tennessee Mr. Basketball in both 2000 and 2001.

In college, he was named First Team All-Big 12 and earned Honorable Mention All-America honors by the Associated Press as a junior. He finished his college career as Colorado's all-time leading shot-blocker with 225 blocks.

== NBA career ==
Harrison was drafted 29th overall in the 2004 NBA draft by the Indiana Pacers. Harrison was expected to be the #2 or maybe even #3 center in the Pacers' depth chart for his rookie year of 2004–05, behind Jeff Foster and Scot Pollard. However, due to injuries to Pollard and the suspensions of Jermaine O'Neal, Stephen Jackson and Ron Artest, he became a starter at a much earlier part of his career than most people anticipated. He ended up starting 14 of the 43 games he played in his rookie season, before missing the final two months due to injury.

Harrison was charged with one count of assault and battery for his involvement in the Pacers–Pistons brawl at The Palace of Auburn Hills on November 19, 2004, though he was not penalized by the league for the incident.

In his sophomore season of 2005–06 with the Pacers, Harrison played in 67 games, starting 17 of them, playing an average of 15.4 minutes and contributing 5.7 points and 3.8 rebounds per game.

In 2008, the Pacers suspended Harrison for one game following an incident in which Harrison berated an official after being hit in the face by Matt Bonner hit him in the face (Bonner was called for an offensive foul). In Harrison's first game back from the suspension he had 4 points, 6 rebounds and a career high 6 blocks in just 20 minutes of play.

The Indiana Pacers chose not to re-sign Harrison after his contract expired at the end of the 2007–08 season. The Minnesota Timberwolves signed him to their practice squad for the preseason, but he was waived before the 2008–09 regular season began.

== Off-court ==
In an interview, Harrison admitted to smoking marijuana in the offseason. The habit continued into the regular season and he was suspended 5 games in 2008.

== Post-NBA career ==
After leaving the Indiana Pacers after the 2007–2008 season, he was invited to the Minnesota Timberwolves training camp but they declined to offer him a contract. He subsequently moved to China. He played for the Beijing Ducks in the 2008–09 season and the Guangdong Southern Tigers in 2009–10. He played for the Tianjin Ronggang in 2011–12.

Harrison finished the 2011–2012 season in the NBA D-League with the Reno Bighorns. He played for the Dallas Mavericks in the 2012 NBA Summer League.

After experiencing financial struggles, Harrison took a job at McDonald's in August 2013. However, he left his position after two weeks because customers hounded him with questions to such an extent that taking orders took as long as 40 minutes. He had developed a mobile game application company named Kage Media Groups LLC, but he couldn't secure investment to bring the games to market. And so Harrison got a job working for Morgan Stanley as a financial adviser but quit when realizing that his day job conflicted with the project he and Chris Yim were developing to provide banking options for companies in the marijuana business. That company became Token HiFi which was founded with assistance from former New York representative Dan Donovan.

== Basketball comeback ==
On September 14, 2015, Harrison decided to return to basketball and signed with the Las Vegas Dealers of the upcoming AmeriLeague. However, the league folded after it was discovered the founder was a con-artist.

== Personal life ==
Harrison is the son of Dennis and Ida Harrison. Dennis is a 10-year-veteran of the NFL. His sister is Isabelle Harrison, a power forward for the New York Liberty and USK Praha. He has one son.

== NBA career statistics ==
Legend
GP	Games played	GS	Games started	MPG	Minutes per game
FG%	Field goal percentage	3P%	3-point field goal percentage	FT%	Free throw percentage
RPG	Rebounds per game	APG	Assists per game	SPG	Steals per game
BPG	Blocks per game	PPG	Points per game	**Bold**	Career high

=== Regular season ===
Year	Team	GP	GS	MPG	FG%	3P%	FT%	RPG	APG	SPG	BPG	PPG
2004–05	Indiana	43	14	**17.7**	**.576**	.000	**.571**	3.1	**.3**	**.4**	**1.3**	**6.1**
2005–06	Indiana	**67**	**17**	15.4	.503	.000	.511	**3.8**	.2	.3	.9	5.7
2006–07	Indiana	24	2	7.9	.517	.000	.500	1.8	**.3**	.2	.5	3.0
2007–08	Indiana	55	0	12.8	.529	.000	.510	2.1	**.3**	**.4**	1.1	4.2
Career		189	33	14.2	.530	.000	.525	2.9	.2	.3	1.0	5.0

=== Playoffs ===
Year	Team	GP	GS	MPG	FG%	3P%	FT%	RPG	APG	SPG	BPG	PPG
2006	Indiana	6	0	5.2	.333	.000	.583	.8	.0	.2	.2	2.2
Career		6	0	5.2	.333	.000	.583	.8	.0	.2	.2	2.2

== CBA career statistics ==
Year	Team	GP	GS	MPG	FG%	3P%	FT%	RPG	APG	SPG	BPG	PPG
2008–09	Beijing	45	N/A	42.3	.632	.000	.578	11.2	1.2	1.3	2.4	22.0
2009–10	Guangdong	41	N/A	26.3	.705	.000	.532	8.8	.7	.6	1.2	16.7
2010–11	Guangdong											
Career												
