= Colorado Buffaloes men's basketball =

Men's basketball team in Colorado

2026–27 Colorado Buffaloes men's basketball team
- University: University of Colorado at Boulder
- First season: 1901–02; 125 years ago
- Athletic director: Fernando Lovo
- Head coach: Tad Boyle; 17th season, 329–219 (.600)
- Location: Boulder, Colorado
- Arena: CU Events Center (capacity: 11,064)
- NCAA division: Division I
- Conference: Big 12
- Nickname: Buffaloes
- Colors: Silver, black, and gold
- Student section: C-Unit
- All-time record: 1,458–1,307 (.527)
- NCAA tournament record: 13–18 (.419)

NCAA Division I tournament Final Four
- 1942, 1955
Other NCAA Division I tournament results
Elite Eight	1940, 1942, 1946, 1955, 1962, 1963
Sweet Sixteen	1954, 1955, 1962, 1963, 1969
Appearances	1940, 1942, 1946, 1954, 1955, 1962, 1963, 1969, 1997, 2003, 2012, 2013, 2014, 2016, 2021, 2024

NIT champions
- 1940

Conference tournament champions
- Pac-12: 2012

Conference regular-season champions
- MSAC: 1913, 1914, 1916, 1918, 1919, 1920, 1921, 1929, 1930, 1937, 1938, 1939, 1940, 1942 Big Eight: 1954, 1955, 1962, 1963, 1969

Uniforms
Home	Away	Alternate

The Colorado Buffaloes men's basketball team represents the University of Colorado Boulder. The team competes in the Big 12 Conference of NCAA Division I. They are currently coached by Tad Boyle.

The Buffaloes have competed in 16 NCAA Tournaments, most recently appearing in 2024. Colorado made it to the Final Four in 1942 and 1955. Colorado has played in 13 National Invitation Tournaments, winning the tournament in 1940 and making the semifinals in 1991 and 2011. The Buffs won the Pac-12 conference tournament in 2012, their first season as a member.

== Team history ==
=== The Silver & Gold become Buffaloes ===
The Colorado Men's Basketball team was initially known as the Silver and Gold, and began play on January 10, 1901, beating State Prep School 34–10. While unaffiliated their first few seasons, the school joined the Rocky Mountain Conference in 1909. From 1902 to 1935, the school racked up a 200–151 record.

In 1934, the Silver and Gold became known as the Buffaloes. CU students rented a buffalo calf to cheer the team on for the final football game that year, and the nickname has remained with the school.

=== The Frosty Cox era ===
The first coaching star for CU was Forrest B. "Frosty" Cox. Cox spent thirteen years on the sidelines from 1936 to 1950. In his second season with the school, the Buffaloes joined the Mountain States Conference, where they would proceed to win four MSC titles. Under Cox, the Buffs had quite a bit of success—both individually and as a team. Cox had four All-Americans during his time with the Buffs – Jack Harvey (1939 & 1940), Jim Willcoxon (1939), Bob Doll (1942), and Leason McCloud (1942). Cox led the team to three NCAA tournament bids and two NIT bids while in Boulder.

Arguably the greatest team in CU Basketball history was the 1940 squad, which was not only invited to the NCAA tournament but also to the NIT tournament. The Buffs won the more prestigious at the time NIT Tournament, which leads some to claim that the 1940 team were National Champs. In 1942, the Buffs lost in the Final Four to the Stanford Cardinals, which tied for the school's all-time best finish in that tournament.

In 1947, the Buffs left the Mountain States Conference and joined the Big Seven Conference. When Cox concluded his CU career, he had the best win–loss percentage (62.3%) of any CU coach who coached for at least three seasons.

=== "The Big Burd" rules the court ===
After Cox left CU, Horace "Bebe" Lee took over as the Buffs' head coach. He led the school to two NCAA Tournament bids, including a third-place finish in the 1955 NCAA tournament. However, the star of this era was Burdette "Burdie" Haldorson. Also known as "The Big Burd," Haldorson was arguably the best player in Colorado Men's Basketball history. An All-American whose number (#22) is retired at CU, Haldorson was named to the All-Big 7 Conference team two times and is also a member of the Basketball Hall of Fame, the Colorado Sports Hall of Fame, the University of Colorado Athletic Hall of Fame, and the Pac-12 Basketball Hall of Honor. He also won two gold medals with USA Basketball (1956 & 1960).

In 1955, Haldorson led the Big 7 Conference in scoring with 23.9 points per game as he led the Buffs to a third-place finish in the 1955 NCAA Tournament.

=== "Sox" Walseth leads the way ===
In 1956, CU named former player Russell "Sox" Walseth as their head coach. Walseth graduated from CU in 1948 as a three-time letterman in both basketball and baseball for the Buffaloes, and came back to coach after stints at High School (Bakersfield, California) and South Dakota State. "Sox" led the team to three Big 8 titles (the school joined the conference in 1958) and three NCAA tournament bids. In both the 1961–62 & 1962–63 seasons, the Buffs reached the second round of the NCAA tournament before being eliminated by Cincinnati.

"Sox" had two All-Americans while at CU—Ken Charlton (1963) and Cliff Meely (1971). Another key performer on the successful 1961–62 team, which beat Kansas to take the Big Eight Conference title before proceeding to the NCAA tournament, was Wilky Gilmore. Charlton and Gilmore were both named to the All Big-Eight team that year.

Somewhat later in Walseth's tenure as coach, another standout at Boulder was Scott Wedman – a sharp-shooting forward from Denver's Mullen High School. Wedman made a huge mark on the CU record books as he led the team in scoring and rebounding for two seasons, free throw percentage for one season, and field goal percentage all three years he played at CU. Those numbers placed him seventh in career scoring, sixth in rebounding, and eighth in field goal percentage in CU history at the time he left the school. He also was the highest draft pick in school history, going 2nd overall in the ABA Draft to the Memphis Sounds (he was also drafted 6th overall in the NBA draft by the KC-Omaha Kings). Wedman went on to play 12 years in the NBA.

When he retired after twenty seasons, "Sox" was the all-time winningest coach in CU history with a 261–245 record. Four years later, he came back to coach the women's team to a 77–21 record, including an incredible 43–0 home record, before retiring again. In 1996, the CU Event Center basketball court was named after him, so the Buffs all play on "Sox Walseth Court" now.

==== Cliff Meely ====
The star of the program under "Sox" Walseth was undoubtedly Cliff Meely. Walseth often called Meely "the most complete player" he had ever coached, and Meely set sixteen school records while playing for the Buffaloes and eight Big 8 Conference records.

Meely is the school's all-time leader in points and rebounds per game, and was named an All-American during the 1971 season. The list of accolades he received while in Boulder is numerous, but along with being an All-American, in 1969, he was named both Big 8 Player of the Year and Big 8 Sophomore of the Year. In fact, all three years he was at Colorado, he was named to the All-Big 8 First Team. Because of his dominant play, he was not only named to the 1970s Big 8 All-Decade First Team, but in 1996 he was named to the AP's All-time Big 8 Conference Basketball first team along with Wayman Tisdale (Oklahoma), Danny Manning (Kansas), Jo Jo White (Kansas) and Rolando Blackman (Kansas State).

Colorado has retired the #20 that he wore while in Boulder.

=== Individual talents lead the way ===
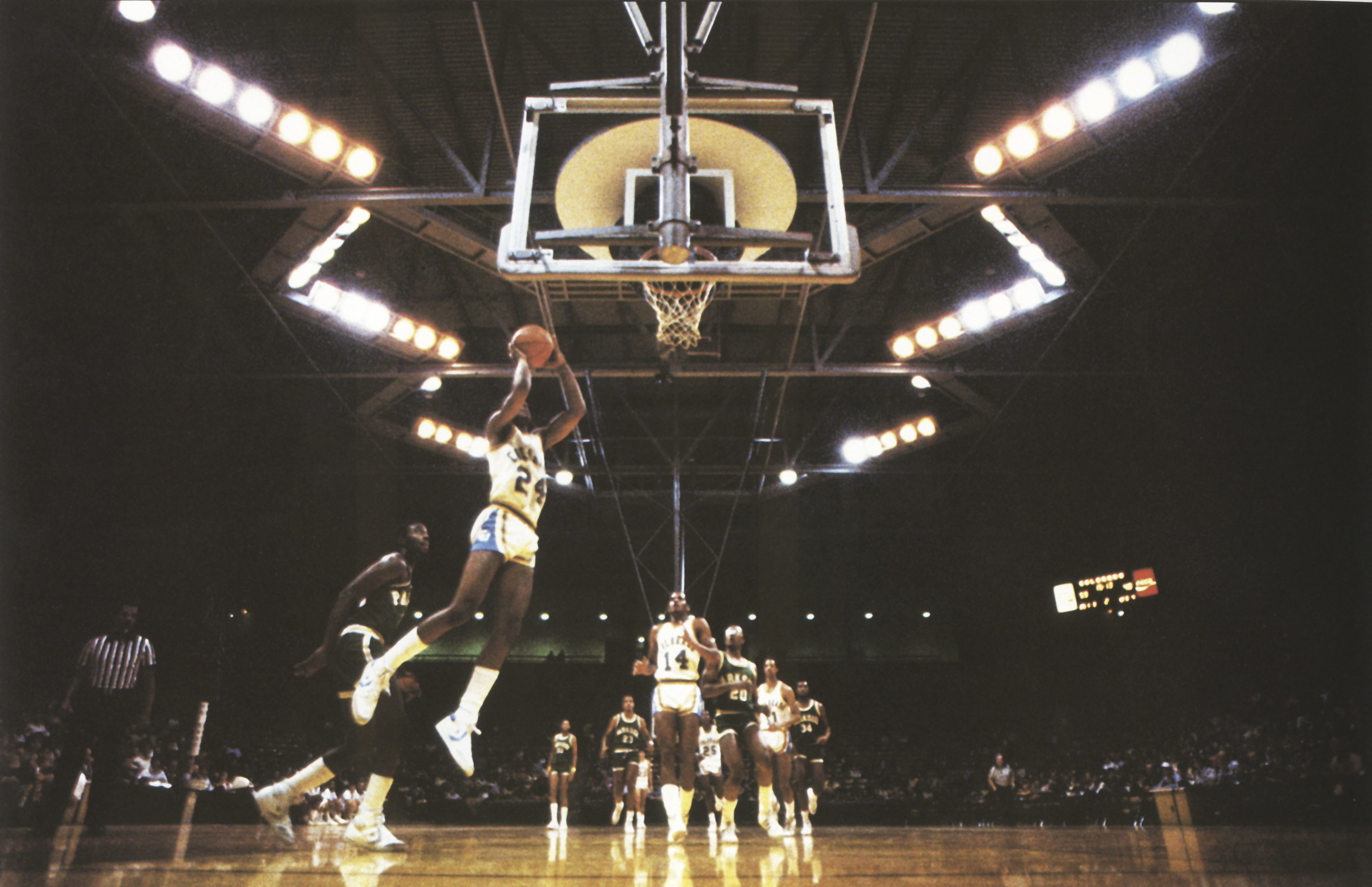
Against Wisconsin–Parkside in January 1982.

The lackluster results of Walseth's latter tenure would become the norm for Colorado over the next two decades. From 1977–78 to 1995–96, the Buffs would only have four winning seasons, and only once would they even get to .500 in Big Eight play.

While the Buffs struggled record-wise in the '80s and early '90s, they did have a few individual standouts that brought the team national attention. From 1980 to 1984, the Buffs were led by Jay Humphries, an exciting guard who made his mark all over CU's record book in just those three seasons. On offense, he became the school's all-time assist leader and also finished fourth all-time in scoring. Even with that, Humphries was best known for his defense. Humphries is the school's all-time leader in steals and led the nation in steals in 1982–83 with 115. Humphries was twice named Honorable Mention All-American (1982–83 & 1983–84) before being drafted by the Phoenix Suns with the thirteenth pick of the NBA draft. A teammate of Humphries in high school and at Colorado was post player Vince Kelley. Kelley also played with the Buffaloes from 1980 to 1984 and finished third all-time in career rebounds at CU. Kelley graduated in 1984 and played professionally in Australia and Portugal.

After starting out the '80s with talent like Humphries and Kelley, the Buffs found a way to round the decade out with two more stars to lead the team. Shaun Vandiver was a transfer from Hutchinson CC who only played three years in Boulder, but when it was all said & done, finished as the school's all-time leader in field goal percentage and was the school's second leading scorer & rebounder in history. For his work, he was named Honorable Mention All-American in 1989–90 and was named Big Eight tournament MVP from a losing team after leading the 8th-seeded Buffs to the Tournament Championship game before falling short – the first eight seed to ever make the championship game.

Vandiver wasn't alone on the team, though, as he had guard Stevie Wise there to help lead the way. Wise played 119 games for the Buffs, the fifth most in school history. He was known for being one of CU's all-time great 3-point specialists, and he has held numerous CU shooting marks. He finished his time as the number three scorer in school history and is still in the top 10 for assists in school history. Wise & Vandiver led the team on their run to the 1991 NIT Final Four. It was the school's first postseason appearance since 1969, and when it was said & done, they got to cut down the nets in front of a standing room only crowd at the Events Center before heading to the NIT Final Four in NYC, where they ended up third.

The next player to make his mark on the record books was Donnie Boyce. The Illinois product spent four years at CU, and when he left, he was the school's all-time leading scorer with 1,995 points. He was the first Buff to lead the team in scoring all four years at CU, and only the second Buff to ever do it. While Boyce was lighting it up, the team struggled. It appeared that Boyce was finally going to get to play in a postseason tournament in 1995, but he broke his leg in the opening round of the Big Eight tournament against Oklahoma. The team went on to earn an NIT bid–their first postseason bid of any sort since 1969–but he was unable to play.

=== The Chauncey Billups years ===
Chauncey Billups, is usually the first person that people think of when they think of Colorado basketball. The three-time winner of Colorado's Mr. Basketball award and a member of the McDonald's All-American team his senior year, the Denver native could have gone anywhere in the nation to play college ball. Even though it was obvious he wouldn't be staying for the entire four years due to a pro career calling his name, he had no shortage of suitors. With all of that, he decided to stay close to home and enroll at CU.

In his first year at Colorado, he set a school record for points scored by a freshman and was named to the Big 8 All-Freshman team as well as the All-Big 8 Conference Second Team and the Kansas City Star Big 8 team—an honor that was voted on by the players themselves. Unfortunately, Chauncey's first year in Boulder was filled only with individual accolades as the team underperformed and head coach Joe Harrington was relieved of duties. In his sophomore year, however, Chauncey was able to get the team going. Behind new head coach Ricardo Patton, and in a new conference (the Big 12 Conference), Chauncey at one point had led the Buffs to a 14–3 record and the #18 ranking in the nation. This team would make the Buffs' first NCAA Tournament appearance in 28 years, and notched their first winning conference record in 24 years. They would upset Indiana in the first round before losing to North Carolina in the second round. For his work, Chauncey was named not only to the All-Big 12 Conference First Team, but was named an All-American as well. Chauncey declared for the NBA draft, where he was picked third overall by the Boston Celtics, and he went on to play 17 years in the NBA.

=== The Buffs enter The Big 12 ===
Once Chauncey left, the Buffs were faced with a rough conference slate, but still managed to have some success behind head coach Ricardo Patton. Players such as Jaquay Walls (Big 12 All-Newcomer Team) and Jamahl Mosley helped lead the team to back-to-back NIT bids, but things started to improve once David Harrison showed up on campus for the 2001–02 season. Harrison was named to the Big 12 All-Freshman team and led the school in scoring, while also setting a school record with a field goal percentage of 63.8% – good enough for third nationally. Harrison had help though in the form of Stéphane Pelle. Pelle was the first player in 11 years to average a double-double, putting up 12.8 points and 10.8 rebounds per game in the 2001–02 season. The next season, with Harrison & Pelle down low and Michel Morandais coming in to form on the wing, the Buffs won 20 games and capped it off with an NCAA Tournament bid. They made the NIT the next season after Harrison left early to go into the NBA draft.

=== New all-time scoring leaders ===
Richard Roby stepped on the CU campus in 2004 and became the first freshman since Chauncey Billups to lead the team in scoring, and he ended up joining Donnie Boyce as the only Buffs to lead the team in scoring all four years on campus. In his sophomore season, Roby & the Buffs won 20 games and ended up in the NIT Tournament, while also being named to the All-Big 12 First Team. Unfortunately, he was faced with a freshman-laden team the next season, as there were eight first-year players (a school record) on the 2006–07 squad. The next season showed improvement and the Buffs became the first team in Big 12 history to be a 12 seed and upset a number 5 seed (Baylor) in the Big 12 Tournament. When he finally graduated from CU, he left the school as the all-time leading scorer with 2,001 points—a record that still stands to this day.

But it is a record that is shared, because during his senior year, he shared time on the floor with a freshman named Cory Higgins who would one day tie him as the school's all-time leading scorer. Higgins was more than just a scorer, though, as during his sophomore year he was one of only 13 players nationally to lead or finish second on his team in five major statistical categories—points, rebounds, assists, steals, and blocked shots. Higgins also found a way to rank nationally in steals, free-throw percentage, and scoring as well. For his junior year, Higgins got some more help with the arrival of freshman guard Alec Burks. Higgins & Burks became the first tandem to net over 500 points in the same season since the 1990–91 campaign and were rewarded as Higgins was named to the All-Big 12 Third Team, and Burks was named All-Big 12 Freshman of the Year.

=== The Tad Boyle era ===
Tad Boyle was named the 18th coach in University of Colorado men's basketball history on April 19, 2010. In his first season in Boulder, Boyle led the Buffs to a school-record 18 home wins and their highest Big 12 finish (t-5th) since 2005–06. CU ranked first in the Big 12 and fifth nationally in free-throw percentage (77.8) for the 2010–11 season. Boyle's efficient attack also ranked 12th nationally in scoring (79.6 ppg) and 19th nationally in field goal percentage (47.3).

Boyle earned National Coach of the Week honors (Hoops Report, Jan. 10–16) after leading the Buffs to a 3–0 conference start, including wins over No. 9/8 Missouri and No. 21/20 Kansas State. The win over the Wildcats gave CU its first road win over a nationally ranked opponent since defeating No. 20 Texas Tech in January 1997. For the season, CU defeated four ranked teams, including a comeback of 22 points down (ranking second all-time in school history) to upset No. 5/5 Texas, 91–89. Despite having a very solid season and getting to the semi-finals of the conference tournament, Boyle and the Buffs were snubbed of a bid in the NCAA tournament. CU ended up making it all the way to the NIT semi-finals but lost to Alabama.

In his second season at the helm, Tad faced an uphill battle, losing 4 starters, 78% of the scoring, and most notably, Alec Burks to the NBA (#12 overall pick to the Utah Jazz). He was able to turn all of this into his second 24-win season in a row, a Pac-12 tournament championship, and a trip to the NCAA Tournament as an #11 seed, where CU advanced to the round of 32 for the first time in 15 years after beating #6 seed UNLV 68–64 in Albuquerque. CU's magical run was ended by Baylor in the round of 32, but in just two seasons, Boyle became the most successful post-season coach in the history of Colorado Basketball.

=== The Men's Basketball Wall of Honor ===
The Men's Basketball Wall of Honor celebrates former Buffaloes who have achieved at least five years of service in the NBA or competed on the world stage as an Olympic Gold Medalist. The 10 current honorees that are displayed on the wall of honor are:

- Chauncey Billups (1995–97)
- Alec Burks (2009–11)
- Jim Davis (1961–64)
- Spencer Dinwiddie (2011–14)
- Burdette "Burdie" Haldorson (1951–55)
- Jay Humphries (1980–84)
- Cliff Meely (1968–71)
- Andre Roberson (2010–13)
- Scott Wedman (1971–74)
- Derrick White (2016–17)

== Coaching ==
=== Current staff ===
Position	Name
Head Coach:	Tad Boyle
Assistant Coach:	Bill Grier
Assistant Coach:	Danny Manning
Assistant Coach:	Nate Tomlinson
Assistant Coach:	Evan Battey
Assistant Coach:	Tyson Gilbert
Director of Operations:	Bill Cartun

=== Record by coach ===
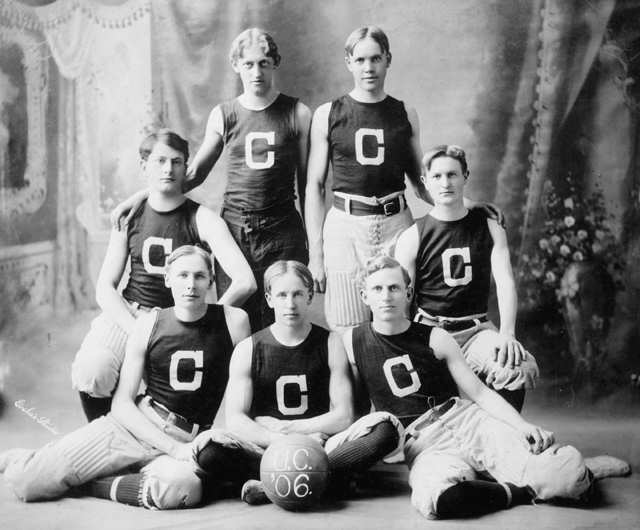
The men's basketball team in 1906.

Data through 2025–26 season
Coach	Years	Seasons	Won	Lost	Pct.	Conference Titles	NCAA¹	NIT¹
no coach	1902–1906	5	18	16	.529	5	–	–
Frank R. Castleman	1907–1912	6	32	22	.592	1	–	–
John McFadden	1913–1914	2	10	9	.526	2	–	–
James N. Ashmore	1915–1917	3	16	10	.615	1	–	–
Melbourne C. Evans	1918	1	9	2	.818	–	–	–
Joe Mills	1919–1924	6	30	24	.556	1	–	–
Howard Beresford	1925–1933	9	76	52	.594	–	–	–
Henry P. Iba	1934	1	9	8	.529	–	–	–
Earl “Dutch” Clark	1935	1	3	9	.250	–	–	–
Forrest B. Cox	1936– 1950	13	147	89	.623	4	3	2
H. B. Lee	1950–1956	6	63	74	.459	2	2	–
Russell “Sox” Walseth	1956– 1976	20	261	245	.516	3	3	–
Bill Blair	1976– 1981	5	67	69	.493	–	–	–
Tom Apke	1981– 1986	5	59	81	.421	–	–	–
Tom Miller	1986– 1990	4	35	79	.307	–	–	–
Joe Harrington	1990– 1996	6	72	85	.459	–	–	2
Ricardo Patton	1996–2007	12	184	160	.535	–	2	4
Jeff Bzdelik	2007–2010	3	36	58	.383	–	–	–
Tad Boyle	2010–present	16	329	220	.599	1	6	5
Totals		124	1,456	1,312	.526	20	16	13

¹ Invitations

== Players ==
=== Retired numbers ===
Colorado Buffaloes retired numbers
No.	Player	Career	Ref.
20	Cliff Meely	1968–1971	
22	Burdette Haldorson	1952–1955	

=== Career leaders ===
Career Scoring Leaders
Seasons	Player	Points
2007–11	Cory Higgins	2,001
2004–08	Richard Roby	2,001
1991–95	Donnie Boyce	1,995
1968–71	Cliff Meely	1,940
1988–91	Shaun Vandiver	1,876
2017–21	McKinley Wright IV	1,857
2011–15	Askia Booker	1,740
1987–91	Stevie Wise	1,727
2012–16	Josh Scott	1,709
1975–79	Emmett Lewis	1,680
1982–86	Randy Downs	1,566
2012–17	Xavier Johnson	1,463
2020–24	Tristan da Silva	1,456
2000–04	Michel Morandais	1,428
2021–24	KJ Simpson	1,424

Career Rebound Leaders
Seasons	Player	Rebounds
1999–03	Stephane Pelle	1,054
2010–13	Andre Roberson	1,045
2012–16	Josh Scott	974
1968–71	Cliff Meely	971
1988–91	Shaun Vandiver	962
2013–17	Wesley Gordon	882
1961–64	Jim Davis	863
2017–20	Tyler Bey	799
1980–84	Vince Kelley	730
1951–55	Burdette Haldorson	711
1974–78	Larry Vaculik	709
2001–04	David Harrison	707
2012–17	Xavier Johnson	705
1971–74	Scott Wedman	684
2013–18	George King	681

Career Assist Leaders
Seasons	Player	Assists
2017–21	McKinley Wright IV	683
1980–84	Jay Humphries	562
1982–86	Mike Reid	446
1998–01	Jose Winston	440
2003–08	Marcus Hall	423
1976–80	Toney Ellis	409
2008–12	Nate Tomlinson	405
1991–95	Donnie Boyce	405
2021–24	KJ Simpson	378
1987–91	Stevie Wise	377
2011–15	Askia Booker	334
1967–70	Gordon Tope	334
1990–92	Billy Low	321
2007–11	Cory Higgins	320
2000–04	Michel Morandais	294

Career Steals Leaders
Seasons	Player	Steals
1980–84	Jay Humphries	309
1991–95	Donnie Boyce	245
2007–11	Cory Higgins	192
1998–01	Jose Winston	179
1987–91	Stevie Wise	179
2004–08	Richard Roby	176
2010–13	Andre Roberson	164
2011–15	Askia Booker	155
1988–93	Randy Robinson	143
2017–21	McKinley Wright IV	140
2003–08	Marcus Hall	140
1982–85	Mike Reid	137
2021–24	KJ Simpson	129
2000–04	Blair Wilson	119
1990–92	Billy Low	114
1985–88	Michael Lee	114

Career Games played Leaders
Seasons	Player	Games
2008–12	Austin Dufault	136
2012–16	Xavier Talton	135
2011–15	Askia Booker	134
2018–22	Evan Battey	133
2007–11	Cory Higgins	132
2017–21	McKinley Wright IV	131
2013–17	Wesley Gordon	131
2017–20	Lucas Siewert	130
2017–21	D'Shawn Schwartz	129
2008–12	Nate Tomlinson	129
2013–18	George King	127
2012–17	Xavier Johnson	127
2020–24	Tristan da Silva	124
2012–16	Josh Scott	124
2007–11	Levi Knutson	123
1999–03	Stephane Pelle	123
1996–00	Will Smith	123

Career Minutes played Leaders
Seasons	Player	Minutes
2007–11	Cory Higgins	4,478
2017–21	McKinley Wright IV	4,339
1980–84	Jay Humphries	3,864
2011–15	Askia Booker	3,808
2004–08	Richard Roby	3,805
2012–16	Josh Scott	3,761
1987–91	Stevie Wise	3,586
2008–12	Nate Tomlinson	3,540
1991–95	Donnie Boyce	3,528
2008–12	Austin Dufault	3,439
2013–17	Wesley Gordon	3,405
2012–17	Xavier Johnson	3,387
1980–84	Vince Kelley	3,365
1982–86	Randy Downs	3,354
2020–24	Tristan da Silva	3,334

Career Blocks Leaders
Seasons	Player	Blocks
2001–04	David Harrison	225
2013–17	Wesley Gordon	204
2012–16	Josh Scott	162
1991–95	Ted Allen	161
2010–13	Andre Roberson	150
1991–93	Poncho Hodges	131
1968–71	Cliff Meely	123
1991-95	Donnie Boyce	114
2004–08	Marcus King-Stockton	111
2017–20	Tyler Bey	102
1988–91	Rodell Guest	98
2004–08	Richard Roby	92
1988–91	Shaun Vandiver	90
2002–06	Chris Copeland	88
1995–97	Martice Moore	85

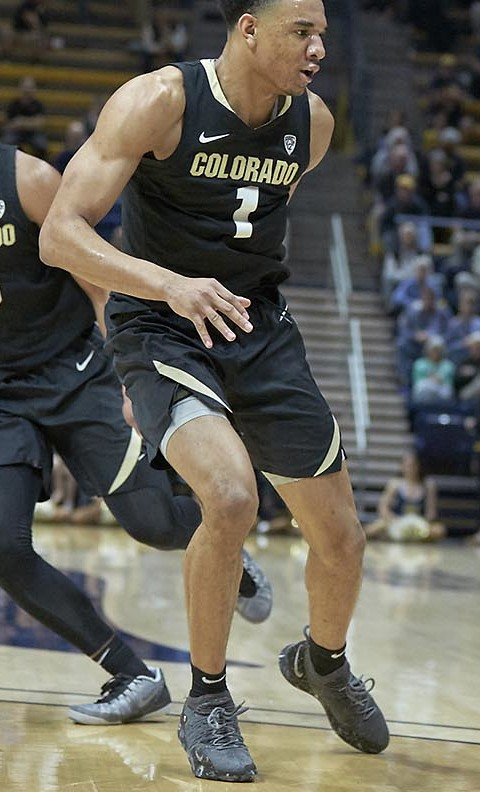
Tyler Bey

=== Individual awards ===
==== All-Americans ====
Player	Year(s)	Team(s)
Jack Harvey	1939	Madison Square Garden (1st)
Jack Harvey	1940	Consensus Second Team – Converse (1st)
Bob Doll	1942	Consensus Second Team – Pic (1st), Madison Square Garden (2nd)
Leason McCloud	1942	Madison Square Garden (1st)
Ken Charlton	1963	USBWA (1st)
Cliff Meely	1971	AP (3rd), USBWA (2nd), NABC (4th)
Chauncey Billups	1997	Consensus Second Team – AP (2nd), USBWA (2nd), NABC (2nd)

==== Conference honors ====
1970's Big 8 Conference All-Decade Team

- Cliff Meely – First Team

Big 8 Conference Player of the Year

- 1969 – Cliff Meely

Big XII Conference First Team

- 2000 – Jaquay Walls

Big XII Conference Freshman of the Year

- 2010 – Alec Burks

Pac-12 Conference Defensive Player of the Year

- 2013 – Andre Roberson

Pac-12 Conference First Team

- 2012 & 2013 – Andre Roberson
- 2013 – Spencer Dinwiddie
- 2014 & 2016 – Josh Scott
- 2017 – Derrick White
- 2019 – Tyler Bey
- 2019, 2020, & 2021 – McKinley Wright IV
- 2022 – Jabari Walker
- 2023 – Tristan da Silva
- 2024 – KJ Simpson

Pac-12 Conference Second Team

- 2012 – Carlon Brown
- 2015 – Askia Booker
- 2018 – George King
- 2020 – Tyler Bey
- 2022 – Evan Battey
- 2023 – KJ Simpson
- 2024 – Tristan da Silva

Pac-12 Conference Most Improved Player

- 2019 – Tyler Bey

== Buffs in the NBA ==
=== NBA Draft picks ===
Name	Round	Overall pick	Year	Team
Chauncey Billups	1	3	1997	Boston Celtics
Tom Harrold	1	4	1955	Fort Wayne Pistons
Scott Wedman	1	6	1974	Kansas City-Omaha Kings
Cliff Meely	1	7	1971	San Diego Rockets
Cody Williams	1	10	2024	Utah Jazz
Alec Burks	1	12	2011	Utah Jazz
Jay Humphries	1	13	1984	Phoenix Suns
Tristan da Silva	1	18	2024	Orlando Magic
Shaun Vandiver	1	25	1991	Golden State Warriors
Andre Roberson	1	26	2013	Minnesota Timberwolves
Pat Frink	3	27	1968	Cincinnati Royals
Derrick White	1	29	2017	San Antonio Spurs
David Harrison	1	29	2004	Indiana Pacers
Tyler Bey	2	36	2020	Dallas Mavericks
Spencer Dinwiddie	2	38	2014	Detroit Pistons
KJ Simpson	2	42	2024	Charlotte Hornets
Donnie Boyce	2	42	1995	Atlanta Hawks
Jaquay Walls	2	56	2000	Indiana Pacers
Jabari Walker	2	57	2022	Portland Trail Blazers
George King	2	59	2018	Phoenix Suns
Jim Creighton	3	39	1972	Seattle SuperSonics
Alex Stivrins	4	75	1985	Seattle SuperSonics
Jim Davis	4	29	1964	Detroit Pistons
Burdette Haldorson	4	23	1955	St. Louis Hawks
Ken Charlton	4	32	1963	Cincinnati Royals
Joe Cooper	5	96	1981	New Jersey Nets
Chuck Williams	6	77	1968	Philadelphia 76ers
Rob Gonzalez	7	147	1983	Detroit Pistons
Jo Jo Hunter	7	146	1981	Milwaukee Bucks
Jacques Tuz	8	173	1982	San Diego Clippers
Chuck Gardner	9	81	1966	Baltimore Bullets
Dave Logan	9	14	1976	Kansas City Kings
Lee Haven	9	146	1974	Portland Trail Blazers
Wayne Tucker	9	80	1951	Tri-Cities Blackhawks
Larry Vaculik	9	168	1978	Denver Nuggets
Emmett Lewis	10	181	1979	Denver Nuggets
Brian Johnson	10	212	1981	Phoenix Suns
Wilky Gilmore	14	98	1962	St. Louis Hawks

=== Buffs in the NBA ===
Name	Seasons as a Buffalo	NBA Accomplishments
Tyler Bey	2017–20	36th pick of the 2020 NBA draft by the Dallas Mavericks.
Chauncey Billups	1995–97	Five Time NBA All-Star, NBA Champion, NBA Finals MVP. Currently the head coach of the Portland Trail Blazers.
Donnie Boyce	1991–95	Played for the Atlanta Hawks & San Antonio Spurs over three seasons.
Matt Bullard	1985–87	NBA Champion who played for the Houston Rockets & Atlanta Hawks.
Alec Burks	2009–11	2011 Lottery pick of the Utah Jazz. Currently plays for the Miami Heat.
Chris Copeland	2002–06	Played for the New York Knicks, Indiana Pacers & Milwaukee Bucks.
Jim Creighton	1969–72	Drafted by Seattle SuperSonics. Played one season with Atlanta Hawks.
Jim Davis	1961–64	Played for the St Louis/Atlanta Hawks, Houston Rockets & Detroit Pistons.
Tristan da Silva	2020–24	18th overall pick of the 2024 NBA draft by the Orlando Magic
Spencer Dinwiddie	2011–14	38th overall pick in the 2014 Draft. Currently plays for Dallas Mavericks.
Bob Doll	1939–42	Played for the St Louis Bombers of the BAA and the Boston Celtics of the NBA.
Pat Frink	1964–68	Played with the Cincinnati Royals of the ABA for one season.
Chuck Gardner	1963–66	Played with the Denver Rockets of the ABA for one season.
David Harrison	2001–04	First round draft pick who played four seasons with the Indiana Pacers.
Cory Higgins	2007–11	Played for the Charlotte Bobcats during the 2011–12 season.
Jay Humphries	1980–84	First round draft pick of the Phoenix Suns who spent 11 seasons in the NBA.
George King	2013–18	Drafted by the Phoenix Suns in the 2018 NBA draft.
Cliff Meely	1968–71	Played with the Houston Rockets & Los Angeles Lakers for five years in the NBA.
Andre Roberson	2011–13	2013 First round draft pick. Made All-Defensive Second Team in 2017. Last played for the Oklahoma City Thunder.
Alex Stivrins	1983–85	Played in the NBA for two years.
Scott Wedman	1971–74	Two-time NBA champion and NBA All-Star.
Derrick White	2015–17	29th pick of the 2017 NBA draft by the San Antonio Spurs. Currently plays for the Boston Celtics. 2024 NBA Champion.
Chuck Williams	1965–68	Played for 8 seasons in both the NBA and ABA.
Cody Williams	2023–24	2024 Lottery pick of the Utah Jazz

== Buffs in international leagues ==
- Tyler Bey (born 1998), in the Philippine Basketball Association
- George King (born 1994), in the Israeli Basketball Premier League
- Marcus Relphorde (born 1988), in the Israeli National League

== Conference tournament history ==
=== Big Eight Conference tournament ===
The Buffs went 4–20 in the Big Eight Conference tournament during their time in the conference. Their best performance came in the 1990 season when they became the first #8 seed to make the conference championship game before falling to Oklahoma in the championship match. For their effort, Shaun Vandiver was named Tournament MVP despite being on the losing team.

=== Big 12 Conference tournament ===
In their fifteen seasons in the Big 12, the Buffs managed to go 9–15 in Conference tournament play. Despite not winning a conference championship, they do have two successful claims to fame during their time. The first one was in 2008 when the Buffs became the first #12 seed to upset a #5 seed as they beat Baylor in the opening round. The other one was during their last year in the conference when they beat Iowa State in the opening round and followed that up with their third win of the season over Kansas State before falling just short to Kansas in the semifinals.

=== Pac-12 Conference tournament ===
Year	Record	Result
2012	4–0	Pac-12 Champions
2013	1–1	Lost in Quarterfinals
2014	2–1	Lost in Semifinals
2015	1–1	Lost in Quarterfinals
2016	1–1	Lost in Quarterfinals
2017	1–1	Lost in Quarterfinals
2018	1–1	Lost in Quarterfinals
2019	2–1	Lost in Semifinals
2020	0–1	Lost in First Round
2021	2–1	Lost in Championship
2022	1–1	Lost in Semifinals
2023	1–1	Lost in Quarterfinals
2024	2–1	Lost in Championship

==== 2012 Pac-12 Tournament champions ====
The Buffs won their first conference tournament championship in 2012, their first year in the Pac-12 conference. Led by tournament MVP Carlon Brown, the 6th–seeded Buffs won four games in four days to bring the championship back to Boulder and earn an invitation to the 2012 NCAA tournament, where they would go on to beat UNLV in the second round before losing to Baylor in the third round.

Date	Score	TV
3/7/12	Colorado 53, Utah 41	FSN
3/8/12	Colorado 63, Oregon 62	FSN
3/9/12	Colorado 70, California 59	FSN
3/10/12	Colorado 53, Arizona 51	CBS

== Postseason results ==
=== NCAA tournament results ===
The Buffaloes have appeared in the NCAA Tournament 16 times, with a combined record of 13–18.

Year	Seed	Round	Opponent	Result/Score
1940		Elite Eight; Regional 3rd Place	USC; Rice	L, 32–38; L, 56–60 ^{OT}
1942		Elite Eight; Final Four	Kansas; Stanford	W, 46–44; L, 35–46
1946		Elite Eight; Regional 3rd Place	California; Baylor	L, 44–50; W, 59–44
1954		Sweet Sixteen; Regional 3rd Place	Bradley; Rice	L, 64–76; L, 55–78
1955		Sweet Sixteen; Elite Eight; Final Four; National 3rd Place	Tulsa; Bradley; San Francisco; Iowa	W, 69–59; W, 93–81; L, 50–62; W, 75–54
1962		Sweet Sixteen; Elite Eight	Texas Tech; Cincinnati	W, 67–60; L, 46–73
1963		Sweet Sixteen; Elite Eight	Oklahoma City; Cincinnati	W, 78–72; L, 60–67
1969		Sweet Sixteen; Regional 3rd Place	Colorado State; Texas A&M	L, 56–64; W, 97–82
1997	9 E	Round of 64; Round of 32	(8) Indiana (1) #4 North Carolina	W, 80–62; L, 56–73
2003	10 S	Round of 64	(7) Michigan State	L, 64–79
2012	11 S	Round of 64; Round of 32	(6) #23 UNLV (3) #9 Baylor	W, 68–64; L, 63–80
2013	10 E	Round of 64	(7) Illinois	L, 49–57
2014	8 S	Round of 64	(9) Pittsburgh	L, 48–77
2016	8 S	Round of 64	(9) Connecticut	L, 67–74
2021	5 E	Round of 64; Round of 32	(12) Georgetown (4) #14 Florida State	W, 96–73; L, 53–71
2024	10 S	First Four; Round of 64; Round of 32	(10) Boise State (7) Florida (2) Marquette	W, 60–53; W, 102–100; L, 77–81

=== NIT ===
The Buffaloes have appeared in the National Invitation Tournament (NIT) 13 times. Their combined record is 14–12. They were NIT Champions in 1940.

Year	Round	Opponent	Result
1938	Semifinals; Championship Game	New York University; Temple	W, 48–47; L, 34–60
1940	Semifinals; Championship Game	DePaul; Duquesne	W, 52–37; W, 51–40
1991	First Round; Second Round; Quarterfinals; Semifinals; 3rd Place Game	Michigan; Wyoming; Arkansas State; Oklahoma; Massachusetts	W, 71–64; W, 83–75; W, 81–75; L, 78–88; W, 98–91
1995	First Round	New Mexico	L, 83–98
1999	First Round; Second Round	Pepperdine; Colorado State	W, 65–61; L, 78–86
2000	First Round	Southern Illinois	L, 94–92
2004	First Round	Oregon	L, 72–77 ^{OT}
2006	First Round	Old Dominion	L, 61–79
2011	First Round; Second Round; Quarterfinal; Semifinals	Texas Southern; California; Kent State; Alabama	W, 88–74; W, 89–72; W, 81–74; L, 61–62
2017	First Round	UCF	L, 74–79
2019	First Round; Second Round; Quarterfinals	Dayton; Norfolk State; Texas	W, 78–73; W, 76–60; L, 55–68
2022	First Round	St. Bonaventure	L, 68–76
2023	First Round; Second Round	Seton Hall; Utah Valley	W, 65–64; L, 69–81

=== CBI ===
The Buffaloes have appeared in the College Basketball Invitational (CBI) one time. Their record is 1–1.

Year	Round	Opponent	Result
2015	First Round; Quarterfinals	Gardner-Webb; Seattle	W, 87–78; L, 62–75

=== CBC ===
Colorado has appeared in the College Basketball Crown twice. Their overall record is 0–2.

Year	Round	Opponent	Result
2025	First Round	Villanova	L, 64–85
2026	Quarterfinals	Oklahoma	L, 86–90^{OT}

== Record vs. Big 12 opponents ==
The Colorado Buffaloes have the following all-time series records against Big 12 opponents.

Opponent	Wins	Losses	Pct.	Streak
Arizona	16	28	.364	Arizona 6
Arizona State	18	12	.600	Colorado 2
Baylor	16	12	.571	Baylor 1
BYU	17	8	.680	BYU 3
Cincinnati	1	9	.100	Cincinnati 2
Houston	3	6	.333	Houston 3
Iowa State	70	82	.461	Iowa State 5
Kansas	40	126	.241	Kansas 4
Kansas State	49	97	.336	Colorado 1
Oklahoma State	49	63	.438	Oklahoma State 1
TCU	5	3	.625	Colorado 3
Texas Tech	18	16	.529	Texas Tech 3
UCF	2	3	.400	UCF 1
Utah	36	31	.537	Colorado 2
West Virginia	1	2	.333	West Virginia 1

- Note all-time series includes non-conference matchups.

== Facilities and fans ==
=== CU Events Center ===
The CU Events Center is an 11,064-seat multi-purpose arena on the Boulder main campus of the University of Colorado. The arena opened in 1979, and is home to the Colorado Buffaloes men's and women's basketball teams and the CU volleyball team. The CEC opened in 1979, and the first game played there was the CU Men's Basketball team hosting the USSR basketball team. The largest crowd ever to witness a game was on December 5, 2012, when 11,708 people watched CU play CSU (CU won the game 70–61). The facility has also hosted its fair share of concerts, as Bob Dylan, U2, and Stevie Wonder are some of the artists to have performed there.

The facility was originally named the CU Events/Conference Center and cost $7.7 million to build. In September 1990, it was renamed the Coors Event Center to honor a $5 million gift from the Adolph Coors Foundation. In 2018, the name was changed to the CU Events Center.

=== Practice facility ===
In the fall of 2011, the school opened the doors on a new practice facility that is next to the CU Event Center. This provides locker rooms and practice courts for the men's and women's basketball teams as well as the women's volleyball team. The facility is 43,000 square feet and cost $10.8 million to build, all from private funds. Each of the two practice courts is 11,000 square feet and is a replica of the CU Event Center, down to the lines and logos. The school also took extra care to make sure that the facility matches the other 200-plus buildings on campus by using sandstone and red-tiled roofs.

The facility is also one of two athletic facilities to be given LEED Platinum Certification, which is the highest possible by the internationally recognized system developed by the US Green Building Council. The facility is estimated to be 40% more energy efficient and 30% more water efficient than similar buildings.

=== C-Unit ===
The student section for CU Basketball is referred to as the C-Unit. A grassroots organization that was started by some students in 2004, the C-Unit has gone on to receive tons of praise for their ability to cheer the Buffs on. They received national attention when the school sent fifty members to Los Angeles for the 2012 Pac-12 Tournament, and then upon getting a bid to the NCAA Tournament, the school sent 100 of them to The Pit in Albuquerque to cheer the team on in their victory over UNLV in the second round of the tournament. The C-Unit, combined with the large number of CU fans who followed the team down for the weekend, turned The Pit into "Coors Event Center South".
