= Marcus Hall (basketball) =

American basketball player (born 1985)

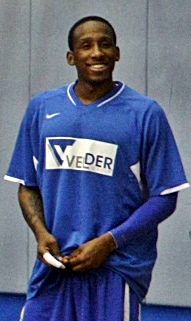
- Hall during his second tenure with Levski Sofia

No. 1 – Heartfire
- Position: Point guard / shooting guard
- League: The Basketball Tournament

Personal information
- Born: August 6, 1985 (age 41) Houston, Texas, U.S.
- Listed height: 6 ft 2 in (1.88 m)
- Listed weight: 188 lb (85 kg)

Career information
- High school: Jersey Village (Houston, Texas)
- College: Colorado (2003–2008)
- NBA draft: 2008: undrafted
- Playing career: 2008–present

Career history
- 2008–2009: Levski Sofia
- 2009: Fastweb Casale
- 2010: APOEL
- 2010–2011: Kepez Belediyespor
- 2011–2012: Levski Sofia
- 2012–2013: Darüşşafaka
- 2013–2014: Yeşilgiresun Belediye
- 2014–2015: Fort Wayne Mad Ants
- 2015: Iowa Energy
- 2015–2016: Afyonkarahisar Belediyespor
- 2017: Bucaneros de La Guaira
- 2017: Byblos Club
- 2018: Istanbulspor
- 2018–2019: Konyaspor
- 2020–2021: Manisa Basket
- 2021–present: Team 23/Heartfire

Career highlights
- TBT Tournament Champion (2023); TBT All-Tournament (2016, 2023); TBT Tournament MVP (2016); Turkish TBL Third-Team (2019); Turkish TBL Honorable Mention (2014, 2016); Turkish TBL Second-Team (2013); Turkish TBL First-Team (2011); Balkan League Imports-Team (2009, 2012); Balkan League Honorable Ment. (2009, 2012); Bulgarian League All-Star (2009, 2012); Bulgarian League First-Team (2009); Bulgarian League MVP (2009); Bulgarian League Cup Champion (2009); Bulgarian League Scoring Champ (22.3ppg) (2009)

Marcus Anthony Hall (born August 6, 1985) is an American professional basketball player for Heartfire of The Basketball Tournament. The 6'2" guard played college basketball for the University of Colorado.

== High school career ==
Hall attended Jersey Village High School in Houston, Texas where he was a three-time winner of Jersey Village's best offensive player and was a two-time all-district and school's most valuable player as a junior and senior. In addition to basketball in high school, Hall was a standout performer on the track, earning all-district champion honors in the high jump, 300 hurdles, 4×400 meters and 4×100 relay.

== College career ==
In his freshman season at Colorado, Hall played in all 29 games and had six starting assignments. He averaged 5.0 points, 1.3 rebounds and 1.6 assists in 15.1 minutes per game.

In his sophomore season, Hall played in all 29 games and had 21 starting assignments. He was one of three players that averaged over double-digits as he was third in team scoring (11.2 ppg) and first in assists (4.4 apg). He was also second in field goals made (118), third in starts (21), fourth in three-pointers (38).

In his junior season, Hall played in all 30 games and had 23 starting assignments. He was the team leader in assists (124) at 4.1 per game and finished sixth in all games played among Big 12 players. He was the third on the team in scoring averaging 8.7 points per game while also averaging 2.6 rebounds and 1.3 steals per game.

After redshirting the 2006–07 season, Hall returned for the Buffaloes in 2007–08 where he started all 32 games. He averaged 14.0 points, 3.9 rebounds, 4.0 assists and 1.8 steals in 37.6 minutes per game. He became the 26th Colorado player to score 1,000 career points and finished fourth all-time in assists (423). He also finished tied for third in career games played (120) and graduated from Colorado with a double major in sociology and ethnic studies.

== Professional career ==
After going undrafted in the 2008 NBA draft, Hall joined the New York Knicks for the 2008 NBA Summer League where he averaged 4.3 points, 1.5 rebounds and 2.0 assists in four games. On September 19, 2008, he signed a one-year deal with Levski Sofia of the Bulgarian National Basketball League.

On July 21, 2009, Hall signed a two-year deal with Fastweb Casale of the Lega Basket Serie A. In December 2009, he left Casale after 13 games. In February 2010, he joined APOEL of Cyprus but left after just one EuroChallenge game. Later that month, he signed with Kepez Belediyespor of Turkey for the rest of the 2009–10 season. He later re-signed with Belediyespor for the 2010–11 season.

On August 25, 2011, Hall returned to Levski Sofia, signing with the club for the 2011–12 season.

In September 2012, Hall signed with Darüşşafaka of Turkey for the 2012–13 season.

In September 2013, Hall signed with Yeşilgiresun Belediye for the 2013–14 season.

On November 1, 2014, Hall was selected by the Fort Wayne Mad Ants in the fourth round of the 2014 NBA Development League Draft. On February 19, 2015, he was released by the Mad Ants. On March 17, he was acquired by the Iowa Energy. On July 8, he returned to Turkey, this time with Afyonkarahisar Belediyespor.

=== The Basketball Tournament (TBT) (2015–present) ===
In the summer of 2016, in The Basketball Tournament on ESPN Marcus lead Team Colorado (Colorado Alumni) to the finals as the West Regional Champs, and ended up losing the $2 million prize in the final seconds to Overseas Elite 77–72. Hall was voted the 2016 TBT MVP on twitter. He averaged 24.6 points per game. In the summer of 2017, he averaged 28.3 points per game. Hall also shot 82 percent on the foul line. As a No. 1 seed in the West Region, Hall helped take Team Colorado to the Super 16 Round, but was defeated by Armored Athlete 84–75. As of summer 2021 he is the all-time leader TBT history in points and Top 10 in 3 pointers made.

== Career statistics ==
Legend
GP	Games played	GS	Games started	MPG	Minutes per game
FG%	Field goal percentage	3P%	3-point field goal percentage	FT%	Free throw percentage
RPG	Rebounds per game	APG	Assists per game	SPG	Steals per game
BPG	Blocks per game	PPG	Points per game	**Bold**	Career high

=== National leagues ===
Year	Team	GP	GS	MPG	FG%	3P%	FT%	RPG	APG	SPG	BPG	PPG
2008–09	Levski Sofia	35	32	33.9	**.60**	.35	.74	4.1	4.1	1.5	.3	**21.9**
2009–10	Fastweb Casale	13	13	32.8	.50	.29	.74	3.7	2.5	1.6	**.9**	12.6
2009–10	Kepez Belediyespor	8	3	30.5	.46	.30	.56	3.6	3.8	2.0	.1	13.3
2010–11	Kepez Belediyespor	20	19	35.0	.48	.34	.69	4.9	6.0	**2.8**	.6	20.1
2011–12	Levski Sofia	**36**	32	27.2	**.60**	.31	.71	3.0	3.4	1.4	.2	14.4
2012–13	Darüşşafaka	34	34	33.2	.49	.33	.74	4.6	4.9	1.1	.4	17.1
2013–14	Yeşilgiresun Belediye	34	34	**35.2**	.52	.31	.77	3.7	4.7	1.5	.5	19.4
2014–15	Iowa Energy	10	10	33.9	.48	**.36**	.79	4.9	3.6	1.2	.2	12.3
2015–16	Afyon Belediye S.K.	35	34	**35.3**	.56	.31	.74	4.6	5.8	1.5	.3	20.1
2017–18	Byblos	9	9	35.2	.46	.22	.77	3.8	**6.2**	1.6	.7	19.2
2017–18	Istanbulspor	16	16	33.3	.43	.28	**.87**	4.2	4.2	1.3	.3	17.9
2018–19	Konyaspor	**36**	**36**	34.1	.50	.34	.76	**5.7**	5.7	1.7	.3	19.8
2020–21	Manisa Basket	27	22	31.2	.51	.30	.78	3.2	4.6	1.4	.2	16.8
Career		313	294	33.1	.53	.33	.78	4.1	5.0	1.5	.3	17.8

=== Balkan League ===
Year	Team	GP	GS	MPG	FG%	3P%	FT%	RPG	APG	SPG	BPG	PPG
2008–09	Levski Sofia	**10**	**10**	**33.9**	**.60**	**.35**	**.74**	**4.7**	**3.9**	**1.6**	.3	**20.4**
2011–12	Levski Sofia	**10**	**10**	32.1	.55	.26	.66	3.8	3.8	.8	.3	15.0
Career		20	20	33.0	.58	.31	.70	4.3	3.9	1.2	.3	17.7

== Personal life ==
Hall is the son of Kenneth Hogan and Mary Hall, and has a younger sister, Kimberly. His cousin, Tim Simon, played basketball at Stephen F. Austin State University.
