= Richard Roby =

American basketball player (born 1985)

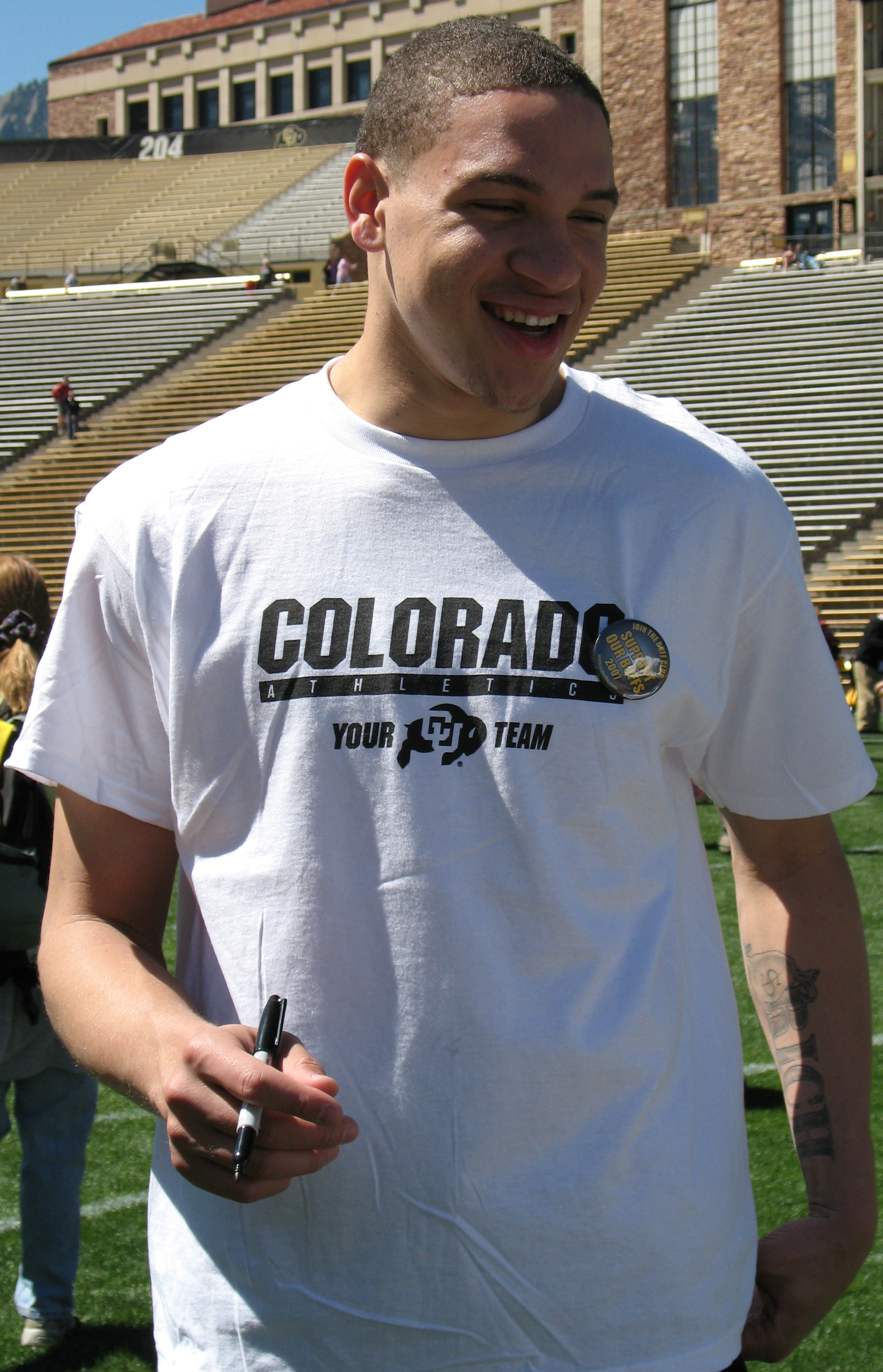
- Roby as a member of Colorado in 2007

Personal information
- Born: September 28, 1985 (age 41) San Bernardino, California, U.S.
- Listed height: 6 ft 5 in (1.96 m)
- Listed weight: 190 lb (86 kg)

Career information
- High school: Lawrence Academy (Groton, Massachusetts)
- College: Colorado (2004–2008)
- NBA draft: 2008: undrafted
- Playing career: 2008–2019
- Position: Shooting guard

Career history
- 2008–2009: Bnei Hasharon
- 2009–2010: Maccabi Haifa
- 2010: Halcones Rojos Veracruz
- 2010–2011: Rio Grande Valley Vipers
- 2011: Peristeri
- 2012: Fos Ouest Provence
- 2012: Estudiantes de Bahía Blanca
- 2012–2013: Wonju Dongbu Promy
- 2013: Gaiteros del Zulia
- 2013: Caciques de Humacao
- 2013–2016: Akita Northern Happinets
- 2016: SAN-EN NeoPhoenix
- 2016–2017: Osaka Evessa
- 2017: Marinos de Anzoátegui
- 2018: Soles de Mexicali
- 2018-2019: Shinshu Brave Warriors

Career highlights
- 2× bj league Best Five (2014, 2015); bj league All-Star (2015); bj league Best Sixth Man (2014)

Richard Roby (born September 28, 1985) is an American professional basketball player who last played for the Shinshu Brave Warriors of the Japanese B.League. He attended high school at Lawrence Academy at Groton, Massachusetts. Roby attended the University of Colorado at Boulder and played for the Buffaloes from 2004 to 2008. He averaged 17 points and 5.5 rebounds during his career for the Buffaloes. He graduated as Colorado's all-time leading scorer, doing so in his final collegiate game.. In December of 2025 he was convicted of two counts of battery against his wife Kendrea Roby in Las Vegas Justice Court

== Professional career ==
Roby played for the Nuggets in the NBA Summer League in 2010.

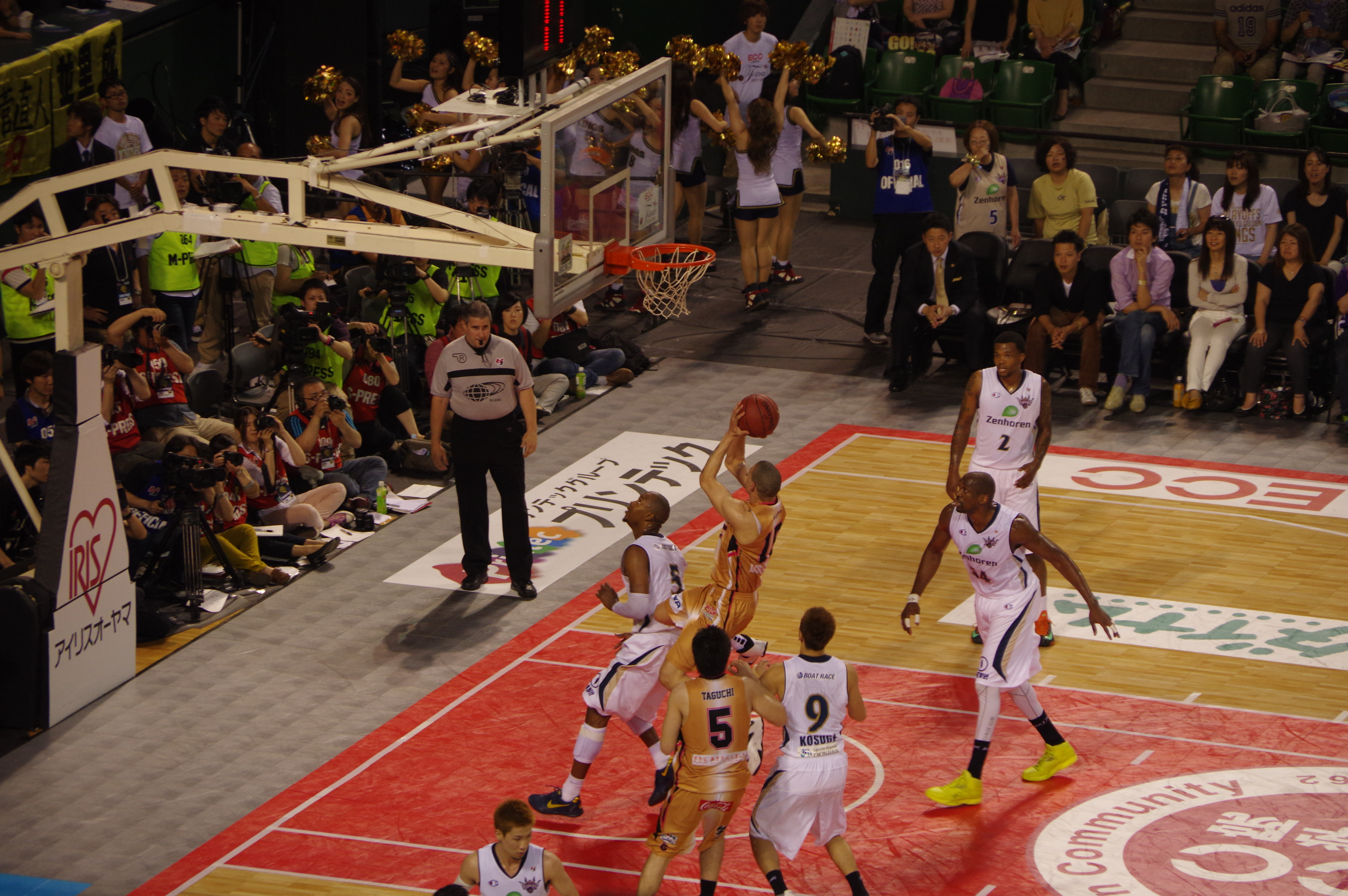
Roby scoring at bj league finals

"Akita star" played for the Akita Northern Happinets of Japan in 2013-16 and won bj league Eastern Conference championship title for two years in a row. He also acquired his Japanese driver's license in Wariyama, Akita.

=== The Basketball Tournament (TBT) (2017–present) ===
In the summer of 2017, Roby played in The Basketball Tournament on ESPN for Team Colorado (Colorado Alumni). He competed for the $2 million prize, and for Team Colorado and as a No. 1 seed in the West Region, Roby helped take Team Colorado to the Super 16 Round, but was defeated by Armored Athlete 84–75.

== College statistics ==
Year	Team	GP	GS	MPG	FG%	3P%	FT%	RPG	APG	SPG	BPG	PPG
2004–05	Colorado	30	30	30.8	.445	.374	.728	4.8	1.9	1.6	0.8	16.0
2005–06	Colorado	30	29	30.2	.422	.356	.736	3.9	2.5	2.1	0.9	17.0
2006–07	Colorado	27	25	32.1	.383	.268	.734	5.1	2.2	1.2	0.4	17.3
2007–08	Colorado	32	32	34.7	.477	.382	.764	6.7	2.1	1.0	1.0	17.0
Career		119	116	32.0	.431	.347	.742	5.5	2.2	1.5	0.8	16.8

=== NCAA Awards & Honors ===
- All-Big 12 First Team - 2006
- All-Big 12 Third Team - 2008
- All-Big 12 Honorable Mention - 2005, 2007
- Big 12 All-Freshman Team (Media) - 2005

== Career statistics ==
Legend
GP	Games played	GS	Games started	MPG	Minutes per game
FG%	Field goal percentage	3P%	3-point field goal percentage	FT%	Free throw percentage
RPG	Rebounds per game	APG	Assists per game	SPG	Steals per game
BPG	Blocks per game	PPG	Points per game	**Bold**	Career high

=== NBA Summer League Stats ===
Year	Team	GP	GS	MPG	FG%	3P%	FT%	RPG	APG	SPG	BPG	PPG
2008–09	NJN	2	0	4.8	.200	.000	.000	0.0	0.5	0.5	0.0	1.0
2009–10	OKC	2	0	6.2	.200	.000	.000	0.0	0.0	1.0	0.0	0.0
2010–11	DEN	5	4	21.9	.324	.200	.444	3.4	1.0	0.4	0.0	6.8
Career		9	4	14.6	.283	.167	.444	2.0	0.7	0.5	0.0	4.0

=== Regular season ===
Year	Team	GP	GS	MPG	FG%	3P%	FT%	RPG	APG	SPG	BPG	PPG
2008–09	Bnei	5	2	21.7	47.9	20.0	**82.6**	2.40	1.60	0.60	0.00	13.60
2009–10	Maccabi Haifa	20		17.7	52.4	29.0	55.2	2.6	1.3	0.9	0.2	8.9
2010–11	Rio Grande	50	31	27.8	47.0	32.0	66.5	4.54	2.04	1.30	0.62	15.50
2011–12	Peristeri	8	8	28.9	53.8	25.0	75.0	4.75	0.62	1.12	0.38	16.38
2011–12	Fos Ouest	17	11	25.6	53.3	40.5	67.3	3.65	1.76	1.47	0.47	12.59
2012–13	Estudiantes	15	14	**35.4**	49.8	43.1	78.5	3.93	1.13	1.13	0.60	18.47
2012–13	Wonju	40	11	16.0	51.8	30.5	65.5	3.23	1.00	0.80	0.57	11.43
2012–13	Gaiteros	19	19	30.1	52.5	31.6	70.9	4.74	2.11	1.63	0.53	15.89
2012–13	Humacao	4	1	16.3	37.0	12.5	50.0	3.75	1.50	1.00	0.75	6.50
2013–14	Akita	50	5	27.4	46.1	27.5	70.2	5.2	2.5	1.9	0.9	**20.1**
2014–15	Akita	**51**	**47**	30.3	**53.9**	32.9	56.0	7.2	**4.3**	**2.3**	**1.1**	20.0
2015–16	Akita	47	**47**	31.6	47.2	33.9	62.5	**8.0**	3.7	1.9	0.9	19.9
2016–17	San-en	14	9	18.9	34.6	24.4	65.2	5.6	1.4	1.2	1.0	10.9
2016–17	Osaka	39	5	12.6	42.8	29.2	45.9	2.9	0.9	0.7	0.5	8.0
2016–17	Marinos	6	0	17.5	53.1	**44.4**	72.7	1.67	1.17	0.17	0.17	7.67
2017–18	Soles	17	7	23.9	38.1	28.6	75.9	4.79	1.50	0.93	0.43	8.29
2018–19	Shinshu	16	16	35.17	43.5	14.1	56.3	9.7	4.0	3.25	1.44	19.1

=== Playoffs ===
Year	Team	GP	GS	MPG	FG%	3P%	FT%	RPG	APG	SPG	BPG	PPG
2008-09	Bnei	4		18.3	.448	.250	.300	2.3	0.3	2.0	0.3	7.8
2009-10	Haifa	4		10.0	.105	.000	.500	1.8	0.3	0.3	0.8	1.5
2010-11	RGV	8	1	25.7	.453	.200	.558	4.75	1.88	1.38	1.00	14.25
2011-12	Fos	6		23.0	.574	.571	.500	4.0	1.3	1.5	0.3	11.7
2012-13	Humacao	4		16.5	.370	.125	.500	3.8	1.5	1.0	0.8	6.5
2013-14	Akita	6		26.67	.474	.345	.636	6.5	2.17	2.17	1.67	19.0

=== International Awards & Honors ===
- Greek HEBA A1 Round 1 MVP - 2011-2012
