= Cliff Meely =

American basketball player

Personal information
- Born: July 10, 1947 Rosedale, Mississippi, U.S.
- Died: May 29, 2013 (aged 65) Boulder, Colorado, U.S.
- Listed height: 6 ft 8 in (2.03 m)
- Listed weight: 218 lb (99 kg)

Career information
- High school: Harlan (Chicago, Illinois)
- College: Northeastern CC (1967–1968); Colorado (1968–1971)
- NBA draft: 1971: 1st round, 7th overall pick
- Drafted by: San Diego Rockets
- Playing career: 1971–1981
- Position: Power forward
- Number: 25, 21

Career history
- 1971–1976: Houston Rockets
- 1976: Los Angeles Lakers
- 1977–1979: AMG Sebastiani Rieti
- 1979–1980: Mulhouse
- 1980–1981: Lazio

Career highlights
- Second-team All-American – USBWA (1971); Third-team All-American – AP (1971); 2× Big Eight Player of the Year (1969, 1971); 3× First-team All-Big Eight (1969–1971); No. 20 retired by Colorado Buffaloes

Career NBA statistics
- Points: 2,658 (8.4 ppg)
- Rebounds: 1,703 (5.4 rpg)
- Assists: 398 (1.3 apg)
- Stats at NBA.com
- Stats at Basketball Reference

Cliff Meely (July 10, 1947 – May 29, 2013) was an American basketball player who played five seasons in the National Basketball Association (NBA). He played one year at Northeastern Junior College in Sterling, Colorado, then at the University of Colorado Boulder for three years, from 1968 to 1971. He remains the Colorado Buffaloes' career leader in points per game and rebounds per game. Meely was a Big Eight all-conference performer all three years at Colorado, and was an All-American as a senior. He is one of only three Colorado basketball player to have his number retired.

He was drafted by the Houston Rockets in the 1971 NBA draft. He played for the Rockets for five years, before being traded to the Los Angeles Lakers in his last NBA season. He went on to play two years in Europe before recurring back spasms forced his retirement. His best season statistically was his rookie season, when he averaged 9.9 points and 6.6 rebounds per games. Meely died at a Boulder, Colorado hospital in 2013 of a blood infection. He was 65.

== Career statistics ==
Legend
GP	Games played	GS	Games started	MPG	Minutes per game
FG%	Field goal percentage	3P%	3-point field goal percentage	FT%	Free throw percentage
RPG	Rebounds per game	APG	Assists per game	SPG	Steals per game
BPG	Blocks per game	PPG	Points per game	**Bold**	Career high
*	Led the league

=== NBA ===
==== Regular season ====
Year	Team	GP	MPG	FG%	FT%	RPG	APG	SPG	BPG	PPG
1971–72	Houston	77	**23.6**	.406	.675	**6.6**	1.5			**9.9**
1972–73	Houston	**82***	20.7	.408	.672	6.0	1.1			7.7
1973–74	Houston	77	22.8	.427	.643	5.7	**1.6**	**.7**	**1.0**	9.7
1974–75	Houston	48	15.7	**.447**	.723	3.4	.9	.4	.4	7.9
1975–76	Houston	14	12.4	.395	.563	3.7	.7	.6	.3	5.2
1975–76	L.A. Lakers	20	7.0	.392	**.750**	2.3	.5	.3	.2	3.2
Career		318	19.9	.417	.675	5.4	1.3	.6	.7	8.4
