= List of collegiate glee clubs =

This is a list of some collegiate glee clubs located in the United States.

Name	Year established	College or university	Gender
Harvard Glee Club	1858	Harvard University	Gender neutral
University of Michigan Men's Glee Club	1859	University of Michigan	Male and non-binary
Yale Glee Club	1861	Yale University	Coed
Wesleyan University Glee Club	1862	Wesleyan University	Coed
University of Pennsylvania Glee Club	1862	University of Pennsylvania	Gender neutral
Amherst College Glee Club	1865	Amherst College	gender neutral
Cornell University Glee Club	1868	Cornell University	Male
Lehigh University Glee Club	1869	Lehigh University	Male until 2021
Dartmouth College Glee Club	1869	Dartmouth College	Male until 1970s
Union College Men's Glee Club	1869	Union College	Male
Virginia Glee Club	1871	University of Virginia	Male
Rutgers Glee Club	1872	Rutgers University	Male
Princeton Glee Club	1874	Princeton University	Coed
Ohio State University Men's Glee Club	1875	Ohio State University	Male
Singing Spartans (formerly the MSU Men's Glee Club)	1880	Michigan State University	Coed, bass voices
University of Illinois Varsity Men's Glee Club	1886	University of Illinois Urbana-Champaign	Male
Pennsylvania State University Glee Club	1888	The Pennsylvania State University	Male
Pitt Men's Glee Club	1890	University of Pittsburgh	Male
Purdue Varsity Glee Club	1893	Purdue University	Male, with one exception
Texas A&M Singing Cadets	1893	Texas A&M University	Male
Mount Holyoke Glee Club	1893	Mount Holyoke College	Gender diverse, treble voices
U of W Glee Club	1895	University of Washington	
United States Military Academy Cadet Glee Club	1903	United States Military Academy	Mixed voices
Georgia Tech Glee Club	1906	Georgia Tech	Gender neutral
Wheaton College Men's Glee Club	1907	Wheaton College	Male
Miami University Glee Club	1907	Miami University	Male
Morehouse College Glee Club	1911	Morehouse College	Male
Notre Dame Glee Club	1915	University of Notre Dame	Male
Fairfield University Glee Club	1947	Fairfield University	Coed
Villanova Singers	1953	Villanova University	Male
