= Ohio State University Men's Glee Club =

American collegiate men's chorus

The Ohio State University Men's Glee Club
- Choir
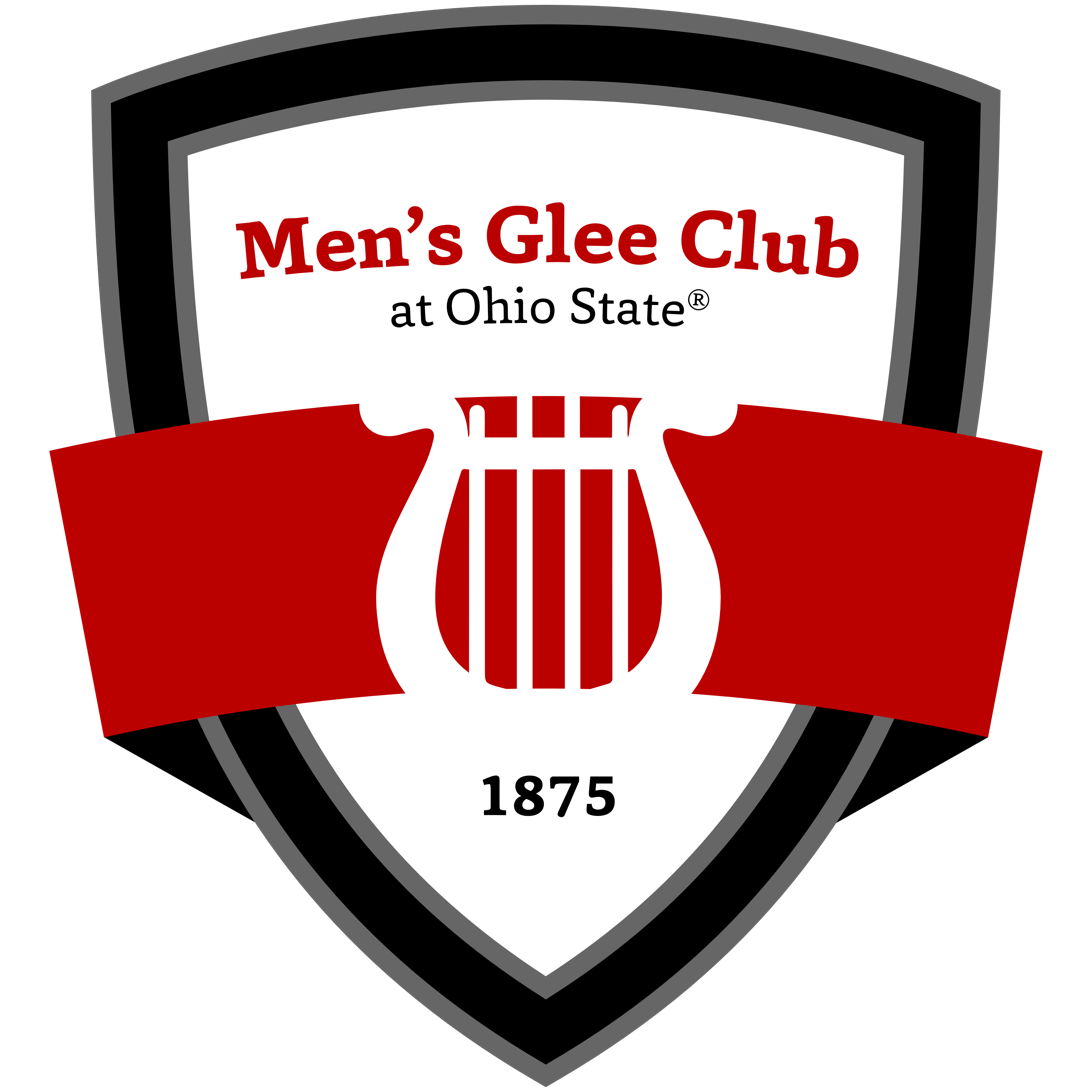
- Origin: Columbus, Ohio, United States
- Founded: 1875; 151 years ago
- Music director: Robert J. Ward
- Affiliation: Ohio State University
- Website: https://music.osu.edu/mgc

The Ohio State University Men's Glee Club is an all-male choral ensemble at Ohio State University. Officially founded in 1875, the Men's Glee Club is one of the oldest student organizations on Ohio State's campus and one of the oldest collegiate glee clubs in the United States. The group has garnered many accolades, most notably winning Choir of the World 1990 from the Llangollen International Musical Eisteddfod.

Membership consists of Ohio State students auditioned from all academic colleges within the university. Robert J. Ward is the current director, and Casey L. Cook is the current accompanist.

== The Glee Club today ==
=== Overview ===
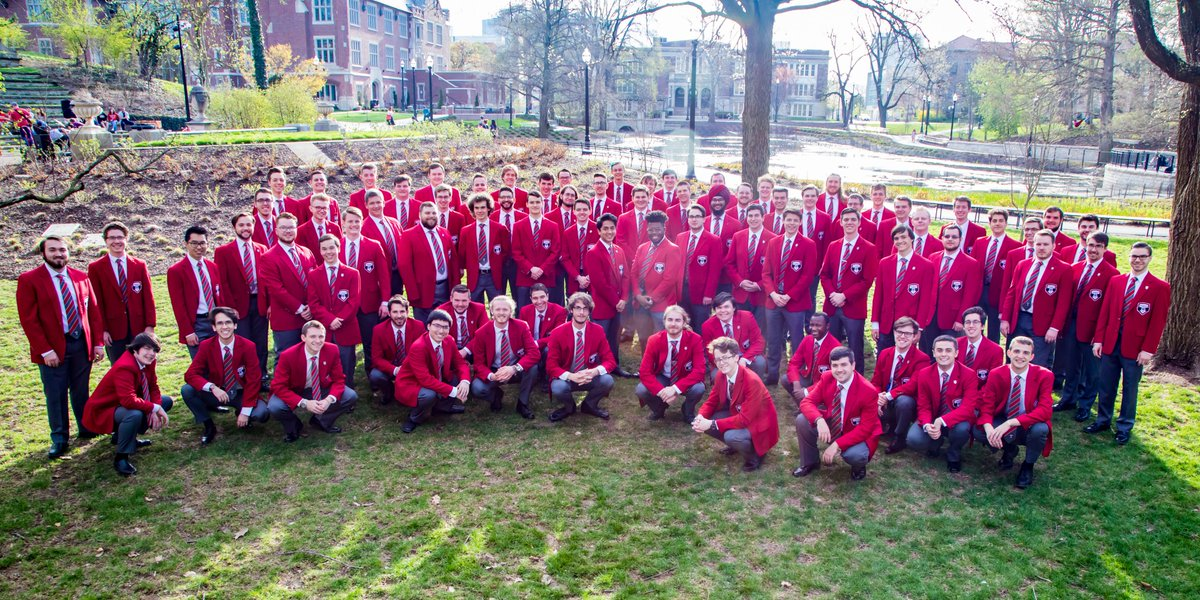
Ohio State Men's Glee Club, Spring 2019

Today, the Men's Glee Club consists of approximately 75 singers. The majority of the singers are undergraduates, but the Glee Club is open to graduate students. The Men's Glee Club describes itself as a "brotherhood that commits itself to excellence through artistry, achievement in academics, and outreach to the community."

=== The Statesmen ===
From within the Glee Club, the Statesmen are a small a cappella ensemble that are auditioned separately from the rest of the Glee Club. Their repertoire usually consists of moderate to difficult modern tunes or songs with a generally "lighter" tone compared to the more classical repertoire of the Glee Club. The Statesmen consists of 13 to 18 singers, and in addition to participating in all Glee Club rehearsals, they also hold their own rehearsals.

=== Alumni Society ===
Old Men's Glee Club Crest

The Ohio State University Men's Glee Club Alumni Society is an active choir based out of Columbus, Ohio. With membership consisting of community members who were in the Men's Glee Club during their time at Ohio State, the Alumni Society presents regular reunion concerts and sings at various events in the Columbus area, sometimes joining up with the current membership of the Men's Glee Club. The Alumni Society also maintains various endowments in order to provide scholarships to current Glee Club members.

=== Traditions ===
The Men's Glee Club has collected many traditions throughout its history. The most long-lived tradition is that of singing the Buckeye Tunes to end every performance. The Buckeye Tunes consist of four Ohio State songs that have been written at various points in Ohio State's history: "Buckeye Battle Cry", "Campus Echoes", "Carmen Ohio", and "Hang On Sloopy". In addition to being performed in concerts, the Buckeye Tunes are also used for more casual performances. These include tailgates during football season and oval sings after rehearsal on Fridays.

=== Leadership ===
==== Conductor ====
Robert J. Ward is the current conductor and musical director of the Men's Glee Club. He has held these positions since 2004. He also serves as the Director of Choral Activities at Ohio State, conducts the University Chorus, and teaches courses in conducting and choral literature.

==== Accompanist ====
Casey L. Cook is the current accompanist for the Men's Glee Club, and she has held this position since 2014. She is also the principal accompanist for the School of Music choral program. The Brothers in Song Accompanist Endowment Fund ensures that the Men's Glee Club and other Ohio State choirs have a highly qualified accompanist.

==== Student officers ====
As a student organization, the Men's Glee Club maintains a group of student officers who perform various duties and are responsible for much of the day-to-day operation of the Glee Club. The Executive Board consists of the President, the Vice President of Communications, the Vice President of Finance, the Vice President of Operations, the Vice President of Networking, and the Vice President of Alumni Relations. All Executive Board officers are elected by popular vote at the end of the one school year to serve during the next. Each Executive Board assists in charing committees to aid them in carrying out their duties.

== Current discography ==
The Men's Glee Club has recorded numerous albums in the past few decades. Some of these albums are available on music streaming services including Spotify, YouTube Music, Pandora, and Apple Music. These are all of the albums the Men's Glee Club has recorded in recent years:

Release Date	Title
2016	How Can I Keep From Singing?
2014	A Decade of Distinction
2012	Musica!
2010	Resonet
2008	Holiday Highlights
2007	We Sing
2006	Brothers In Song
2000	125th Anniversary Celebration
1997	Cum Jubilo
1996	How Firm Thy Friendship
1993	With One Voice
1990	Choir of the World

== History ==
=== Founding ===
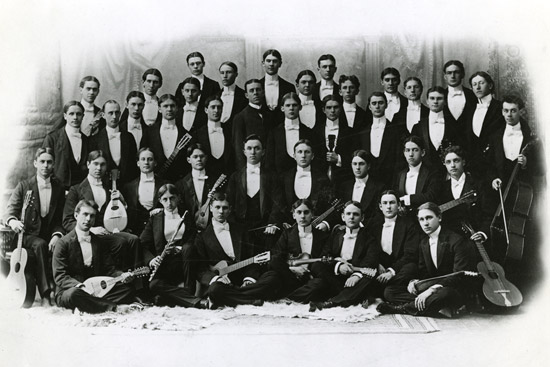
Men's Glee Club circa 1892

The informal beginnings of the Men's Glee Club date back to 1873, the first year the university was open to students. At the time, the group was little more than a social club, but by 1875, with the opening of the North Dorms, Ohio State's student newspaper, The Lantern, began making significant references to an organized chorus operating within the dorms. Since the dorms would have been occupied solely by men, it is likely that the membership of this chorus significantly overlapped with the Glee Club. Although dates listed on early recorded albums corroborate the Men's Glee Club's founding date of 1873, the official date is listed as 1875 due to the foundation of the North Dorms chorus. Thus, the Men's Glee Club is the second-oldest currently active student organization on Ohio State's campus, the oldest being the Agricultural Education Society.

Throughout the 1880s, the Glee Club failed to reorganize many times due to apathy from the student body, despite the popular sentiment that a Glee Club was one of the most important aspects of collegiate social life. However, the arrival of football on Ohio State's campus revitalized interest in the choral arts as a means of raising school spirit at sporting events. Specifically, the growing collection of school songs and yells demanded a Glee Club to sing them. By 1890, the Glee Club was reorganized and began writing and performing many school songs, including the oldest college yell still in use at Ohio State:

Wahoo! Wahoo!
Rip-zip, bazoo!
I yell, I yell for O.S.U.!
Wahoo! Wahoo!

The Glee Club quickly gained esteem and was called on to perform for the Secretary of State during the summer of 1890. Such widespread support for the Glee Club directly inspired the assembly of the first University Orchestra during the next school year. The Glee Club's support for other extracurricular endeavors continued into 1891 when Kate E. Morhart became the first woman, first freshman, and first Ohio State student to win the state oratory competition, thanks in part to a Glee Club performance that put Kate's audience into a more receptive and jovial mindset.

Continued apathy toward organized musical groups, combined with a membership that was struggling academically, promised to doom Men's Glee Club to obscurity by the end of the century. Luckily, an initiative headed by professor William Lloyd Evans, Walter Von Steck Snyder, and Charles Herbert sought to permanently re-form the Glee Club on October 13, 1895. Evans became the group's first official director, and under his leadership, the group began giving performances that were said to be "in every way particular all that could be desired…a success from start to finish" and were said to attract "the best culture of city and University".

Word of the Men's Glee Club's fame continued to spread. By the end of 1896, their musical superiority caused visiting members of the Yale Men's Glee Club to ask the men from Ohio State to postpone a concert that was scheduled for the same night as a concert from the Yale Men's Glee Club "for fear they [would] prove too much of a counter-attraction". The second official director of the Glee Club, Charles Welton Gayman, became the first truly prominent director of the club. His focus on community outreach led him to take the club on their first multi-stop tour around the state of Ohio during the 1898-1899 school year. He also introduced the (currently defunct) tradition of the Glee Club taking part in musical theater productions by having them put on a performance of Gilbert and Sullivan's H.M.S. Pinafore.

Perhaps most important, in 1900, Gayman pushed the Glee Club to compile and publish Songs of the Scarlet and Gray, the first official songbook of the Ohio State University. Although it initially proved to be commercially unsuccessful, it was nonetheless reprised in 1904 with a second edition containing additional material. The need for a school songbook can best be summed up by the book's preface:

Of the one hundred and two songs in the present edition, forty-two belong distinctly to the Ohio State University, which is an unusually large percentage of Alma Mater songs in such works, and which is noteworthy, considering the actual and the traditional status of college music at O.S.U. More than a dozen of these songs have never before been published. Several national hymns and patriotic songs have been included among the songs which every loyal college student knows and loves to sing. While this edition might be greatly improved, it is still hoped that it will fulfill the purpose for which it is designed: —the purpose of affording a means of increasing the pleasures of our college life, and perhaps, a means of enlivening and ennobling the college spirit which prevails among the hundreds who proudly affirm their allegiance to the Scarlet and Gray.

=== Carmen Ohio ===
One of the most monumental improvements to Songs of the Scarlet and Gray came in 1903. On December 11, the Men's Glee Club gave a joint concert with the Women's Glee Club, the first of its kind since the formation of the Women's Glee Club earlier that year. The performance ended with the debut of Ohio State's Alma Mater, "Carmen Ohio". The circumstances surrounding the concert were far more dubious than the eventual outcome. Continued apathy from students caused Glee Club membership to dwindle by 1901, eventually forcing them to combine with the Guitar and Mandolin Club. However, the merger, along with support from Alfred Rogerson Barrington, the first official professor of music and eventual inaugural head of the music department, eventually brought the Men's Glee Club back into a place of prominence. The collaboration with the Women's Glee Club was out of necessity since their newly formed group did not yet have enough material prepared to allow the women to put on their own full concert. In particular, the music, which was adapted from the well-known "Spanish Hymn," was carefully chosen:

Now, 20 years later, I cannot recall just where and when, with pencil and pen, at home or on the campus, the text was composed…The ease of singing the Spanish Hymn accounts for much of its use…Other music was considered and discharged, both original and adapted; all of us know the hymn;…There is a real and lasting quality about such simple harmonies that lends dignity to the phrases.

Although initially well received, the song was lost for a few years. Eventually, The Lantern re-published it before the 1906 football game against Michigan, solidifying its significance and leading to its adoption as Ohio State's official Alma Mater. In fact, the Men's Glee Club premiered two songs in the concert about their Alma Mater, though only one would make a lasting impression:

Two compositions written for this concert found place on the program, a Hymn to Ohio, used as the opening number, and Carmen Ohio, with words and music by F. A. Cornell, ’06, the closing song. This last song might well be made a part of every glee club program, as it has all the elements of a good college chorus, easily sung and easily remembered words, and a simple, catching air. We have too few songs to call our own.

=== Early to mid-1900s ===
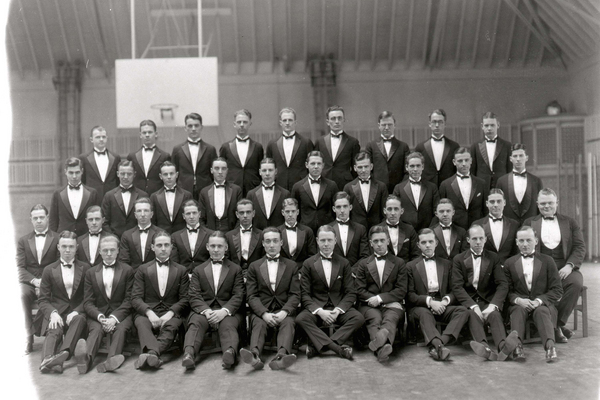
Glee Club from the 1922-1923 school year

Under the direction of A.R. Barrington, the Men's Glee Club became a regular fixture on Ohio State's campus. Their notoriety inspired both John Philip Sousa and Victor Herbert to serve as guest directors in 1910. As the Glee Club continued to contribute to the growing collection of Ohio State songs, the Ohio State University Association (currently known as the Ohio State University Alumni Association) would continue where Songs of the Scarlet and Gray left off by publishing Ohio State's second official songbook, Songs of Ohio State University, in 1916. Later given a second edition in 1923, this book included modern Ohio State fight songs such as "Across the Field" and "Buckeye Battle Cry".

World War I forced the Glee Club to temporarily disband in 1918 (as World War II would also force it to do in 1945), but the ensemble eventually reorganized by February 1919. The Glee Club's earliest known recording was made in 1926 at the Victor laboratory during a tour to Camden, New Jersey. In 1929, the Glee Club participated in their first series of choral competitions. They won Ohio’s statewide intercollegiate contest, going on the next week to participate in the National Intercollegiate Contest held in Carnegie Hall. Dartmouth won the competition, but the men from Ohio State placed third, finishing ahead of Yale, Harvard, and Princeton. The next year, they placed second, after a recount of the score left them trailing George Washington University by 0.4 points.

During the 1930s, the Men’s Glee Club often had no formal director. Instead, the group was divided into two subgroups, one for underclassmen and one for upperclassmen. The subgroups were often led by student directors, much as the Glee Club had been during its formative years in the late 1800s. When Ohio State’s department of music became the School of Music in 1945, it reorganized the Men’s Glee Club into an official School of Music choral ensemble. This meant that the group was now a credit-granting class and students who wished to join now had to register for it as they would any other class. The group also retained its registration with the Ohio Union as a student organization. This dual registration granted the Men’s Glee Club a unique position that is shared by only a few other student organizations, such as the Women’s Glee Club.

On March 24, 1957, the Men’s Glee Club made an appearance on The Ed Sullivan Show. The next year, they appeared on The Voice of Firestone. In 1965, shortly after the premier of the Ohio State University Marching Band's arrangement of "Hang On Sloopy", the Men’s Glee Club joined the Marching Band on the football field to perform a choral arrangement of "Hang On Sloopy" during a halftime show. This performance was the first of only four collaborations between the Marching Band and the Men's Glee Club; the second would not happen for more than 40 years. Other notable performances from this era include singing at the United States Capitol in 1969 and 1977, as well as singing for the Rose Bowl and National Football Foundation and Hall of Fame banquet in 1970.

=== Late 1900s to present ===
The Men's Glee Club performed under the baton of Robert Shaw in 1984, 1993, and 1994. They also performed in the Washington National Cathedral in 1988. Overseas trips to England and Wales occurred in 1990, and again in 1995, to compete in the Llangollen International Musical Eisteddfod. In 1991, the Glee Club performed on the Hour of Power television program, based out of Crystal Cathedral in Garden Grove, California. In 1994, they shared the stage with theater greats like Lauren Bacall and Tommy Tune in a television tribute to Betty Comden and Adolph Green.

Two more international tours occurred in 1999 and 2002, when the group traveled to Germany, France, Switzerland, Austria, the Czech Republic, and Italy. The Men's Glee Club often shares the stage with other local choruses as well, including the University of Michigan Men's Glee Club, the Bowling Green Men's Chorus, and the Columbus Gay Men's Chorus. When touring locally, the Glee Club makes a point to travel to middle schools, high schools, and churches within the area to promote singing and musicianship.

The Men's Glee Club has been chosen to sing at various musical conferences throughout the years. They have sung at: regional American Choral Directors Association conventions in 1986, 1988, 1990, 1994, 2010, and 2014; the national American Choral Directors Association convention in 1985 and 1999; the Music Educators National Conference in 1988 and 1994; the Ohio Music Education Association conference in 2012; the Ohio Choral Directors Association conference in 2007; and the national seminars of the Intercollegiate Male Choruses in 2006, 2010, 2012, and 2014.

Choir of the World 1990

These trips have taken them all over the United States, to locations including Eau Claire, Wisconsin; Hilton Head, South Carolina; Atlanta, Georgia; and New Brunswick, New Jersey. The Glee Club returned to Ohio Stadium to sing with the Marching Band for a halftime show in 2006, their first collaboration in over 40 years. They also sang with the Marching Band for a halftime show in 2010 commemorating the anniversary of the September 11, 2001 attacks, and another halftime show in 2013 commemorating the 150th anniversary of the Gettysburg Address.

The most distinguished of the Men's Glee Club's achievements is winning Choir of the World 1990 from the Llangollen International Musical Eisteddfod in Llangollen, Wales under the direction of Professor James Gallagher. They were the first all-male choir and the first choir from the United States to do so since modern competition began in 1987. During the competition, the Glee Club won the male chorus division by 20 points, then went on to win the overall competition through a unanimous secret ballot by nine judges from eight different countries. The Men's Glee Club also competed in the competition in 1995, placing second in the male chorus division that year.

== List of directors ==
(Note: an asterisk* by a name indicates a temporary, unofficial, interim, or guest director)

Years active	Name
1882-1883	L.C. Springer*
1890-1891	Orlando Ransom*
1891-1892	Eugene E. Davis*
1892	W.H. Lott*
1892-1893	C.R. Hamilton*
1895-1897	William Lloyd Evans
1897	George K. Dowd*
1898-1901	Charles Welton Gayman
1901	Roscoe C. Skiles*
1903	Howard Rector*
1903-1919	A.R. Barrington
1910	John Philip Sousa*
1910	Victor Herbert*
1919-1928	Karl H. Hoenig
1928-1934	Herbert Wall
1946-1977	Norman Staiger
1977-1981	J. Eugene McKinley*
1981-2002	James Gallagher
2002-2004	Bevan Keating*
2002-2004	Richard Schnipke*
2004–present	Robert J. Ward

== See also ==
- List of collegiate glee clubs
- Ohio State University
