= Glee club =

Musical group or choir group

The Miami University Glee Club in 1907

A glee club is a musical group or choir group, historically of male voices but also of female or mixed voices, which traditionally specializes in the singing of short songs by trios or quartets. In the late 19th century it was very popular in most schools and became a tradition in American high schools from then on.

Glee clubs were named after a form of English part song, called a glee, which they typically sang. The first named Glee Club held its initial meeting in the Newcastle Coffee House in London in 1787. Glee clubs were very popular in Britain from then until the mid-1850s but by then they were gradually being superseded by larger choral societies. By the mid-20th century, proper glee clubs were no longer common.

Testifying to the importance of glee clubs in 19th-century America, Henry Stone, a Union veteran of the American Civil War, recalled that "A glee club came down from Chicago, bringing with them the new song, 'We'll rally 'round the flag, boys' (Battle Cry of Freedom), and it ran through the camp like wildfire. The effect was little short of miraculous. It put as much spirit and cheer into the army as a victory."

The term remains in contemporary use, for show choirs established in North American colleges, universities, and high schools, although most American glee clubs are choruses in the standard sense, and rarely perform glees.

== Oldest United States collegiate examples ==
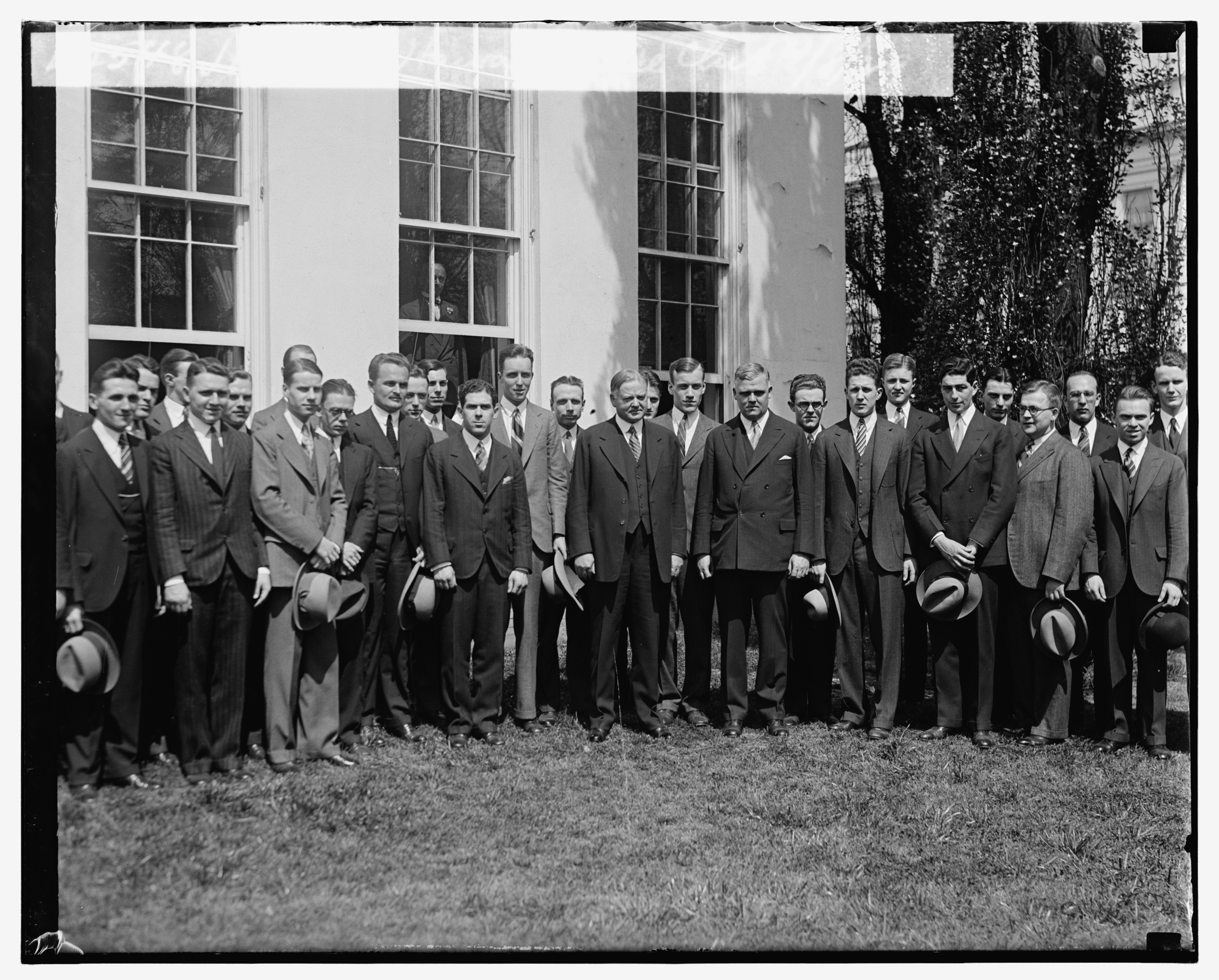
President Herbert Hoover with the Harvard Glee Club on April 8, 1929

The oldest collegiate glee clubs in the United States are, by year of foundation:

- 1858: Harvard Glee Club
- 1859: University of Michigan Men's Glee Club
- 1861: Yale Glee Club
- 1862: Wesleyan University Glee Club
- 1862: The University of Pennsylvania Glee Club
- 1865: Amherst College Glee Club
- 1868: Trinity College Glee Club
- 1868: Cornell University Glee Club
- 1869: Dartmouth College Glee Club
- 1869: Union College Men's Glee Club
- 1869: Lehigh University Glee Club
- 1871: Virginia Glee Club
- 1872: Rutgers University Glee Club
- 1873: Columbia University Glee Club
- 1874: Princeton Glee Club
- 1874: Worcester Polytechnic Institute Men's Glee Club
- 1875: The Ohio State University Men's Glee Club
- 1877: The Mount Holyoke College Glee Club
- 1886: The University of Illinois Varsity Men's Glee Club
- 1888: Penn State Glee Club
- 1890: Pitt Men's Glee Club
- 1890: The University of Kansas Men's Glee Club
- 1892: The Pomona College Men's Glee Club
- 1892: Wabash College Glee Club
- 1893: University of Michigan Women’s Glee Club
- 1893: Purdue Varsity Glee Club
- 1893: Texas A&M Singing Cadets
- 1894: The University of Oklahoma Men's Glee Club
- 1897: Case Glee Club (Case Institute of Technology and Western Reserve University)
- 1902: The Pomona College Women's Glee Club
- 1903: United States Military Academy (West Point) Cadet Glee Club
- 1906: Georgia Tech Glee Club
- 1907: Wheaton College Men's Glee Club, Miami University Glee Club
- 1911: Morehouse College Glee Club
- 1914: University of Pittsburgh Treble Choral Ensemble
- 1915: University of Notre Dame Glee Club
- 1916: Tiger Glee Club (Louisiana State University)

The oldest non-collegiate glee club in the United States is the Mendelssohn Glee Club, founded in 1866.

== See also ==
- Glee (TV series)
- List of collegiate glee clubs
