= The Ballad of Rodger Young =

1945 war song by Frank Loesser

"The Ballad of Rodger Young" is an American war song by Frank Loesser, written and first performed during World War II in March 1945. The ballad is an elegy for Army Private Rodger Wilton Young, who died after rushing a Japanese machine-gun nest on 31 July 1943, and is largely based on the citation for Young's posthumous Medal of Honor.

"The Ballad of Rodger Young"
Performed by the West Point Cadet Glee Club, 1959.

== Writing and composition ==
Loesser wrote the "Ballad of Rodger Young" while enlisted as a private in the USAAF's Radio Production Unit, a unit staffed with top Hollywood talent and equipped with a dedicated orchestra, whose task it was to produce two radio recruiting shows a day. There, Loesser was charged with editing song sheets and writing songs designed to aid in recruitment. How Loesser came to write the song is not entirely clear. There is some agreement among sources that the Army asked Loesser to write, in his daughter's words, "a 'proper' infantry song", but according to others the request came from E. J. Kahn Jr., an infantry public relations officer and friend of Loesser's.

Loesser decided to write the song about a Medal of Honor recipient, so he obtained a list of awardees and searched them for a name that would scan. After dismissing many "wonderfully unwieldy melting-pot names", Loesser found "the perfect WASP name" at the end of the list: Rodger Young. Later, when the Army mounted a publicity campaign for the song, Loesser was asked for background material. As it would not have been politic to say that he chose Rodger Young simply because the name sounded good, Loesser agreed to provide a fictitious background story about the noted harmonica player Larry Adler telling him of Young's musicianship.

== Recording history and reception ==
The "Ballad", sung by Earl Wrightson with only a guitar accompaniment, was first broadcast in early 1945 on the radio program of Meredith Willson. The song was apparently considered unlikely to become commercially popular initially, as Burl Ives recorded it only on the B side of his hit single "The Foggy, Foggy Dew". The "Ballad" does not appear on any charts and there is therefore no concrete evidence for its actual popularity. According to World War II veteran and historian Paul Fussell, the song "proved too embarrassing for either the troops or the more intelligent home folks to take to their hearts."

But several events, according to William and Nancy Young, gave the song a "much-needed boost": LIFE magazine devoted seven pages of its March 5, 1945, issue to Rodger Young and Loesser's ballad, also reproducing the sheet music, and the Army created the Combat Infantry Band specifically to play the "Ballad". The return of Rodger Young's body to the U.S. for burial in 1949 accelerated interest in the ballad again, with "best-selling" recordings of it being made by "a host of singers" before the end of the year, including Burl Ives, Nelson Eddy and John Charles Thomas.

Consequently, several writers attest to the song being well-received both during and after the war. John Bush Jones writes that this "singularly moving", "simple but affecting song" "had a powerful impact on Americans at the time". M. Paul Holsinger notes that Wrightson's recording became one of the most requested songs of the war years. And according to then Army bandsman Frank F. Mathias, it became "the best loved theme" for American infantrymen.

The ballad plays a prominent role in Robert A. Heinlein's 1959 novel Starship Troopers, in which it is associated with the ship named after Young and its crew.

== Lyrics ==
While Loesser's melody emulates folksong, a normally pacific genre, the text of the song unapologetically glorifies military valor. About this, Loesser once commented: "You give [the folks at home] hope without facts; glory without blood. You give them a legend with the rough edges neatly trimmed." Despite its overt militarism, the text has been noted for its "narrative detachment and absence of sentimentality", as well as its "poignant urgency".

The lyrics are reproduced here in the form they were first published in Life, with minor changes in capitalization and punctuation.

1. Oh, they've got no time for glory in the Infantry.
Oh, they've got no use for praises loudly sung,
But in every soldier's heart in all the Infantry
Shines the name, shines the name of Rodger Young.

Shines the name — Rodger Young,
Fought and died for the men he marched among.
To the everlasting glory of the Infantry
Lives the story of Private Rodger Young.

2. Caught in ambush lay a company of riflemen —
Just grenades against machine guns in the gloom —
Caught in ambush till this one of twenty riflemen
Volunteered, volunteered to meet his doom.

Volunteered — Rodger Young,
Fought and died for the men he marched among.
In the everlasting annals of the Infantry
Glows the last deed of Private Rodger Young.

3. It was he who drew the fire of the enemy
That a company of men might live to fight;
And before the deadly fire of the enemy
Stood the man, stood the man we hail tonight.

Stood the man — Rodger Young,
Fought and died for the men he marched among.
Like the everlasting courage of the Infantry
Was the last deed of Private Rodger Young.

4. On the island of New Georgia in the Solomons,
Stands a simple wooden cross alone to tell
That beneath the silent coral of the Solomons,
Sleeps a man, sleeps a man remembered well.

Sleeps a man — Rodger Young,
Fought and died for the men he marched among.
In the everlasting spirit of the Infantry
Breathes the spirit of Private Rodger Young.

5. No, they've got no time for glory in the Infantry,
No, they've got no use for praises loudly sung,
But in every soldier's heart in all the Infantry
Shines the name, shines the name of Rodger Young.

Shines the name — Rodger Young,
Fought and died for the men he marched among.
To the everlasting glory of the Infantry
Lives the story of Private Rodger Young.

== See also ==
- Role of music in World War II

== Bibliography ==
- Fussell, Paul (1990). Wartime: understanding and behavior in the Second World War. Oxford University Press US. p. 185. ISBN 978-0-19-506577-0.
- Holsinger, M. Paul (1999). War and American popular culture: a historical encyclopedia, Volume 1998. Greenwood Publishing Group. p. 233. ISBN 978-0-313-29908-7.
- Jones, John Bush (2003). Our musicals, ourselves: a social history of the American musical theater. UPNE. p. 127. ISBN 978-0-87451-904-4.
- Jones, John Bush (2006). The songs that fought the war: popular music and the home front, 1939-1945. UPNE. pp. 157–159. ISBN 978-1-58465-443-8.
- Loesser, Susan (2000). A most remarkable fella: Frank Loesser and the guys and dolls in his life: a portrait by his daughter. Hal Leonard Corporation. p. 51. ISBN 978-0-634-00927-3.
- Marmorstein, Gary (1997). Hollywood Rhapsody: Movie Music and its Makers, 1900 to 1975. Schirmer Books. p. 181. ISBN 978-0-02-864595-7.
- Mathias, Frank F. (2000). GI Jive: An Army Bandsman in World War II. University Press of Kentucky. p. 87. ISBN 978-0-8131-9009-9.
- Riis, Thomas Laurence (2008). Frank Loesser. Yale University Press. p. 7. ISBN 978-0-300-11051-7.
- Young, William H.; Young, Nancy K. (2008). American history through music: Music of the World War II era. Greenwood Publishing Group. p. 22. ISBN 978-0-313-33891-5.
