= Notre Dame Victory March =

Collegiate fight song

The Notre Dame Victory March is the fight song for the University of Notre Dame.

Notre Dame Victory March
The Band of the Fighting Irish performs the Notre Dame Victory March

The chorus of the song has been considered one of the most recognizable collegiate fight songs. It was ranked first among fight songs by Northern Illinois University professor William Studwell. Since its inception it has become widely borrowed and used by many schools and programs. It also placed fifth-best in a Sports Illustrated fight song ranking.

== Origin ==
The Notre Dame Victory March was originally created by Michael J. Shea and his brother John F. Shea. Michael wrote the music while John served as the original lyricist. Both of the Shea brothers were alumni at Notre Dame, with Michael graduating in 1905 and John earning degrees there in 1906 and 1908. Michael was an organist at St. Patrick's Cathedral in New York. At the behest of his former music teacher, Professor William C. Hammond of Mount Holyoke College, Michael Shea would first perform the song publicly on the organ of the Second Congregational Church of Holyoke, Massachusetts, where Hammond was music director, soon after completing the composition with his brother in the winter of 1908.

== Lyrics ==
The wording of the song is as follows.

Rally sons of Notre Dame,
Sing her glory and sound her fame,
Raise her Gold and Blue,
And cheer with voices true,
Rah! Rah! For Notre Dame.
We will fight in every game
Strong of heart and true to her name.
We will ne’er forget her
And we’ll cheer her ever,
Loyal to Notre Dame

Cheer, Cheer for Old Notre Dame
Wake up the echoes cheering her name,
Send a volley cheer on high,
Shake down the thunder from the sky.
What though the odds be great or small
Old Notre Dame will win over all,
While her loyal sons are marching
Onward to Victory!

== History ==
Many books and other sources have erroneously reported that the song was first performed on Notre Dame's campus on Easter Sunday, 1909, in the rotunda of the Main Building. However, the song made its debut on the Notre Dame campus on December 1, 1908, in Washington Hall at an event honoring the university president, the South Bend Tribune reported on the front page in the next day's issue. "New Notre Dame Song Making Hit, Shea Production Sung First Time at President's Exercises," the newspaper headline announced. The tune was sung by the Notre Dame Glee Club, accompanied by the university orchestra. "The song made a decided hit in the hall and at dinner, where it was also given," the Tribune reported.

== Revisions ==
The lyrics were revised in the 1920s; Notre Dame Victory March first appeared under the copyright of the University of Notre Dame in 1928.

Joseph Casasanta, the University of Notre Dame's Director of Bands from 1923 to 1942, wrote an arrangement of the Victory March which became "the basis for what the Marching Band and Glee Club still perform today." The original composers, John and Michael Shea, believed their composition to be "amateurish" and hoped it would be improved upon. Michael Shea praised Casasanta's arrangement, remarking that "the coming of Mr. Casasanta was evidently the realization of our hopes, and to him I express my hearty appreciation of a good work admirably done for the best University in the land."

The lyrics to the Victory March were modified in June 2022 to mark Notre Dame's 50th anniversary of undergraduate coeducation. The second verse had "daughters" added in recognition of the university's female students:

Original ending lines

When her loyal sons are marching
Onward to victory

Revised ending lines

While her loyal sons and daughters
March on to victory

== Variations ==
Several other teams have used parts of this song as their fight song. For example: The Sydney Swans use the chorus for their fight song.

Cheer, cheer the red and the white,
Honour the name by day and by night,
Lift that noble banner high,
Shake down the thunder from the sky
Whether the odds be great or small*,
Swans will go in and win over all
While our loyal Swans are marching
Onwards to victory!

Another variation is the team song of the Australia women's national cricket team.
