= Joyce Johnson =

Joyce Johnson may refer to:

- Joyce Johnson (author) (born 1935), American author of fiction and nonfiction
- Joyce Johnson (organist) (born 1932), professor of music at Spelman College
