= Willis Laurence James =

American musician, composer and educator

Willis Laurence James (September 18, 1900 – December 27, 1966) was an American musician, composer and educator. He was on the faculty of Spelman College for more than three decades.

== Biography ==
Willis James was born in Montgomery, Alabama, United States, and was raised in Pensacola and Jacksonville, Florida. Educated at the Florida Baptist Academy in Jacksonville, he studied violin with Sidney Woodward. Woodward recognized his musical talent and took James for further study to Atlanta, Georgia, where from the age of 16 he was the protégé of Kemper Harreld, a concert violinist and head of the Morehouse College music department. James enrolled at Morehouse in 1919, and his studies included the traditional core of music courses, as well as the violin and several other instruments. He was a member of the Morehouse Quartet and Glee Club, and played violin in the college orchestra. James showed great promise as a concert violinist and performed as a recitalist and soloist throughout his career.

After receiving his B.A. from Morehouse in 1923, James pursued further study with Oswald Blake and Edwin Gerschefski at the Chicago Musical College.

James began his teaching career at Leland College in Baker, Louisiana (1923–29), and it was while living in Louisiana that he began collecting folklore and folksongs, particularly along the levees of the Mississippi River. In 1927 the Paramount Record Company of Chicago released a record on which he sang folksongs and for which he and James Edward Halligan transcribed the music and texts. In 1928 James married a fellow teacher at Leland College, Theodora Joanna Fisher.

From 1929 to 1933, he taught at the Alabama State Teachers College at Montgomery, before accepting a teaching position at Spelman College, where he would stay for the remainder of his career, serving as chairman of the music department and director of the Spelman College Glee Club. After the retirement of Kemper Harreld, he assumed the duties of director of music at both Morehouse and Spelman Colleges, and secured Joyce Johnson as Spelman College organist.

With Horace Mann Bond, president of Fort Valley State College, James co-founded the Fort Valley State College Folk Festival (1940–55), and was a member of the summer faculty there from 1941 to 1949.

James continued investigating folksongs over the years and was noted for his compositions and arrangements. His theory that "the cry" was the most distinctive feature of black folksong attracted some attention. He lectured at college campuses, before professional societies, at the Newport Jazz and Folk Festivals, and at the Roundtables of the Tanglewood music festival. He received awards from the General Education Board and the Carnegie Foundation and in 1955 received an honorary doctorate from Wilberforce University. In April 1966, he lectured at the opening of the Center for the Arts in Lagos, Nigeria.

At the time of his death on December 27, 1966, he left a completed manuscript, Stars in De Elements, which was published in 1995 as a special issue of the journal Black Sacred Music.
