= Irene Higginbotham =

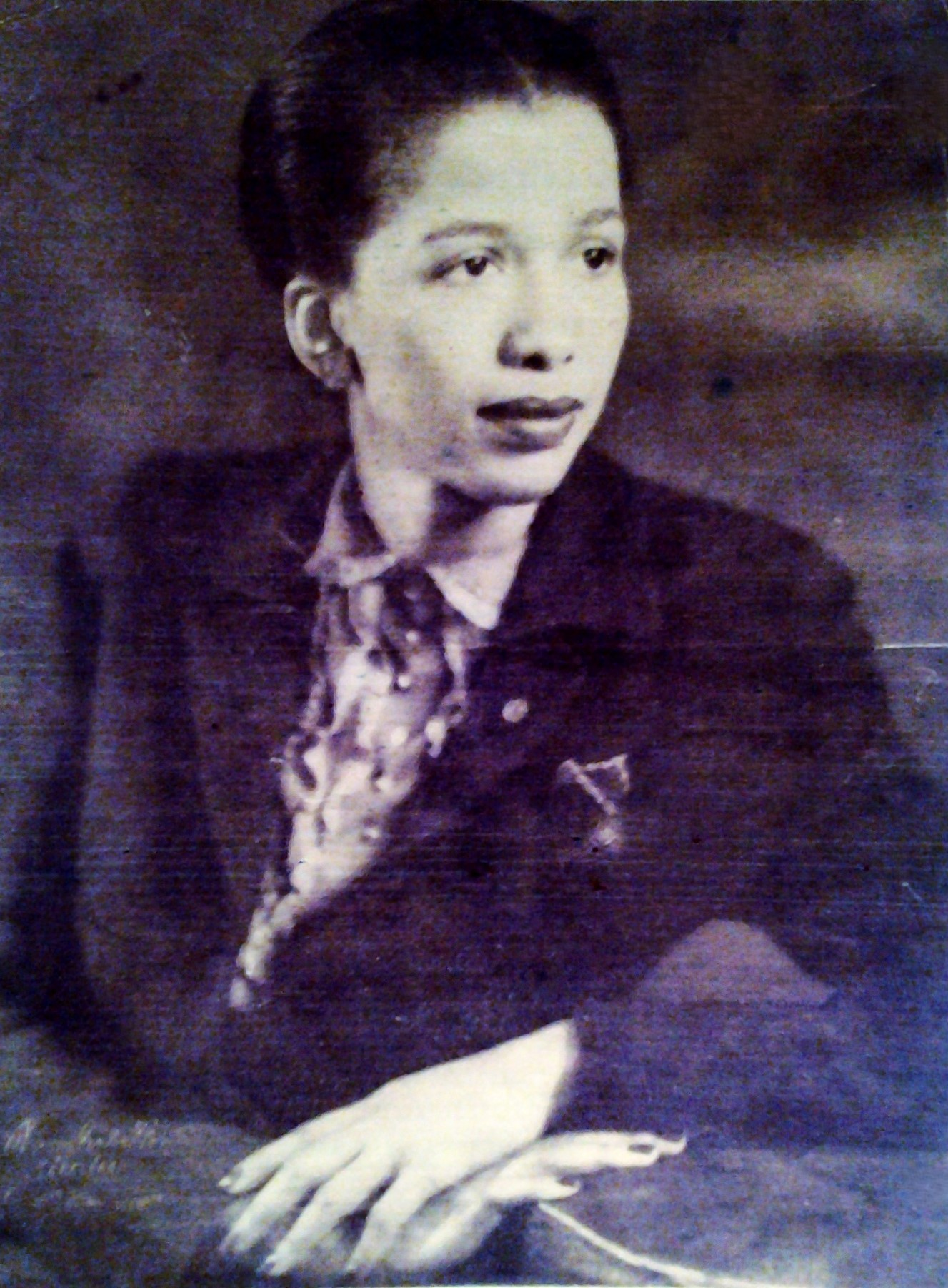

Background information
- Born: June 11, 1918; Worcester, Massachusetts, United States
- Died: August 27, 1988 (aged 70) New York City
- Genres: Blues, jazz
- Occupations: Songwriter, musician
- Instrument: Piano
- Years active: 1930s–1988

Irene Higginbotham (June 11, 1918 – August 27, 1988) was an American songwriter and concert pianist. She is best known for co-writing the Billie Holiday song "Good Morning Heartache" (1946).

== Early life ==
Higginbotham was born on June 11, 1918, in Worcester, Massachusetts. Irene was born and raised in a family who loved music. She started her career by publishing her first song at the age of 13, and her songwriting career spanned from 1938-1977. Her work included jazz, country, doo- woop, and pop tunes. While her closest connection in the popular music of the 1930s and 1940s was Billie Holiday, the prolific songwriter was niece of the classic African-American jazz trombonist J. C. Higginbotham. She was a music student of choral conductor Kemper Harreld, of Morehouse College fame, and Frederic Hall. Irene Higginbotham moved to Atlanta before settling down in New York in her early 20s. In NY, she was both a gifted pianist and music composer who began publishing songs.

Higginbotham gained her education as both a stenographer and a music student from the New York Business School and learned under musical teacher’s Kemper Harold and Frederic Hall. Not only a music composer, Irene also created chamber music and a large variety of orchestral works. Most of these under the alias of Hart Jones, just one of many names that Irene used instead of her own.

Irene’s mother, Hart Jones Higginbotham, died just over a year after Irene was born. And her father, Garnett Roy Higginbotham raised her in Atlanta, Georgia. Garnett Roy Higginbotham was a hard working man, and had jobs as a tailor, educator, and journalist, all while raising Irene and teaching her piano. She began to compose music in her teens while studying music under Kemper Harreld and Frederick Hall. Eventually moving to New York to become a songwriter.

== Career ==
She was also a concert pianist at the age of 15 and joined the American Society of Composers, Authors and Publishers (ASCAP) in 1944 when she was about 26. She was a composer of nearly 50 published songs. However, because she was an African-American woman who worked as a composer on Tin Pan Alley during a period when composers there were overwhelmingly white and male, some scholars and musicologists have speculated that Higginbotham may have composed many more songs that were never published and/or where she was never given a credit as a composer or co-composer. It is known that she, like a few other composers, used a pseudonym, in her case "Glenn Gibson", in what was probably an effort to conceal the fact that she was female, and an African-American female at that. While Higginbotham remains one of the least well-known or heralded songwriters, her large contributions to jazz and popular song are undeniable. Higginbotham worked with many notable big bands, including but not limited to Benny Goodman, Stan Kenton, and Duke Ellington. Many songs that included her would be lost to history.

Irene’s most well-known song, “Good Morning Heartache” from 1946, included Higginbotham as the creator of the song’s haunting and complex melody. This song gave Irene the chance to work with Billie Holiday, who continued to record other songs created by Higginbotham. “Good Morning Heartache” is considered a standard in the jazz repertoire and routinely played to this day.

Higginbotham also composed and published songs under false names and aliases, most notably “Glenn Gibson” in order to receive more attention as an innocuous male name. She most likely did this, as other biographers note, in order to publish for organizations without push back.

During the 1950s, Irene became more and more connected to rhythm, blues, and the early rock and roll scene. Using her large range of emotion with her compositions, she moved to creating jazz, boogie woogie, jump blues, and R&B. However not all the songs that Irene created were under this name. One of Higginbotham’s publishers also used the name Glenn Gibson to copyright songs, even some that were public domain.

Irene worked in a variety of roles throughout her career and was not solely a composer. She had a hand in creating an early boogie woogie instruction book and worked under manager and promoter Joe Davis.

Irene included a large range of emotion within her material, going from lost love with more melancholy tones, to humorous material that included on-stage antics and music for a vaudeville team “Stump and Stumpy”. She also included combinations of different genres, including jazz and soap opera. She also worked with Syd Shaw, which ended with a creation of songs that were on par to R&B and doo wop. She also worked on composing pop tunes. Having such a large variety of song genres that Irene could create was one of the key factors to her success and having such a large discography. This gave her the ability to work with a diverse cast of musicians.

Higginbotham died on August 27, 1988, in New York City.

== Connections ==
Higginbotham had many connections with other prominent jazz musicians or ties to other famous figures. As she worked with or has been recognized by:

- Kemper Harreld, as one of Higginbotham’s earliest teachers.
- Andy Razaf, who composed songs with Higginbotham that were never recorded and released to the public. They also created two musicals together, “Brown Skin Models of 1944” and “Born to Swing”.
- Frederick Douglass Hall, also one of Higginbotham’s earliest teachers.
- Jean Hutson Blackwell, worked on two songs “Tuscaloosa” and “Throw Your Worries to the Devil”.
- Milt Gabler, an American record producer and founder of the Commodore Record label named Higginbotham as one of his favorite songwriters.
- Nat “King” Cole, his trio recorded both “This Will Make You Laugh” and “I’ve Got to Change My Ways” in 1947.
- Sammy Price, who’s music Higginbotham adapted to and made her own version of.
- J.C. Higginbotham, J.C. was Irene’s uncle who had a large influence on her life. He helped her create connections to musicians within NY and he wrote music with her.
- Bud Powell, included “Good Morning Heartache” in his film “Beware” included Louis Jordan.
- Louis Jordan, starred in “Beware” and also recorded Irene’s tune, “No Sale”.
- Louis Armstrong, who wrote two songs with Irene, “Ol’ Man Jeep” and “My Heart is At Your Command”.

J.C. Higginbotham introduced one of her compositions to the Red Allen Band. The ensemble subsequently recorded the piece during their next session. This recording contributed to the early development of her professional career.

== Works ==
Her popular-song compositions included:

- "Good Morning Heartache" (1946), recorded by Billie Holiday, Joe Williams, Billy Eckstine, Ella Fitzgerald, Tony Bennett and many others
- "No Good Man", recorded by Billie Holiday (1946), and Nina Simone (1961)
- "This Will Make You Laugh", recorded by Nat King Cole Trio in 1941 and in 1993 by daughter Natalie Cole, also Carmen McRae (1955), Marvin Gaye (1978), John Pizzarelli (1992), and Keith Ingham (1998)
- "Are You Livin' Old Man", recorded by Anita O'Day with the Stan Kenton Orchestra (1942), and June Christy with the Stan Kenton Orchestra (1945)
- "It's Mad, Mad, Mad", recorded by Duke Ellington (1947)
- "I Got News for You", recorded by Woody Herman (1948)
- "Mean and Evil Blues", recorded by Dinah Washington (1948)
- "No Sale", recorded by Louis Jordan & His Tympany Five (1945)
- "That Did It, Marie", recorded by Peggy Lee and Benny Goodman & His Orchestra (1941)
- "The Bottle's Empty" recorded by Coleman Hawkins (1945)

Also see ASCAP pages for a partial list.

== The two Irenes ==
Irene Higginbotham is not to be confused with Irene Kitchings (1908-1975), who was married to jazz pianist Teddy Wilson for a short time and wrote the jazz standard Some Other Spring.
