= Jerry Blackstone =

American conductor

Jerry Blackstone is a Grammy Award winning American choral conductor. He was the director of choirs and chair of the Conducting Department at the University of Michigan and the music director of the University Musical Society Choral Union.

Blackstone holds degrees from Wheaton College, Indiana University, and the University of Southern California and has served on the music faculties of Phillips University, Westmont College, and Huntington University. In 1988, Blackstone joined the faculty of the University of Michigan, where he conducted the University of Michigan Chamber Choir, taught conducting at the graduate level, administered a choral program of eleven choirs, and directed the University of Michigan’s Summer Music Programs and Michigan Youth Ensembles. In 2022 he became the director of the Wheaton College Men's Glee Club and Women's Chorale choirs.

From 1988 to 2002, Blackstone was the conductor of the University of Michigan Men's Glee Club. He led the group on tours of Australia, Eastern and Central Europe, Asia, South America, and the United States. The Men’s Glee Club CD, I Have Had Singing, is a retrospective of his tenure as conductor of the ensemble.

Blackstone has appeared as festival guest conductor and workshop presenter in twenty-eight states as well as Hong Kong, Shanghai and Australia. His publications include an educational video, Working with Male Voices, and the Jerry Blackstone Choral Series.

In April 2004, Blackstone became Conductor and Music Director of the University Musical Society Choral Union, a large community/university chorus that frequently appears with the Detroit Symphony Orchestra performing major choral-orchestral works. In 2003/2004, he prepared the choirs for the Grammy-winning recording of William Bolcom's Songs of Innocence and of Experience.
