= Mansions of the Lord =

2002 hymn written by Randall Wallace

"Mansions of the Lord" is a hymn written by Randall Wallace and set to the music of Nick Glennie-Smith. There is a German version called "Die Villen des Herrn".

In June 2026, CBS News included the hymn in its list of the 250 essential American songs of the past 250 years.

== Performances ==
"Mansions" was originally written for the 2002 film We Were Soldiers, and was performed by the United States Military Academy Cadet Glee Club and the Metro Voices.

The hymn also served as the recessional in the 2004 funeral of President Ronald Reagan. That rendition was sung by the Armed Forces Chorus with the United States Marine Chamber Orchestra.

The hymn is featured on the CD of the same name by the Morriston Orpheus Choir from Wales.

== Lyrics ==
To fallen soldiers let us sing
Where no rockets fly nor bullets wing
Our broken brothers let us bring
To the Mansions of the Lord

No more bleeding, no more fight
No prayers pleading through the night
Just divine embrace, Eternal light
In the Mansions of the Lord

Where no mothers cry and no children weep
We will stand and guard though the angels sleep
All through the ages safely keep
The Mansions of the Lord

== German lyrics ==
Lass uns zu gefallenen Soldaten singen
Wo keine Raketen fliegen und keine Kugeln fliegen
Unsere gebrochenen Brüder lassen uns bringen
Zu den Villen des Herrn

Keine Blutung mehr, kein Kampf mehr
Keine flehentlichen Gebete durch die Nacht
Nur göttliche Umarmung, ewiges Licht
In den Villen des Herrn

Wo keine Mütter weinen und keine Kinder weinen
Wir werden stehen und bewachen, obwohl die Engel schlafen
Alle durch die Jahrhunderte sicher aufbewahren
Die Villen des Herrn
