= Rodger Young Village =

Veteran housing project in Los Angeles, 1946

Coordinates: 34.1536°N 118.2825°W

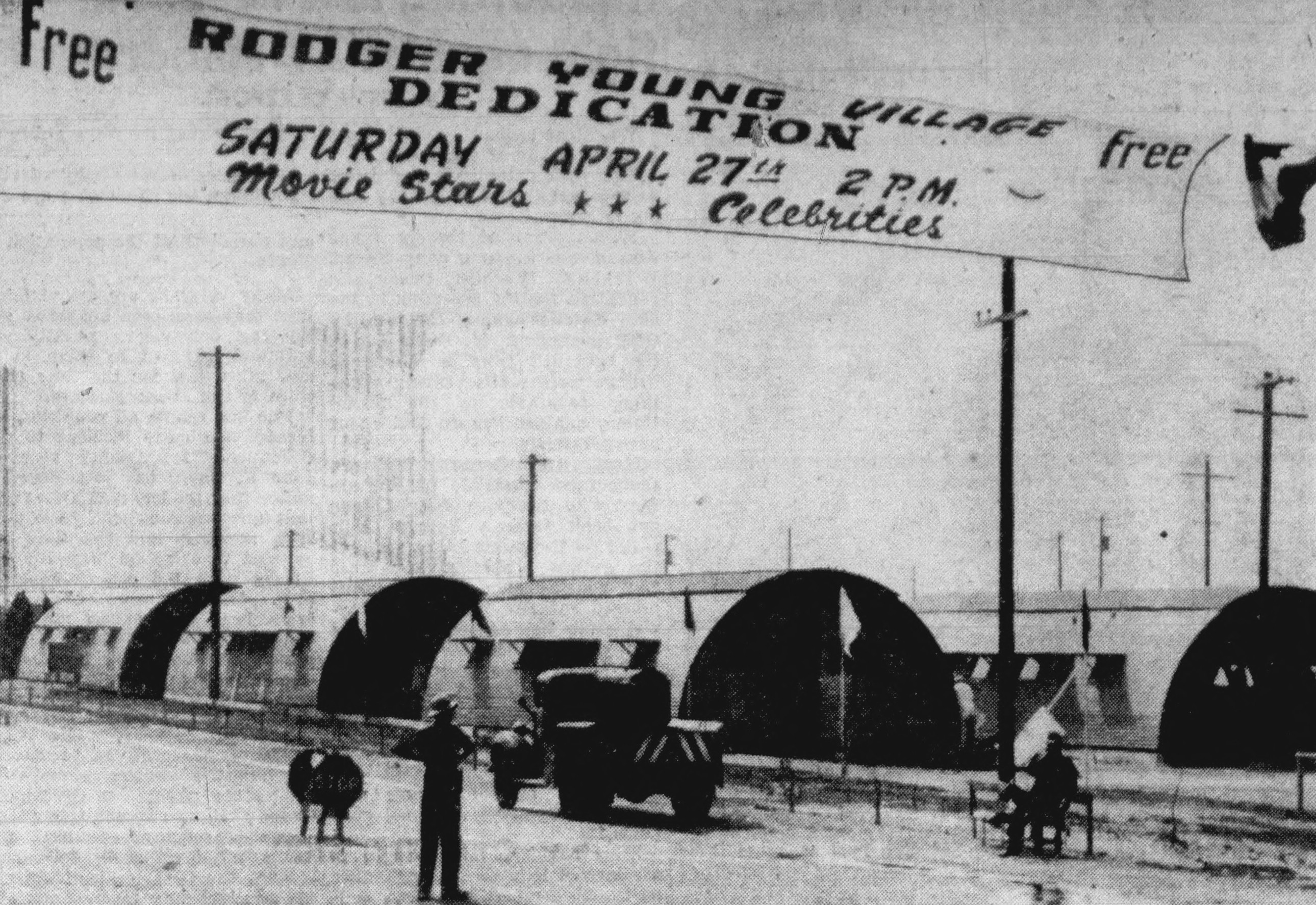
A banner across the street during the dedication of Rodger Young Village.

Rodger Young Village was a Housing Authority of the City of Los Angeles public housing project, established to provide temporary housing for veterans returning to the Southern California area following the end of World War II. The village was named for Rodger Wilton Young, an American infantryman in the U.S. Army during World War II. He was killed on the island of New Georgia while helping his platoon withdraw under enemy fire. For his actions, he posthumously received the United States' highest military decoration, the Medal of Honor.

== History ==
Built on the site of Griffith Park Aerodrome, in Griffith Park, Los Angeles, the Village consisted of 750 Quonset huts, temporary buildings made of corrugated steel, which were intended to house 1,500 families. At peak residence, over 5,000 persons lived there.

Built in approximately two months (and over the objections of the Griffith family, who had donated the park to the city), the Village was dedicated on 27 April 1946 and closed in the mid-1950s. The Quonset camp met a desperate need for living space. Thousands of Californians had left the area for military duty. When these men and women returned from the war, they found that housing had been taken by the thousands who had come to work in plants producing war material.

As the veterans were discharged from the service, they found themselves with no place to live. Rodger Young Village, named for Private Rodger Wilton Young, was one of several such projects under the control of the Los Angeles City Housing Authority. Veterans and their families were able to rent living space at reasonable rates, while waiting for the post-war housing "boom" to counter the post-war housing "crunch". Other veterans' housing projects used military barracks and trailers, as did a settlement in Burbank which provided travel trailers to house some of the Japanese and Japanese Americans who had been taken from their Southern California homes and sent to internment camps in other parts of the country.

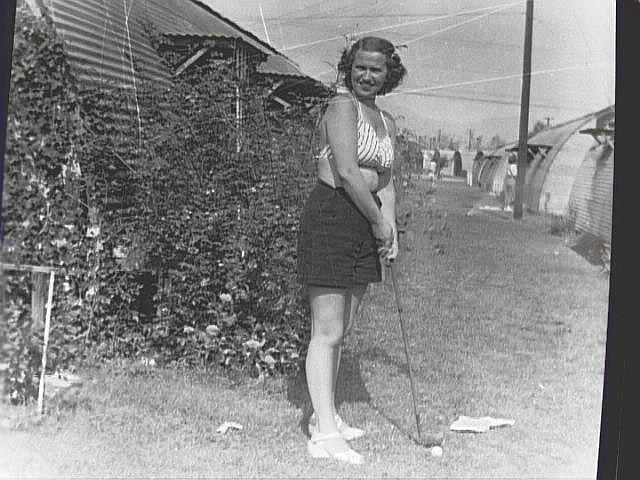
Life at the Village 1948

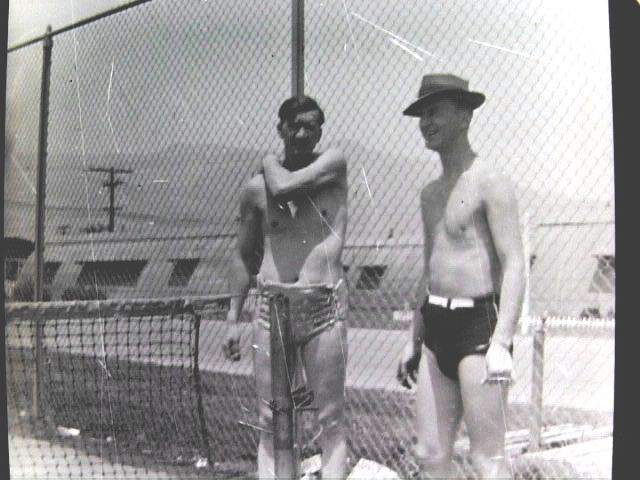
Life in the Village 1948

== Living conditions ==
Nearly all residents were young families with children (including many war brides). Each family had one half of a Quonset hut, built on concrete slab floors. Their living space consisted of two bedrooms, a bath, kitchen with icebox (not a refrigerator), and den. The few unmarried residents, and some married couples without children, had a bedroom to themselves but shared the remaining family area.

"RYV," as it was known, had a market, hardware store, milk and diaper delivery, drug store, theater and other amenities commonly found in small towns, and children enjoyed the adjacent Griffith Park and climbing the tower which still held the airport beacon. The Helms Bakery trucks and Fuller Brush salesmen made the rounds, as they did in the other neighborhoods in the area. Residents planted lawns and gardens, and were encouraged to make their surroundings as homelike as possible.

Few families had telephones, relying instead on phone booths located about 100 feet apart. When a phone call would come, whoever was closest at the moment would answer, while the neighborhood children would run to see who the call was for, then pass the word to that person.

Rodger Young Village was, for a time, the most diverse community in Southern California, as veterans of all races and all branches of the military lived there. This caused problems in some nearby restaurants, which were practicing de facto racial segregation, as next-hut neighbors went to dine together. The influence of RYV residents helped end these practices in a number of establishments.

== John Basilone Homes ==
In June 1946, two months after Rodger Young Village opened near Griffith Park, the Los Angeles City Housing Commission announced John Basilone Homes Housing Project at 10160 Glenoaks Boulevard in Pacoima, Los Angeles, California in the Sun Valley area near Hanson Dam in San Fernando Valley, and had actual housing, from Army barracks from Washington state, and rebuilt as 1,500 apartments for returning Marines, and also was demolished in 1954.

== Current site use ==
After Rodger Young Village was razed in 1954, the Aerodrome was not reopened; instead, the Griffith Park Zoo (now the Los Angeles Zoo) relocated, taking over most of the land which had been occupied by RYV. The remaining portion is now covered by John Ferraro Athletic Fields and the interchange linking Interstate Highway 5 (the Golden State Freeway) to State Route 134 (the Ventura Freeway).

No trace remains of Rodger Young Village.
