= Carmen Ohio =

School song of Ohio State University

"Carmen Ohio" (Latin for 'Song of Ohio') is the oldest school song still used by The Ohio State University. The song was composed originally as a Christian hymn in Dutch: "Vaste rots van mijn behiud als de zonde mij benauwed," and in America: "Come, Christians join and sing," both sung in Church. Later adapted by freshman athlete and Men's Glee Club member Fred Cornell in 1902 or 1903. According to some accounts, he composed it on the train ride home from Ann Arbor, Michigan after Ohio State suffered an 86-0 loss to the Michigan Wolverines. The song is set to the tune of "Spanish Hymn", or "Spanish Chant". The Men's Glee Club first performed it in 1903; however, it did not gain popularity until after its publication in The Lantern on October 10, 1906. At the following Ohio State–Michigan football game on October 20, 1906, "Carmen Ohio" was published in the program. In 1915, Cornell recalled that he wrote the song in 1903 at the request of the Men's Glee Club, and other family members later stated that the train story might be an exaggeration or outright fabrication. Currently, after every home football game in Ohio Stadium, win or lose, the football team and the crowd sing the first verse of Carmen Ohio, accompanied by The Ohio State University Marching Band. It is also sung by new graduates at the end of the university's commencement ceremonies, after diplomas are distributed.

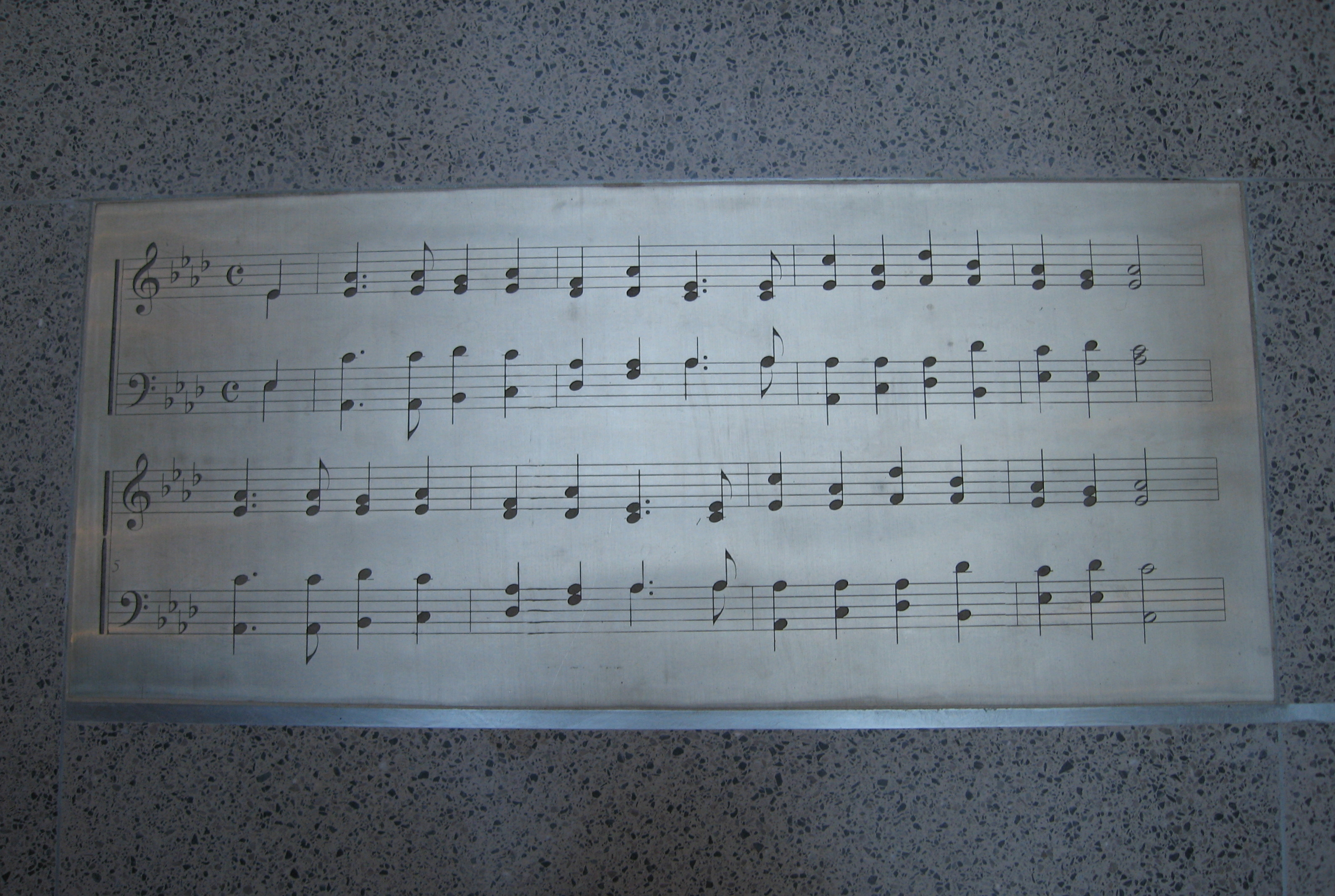
A floor tile in William Oxley Thompson Memorial Library marked with the song's musical notation.

Band director Jack Evans and arranger Richard Heine adapted the song to the brass band for which Ohio State is famous. The sound of chimes from the Orton Hall bell tower (which themselves are based on the Westminster Quarters) were added as an introduction to the song.

Small selections of the lyrics, arranged at random, are found on campus in the Ohio Union building.

The tune may also be recognized as the same in the hymn "Come Christians, Join To Sing", Text: 1843 by Christian H. Bateman (1813–1889). Music: Spanish melody; arr. by David Evans in 1927, (1874–1948), Words originally written for "Sacred Melodies for Children" published in Edinburgh, Scotland, 1843. With slight variations, the tune is used for a variety of other hymn texts, including "When This Passing World Is Done."

== See also ==
- "Bright College Years", the unofficial Yale University alma mater, from whose lyrics those of "Carmen Ohio" are largely adapted
