= Union College Men's Glee Club =

In 1869, several undergraduate men at Union College formed the College Musical Association, which represented every known musical endeavor at Union. Enduring many obstacles to its existence during its first quarter century, in 1894 the college administration elected to actively support the Musical Association, comprised at that time by the Mandolin, Banjo and Glee Clubs. The Glee Club's director at that time was Frank C. MacMahon.

== Overview ==
Moving through the turn of the century, Musical Association toured the Mohawk Valley, Hudson Valley and western New England. The Glee Club was entered into many Intercollegiate Glee Club contests and was a several-time state and regional champion. At the 1931 IMC festival at Carnegie Hall, the Union Men's Glee Club under the direction of Elmer A. Tidmarsh, attained an overall ranking that placed it within the top five in the United States.

Throughout the 1930s, the Glee Club regularly performed in NYC, including live radio broadcasts from several posh hotels including the Ritz-Carlton. It was heard regionally over WJZ (WABC (AM)) and WKBW and nationally over the NBC radio Blue Network. In 1948, the Glee Club was heard over WGY every Sunday morning.

1948 brought the Glee Club its first First Place finish in the annual Utica, New York Eisteddfod and broadened its touring schedule in the 1950s to include joint concerts with many New England and Mid-Atlantic colleges. These traditional, joint concerts continued under the stewardship of Hugh A. Wilson who became the director of the Glee Club in 1963. Prof. Wilson assumed directorship of the Union College Women's Glee Club in 1977. Both clubs performed jointly, and for the last time in May 1984. The Union College Choir was directed by Prof. Wilson until his retirement in 1998.

== See also ==
- List of Collegiate Glee Clubs
