= Jeffrey Douma =

Jeffrey Douma /ˈdaʊmə/ is the director of the Yale Glee Club and the Marshall Bartholomew Professor in the Practice of Choral Music at the Yale School of Music. He is the founding director of the Yale Choral Artists and serves as artistic director of the Yale International Choral Festival.

== Education ==
Jeffrey Douma grew up in the towns of Mankato and Marshall, Minnesota. He earned a Bachelor of Music Degree from Concordia College, Moorhead. He holds both Master of Music and Doctor of Musical Arts degrees in Conducting from the University of Michigan.

== Career ==
Prior to his appointment at Yale in 2003, he taught at Carroll University, where he was Director of Choral Activities, and also served on the conducting faculties of Smith College and St. Cloud State University.

Douma has appeared as a guest conductor around the world with such ensembles as the Royal Melbourne Philharmonic, Daejeon Philharmonic Choir, Tbilisi Symphony Orchestra, Moscow Chamber Orchestra, Buenos Aires Philharmonic, Symphony Choir of Johannesburg, and many others. He also currently serves as musical director of the Yale Alumni Chorus and was formerly choirmaster at the Cathedral of St. Joseph (Hartford, Connecticut).

Choirs under his direction have appeared in Leipzig's Neue Gewandhaus, Prague's Dvorak Hall in The Rudolfinum, the Teatro Colón in Buenos Aires, Sydney Town Hall, Christchurch Cathedral, Avery Fisher Hall, and Carnegie Hall, and he has prepared choruses for performances under such conductors as Valery Gergiev, Sir David Willcocks, Nicholas McGegan, Krzysztof Penderecki, Sir Neville Marriner, and Helmuth Rilling.

An advocate of new music, Douma established the Yale Glee Club Emerging Composers Competition as well as the Fenno Heath Award, and has premiered new works by such composers as Bright Sheng, Dominick Argento, Ned Rorem, Lee Hoiby, Joel Thompson, and James MacMillan.

Active as a clinician and guest conductor with musicians at all levels, he served four years on the conducting faculty at the Interlochen National Arts Camp. As a singer, Douma has appeared as an ensemble member and frequent tenor soloist with many of the nation's leading professional choirs, including the Dale Warland Singers, Bella Voce (group) of Chicago, the Arcadia Players, the Oregon Bach Festival Chorus under Helmuth Rilling, and the Robert Shaw Festival Singers.

== Honors and awards ==
In the spring of 2003, Douma was one of only two North American conductors invited to compete for the first Eric Ericson Award, a new international competition for choral conductors, advancing to the semifinal round in October 2003, and appearing in Uppsala and Stockholm as a conductor with four of Sweden's leading choirs.
