= Rutgers University Glee Club =

Rutgers University Glee Club (RUGC) is a nationally recognized men's chorus based at Rutgers University, in New Brunswick, New Jersey. It is currently conducted by Dr. Brandon Williams. Dr. Patrick Gardner, the previous conductor, directed the group from 1994 - 2023.

The Rutgers University Glee Club, based as it is equidistant to Philadelphia and New York City, has a long history of participating in the musical life of both those cities. The group tours frequently, both domestically and internationally; has been featured on a number of commercial recordings; and has commissioned notable works for men's chorus.

== History ==
=== Early years ===
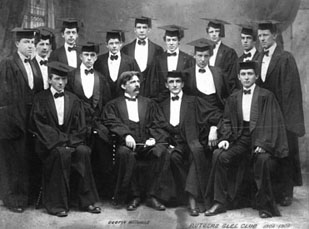
The 1902–03 Glee Club

The Rutgers University Glee Club traces its roots back to 1872, making it among the oldest glee clubs in the country. Strongly attached to the history of Rutgers University, the Glee Club's early repertoire was dominated by songs of school spirit and the emerging collegiate sport of football, which by tradition began in New Jersey at a game between Rutgers and Princeton University.

After the tenure of director Howard McKinney, for whom the Glee Club's rehearsal hall is named, F. Austin "Soup" Walter became director in 1933 and began to shape the group into a more serious musical ensemble. In addition to numerous appearances on campus and abroad, the Glee Club combined with the women of the Voorhees Choir to form and perform as "Rutgers University Choir". This mixed choir went on to perform major works with many of the era's most significant orchestral ensembles.

=== The second century ===
After the retirement of "Soup" Walter in 1983, the group went through a number of directors quickly before Patrick Gardner was appointed in 1993. Under his leadership, the Glee Club celebrated its 125th anniversary in 1997 with a performance, in combination with the Rutgers University Orchestra, of Maurice Duruflé's Messe Cum Jubilo before a nearly sold out audience at Lincoln Center's Alice Tully Hall. In 1997, the Rutgers Glee Club released their first self-produced compact disc, Let Thy Good Spirit. This recording encompasses the club's repertory from its 1996 tour of Russia and the Baltic States. 1998 saw the club record and release its second recording, The Bells Must Ring! which features songs of the university along with several mainstays of the club's repertoire.

The Glee Club completed a successful tour of Eastern Europe in the summer of 1999 with concerts in such venues as the St. Martin's Dome in Bratislava, Slovakia and the Karlskirche in Vienna, Austria. In 2000 the Glee Club hosted the National Seminar of the Intercollegiate Men's Choruses.

In 2002, the Glee Club once again toured Europe with concert events in the Netherlands, Germany, and France. Performances were held at a number of famous venues, culminating with a performance during the eve of Pentecost mass at the Cathédral de Notre Dame de Paris at the invitation of the Cathedral's staff. There have also been recent concerts combined with or hosted by the University of Michigan Men's Glee Club and the Harvard Glee Club. In the summer of 2007, the group embarked on a tour that included a performance at the invitation of the Thomaskirche in Leipzig. In 2011, the RUGC did a two-week, eleven-concert tour of Italy, which included performances at St. Peter's Basilica, St. Mark's Basilica, and the Basilica di Sant'Agostino.

In the summer of 2015, RUGC went on a two-week tour of England, Wales, and the Netherlands, totaling nine concerts. This tour included performances at venues such as Gloucester Cathedral. The tour was followed by a new RUGC album, Sudden Light, and a DVD of RUGC's performance at the University of Utrecht in the Netherlands, where the charter for Rutgers University (then Queens College) was signed in 1766. Rutgers also received inspiration for its crest and motto from the University of Utrecht.

== Musical tradition ==
While the Glee Club still performs traditional Rutgers Songs at football games (and directed the publication of a book thereof), the group is also focused on concert performance. Under the leadership of "Soup" Walter, the Glee Club performed regularly with the New York Philharmonic and the Philadelphia Orchestra under the batons of such notable directors as Erich Leinsdorf, Leonard Bernstein and Eugene Ormandy. Recordings from that era include the Glee Club as the men's section in Carl Orff's Carmina Burana (still available on compact disc on Sony's Essential Classics series), and the Grammy-nominated performance of Sir William Walton's Belshazzar's Feast, both conducted by Eugene Ormandy with the Philadelphia Orchestra.

More recently, Dr. Patrick Gardner has prepared the Glee Club for a number of high-profile performances, including performances of Arnold Schoenberg's Gurrelieder under the baton of Simon Rattle and the Babi Yar Symphony of Shostakovich conducted by Valery Gergiev.

The group has four times performed for conventions of the American Choral Directors Association, in 2001 in San Antonio, in 2005 in New York City, of which included the premiere of a piece by Jennifer Higdon, 2010 in Philadelphia, and in 2017 in Minneapolis. At the 2000 convention of the Intercollegiate Men's Choruses that the group hosted, the highlight was the premiere of The Miracle, written for chamber orchestra and men's chorus, commissioned by the club from Pulitzer Prize winning composer William Bolcom. The group has most recently performed at the 2010 IMC conference at the University of Miami Ohio, where they performed Elliot Carter's Tarantella and Steven Sametz's Dulcis Amor.

== Directors ==
- Loren Bragdon: 1881 - 1896
- Howard D. McKinney: 1916 - 1946
- F. Austin "Soup" Walter, '32: 1946 - 1983
- Frederic Hugh Ford: 1983 - 1986
- Timothy L. McDonald, '77: 1986 - 1987
- Robert Kapilow: 1987 - 1988
- Stephen E. Barton: 1988 - 1991
- Bruce Kolb: 1991 - 1993
- Patrick Gardner: 1993–2023
- Brandon Williams: 2023–present

== Digital Recordings ==
The Rutgers University Glee Club has been featured alongside the Rutgers Kirkpatrick Choir, with their sound being immortalized in compilations released digitally such as Trittico in 2011 and Legends and Legacies in 2025. Legends and Legacies is a compilation published by Patrick Gardner, the former director of the Rutgers University Glee Club, that features numerous performances by the Rutgers Kirkpatrick Choir and the Rutgers University Glee Club.

== See also ==
- Rutgers University
- Rutgers University student organizations
- List of collegiate glee clubs
