= Josephine Harreld Love =

American pianist, arts administrator and musicologist (1914–2003)

- Born: December 14, 1914; Atlanta, Georgia, U.S.
- Died: September 12, 2003 (aged 88); Detroit, Illinois, U.S.
- Education: Spelman College, BA; New York's Institute of Musical Art, BM; Radcliffe College, Master's
- Organization: Your Heritage House
- Known for: Concert pianist, musicologist, and educator
- Father: Kemper Harreld

Josephine Harreld Love (December 11, 1914 – September 12, 2003) was an American musicologist and concert pianist. She founded the children's museum Your Heritage House.

== Biography ==
Josephine Harreld was born on December 11, 1914, in Atlanta, Georgia, to Claudia Turner Harreld (née White) and Kemper Harreld. Claudia Harreld, who was of white and Native American ancestry, was a poet. She was one of the first graduates of Spelman College, where she taught. Claudia's father, William Jefferson White, was the founder of Morehouse College. Josephine's father, Kemper Harreld was a renowned violinist who worked for both Morehouse College and Spelman College.

Kemper Harreld began teaching his daughter violin when she was three years old and later taught her piano. She went on to study piano with Hazel Harrison and composition with Walter Piston. Harreld began her career as a concert pianist when she was 12, and continued to play professionally intermittently throughout her life. She toured extensively, often at black colleges and universities.

Harreld earned her bachelor's degree in English at Spelman College. She went on to earn her Bachelor of Music in Piano from New York's Institute of Musical Art in 1934. She continued her education at the Mozarteum Academy in Salzburg, Austria, in 1935. In 1936, Harreld received her master's in Musicology from Radcliffe College.

Harreld then began her teaching career. She taught at Bennett College, Oakland University, and the University of Michigan. In 1941, she moved to Detroit, Illinois, where she ran a private studio and lectured locally. She also delivered an enrichment series for the Detroit Public Schools.

Harreld met physician William Thomas Love in 1940. They married on June 18, 1941, and had two children together.

Love's work with children was instigated by her interactions with an intelligent girl whose "genius was clouded by the experiences of poverty and deprivation". In the 1950s, Love established children's performing groups, the Merry MADS (Music, Art, and Drama Society) and the Merry Marionettes. These groups were taught puppetry, as it involves acting, writing, fine arts, and movement. In 1969, Love and textile artist Gwendolyn Harkless Hogue established a children's museum, Your Heritage House. They initially funded the project themselves and ran it from Love's home, but soon were able to expand due to grants and donations. The museum was a "laboratory center" that offered courses in the arts, performances, a library, and exhibitions. Children developed skills and learned about contemporary and historical ethnic groups. Love firmly believed that children should be able to learn from professional and highly qualified artists, and incorporated this into the Your Heritage House.

Love died on September 12, 2003, in Detroit.

== Honors and awards ==
- 1971: award in recognition from the Detroit Chapter of Jack and Jill of America
- 1975: award for Great Contributions to Black America Award, Wayne County Community College
- 1978: Children's Service Award, National Black Child Development Institute
- 1980: Virginia Kiah Honor Certificate of Service Award, National Conference of Artists
- 1982: Spirit of Detroit Award
- 1983: Creative Projects Award, Alpha Kappa Alpha
- 1984: Focus and Impact Award, Oakland University
- 1987: Arts Foundation of Michigan Patron Award
- 1988: Institution Builders Award, National Black Artists Festival
- 1990: Preservation Pioneer Award of Detroit
- 1990: Living Legacy Award, National Black Caucus
- 2022: Love was featured in Detroit mural project City Walls
