= Notre Dame Glee Club =

Glee Club at the University of Notre Dame

The Notre Dame Glee Club is a 75-voice, all-male choral ensemble at the University of Notre Dame. Founded in 1915 in the tradition of English and American glee clubs, it is the oldest Glee Club at a Catholic University in the United States.

== History ==
=== Founding and development ===
Samuel Ward Perrott founded the Notre Dame Glee Club in 1915. Perrott had studied at Notre Dame (1912–1914, 1915–1916) as well as Harvard University (1914–1915). While at Harvard, Perrott joined the Harvard Glee Club under direction of Archibald Davison. According to the 1916 edition of Notre Dame's yearbook, the Dome, it was at Harvard that Perrott "got the idea of how a (glee) club should be run." Perrott returned to Notre Dame again as a student in the fall of 1915 and held auditions for a Glee Club. At these first auditions, one hundred young men tried out for fifty places. Thus the Notre Dame Glee Club was born.

The Glee Club first took the stage on December 11, 1915, in Washington Hall on the campus of the University of Notre Dame and performed to a receptive audience. The student magazine, The Scholastic, called the performance "a triumph" and the Dome observed, "Before this time there had been grave doubts expressed about the success of the club," but with the first concert, the clouds of doubt were dispelled. Perrott began plans for a major concert tour. Although the major tour plans fell through, the Glee Club did perform its first tour concert in Indianapolis, IN on May 6, 1916.

== The Glee Club today ==
For formal performances, the group members wear formal evening dress (White tie). On other occasions the group performs in matching blazer and necktie, matching polo shirts, or in street clothes.

The club performs four annual campus concerts, one in Autumn, one at Christmas (three consecutive performances of the same program, the proceeds of which go to the South Bend Center for the Homeless and Food Bank), one in Spring, and one for commencement. All major concerts have been performed in the 950-seat Leighton Concert Hall in the DeBartolo Performing Arts Center (DPAC). Before the construction of the DPAC, the concerts took place in Washington Hall, which can seat 550 people.

The group or portions of it perform other concerts over the course of the year. These include ND in Revue (Saturday mornings before each ND home football game), joint concerts with other campus and outside ensembles, events in and around the South Bend area, and certain University functions. The group has partnered with visiting artists; in recent years, these have included Ronan Tynan, Leon Fleisher, Dave Brubeck, Vince Gill, and the Kronos Quartet. The group also partners with the South Bend Symphony Orchestra; pieces they have performed together in recent years include Symphony No. 2 (Mahler), the 1812 Overture, and Alexander Nevsky. Every year the group sings at Mass in the Basilica of the Sacred Heart, Notre Dame on the Feast of the Immaculate Conception.

== In popular culture ==
The Glee Club performs in songs in the film Rudy, especially during scenes of football games at Notre Dame Stadium. These songs include the Notre Dame Victory March and Hike, Notre Dame.

The Glee Club also performed on The Ed Sullivan Show on April 5, 1953. The songs that the group performed were Home! Sweet Home!, When Johnny Comes Marching Home, Hallelujah and Amen, and the Notre Dame Victory March.

== See also ==
- List of collegiate glee clubs
- Choir
