= Morehouse College Glee Club =

The Morehouse College Glee Club, founded in 1911, is the official choral group of Morehouse College. The Glee Club has a long tradition of many notable public appearances, having performed at Martin Luther King Jr.'s funeral, President Jimmy Carter's inauguration, Super Bowl XXVIII, the 1996 Summer Olympics in Atlanta, and Jimmy Carter's funeral ceremony. The Glee Club's international performances include tours in Africa (Senegal, Ethiopia, Ghana, Uganda, and Nigeria), Russia, Poland and the Caribbean. The group also appeared on the soundtrack for the movie School Daze, directed by Morehouse alumnus Spike Lee (Class of 1979).

== History ==
The Morehouse College Glee Club was founded in 1911, stemming from an established singing tradition at Morehouse. Small musical ensembles, including quartets, are attested at Morehouse as early as the 1870s. From 1903 to 1911, a choral ensemble and orchestra were directed by Georgia Starr, Lucy Z. Reynolds, and Grace D. Walesman. In 1911, upon joining the Morehouse faculty, founding director Kemper Harreld assumed directorship of both groups and founded the Glee Club. Harreld would go on to direct the Glee Club and head the Morehouse music department for 42 years. Under his direction, the Glee Club and Quartet performed at least three times for President Franklin D. Roosevelt.

In 1953, Harreld's student Dr. Wendell Phillips Whalum assumed directorship of the group. Under Whalum's leadership, the group sang at the funeral of Dr. Martin Luther King, Jr. and performed at President Jimmy Carter's inauguration. Whalum led the group on a tour of five African nations in 1972, visiting Senegal, Ghana, Uganda, Nigeria, and Ethiopia. In the fall of 1987, David E. Morrow, a student of Dr. Whalum, became director; under his leadership the group participated in the 1996 Summer Olympics closing ceremonies and sang at Super Bowl XXVIII.

The Morehouse College Glee Club can be heard on the soundtracks to the Spike Lee films School Daze (1988) and Miracle at St. Anna (2008), and in performance with the Atlanta Symphony Orchestra and Atlanta Symphony Chorus under the direction of Robert Shaw in the 1998 television special Christmas with Robert Shaw.

Since the mid-1920s, it's been tradition for the Glee Clubs from Morehouse College and Spelman College to collaborate for an annual Holidays concert in Atlanta every December.

== Notable alumni ==
Notable alumni of the Morehouse College Glee Club include:

- Willis Laurence James, musician and educator
- Babatunde Olatunji, Nigerian drummer and recording artist
- Maynard Jackson, first African-American mayor of Atlanta
- James Stovall, Broadway musician
- Canton Jones, Christian hip-hop artist
- Byron Cage, Gospel singer
- Herman Cain, politician, businessman, author
- Anthony Preston, songwriter, music producer

== See also ==
- List of collegiate glee clubs
