= Joyce Johnson (organist) =

American organist and music professor

Joyce Finch Johnson (born Joyce Finch in Bowling Green, Kentucky) is Professor Emerita of music at Spelman College in Atlanta where she taught for more than 50 years. She has been the organist at Spelman since 1955. In April 1968, as slain civil rights leader Martin Luther King Jr. lay in state at Spelman's Sister's Chapel for 48 hours, it was Johnson who played the organ while 20,000 people filed past to pay their respects. In July 2023, she played the organ at the college's memorial service for MLK's sister Christine King Farris.

== Biography ==
Joyce Finch was born in Bowling Green, Kentucky, where she graduated from State Street High School. Her mother taught piano lessons and by age nine, Finch, who had learned to play by ear, was playing hymns in local churches. She studied classical piano music and gave her first recital at age eleven in Ashland, Kentucky.

She entered Fisk University in 1949 where she studied piano under William Duncan Allen and music theory under John Wesley Work III. She graduated from Fisk in 1953, the same year as future Spelman College colleague Etta Zuber (later Falconer).

In 1953 John Wesley Work III recommended Finch to Spelman College Glee Club director Willis Laurence James for a teaching position and she began her 50 career at Spelman that same year. In 1955 following the retirement of Kemper Harreld she became college organist.

She pursued graduate work at Northwestern University, Cleveland Institute of Music and the Eastman School of Music, studying piano and organ with teachers including Karel Paukert and David Craighead. By now she had married Aaron Johnson. In 1971 she earned her doctorate in piano at Northwestern, thereby becoming the first African American woman to do so.

In addition to a long academic career in the music department at Spelman, including serving for many years as chairperson, Johnson had a parallel career performing publicly on both piano and organ. She performs as both a soloist and accompanist, playing chamber music concerts, and performing with various symphony orchestras, and especially with the Spelman College Glee Club.

She has become a role model for organists, especially as an inspiration for young black girls.

She is on the International Roster of Steinway Artists.

Since 1978 she has been a Member Laureate of Sigma Alpha Iota International Music Fraternity.

== Awards ==
In 2014 she garnered the Professional Fraternity Association (PFA) Career Achievement Award from Sigma Alpha Iota.

In August 2020 Johnson was presented with the Edward A. Hansen Leadership Award by the American Guild of Organists (AGO).
