= Kemper Harreld =

American musician (1885–1971)

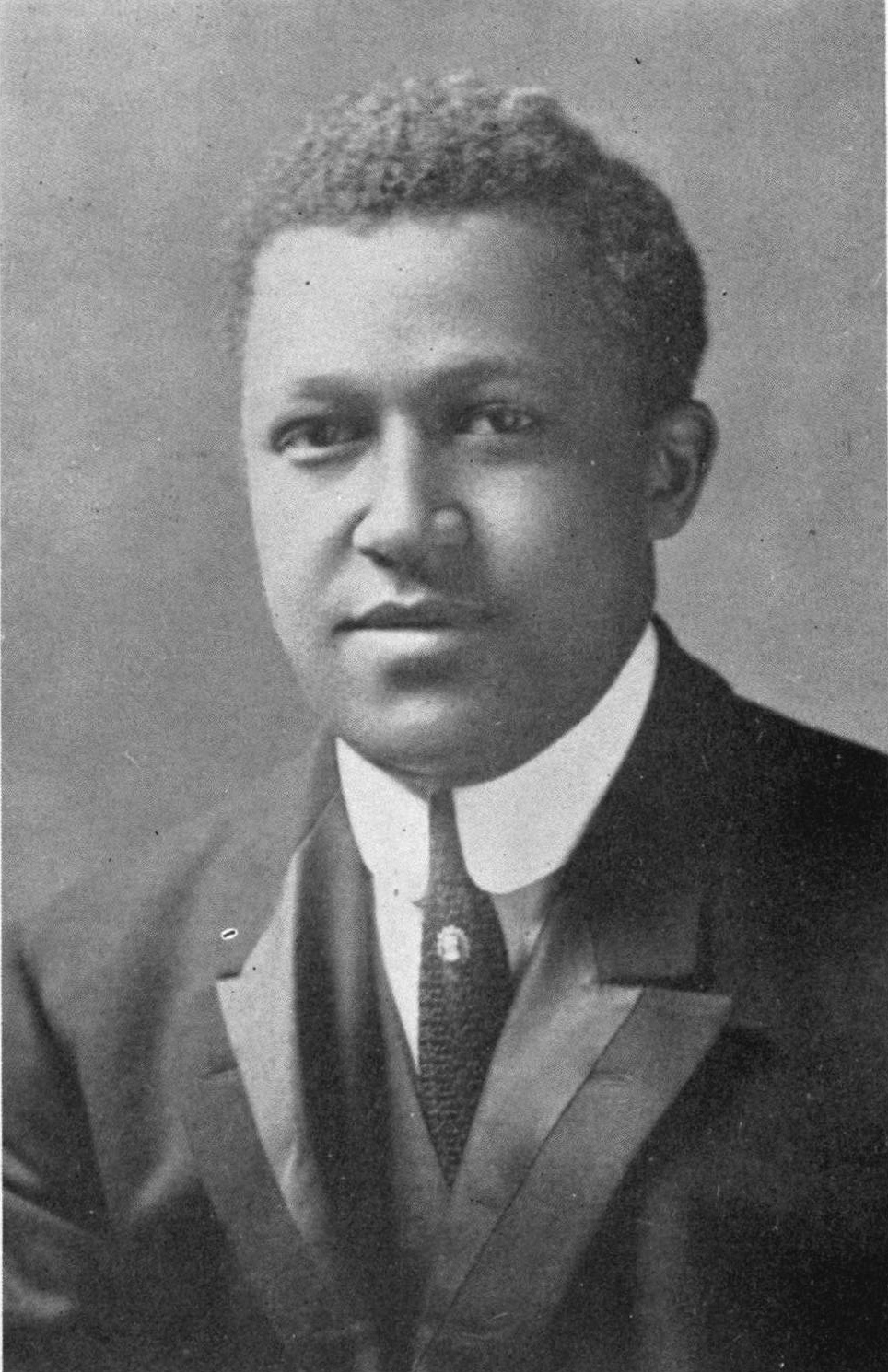
- Born: January 31, 1885; Muncie, Indiana
- Died: 1971 (aged 85–86)
- Education: Chicago Musical College
- Known for: Concert violinist and music educator
- Children: Josephine Harreld Love

William Kemper Harreld (January 31, 1885, Muncie, Indiana – 1971) was an American concert violinist. He was also a pianist and organist.

A graduate of Chicago Musical College, Harreld performed until 1911 when he became head of the music department at Atlanta Baptist College (now Morehouse College). He intended to teach music at Morehouse for only one term, but served for 42 years as professor and chair of the music department. Harreld officially established the Morehouse College Glee Club in 1911, and served as the organization's first director. He also founded the Spelman College Glee Club in 1925 and served as its first director. For a time, he served simultaneously as the chair of the music department of Spelman College as well as Morehouse. His students included Edmund Jenkins and Wendell P. Whalum. When Harreld retired in 1953, Whalum succeeded him as director of the Morehouse College Glee Club, and Joyce Johnson succeeded him as Spelman College organist.

Harreld died in the beginning of 1971 and his funeral was held on February 27. The glee club that he had established, and which achieved international acclaim, performed at his funeral.

Harreld's music was recorded and distributed by the Pace Phonograph Company's Black Swan Records label.

== Personal life ==
Kemper Harreld married poet Claudia Turner White, the daughter of William J. White (journalist). Harreld taught his daughter, Josephine Harreld Love, to play violin and piano. Love became a concert pianist, arts administrator, and musicologist.

== Bibliography ==
- Eileen Southern, The Music of Black Americans: A History. W. W. Norton & Company; 3rd edition. ISBN 0-393-97141-4
