= University of Michigan Men's Glee Club =

American choir

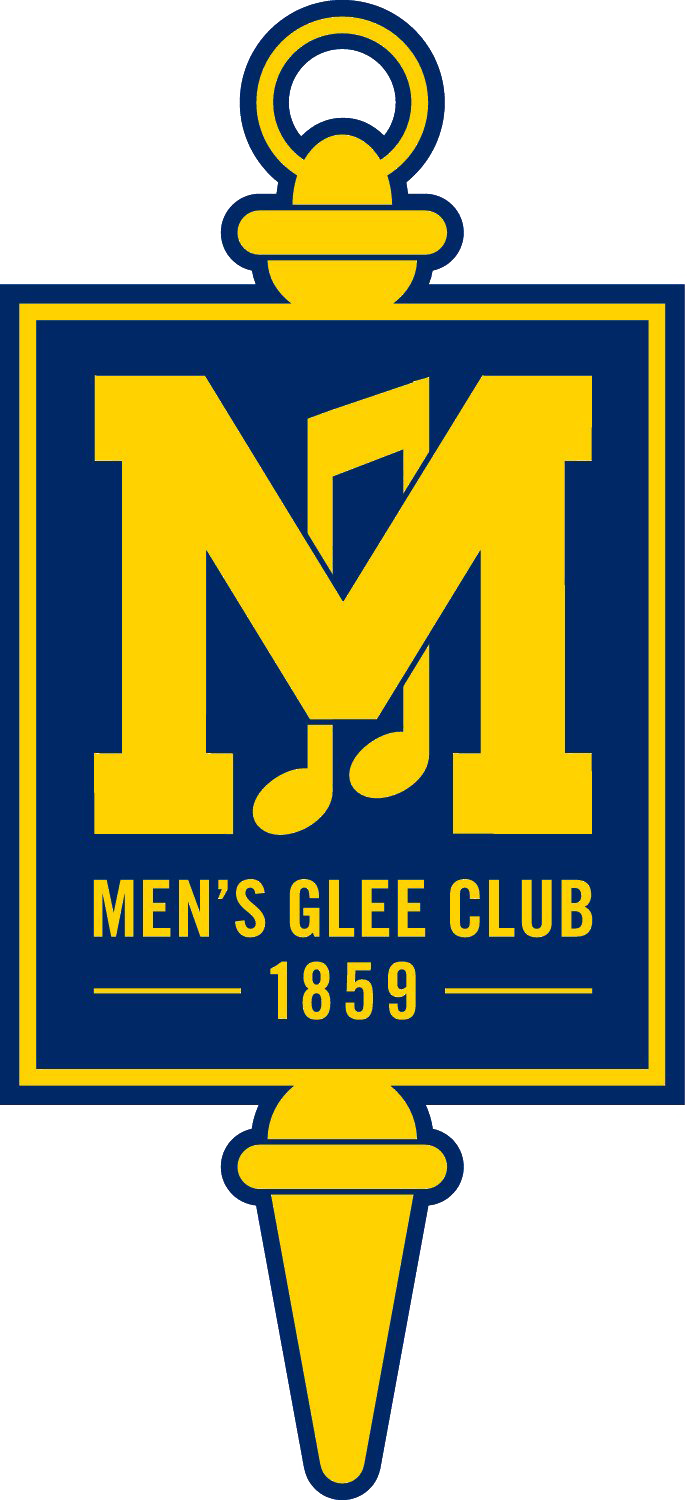
- "The Key", the club's official logo
- Formation: 1876 (origins tracing to 1859)
- Founded at: University of Michigan
- Type: Student organization
- Director: Matthew Abernathy
- Award: Llangollen International Musical Eisteddfod (4)
- Website: www.ummgc.org

The University of Michigan Men's Glee Club is a tenor-bass glee club (or choir) at the University of Michigan. With roots tracing back to 1859, it is the second oldest glee club in the United States and is the oldest student organization at the university. The club has won the Llangollen International Musical Eisteddfod on four occasions. Since 2025, the Club's musical director has been Matthew Abernathy, who has continued to expand the Club's repertoire and arranged performances.

The origins of the club stem from a variety of groups that came together in 1876. After a number of years including banjo and mandolin players in the club, it reverted to simply a vocal group by the mid-1920s. It received a substantial rise in profile under the directory of Philip Duey in the 1950s, who organized national, then international tours, and numerous television appearances. Since then, the club has continued to tour internationally at high-profile venues.

The club is entirely managed by students, except for the musical director, taken from the university staff, and has a number of traditions.

== Organization ==
The club is a student-managed organization, which undertakes all management facilities, including all finances and tour arrangements. Only the musical director is a member of the faculty. It accepts members from both undergraduates and graduates of the university, who are chosen by audition. Membership is made up of the majority of the university's 17 colleges. Originally founded as an all-male group, the club is now inclusive of non-binary individuals.

The group is composed of about 100 singers from several of the schools and colleges at the University of Michigan. They perform repertoire ranging from music of the Renaissance to African-American spirituals. Their official motto is "In Tradition, Camaraderie, and Musical Excellence".

A number of traditions are upheld and recognized by choristers. Club members snap their fingers instead of clapping at each other's achievements (e.g. a good performance on a solo) because it is difficult to clap with a beer in the hand. The club hosts a banquet every spring where awards are presented.

== History ==
=== Incarnations and early tours ===
Originally, there were individual Glee Clubs consisting of ten to twenty members, arranged by graduating class. The current framework of a cross-college club started with eight members in 1876, doubling to sixteen in 1877. Amongst their early repertoire included numbers written by Fred Newton Scott. In the 1890s, the organisation gained a banjo and mandolin club, causing the name to temporarily change to the University Glee, Banjo, and Mandolin Club. A Freshman Glee Club was active during the 1890s and 1900s.

In the early twentieth century, the club held operas to help raise funds to build the Michigan Union. Because the club was male-only, all female parts were played by men. Several popular songs performed by the club, like "The Bum Army" and "Ann Arbor Days", were written during this time.

In 1908, the club began to be led by the university faculty, although its official history still notes that this was merely an "advisory" role for over a decade later. By 1914, the club included two other groups; the Varsity Quartette and the Midnight Sons, which allowed singers to tackle barbershop and similar music requiring less singers.

The "Banjo" was dropped from the name in 1905, and "Mandolin" in 1923, after which the group concentrated on vocal performances without instrumentation, becoming the University of Michigan Glee Club. The group was renamed the University of Michigan Men's Glee Club in 1938, in reference to a Women's Glee Club that had gained popularity during the 1930s, and between 1944 and 1948 was briefly known as the University of Michigan Varsity Club.

For most of the twentieth century, the club toured locally around Michigan, but did tour across other US states in 1926 and 1941. World War II prevented any touring, which did not resume until 1947.

=== The Duey years and later tours ===
Philip Duey took over conducting duties in 1947 and began increasing the Club's profile with radio and television performances. In 1947, the group started recording numbers, including "The Friar's Song" and "'Tis of Michigan We Sing" to be broadcast on local radio. In 1951, the Glee Club performed with the Cornell Glee Club, beginning a tradition of performing alongside schools that were playing Michigan's football team. The following year, they made a national television appearance on Ed Sullivan's "Toast of the Town". In 1954, they performed for an RKO film titled Songs of the Colleges.

In 1955 the club toured Europe, where they performed for Queen Juliana of the Netherlands and at the American Embassy in Rome. In 1958, the club made another national television appearance on the Pat Boone Show.

In 1956, Dr. Walter Collins temporarily took over leadership of the club from Duey. During his tenure, an associated group, known as The Friars, was formed. It is named after a former drinking club at the university, and specializes in parodies of popular songs.

The European tour in 1959 commemorated the centennial of the Glee Club. In addition to a four-week concert tour, the group competed in the International Eisteddfod in Llangollen, Wales, one of the world's most significant choral competitions. The boat the club were traveling on was nearly a day late arriving, nearly missing the competition, and they performed having had only three hours sleep. But the club went on to win the competition, becoming the first American winner of the men's division.

In 1963, the group undertook a five-week tour and performed at the American Ambassador's residence in Athens and at the American Embassy in London. The club took first prize in the Llangollen Eisteddfod for a second time, winning over 20 groups from 11 countries. In 1967, the club undertook a world tour of 17 nations, including the Soviet Union. The club returned to Llangollen, where they took third place in the contest. third place. In March 1969, Duey retired after 22 years of service.

The club toured Europe again in 1971 with new musical director Willis Patterson and won the Eisteddfod for a third time. This feat was repeated for a fourth time in 1978 under the direction of Leonard Johnson, marking four occasions when the club had won the competition. The Glee Club awards four "Llangollen Awards" each year to celebrate these four victories.

In September 1965 the club represented the United States at the first International University Choral Festival alongside groups from Harvard University, Smith College, and Howard University.

=== Modern era ===
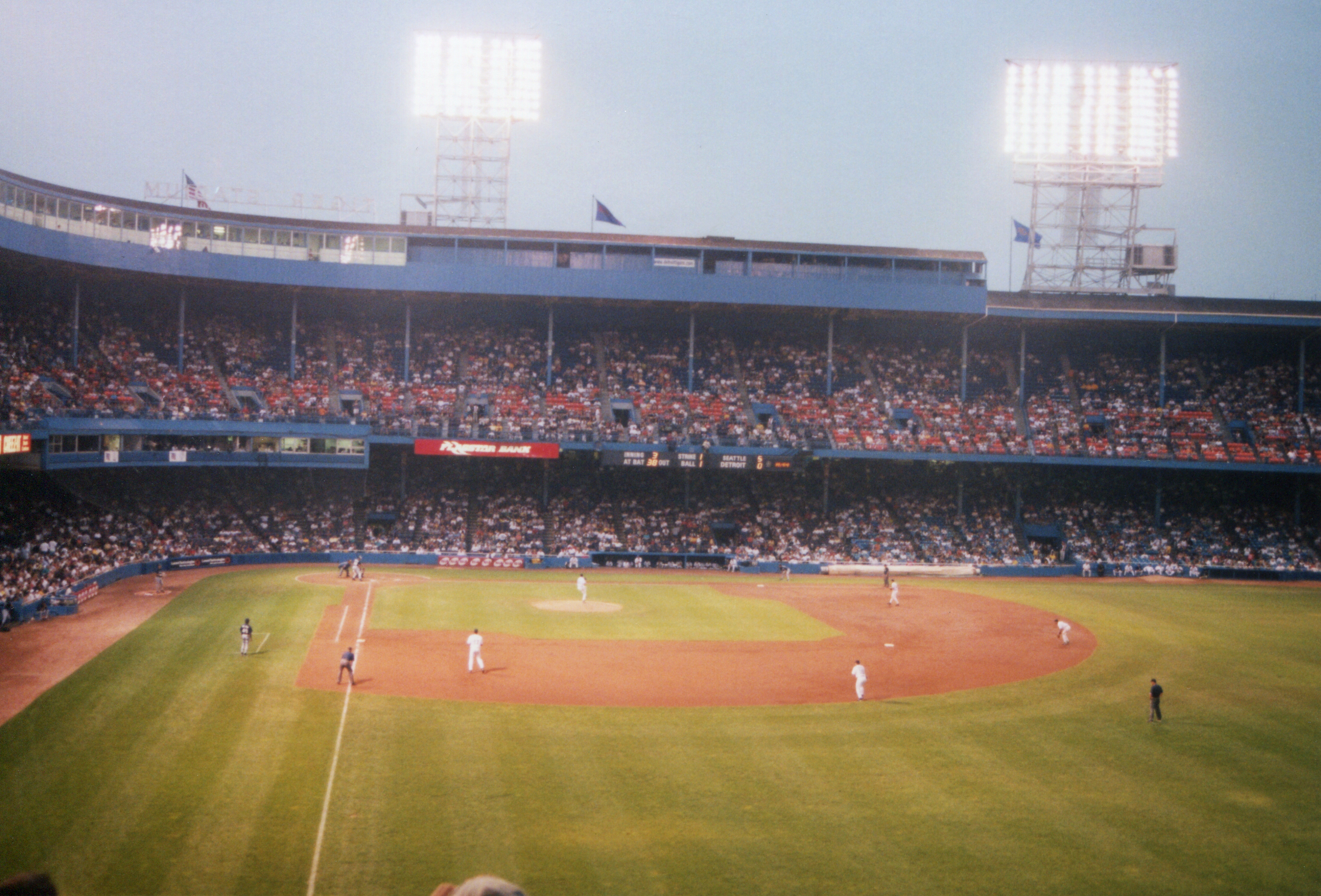
The club appeared at the 1984 World Series at Tiger Stadium in Detroit

The club performed at Tiger Stadium before the final game of the 1984 World Series, but their performance was overshadowed by scenes of violence and rioting after the game. Their tour bus was set upon by rioters, who vandalized it, while the singers fled to safety. A more favorable appearance occurred the following year when, under the direction of Patrick Gardner, the club undertook a 36-day tour across Europe, which culminated in another appearance at Llangollen, where they placed third.

Under the direction of Jerry Blackstone, the club embarked on four major overseas tours. In 1989 they toured Asia with concerts in Hong Kong, Japan, and South Korea over the course of three weeks. This was followed by a tour of Eastern Europe in 1992. In 1996 the club performed in Brazil, Argentina, Uruguay, Chile, and Peru, and in 2000 the club toured Australia.

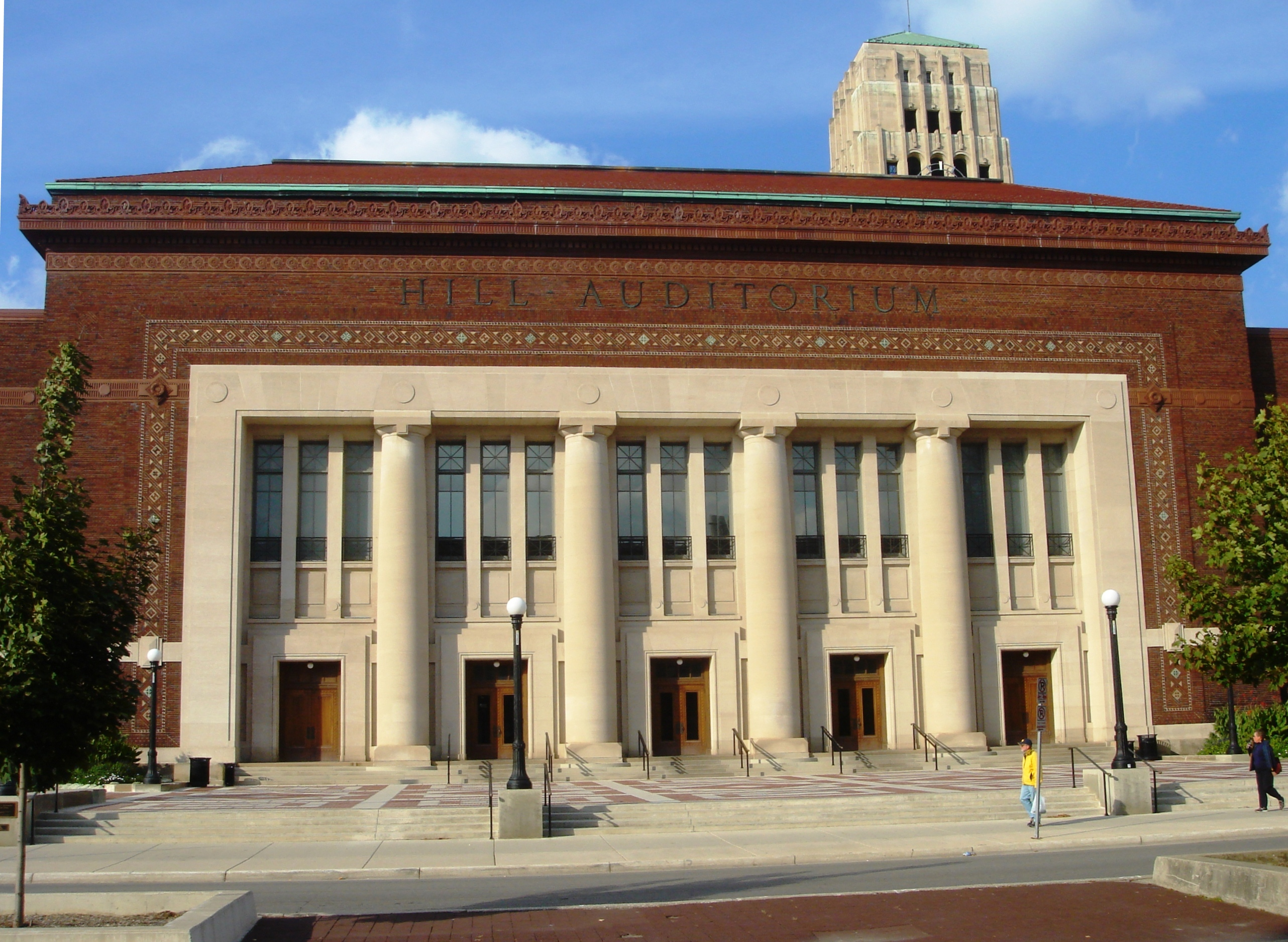
In 2002, the club performed a joined concert in Hill Auditorium with the university's Women's Glee Club and that of Smith College

The Club also performed at American Choral Directors Association conventions. It released six recordings and was featured on Mannheim Steamroller's 2001 album Christmas Extraordinaire, with Blackstone co-credited as choir director. In 2001 the combined Men's Glee Club and Smith College Glee Club and Chorale gave a performance of Brahms' Ein deutsches Requiem in Northampton, Massachusetts. They performed the same work the next year with the Smith and Michigan Women's Glee Clubs. Blackstone retired in 2002, with the club's CD I have had singing being a retrospective of his tenure as conductor. His time spent conducting the club has been well-received, with the secretary of the Warsaw Philharmonica stating, "I was completely enchanted. It is unbelievable that an amateur group could surpass our most professional choirs with such ease of execution."

Stephen Lusmann took over leadership until 2005; highlights of his tenure include an appearance at the Intercollegiate Men's Choruses National Convention at Harvard University, a sixteen-day tour of Great Britain and Ireland in 2004 and the club's premiere performance at Carnegie Hall with the Smith College Glee Club in 2005.

From 2005 to 2011, the Club was under the direction of Paul Rardin. Notable achievements during this time include international tours to Spain in 2008 and Cuba in 2011. The Cuban tour was considered especially significant, given that Americans have not easily been able to travel to the country legally, but the University gave financial assistance and an offer of a cultural exchange to make the tour happen. In 2010, the club celebrated its 150th anniversary, and as part of the celebrations performed a set of joint concerts with the Harvard University and University of Virginia Glee Clubs, taking a variety of music including contemporary American songs, folk and Renaissance music. Rardin said "It's a wonderful opportunity for all of us to see, hear and learn from three different ensembles."

Rardin left the University of Michigan after the Cuban tour to accept the position of Director of Choirs at Temple University in 2011. As of the fall term of 2011, Eugene Rogers assumed direction of the club. Notable achievements during his tenure include an international tour to China in 2012, a major tour of the East Coast of the United States which concluded in a joint concert with the Glee Clubs of Harvard and Yale universities, and the nationwide extension of the Club's Brothers in Song program which partners with underserved young men's choral programs in public schools. Starting in the fall of 2018, Mark Stover assumed the role of director. There was a planned spring 2020 tour to South America that was cancelled due to the COVID-19 pandemic. It was later announced that the club would embark on the South America tour in spring 2024, visiting the countries of Brazil, Argentina, and Peru. As of 2025, Matthew Abernathy has been directing the club.

The club continues to collaborate with others. Tom Harle, MD of the Naperville Glee Club said, "There's a lot to be said about them. They're one of the most prestigious and one of the oldest men's glee clubs in the country."

== List of directors ==
Years active	Name
1877	William Murphy
1878	Prof. De Prosse
1879–1885	Isaac C. Goff
1885–1887	Harold B. Wilson
1887–1889	Rossetter G. Cole
1890–1892	Albert A. Stanley
1893	Silas R. Mills
1893–1908	No director from the music faculty was appointed at this time. Until the 1920s, directors were only in an advisory role.
1908–1911	Earle Killeen
1912–1914	William A. Howland
1915–1919	Theodore Harrison
1920	Russell Carter
1921	William B. Wheeler
1922–1923	Frank L. Thomas
1924	George O. Bowen
1925–1930	Theodore Harrison
1931	Arthur Hackett
1932–1947	David Mattern
1947–1955	Philip Duey
1956	Walter S. Collins (acting)
1957–1969	Philip Duey
1969–1975	Willis Patterson
1976–1981	Leonard Johnson
1982–1987	Patrick Gardner
1988	Bradley Bloom
1989–2002	Jerry Blackstone
2003–2005	Stephen Lusmann
2005–2011	Paul Rardin
2011–2018	Eugene Rogers
2018–2024	Mark Stover
2025-present	Matthew Abernathy

== Notable alumni ==
- Ara Berberian, Metropolitan Opera Basso
- Rob Bisel, Grammy award winning producer and songwriter best known for his work on SOS (SZA album).
- Russell Christopher, Metropolitan Opera, Baritone.
- Thomas Dewey, three-time governor of New York and two-time Republican Presidential candidate
- Sanjay Gupta, Neurosurgeon, and CNN senior medical correspondent.
- Steven Kronauer, Conductor of Young Men's Ensemble at Los Angeles Children's Chorus.
- Jeff Marx, co-composer of Avenue Q.
- Bob McGrath, singer and actor who formerly played "Bob" on Sesame Street.

== See also ==
- List of collegiate glee clubs
- Yale Glee Club
