= Amherst College Glee Club =

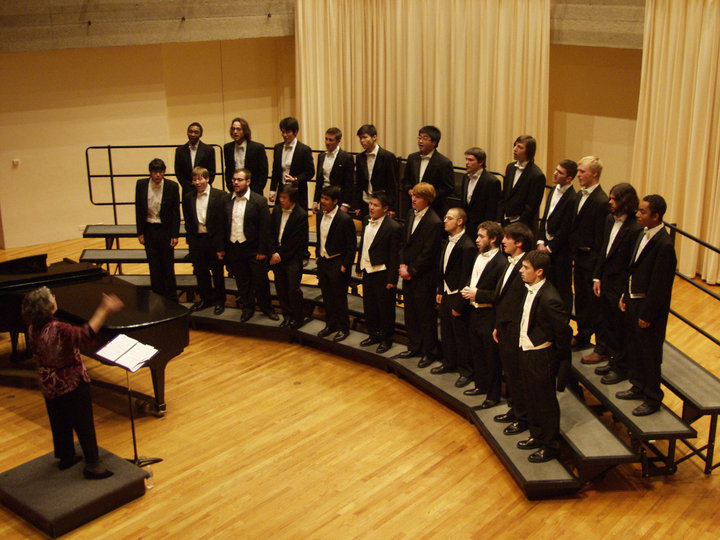

Background information
- Origin: Amherst, Massachusetts
- Genres: Classical
- Years active: 1865–present

The Amherst College Glee Club, founded in 1865, is an SATB vocal ensemble, and one of the oldest continuous student organizations at Amherst College. It is part of the Amherst College Choral Society, along with the Concert Choir, and the Madrigal Singers. Previous a Tenor/Bass ensemble, in 2022 it came to encompass all voices in the Choral Society, merging with the Chorus. The club has a history of extensive international touring, having to date performed in over 55 countries. It is currently directed by Dr. Arianne Abela.

== History ==
=== Founding ===
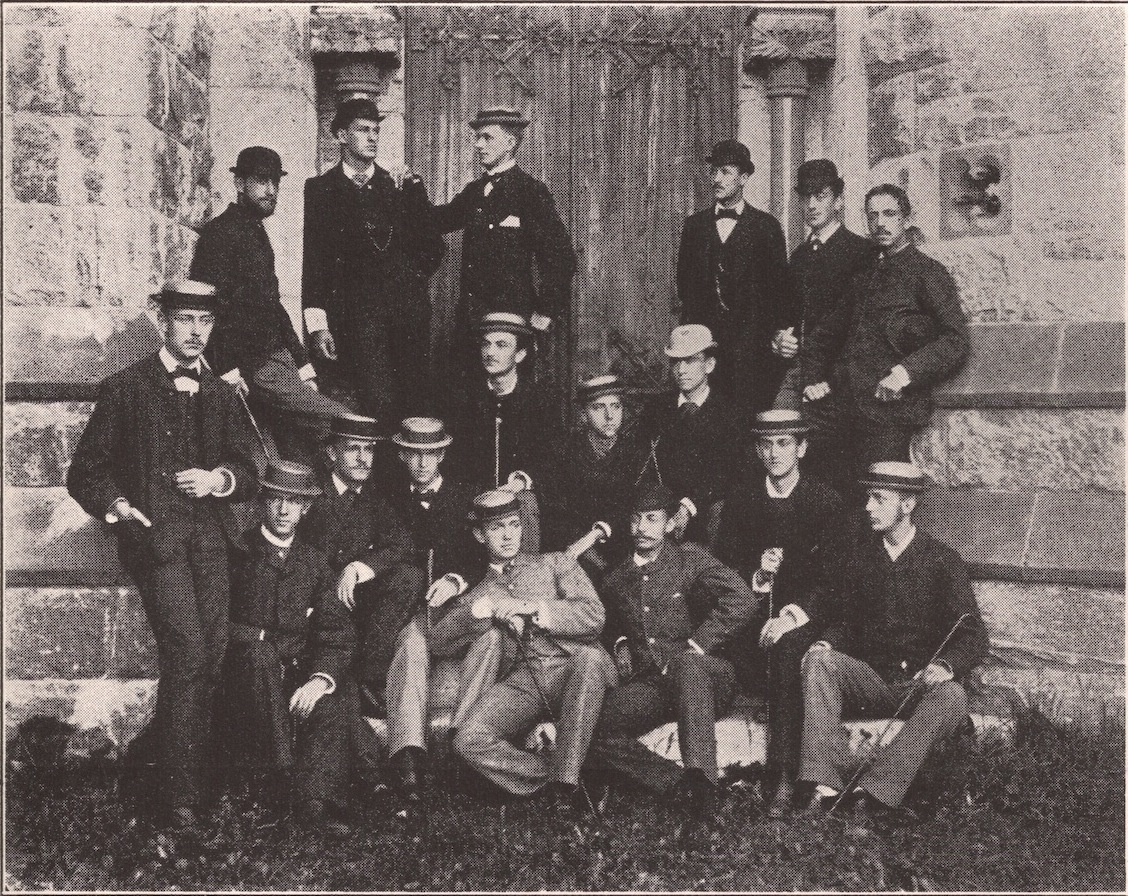
The club, circa 1880

The club was founded as a student-directed double quartet in the spring semester of 1865 by Amherst senior Thomas E. Babb, in the spirit of Amherst's recently dissolved Donizetti Glee Club, founded in 1862. Though the group nearly disbanded two years later when all but one of its members graduated, it was revived in 1868 after one lone year of inactivity. It continued to flirt with dissolution — some years being quite active and successful and others less so — until the fall of 1876 when it came under the professional direction and training of "Professor" Friedrich Zuchtmann, a vocal instructor from Springfield, Massachusetts. Under his leadership the club found more firm footing and soon became a permanent fixture of Amherst College life.

=== Early accomplishments ===
In 1894 the Amherst Glee Club became one of the first American collegiate groups to travel to England. In 1925 they sang at the White House for President Coolidge, and they twice won the New England Intercollegiate Glee Club Contest - once in 1928 and once in 1934.

=== Coming to maturity ===
In 1963 the club came under the direction of Bruce G. McInnes, former director of the Apollo Glee Club at Yale University. Under this new leadership, Glee Club membership rose from under 30 in 1962 to over 100 in 1965. In 1967 the club embarked on the first of several "World Tours". These tours, each lasting over a month, eventually took the Glee Club all over the globe and featured a number of notable performances. They became the first American chorus to sing High Mass at the Notre Dame Cathedral, and sang for many notable people, including Pope Paul VI, King Mihendra and Queen Ratna of Nepal, president Jomo Kenyatta of Kenya, President Félix Houphouët-Boigny of the Ivory Coast, Princess Sarvath El Hassan of Jordan Prime Minister Menachem Begin of Israel, and noted composition teacher Nadia Boulanger.

=== Present ===
The club continues to perform both locally and internationally. In their 2007 tour to Estonia they sang for Prime Minister Andrus Ansip and President Toomas Hendrik Ilves. In 2022, all members of the Choral Society were made members of the Glee Club, and the Soprano/Alto Chorus was disbanded.

== International tours ==
- 1894 - England
- 1928 - Bermuda
- 1961 - France, Italy, Spain, Switzerland
- 1967 - "World Tour" - France, Italy, Greece, Austria, Germany, Czechoslovakia, USSR, Sweden, Denmark
- 1969 - "World Tour" - Japan, Korea, Taiwan, Thailand, Nepal, Iran, Lebanon, Greece, Yugoslavia, Austria, Czechoslovakia, France
- 1972 - "African-Asian Tour" - Liberia, Ivory Coast, Malawi, Zambia, Kenya, Pakistan, Afghanistan, Iran, Lebanon, England
- 1975 - "World Tour" - Morocco, Algeria, Tunisia, Egypt, Jordan, Syria, Romania, Austria, France
- 1977 - "Latin American Tour" - Guatemala, Costa Rica, Colombia, Peru, Bolivia, Paraguay, Uruguay, Brazil, Suriname, Guyana, Trinidad
- 1979 - "International Tour" - Spain, Monaco, Tunisia, Syria, Jordan, Israel, Turkey, Austria, Poland, France
- 1983 - "World Tour" - United States, Japan, Korea, Taiwan, India, Austria, Italy, Monaco, France
- 1990 - USSR, Czechoslovakia
- 1995 - Poland, Czech Republic
- 1999 - Austria, Italy
- 2003 - Japan
- 2007 - Iceland, Estonia
- 2011 - Greece
- 2015 - Costa Rica
- 2019 - "Baltic Tour" - Estonia, Latvia, Lithuania
- 2023 - Mexico

== Notable alumni ==
- Albert II, Prince of Monaco
- Dan Brown, author
- Gregory W. Brown, composer
- John Coolidge, son of U.S. President Calvin Coolidge
- Philip Gossett, noted musicologist
- Caleb R. Layton, U.S. Representative for Delaware
- George Adams Leland, doctor and educator
- Edmund Phelps, awarded the 2006 Nobel Prize in Economics
- Calvin Coolidge, U.S. President
- David Eisenhower, grandson of U.S. President Dwight Eisenhower
- David Foster Wallace, American novelist, widely known for his 1996 novel Infinite Jest

== Directors ==
- 1865-1876 - Student directed
- 1872-1874 - Assisted by George Cheney
- 1876-1883 - Friedrich Zuchtmann
- 1883-1894 - Alternated between students and Edward L. Sumner
- 1894-1911 - Student directed (likely assisted by music professor William P. Bigelow '89)
- 1912-1931 - Charles W. Cobb ‘97
- 1932 - John J. Bishop
- 1932-1946 - Ralph H. Oatley ‘22
- 1946-1948 - Temporary hiatus for World War II
- 1948-1950 - Henry G. Mishkin
- 1951-1953 - Robert K. Beckwith
- 1954-1958 - Charles W. Ludington
- 1958-1962 - James Heywood Alexander
- 1963 (spring) - Charles M. Fassett
- 1963 (fall) - Bruce Archibald
- 1963-1985 - Bruce McInnes
- 1985-1986 - Mallorie Chernin and William McCorkle
- 1986–2018 - Mallorie Chernin
- 2018 (spring) - Gregory W. Brown
- 2018–Present - Arianne Abela
