= Yale Glee Club =

Chorus from Yale University

- Choir
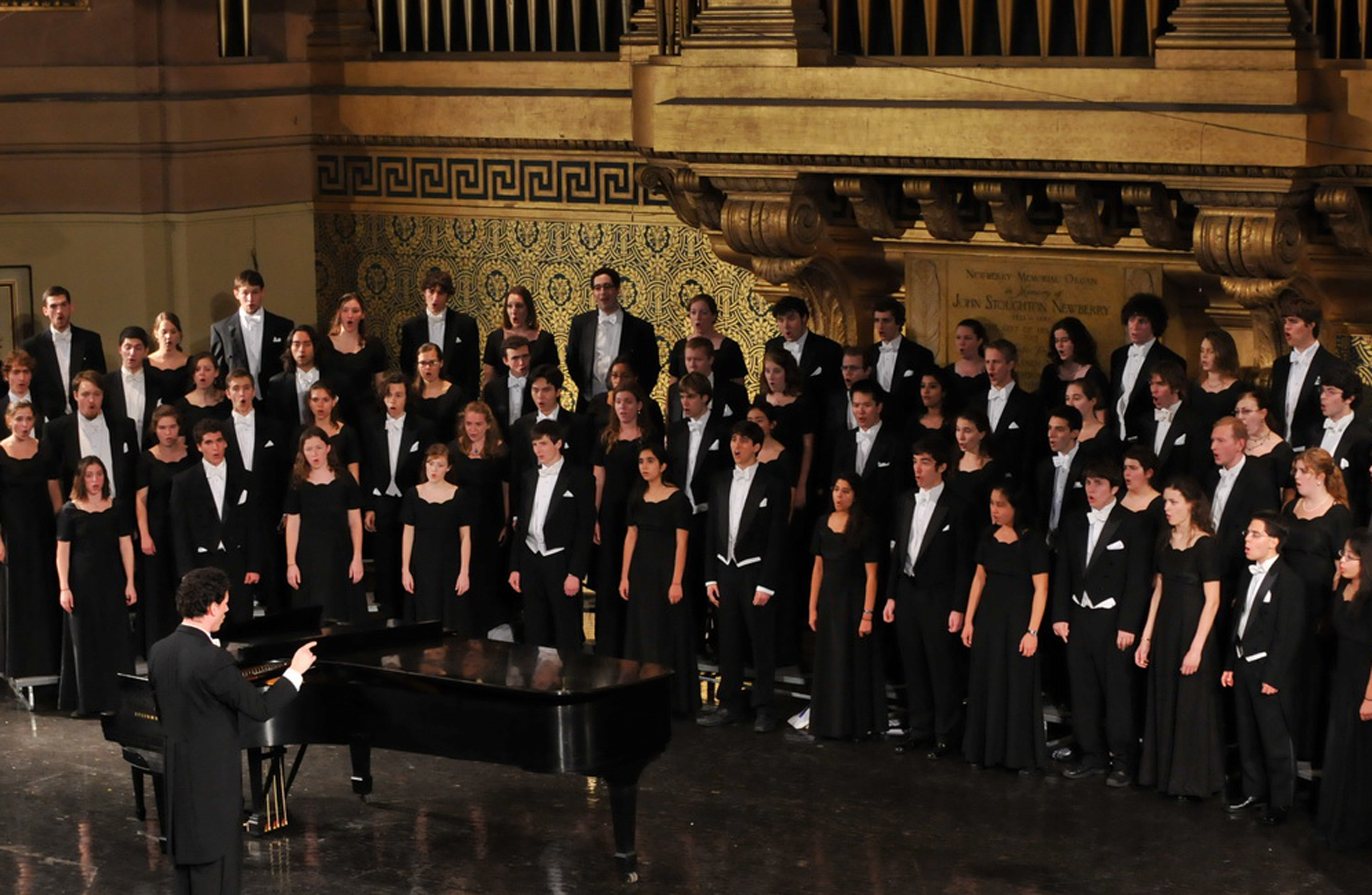
- Yale Glee Club performing in Woolsey Hall
- Origin: New Haven, Connecticut, U.S.
- Founded: 1861 (165 years ago)
- Genre: Choral
- Members: 80
- Music director: Jeffrey Douma
- Affiliation: Yale University
- Website: www.yalegleeclub.org

The Yale Glee Club is a mixed chorus of men and women, consisting of students of Yale University in New Haven, Connecticut. Founded in 1861, it is the third oldest collegiate chorus in the United States after the Harvard Glee Club, founded in 1858, and the University of Michigan Men's Glee Club, founded in 1859. The Glee Club performs several concerts each year in New Haven and goes on tour each January. According to music critic Zachary Woolfe of the New York Times, it is "one of the best collegiate singing ensembles, and one of the most adventurous." Its members are "world famous for their harmonic precision" per New York Times music critic Robert Sherman.

== Organization ==
=== Leadership ===
The Glee Club is conducted by a member of the university faculty, and the work of running the organization has traditionally been divided between the director, the office manager, and a team of undergraduate student officers. The Glee Club's director generally holds a faculty position in the Yale School of Music as the Marshall Bartholomew Professor of Choral Conducting. A large part of the work of planning concert tours is done by student tour managers.

=== Current membership ===
Most members of the Glee Club are undergraduate students, but the group also admits students from the graduate and professional schools. Membership in the group is determined each fall by audition. Members of the group may be majors in any subject. Many members of the group are also involved in other musical pursuits on campus. The Glee Club typically consists of 70 to 90 student singers. When large-scale classical choral works require more voices, the Glee Club may team up with Yale's other choruses, the Yale Camerata and the Yale Schola Cantorum, or add other singers as needed.

=== Past membership ===
The Glee Club was initially composed of men only (since Yale College was only open to men). In 1969, Yale admitted its first female undergraduates, which led to the establishment of the Yale Women's Chorus. The following year, the Yale Women's Chorus was absorbed into the Glee Club to form a mixed chorus. Despite the fact that a glee club is typically an all-male chorus, the organization elected to retain its name. Although the group was once open to students only after their first year of college, in 2003 the Glee Club began to include undergraduates from all four years. (In the early years of coeducation, women undergraduates were accepted into the Glee Club their first year.)

Several alumni of the group have gone on to professional careers in music, including Charles Ives, Douglas Moore, Cole Porter, John Stewart and Marshall Bartholomew, both of whom returned to Yale to conduct the Glee Club.

== Programs ==
The Glee Club works with New Haven high school students each year as part of an annual choral festival. Outreach and service activities incorporated into tours were a central focus of the Glee Club's 2007 domestic tour to the Gulf Coast states.

The Glee Club's annual Emerging Composers Competition encourages new works for mixed chorus, and the Fenno Heath Award encourages the creation of new Yale songs. Both competitions were inaugurated in the fall of 2005 with the world premieres of Laus Trinitati by Jocelyn Hagen and A Modern Toast to Yale by Zachary Sandler.

The Glee Club has an alumni association, the Yale Glee Club Associates, which offers advice and financial support to the Glee Club. The YGCA has formed a chorus of its own called the Yale Alumni Chorus. This chorus gives alumni an opportunity to resume old friendships and enjoy the songs of their Glee Club years while traveling and giving concerts in foreign countries.

== History ==
Like many of the old American college Glee Clubs, the Yale Glee Club began as a small association of students to sing glees. This tradition was continued for most of the 19th and early 20th century. Many of these original songs are maintained as part of the Glee Club's "Blue Book" (Songs of Yale), which contains the old glees and the principal Yale songs.

=== Directors ===
The Yale Glee Club has had seven directors since the appointment of its first faculty adviser:

- c. 1868-1873: Gustave J. Stoeckel
- 1873-1905: Thomas G. Shepard
- 1905-1921: G. Frank Goodale (Yale Sheffield Scientific School B.S. 1889)
- 1921-1953: Marshall Bartholomew (Yale Sheffield Scientific School B.S. 1907)
- 1953-1992: Fenno F. Heath, Jr. (Yale B.A. 1950, M.A. 1952)
- 1992-2002: David H. Connell (Yale D.M.A. 1991)
- 2002-2003: Timothy Snyder (Yale M.M. 1998) (interim director)
- 2003–present: Jeffrey Douma

The group's fourth director, Marshall Bartholomew, encouraged the group to undertake more difficult and classical works, adding considerably to the group's repertoire. He created arrangements of many spirituals and folk songs, many published by the G. Schirmer company as the "Yale Glee Club Series."

Bartholomew's successor, Fenno Heath, composed many original works and after 1970 rearranged many of his own and Bartholomew's pieces for mixed chorus when the Glee Club admitted women. David Connell continued the tradition of arranging pieces for the group, including madrigals and sea chanteys. Director Jeffrey Douma has also contributed his own arrangements to the Glee Club's library. Under his direction, the Glee Club has appeared in performances guest conducted by David Willcocks, Krzysztof Penderecki, Sir Neville Marriner, and Helmuth Rilling.

== Tours ==
The Glee Club has regularly made domestic tours since 1866 and international concert tours since 1928. Domestic tours occur annually and international tours typically occur every two or three years. Touring has helped the Glee Club find a mission as "ambassadors of song."

Today, tours are managed by a pair of current Glee Clubbers. The position of Tour Co-Manager is the only Glee Club office that is not chosen by election; rather, the director and staff manager appoint tour managers based on their submission of a proposed itinerary. Prospective tour co-managers write their proposal and apply together.

The Glee Club was one of the first U.S. college musical groups to tour abroad. International destinations of its many tours have included:

- Seventeen tours of Europe, with the original 1928 tour retraced for the Glee Club's 150th Anniversary in 2011
- South and/or Central America in 1941, 1961, 1968, 1975, and 2009
- A "'Round-the-world" tour in 1965
- East Asia in 1996
- Bermuda or the Caribbean in 1930, 1951, 2000, 2010, and 2014
- Five countries in Africa in 2002
- New Zealand and Australia in 2005
- Istanbul with the Yale Alumni Chorus in 2011
- Mainland China and Hong Kong in 2013
- Nairobi and Mombasa, Kenya in 2023
- Manilla and Bohol, Philippines in 2025
