= United States Military Academy Cadet Glee Club =

The United States Military Academy Glee Club was founded in 1903. The choir is a glee club made up of cadet students from the United States Military Academy, known as "West Point." Originally all male, the Glee Club, became a mixed-voice ensemble after the introduction of coeducation at the military academy. It has been described as "one of the most well-known collegiate singing groups in the world."

The Ballad of Rodger Young
Performed by the West Point Cadet Glee Club, 1959.

The Glee Club, then 125-voices strong, performed at Carnegie Hall in 1952 with the West Point Band to mark the military academy's 150th anniversary.

Astronaut Al Worden joined the Glee Club during his second year at the academy.

Lieut. Col. Francis E. Resta directed the choir until his retirement in 1957. Colonel William Schempf, the last holder of the academy title "Teacher of Music," conducted the Glee Club from 1957 to 1974. He was honored as "Conductor Emeritus" in 1990.

The Glee Club has recorded a number of albums, including 1959's The Cadet Glee Club, West Point, which received three stars from Billboard, signifying "Good Sales Potential."

The choir has appeared on television on the Ed Sullivan Show and, in 1973, on the Mike Douglas Show.

The Glee Club performed Mansions of the Lord in the closing credits of the 2002 movie We Were Soldiers.

== See also ==
The Corps (song)
