= Pittsburgh Panthers football =

Football team representing the University of Pittsburgh

2026 Pittsburgh Panthers football team
- First season: 1890; 136 years ago
- Athletic director: Allen Greene
- General manager: Graham Wilbert
- Head coach: Pat Narduzzi; 11th season, 85–63 (.574)
- Location: Pittsburgh, Pennsylvania
- Stadium: Acrisure Stadium (capacity: 68,400)
- NCAA division: Division I FBS
- Conference: ACC
- Colors: Blue and gold
- All-time record: 778–572–42 (.574)
- Bowl record: 15–23–0 (.395)

National championships
- Claimed: 1915, 1916, 1918, 1929, 1931, 1934, 1936, 1937, 1976
- Unclaimed: 1910, 1917, 1925, 1927, 1933, 1938, 1980, 1981

Conference championships
- Big East: 2004, 2010 ACC: 2021

Division championships
- ACC Coastal: 2018, 2021
- Heisman winners: Tony Dorsett – 1976
- Consensus All-Americans: 55
- Rivalries: West Virginia (rivalry); Notre Dame (rivalry); Syracuse (rivalry); Penn State (rivalry); Cincinnati (rivalry)

Uniforms
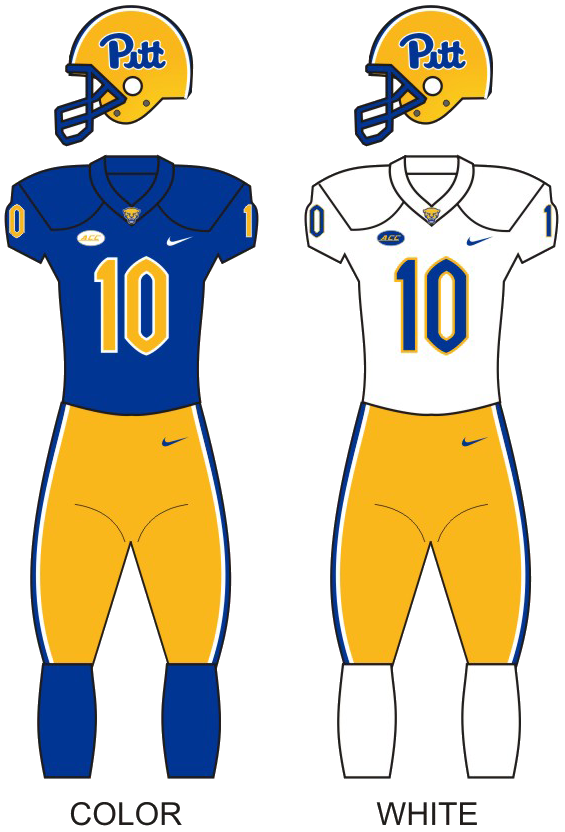
- Fight song: Hail to Pitt and Pitt Victory Song
- Mascot: Panther
- Marching band: University of Pittsburgh Varsity Marching Band
- Outfitter: Nike
- Website: pittsburghpanthers.com

The Pittsburgh Panthers football program is the intercollegiate football team of the University of Pittsburgh, often referred to as "Pitt", in Pittsburgh, Pennsylvania. Traditionally the most popular sport at the university, Pitt football has played at the highest level of American college football competition, now termed the NCAA Division I Football Bowl Subdivision, since the beginning of the school's official sponsorship of the sport in 1890. Pitt competes as a member of the Atlantic Coast Conference (ACC).

Pitt claims nine national championships, including two (1937, 1976) from major wire-service: AP Poll and Coaches' Poll, and is among the top 20 FBS college football programs in terms of all-time wins. Its teams have featured many coaches and players notable throughout the history of college football, including, among all schools, the 12th most College Football Hall of Fame inductees, the 8th most consensus All-Americans, and the third most Pro Football Hall of Fame inductees. The Panthers are coached by Pat Narduzzi. Pitt plays home games at Acrisure Stadium, formerly known as Heinz Field, which they share with the National Football League's (NFL) Pittsburgh Steelers and utilize the University of Pittsburgh Medical Center Sports Performance Complex as their practice facility.

== History ==
=== Early history (1889–1913) ===
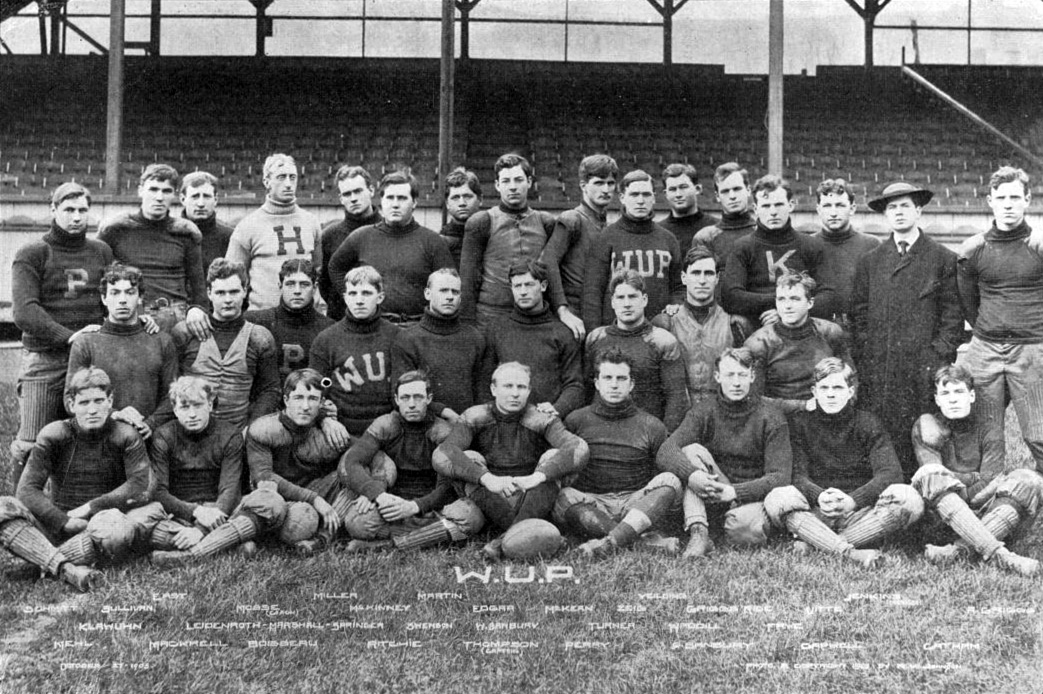
The 1905 football team was Arthur Mosse's last season as head coach in Pittsburgh. This team would go 10–2 while outscoring its opponents 405–36. Joseph H. Thompson, center of the front row, was the team captain.

Football at the University of Pittsburgh began in the fall of 1889 when the school was still known as the Western University of Pennsylvania or "WUP". College football at Pitt began a rise to prominence when Arthur St. Leger "Texas" Mosse was hired and led the school to one of the greatest turnarounds in college football history in 1904: an undefeated 10–0 season which surrendered only one touchdown on the way to collectively outscoring opponents 406–5. The undefeated 1904 season was followed by a 10–2 record under Mosse in 1905, as well as six additional winning seasons.

The Mosse coached squads featured team captain Joe Thompson, who played for WUP from 1904 to 1906, and obtained the head coaching position in 1909, after successful coach John A. Moorhead, who helped facilitate the first known use of numbers on the uniforms of football players in 1908. (Note: The Official NCAA Records Book credits Washington & Jefferson as being the first documented college football team to use uniform numbers in 1908, although photographic evidence indicates that numbers were worn by the 1907 WUP football team.) That same year, the university changed its name from Western University of Pennsylvania to the University of Pittsburgh, and it soon became known as "Pitt" among fans and students. The following year, in 1909, the school officially adopted the Panther as a mascot. Also in 1909, the school moved to the Oakland section of Pittsburgh where it remains to this day.

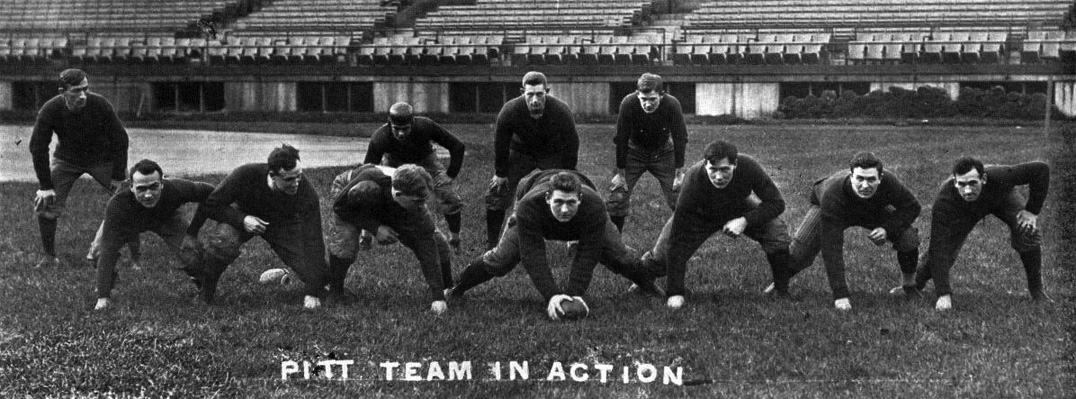
The 1910 team went undefeated and unscored upon, and is considered by many to be the 1910 national champion

Thompson coached at Pitt until 1912 and led the football team to a 22–11–2 record. The highlight of his coaching tenure was the 1910 season in which Pitt, led by star fullback Tex Richards, went undefeated for the second time in school history. Of even greater significance, the 1910 team was unscored upon, collectively outscoring its 9 opponents 282–0, and is considered by many to be that season's national champion. Winning continued under coach Joseph Duff, including an 8–1 record in 1914 in which opponents were collectively outscored 207–38, and the university was well on the way to establishing itself as a regional, if not yet national, power.

=== Pop Warner era (1914–1923) ===
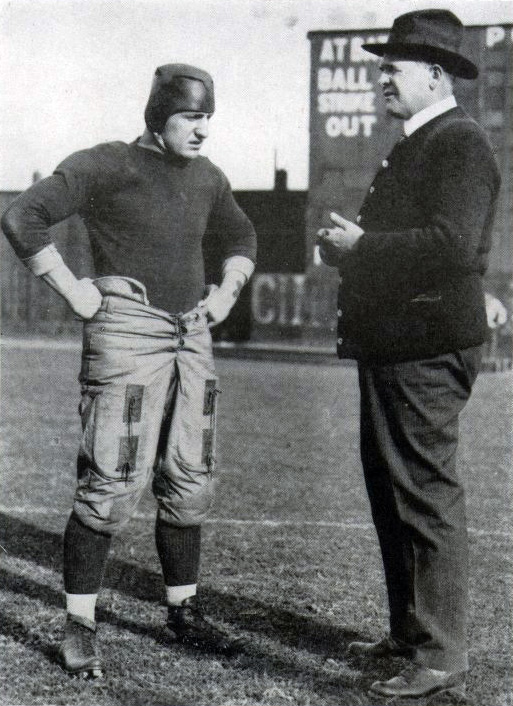
Hall of fame head football coach Pop Warner (right) with three-time All-American and team captain Bob Peck during the 1916 national championship season

In 1914, Pitt hired Pop Warner as Pitt's head coach. His arrival at Pitt gave the program instant national credibility, lifting the perception of the program from a regional power to that of a national one. Warner's impact was immediate. Led by center Robert Peck, Pitt's first First Team All-American, and All-American end James Pat Herron, Warner's first Pitt team in 1915 went 8–0, shutting out five opponents, and was trumpeted by football historian Parke H. Davis as that season's national champion. His second season duplicated that success, repeating an 8–0 record while collectively outscoring opponents 255–25, and garnering what is widely regarded as a consensus national championship. The 1916 team was led again by Herron and Peck, now in his last season, as well as All-Americans fullback Andy Hastings and guard "Tiny" Thornhill. Also on that team were Jock Sutherland and H.C. "Doc" Carlson, who both would garner First Team All-American selections while members of the undefeated 1917 team, and go on to become perhaps Pitt's most legendary coaches in football and basketball, respectively. The 1917 team, nicknamed "The Fighting Dentists" because over half the roster became doctors or dentists, finished 10–0 with five shutouts despite losing several players to military service at the outbreak of World War I. The Spanish flu pandemic of 1918, saw the implementation of quarantines that eliminated much of that year's college football season. All of Pitt's games that year were played in November, including a high-profile game played as a War Charities benefit against undefeated, unscored upon, and defending national champion Georgia Tech, coached by the legendary John Heisman. Pitt swept through its first two games and then dismantled Georgia Tech 32–0 in front of many of the nation's top sports writers including Walter Camp. The 1918 Panthers were named by multiple selectors as a national champion for that season.

For the 1921 season, Pitt made college football history on October 8, 1921. Harold W. Arlin announced the first live radio broadcast of a college football game in the United States from Forbes Field on KDKA radio as the Pitt Panthers defeated West Virginia 21–13 in the annual Backyard Brawl.

In all, Warner coached his Pitt teams to 33 straight wins and three national championships (1915, 1916 and 1918). He coached Pittsburgh from 1915 to 1923 to a combined 60–12–4 record. Warner helped raise the interest in Pitt football to the point where the university sought to build an on-campus stadium with increased seating capacity that would be dedicated to the football team, and the school began taking steps to secure the necessary land and funds to build Pitt Stadium.

=== Jock Sutherland era (1924–1938) ===
A natural replacement for Pop Warner was Jock Sutherland, Warner's former All-American guard. Sutherland's second season kicked off the Panthers' first in the newly constructed Pitt Stadium and saw the team achieve an 8–1 record and win the 1925 Eastern Championship. The following year, the Panthers featured Gibby Welch, who led the nation in rushing in 1926 and helped Pitt to the Eastern Championship and its first bowl game, the Rose Bowl, in 1927. In 1929, Pitt went undefeated in the regular season, the first of four undefeated regular seasons under Sutherland, won the Eastern Championship, made its second appearance in the Rose Bowl and were named that season's national champion.

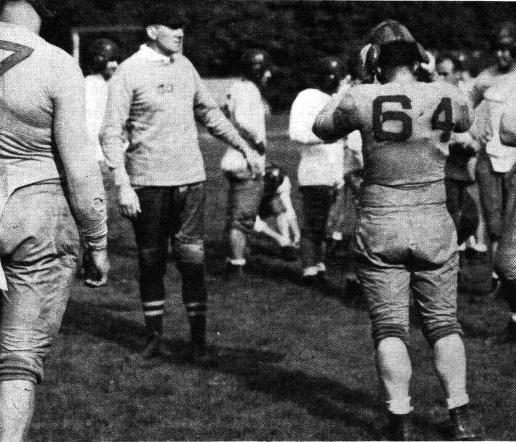
Jock Sutherland running a practice in 1935

Pitt's 1931 team finished 8–1 with six shutouts, including a 40–0 dismantling of Nebraska. That season also saw Pitt defeat Penn State in State College, using only one first-string player, by a score of 41–6 en route to winning the Eastern Championship. These accomplishments would prompt Parke Davis to again name the Panthers national champions. Pitt follow up the season with the 1932 Eastern Championship and their third Rose Bowl appearance. In 1934 Pitt won at Nebraska 25–6, shut out Notre Dame 19–0, its third victory in a row over the Irish, and defeated USC 20–6, which resulted in an Eastern Champion as well as being awarded a share of the national championship by Parke Davis.

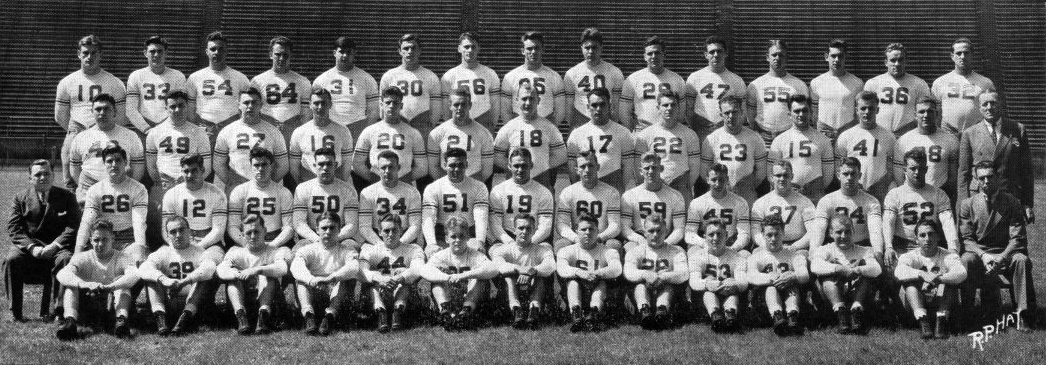
The 1937 undefeated national championship team

One of the greatest back-to-back stretches in Pitt football history occurred during the 1936 and 1937 seasons which featured Heisman Trophy candidate and Hall of Fame running back Marshall Goldberg. In 1936, Pitt shut out five of its opponents and finished the regular season winning the Lambert-Meadowlands Trophy as Eastern Champions and ranked third in the Associated Press Poll, the inaugural year of the poll, whose rankings were finalized before the bowl season. Pitt accepted a bid to the Rose Bowl where it defeated Washington 21–0 which led many selectors to name Pitt as the 1936 national champions. However, it was during this time that the seeds of a rift between Sutherland and the university's administration were being sown, partly initiated by the refusal of the university to supply pocket money for players during the Rose Bowl trip. Pitt followed up the Rose Bowl winning 1936 season with a 9–0–1 record in 1937 that included five shutouts, a repeat Eastern Champions, and a number one ranking in the AP's final poll. Due to the developing rift with the university administration, and the time and expense of the travel, Pitt became the first team to publicly decline a Rose Bowl invitation following a vote of the players. Despite its decision to sit out the postseason, the 1937 Pitt team was widely regarded as consensus national champions.

During this period, Pitt regularly dominated opposing teams, even inducing Notre Dame to drop Pitt from its schedule. However, in 1937 the university began introducing policies to de-emphasize its athletic programs, including the restriction of practices, discouragement of alumni involvement, and the elimination of recruiting and all subsidization of athletics. The implementation of these policies was the beginning of the end for that era of Pitt football prominence, but the Panthers still impressed during the 1938 season behind an assembly of talent at running back labeled the "Dream Backfield". Following the season, the split between the administration and Sutherland became complete, and Sutherland resigned resulting in booster and student outrage.

Sutherland, who was described as "a national hero" in a Saturday Evening Post article, was perhaps the most highly admired and influential coach in the history of the university. During his 15-year tenure at the university, the longest of any football coach at Pitt, he compiled a record of 111–20–12 which included 79 shutouts. Sutherland never lost to rival Penn State and lost only once to West Virginia, and his teams were named Eastern football champions seven times: 1925, 1927, 1929, 1931, 1934, 1936, and 1937. During this time, Pitt appeared in four Rose Bowl games (1928, 1930, 1933, and 1937) and turned down a bid for the 1938 Rose Bowl. Sutherland's teams were named "National Champions" by various selectors for nine different seasons including 1925, 1927, 1929, 1931, 1933, 1934, 1936, 1937, and 1938. Of these, the University of Pittsburgh officially recognizes five of those years as national championship seasons: 1929, 1931, 1934, 1936, and 1937.

=== 1940s through 1960s ===
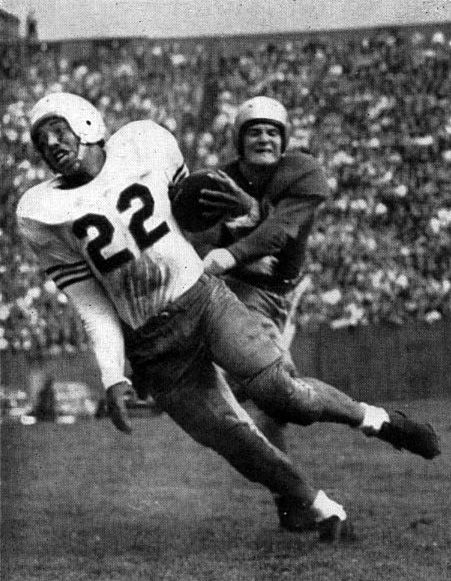
Jimmy Joe Robinson carrying the ball against Notre Dame in 1948

The policy of deemphasis resulted in a dramatic downturn for Pitt's football fortunes, including a succession of coaches with short stints.

In 1945, with new university chancellor Rufus Fitzgerald at the helm, athletic scholarships and recruiting were reinstated. However, substantial damage had already been done to the football program. During this era Pitt's first African-American player, Jimmy Joe Robinson, led the team in receiving and rushing, and also excelled at returning punts and kickoffs. Walter "Mike" Milligan brought Pitt back to winning records in 1948 and 1949, achieving consecutive 6–3 seasons that included appearances in the national rankings and back-to-back shutouts of Penn State.

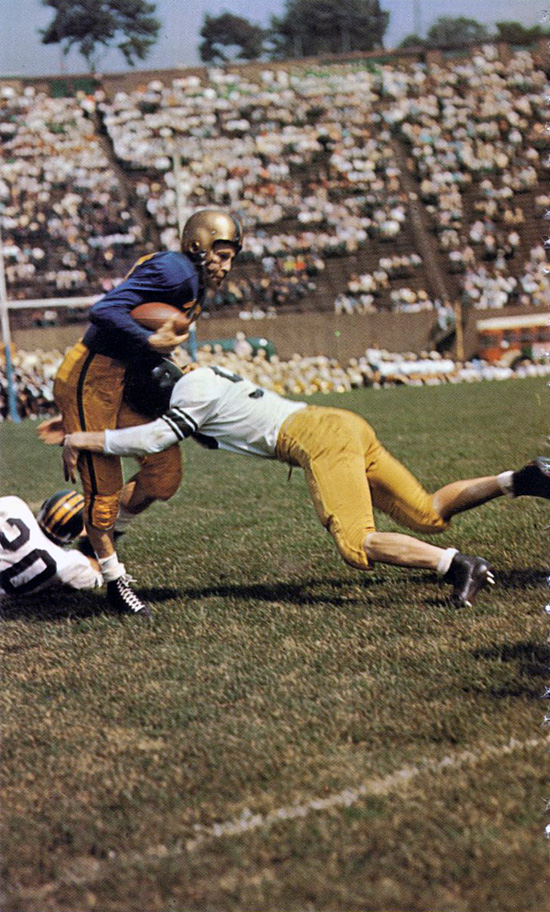
Pitt advancing the ball in a 27–7 win over Cal in a 1955 game at Pitt Stadium

In 1955 Pitt sought a return to the roots of its previous success by turning to John Michelosen, a quarterback on Jock Sutherland's 1936 and 1937 championship teams who later served as a Sutherland assistant and as the head coach of the Pittsburgh Steelers. Michelosen immediately brought Pitt football back to respectability in his first season with the 1955 Eastern Championship that was capped by an appearance in the 1956 Sugar Bowl. Pitt's invitation to the Sugar Bowl was surrounded by controversy because Pitt, an integrated team, was the first to bring an African-American, Bobby Grier, to play in a southeastern bowl game in the segregated Deep South. Grier's play in the Sugar Bowl cemented the university's place in civil rights history as the first team to break the color barrier for southeastern bowls.

Four additional winning seasons followed against formidable national schedules. The best team of the Micheloson era in 1963. The 1963 team, led by All-American Paul Martha, swept through a schedule with the only loss of the season was in late October at Navy, which would finish the season ranked second in the nation. The Panthers, at 7–1 and ranked fourth in the nation, headed into their rivalry against Penn State with a chance to play for a national championship. However, when President John F. Kennedy was assassinated, the game was postponed. The bowls, which feared inviting Pitt before their season finale against Penn State, signed other teams, leaving Pitt without a bowl invitation despite defeating the Nittany Lions, and ending the season with a 9–1 record. Perceived as perhaps the best team of the modern football era not to appear in a bowl, the 1963 team finished with its number three ranking intact, but infamously received the label of the "No Bowl Team".

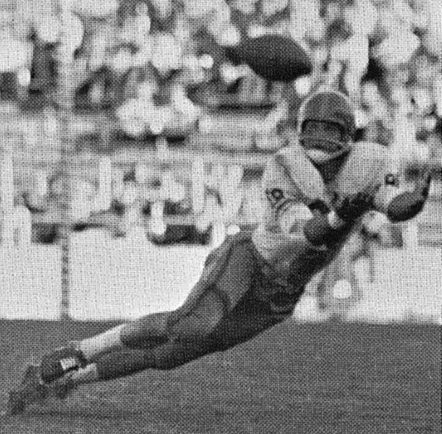
"Iron" Mike Ditka, shown here in 1960, was an All-American at left end and also played basketball and baseball

In eleven seasons at Pitt, the second longest coaching tenure at the school after Sutherland's, Michelosen achieved a 56–49–7 record with only 4 losing campaigns. Pitt finished ranked among the top twenty programs in four seasons with Michelosen at the helm. Michelosen was a major coaching influence on such modern day NFL coaching greats as Mike Ditka and Marty Schottenheimer, both of whom played at Pitt under Michelosen. However, a downturn in Pitt's football fortunes followed until the hiring of Johnny Majors.

=== Johnny Majors and Jackie Sherrill (1973–1981) ===
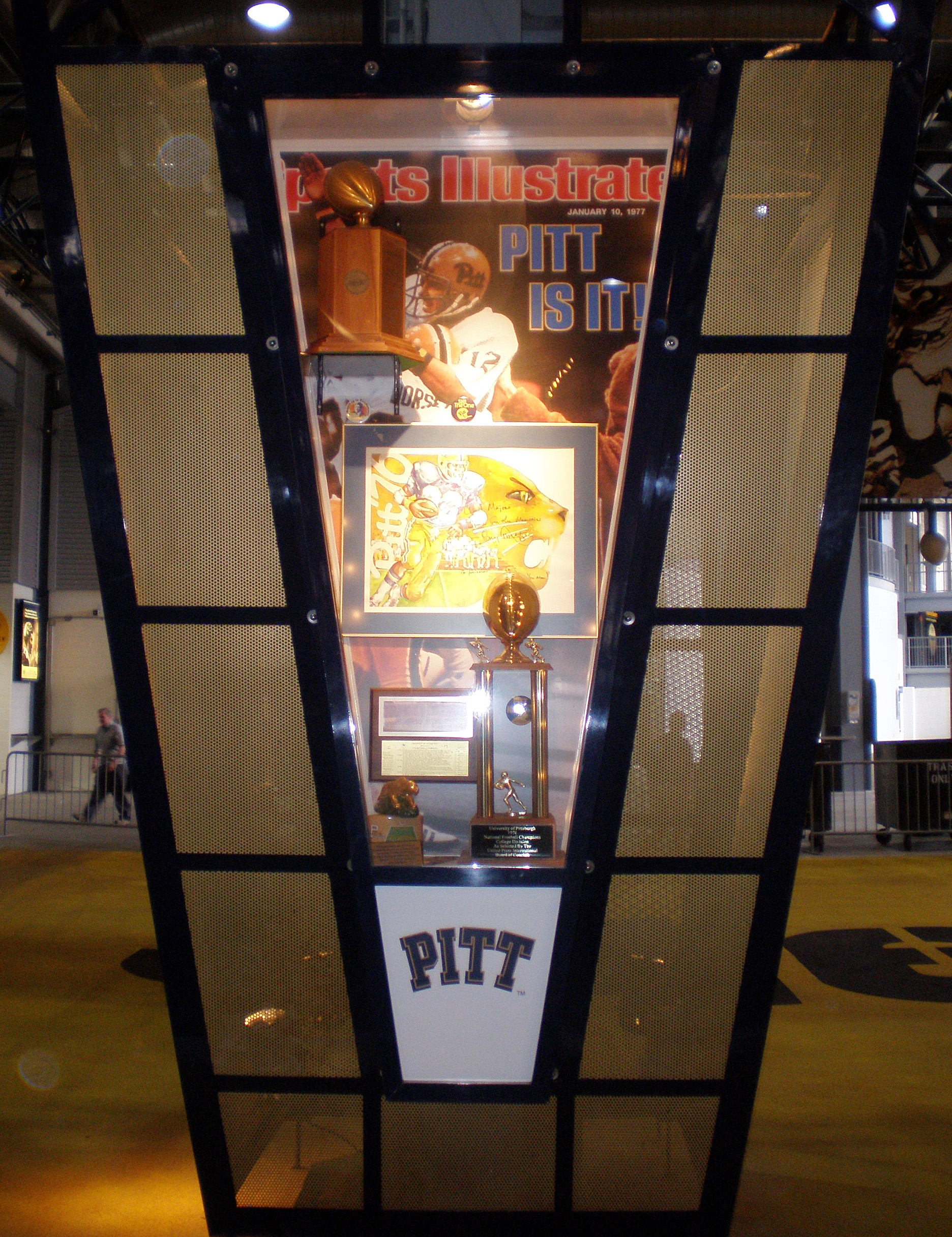
Heinz Field kiosk celebrating Pitt's 1976 National Championship

University Chancellor Wesley Posvar took action to revive the football program and hired Johnny Majors in 1973. Majors immediately upgraded the recruiting, most notably bringing in future Heisman Trophy winner Tony Dorsett. Majors' impact was immediate and the Panthers their first bowl bid since 1956 when they were invited to play Arizona State in the 1973 Fiesta Bowl. Improvements continued with each season setting the stage was thus set for the 1976 edition of the Panthers to make a run for the national championship. The Panthers finished the regular season 11–0, and in December, Dorsett became the first Pitt Panther to win the Heisman Trophy as the nation's best college football player. Dorsett also won the Maxwell Award, the Walter Camp Player of the Year Award, and was named UPI Player of the Year. Pitt accepted an invitation to the 1977 Sugar Bowl to face fourth ranked Georgia and defeated the Bulldogs 27–3 and was voted number one in both the final Associated Press and Coaches polls, claiming their ninth national championship. This was Pitt's first undefeated national championship since 1937. The American Football Coaches Association (AFCA) named Majors the 1976 Coach of the Year. Following this historic season, Majors returned to his alma mater, the University of Tennessee, to take the head coaching job.

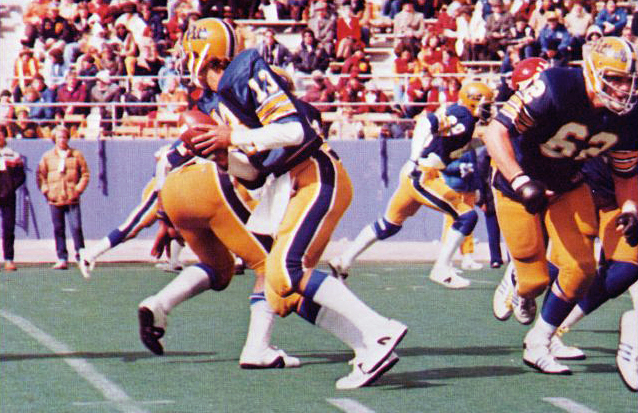
Dan Marino quarterbacks Pitt in a 1979 rout of Cincinnati in what would be the first of three straight 11–1 seasons

Jackie Sherrill, who had been an assistant under Majors, succeeded Majors as head coach at Pitt. Under Sherrill, the winning continued with a 9–2–1 record and Gator Bowl win in 1977 and an 8–4 record in 1978. Sherrill stockpiled future NFL talent including Pittsburgh's own quarterback Dan Marino, Hall of Fame inductee Russ Grimm, and Outland Trophy winner Mark May. Sherrill also molded a devastating defense that was anchored at the defensive end position manned by Hall of Fame inductee Rickey Jackson and Heisman Trophy runner-up Hugh Green, who had the highest finish in the Heisman voting by a defensive player until 1997. 1979 began a string of three straight seasons with 11–1 records. However, an early loss at North Carolina in 1979, a midseason loss during a driving rainstorm at Florida State in 1980, and a devastating season-ending defeat at the hands of rival Penn State in 1981 prevented those teams from clinching an AP or Coaches poll national championship. In each of these three seasons, Pitt rebounded to win a bowl game: the Fiesta, Gator, and Sugar Bowls respectively. Sherrill's teams at Pitt are considered by some to be among the most talented in Pitt and college football history. The 1980 Pitt team alone featured seven first round draft picks, 23 players who went on to start in the NFL, seven others who played in the NFL, and one player each who played in the CFL and the USFL. In five seasons, Sherrill's Panthers won 50 games, lost nine, and tied one (50–9–1), which places his 0.842 winning percentage at the top of the list for all Pitt coaches, just ahead of Jock Sutherland.

=== 1982 to present ===
Foge Fazio succeeded Sherrill. Pitt continued success in the second half of the 1980s under head coach Mike Gottfried, and in 1991, joined the new Big East Football Conference, thus ending its history as a football independent, however coaching changes led to its football fortunes turning for the worse. In 1993, the university again looked to its past and brought back Johnny Majors. However, recruiting had fallen off significantly, and the quality of Pitt's football facilities had fallen behind those of its competition. Walt Harris replaced Majors in 1997 and took Pitt to the 1997 Liberty Bowl in his first season. At the same time, the university administration began addressing the facility situation starting with the opening of a football practice facility, the UPMC Sports Performance Complex. In lieu of much-needed but cost-prohibitive renovations to modernize Pitt Stadium, the administration made a controversial decision to move home games to the newly proposed North Shore stadium, later named Acrisure Stadium, and to demolish Pitt Stadium. 1999 was the final season for the Panthers in Pitt Stadium, which had served Pitt for 75 seasons.

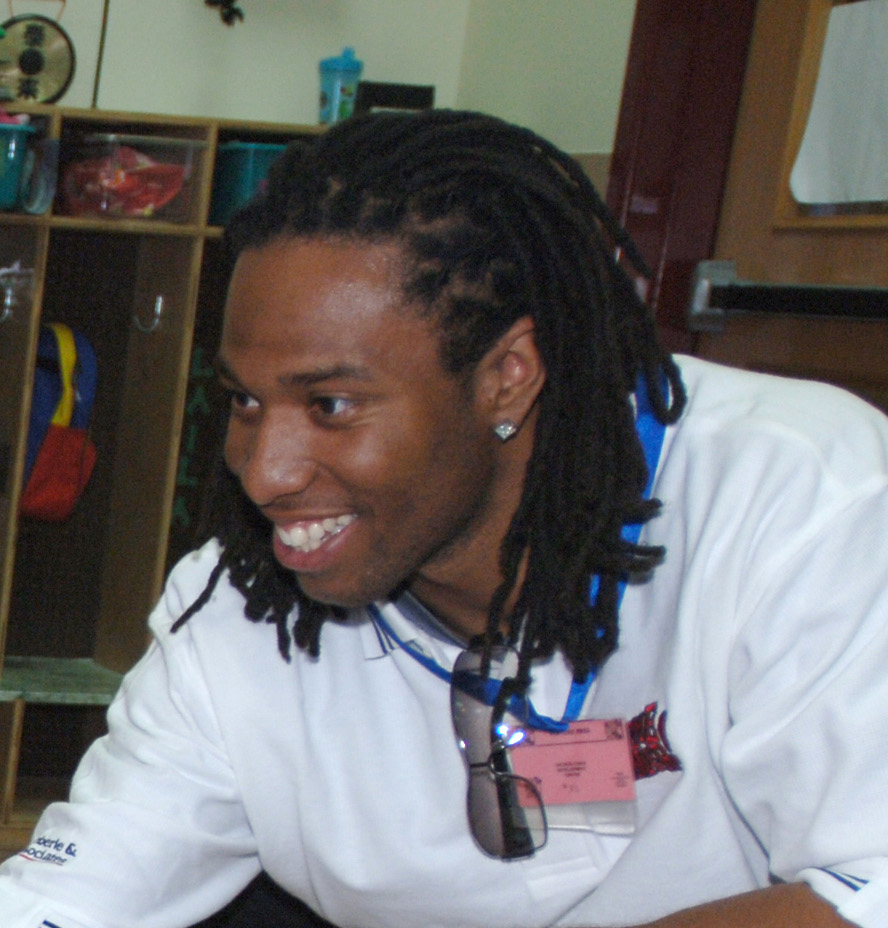
Larry Fitzgerald won the Biletnikoff and Walter Camp awards, was the Heisman Trophy runner-up, and was featured on the cover of EA Sports NCAA Football 2005 following his 2003 season with Pitt.

Behind an increasing number of talented players, led by Biletnikoff Award winner Antonio Bryant, Pitt including a 12–0 defeat of rival Penn State. Additional bowl games and national rankings followed over the next four seasons. Overall Harris led the Panthers to a bowl game in six of his eight seasons, including five consecutive bowl games from 2000 through 2004, with bowl victories in 2001 and, led by Biletnikoff and Walter Camp Award winner Larry Fitzgerald, in 2002. Harris also led Pittsburgh to a share of the Big East Conference championship and a Bowl Championship Series (BCS) Fiesta Bowl bid in 2004. Harris was named the Big East Conference Coach of the Year in 1997 and 2004, and he was the AFCA Region I Coach of the Year in 2002. Over his eight years at Pitt, from 1997 to 2004, Harris compiled an overall record of 52–44.

Dave Wannstedt, a Pittsburgh area native and former Pitt player, succeeded Harris as Pitt's head coach on December 23, 2004. Known for his recruiting prowess, Wannstedt reeled in classes that were nationally ranked throughout his tenure at Pitt. The last game of the 2007 season marked a major turning point for Wannstedt's program when Pitt traveled to four touchdown favorite and number two ranked West Virginia, who only needed a win over archrival Pitt to earn a spot in the BCS National Championship Game. One of the most memorable games in both schools' histories, Pitt upset the Mountaineers 13–9 and thus prevented them from playing for the national championship.

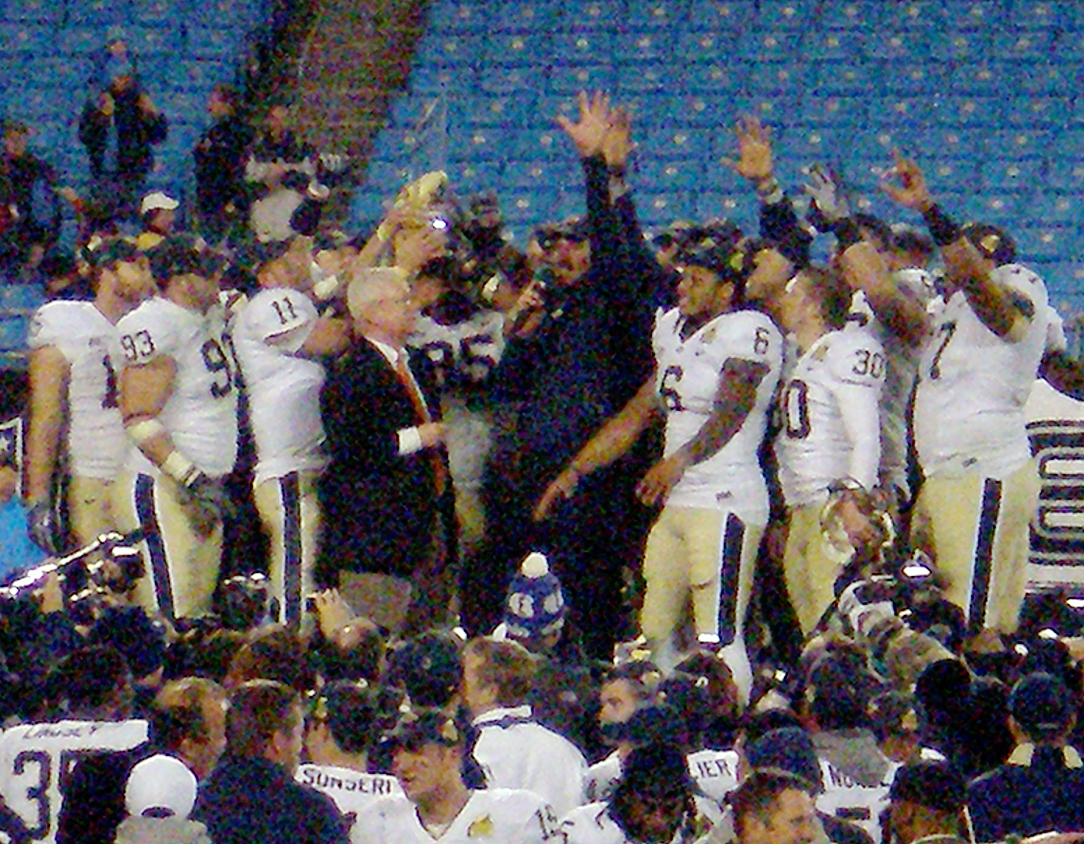
Dave Wannstedt addresses the crowd during the trophy presentation following the 2009 Meineke Car Care Bowl, in which Pitt defeated North Carolina 19–17

The following season, Pitt finished with a 9–3 record, and in 2009, Pitt shot off to a 9–1 start, its best start since 1982, and had climbed to ninth in the AP and BCS polls before close losses in its final two games. The Panthers rebounded by winning the Meineke Car Care Bowl and finished ranked 15th and achieve its first ten-win season since 1981. In addition, Pitt players garnered many post-season accolades, including Big East Offensive Player and Rookie of the Year in Dion Lewis, and Big East Co-Defensive Players of the Year in Mick Williams and Greg Romeus. Following Wannstedt's coaching tenure, a succession of coaches led to Pitt hiring Pat Narduzzi in December 2014, and led Pitt back to the AP top 25 by the 2015 season for the first time since 2010. Narduzzi coached several high profile players at Pitt, including Lombardi and Outland trophy winner Aaron Donald and ACC Player of the Year James Conner. In 2021, Narduzzi led Pitt to a 10–2 regular season, an ACC championship, and a Peach Bowl appearance. The following year was followed up with another top 25 finish and a victory over UCLA in the Sun Bowl.

The Panthers struggled in their 2023 campaign, turning in a 2–6 ACC conference record and 3–9 overall result. Pittsburgh's only victories were its season opener against Wofford 45–7 on September 2, 2023, Louisville 38–21 on October 14, 2023, and Boston College 24–16 on November 16, 2023.

On July 7th, 2024, Pitt announced the team will wear a commemorative helmet sticker throughout the 2024 season to honor Bobby Grier.

The Panthers fared better in 2024, finishing the season with a 3–5 ACC standing and a 7–6 overall record. Pittsburgh then faced Toledo in the 2024 GameAbove Sports Bowl on December 26, 2024, losing 48–46 in 6 overtimes, the most overtimes in BCS history and the second most of the 2024 season.

== National championships ==
=== Pitt-claimed ===
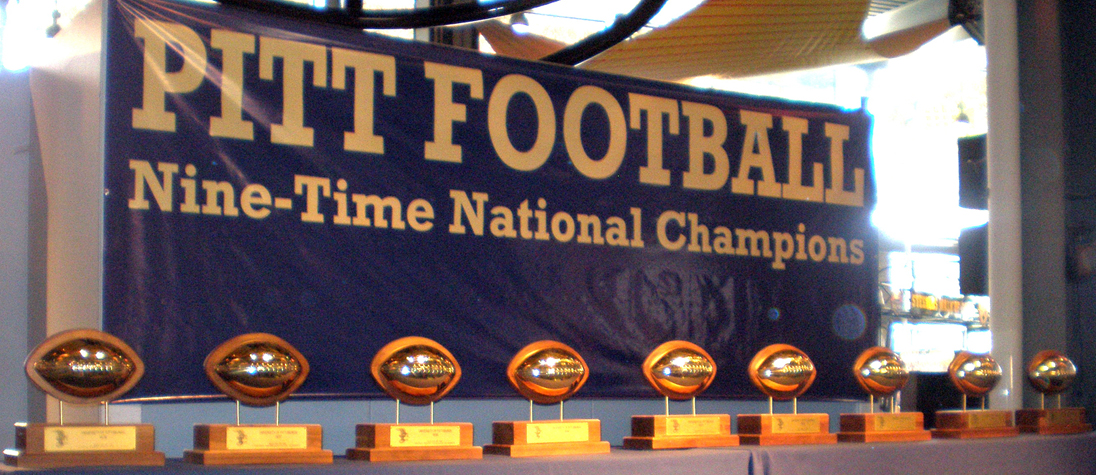
Some of Pitt's national championship trophies

The University of Pittsburgh claims 9 national championships in football. Eight of these claims (1915, 1916, 1918, 1929, 1931, 1936, 1937, and 1976) are taken from the total of 11 seasons in which the Panthers have been selected as a national champion by a "major selector" as determined by the Official NCAA Records Book. In addition, Pitt also claims a national championship for the 1934 season. (Note: According to Dan Jenkins in Sports Illustrated, Pitt was selected as a national champion in 1934 by Parke Davis, or someone using his byline. Davis is deemed as a "major selector" of national champions only through 1933, according to the Official NCAA Records Book, and made all of his selections in 1933 just prior to his death. However, a championship selection for 1934, attributed to Davis by Sports Illustrated, is not included in the Official NCAA Records Book, and thus Pitt is listed in the NCAA Records Book as having been named a national champion by a "major selector" in only 11, and not 12, seasons.) The university bases its claim for the five national championships from 1929 to 1937 on a 1967 article by Dan Jenkins of Sports Illustrated.

The nine national championships claimed by Pitt are presented in its annual football media guide: All selections for seasons before 1934 were made retrospectively (selected years or decades later).

Year	Coach	Selector(s)	Record	Final AP	Final Coaches
1915	Pop Warner	Parke Davis	8–0	–	–
1916	Pop Warner	Billingsley Report, Helms Athletic Foundation, The Football Thesaurus (Houlgate System), National Championship Foundation, Parke Davis	8–0	–	–
1918	Pop Warner	Helms Athletic Foundation, The Football Thesaurus (Houlgate System), National Championship Foundation	4–1	–	–
1929	Jock Sutherland	Parke Davis	9–1	–	–
1931	Jock Sutherland	Parke Davis	8–1	–	–
1934	Jock Sutherland	Parke Davis' successor (Note: Davis died June 5, 1934. The 1934 selection is not documented in the official NCAA football records book. After Davis' death, Walter R. Okeson became the editor of the annual Spalding's Official Foot Ball Guide, which Davis had previously edited. In the Guide, Davis had compiled a list titled, "Outstanding Nationwide and Sectional Teams", for the seasons from 1869 onward. For several years, Okeson continued to add annual selections to this list, described as "Originally Compiled by the late Parke H. Davis." The 1935 Guide stated, in Okeson's review of the 1934 season, "Minnesota — Undefeated and untied, team was generally conceded to be national leader," and "Pittsburgh — Defeated only by Minnesota, team was generally rated as strongest in East." Okeson listed both schools as "Outstanding Nationwide Teams" for 1934. All 13 major selectors and 26 others chose Minnesota and Alabama.)	8–1	–	–
1936	Jock Sutherland	College Football Researchers Association, The Football Thesaurus (Houlgate System), Illustrated Football Annual (Boand System)	8–1–1	–	–
1937	Jock Sutherland	AP, Berryman QPRS, Billingsley Report, College Football Researchers Association, Dickinson System, Litkenhous, National Championship Foundation, Poling System, Sagarin Ratings, Williamson System, Illustrated Football Annual (Boand System), The Football Thesaurus (Houlgate System)	9–0–1	No. 1	–
1976	Johnny Majors	AP, UPI, NFF, FWAA	12–0	No. 1	No. 1

For seasons shown above other than the two in which Pitt was selected by a major poll as national champion, these persons created math rating systems that selected Pitt:

Richard Billingsley 1916
William Boand 1936
Deke Houlgate, Sr. 1916, 1918, 1936

Other selectors shown above for seasons before major polls began:

own selections:
Bill Schroeder 1916, 1918
Parke Davis 1915, 1916, 1929, 1931, 1934 (posthumous)
member polling:
National Championship Foundation 1916, 1918

=== NCAA records book ===
see also: Year-by-year list of "Major" National Championship Selections

According to the Official NCAA Division 1 Football Records Book, Pitt has been named a national champion by a "Major Selector" in 11 separate seasons. The seasons listed in the NCAA Records Book include:

1910 • 1915 • 1916 • 1918 • 1929 • 1931 • 1936 • 1937 • 1976 • 1980 • 1981

All major selectors that chose Pitt in 1910, 1915, 1931, and 1981 also selected co-champions.

=== CFBDW ===
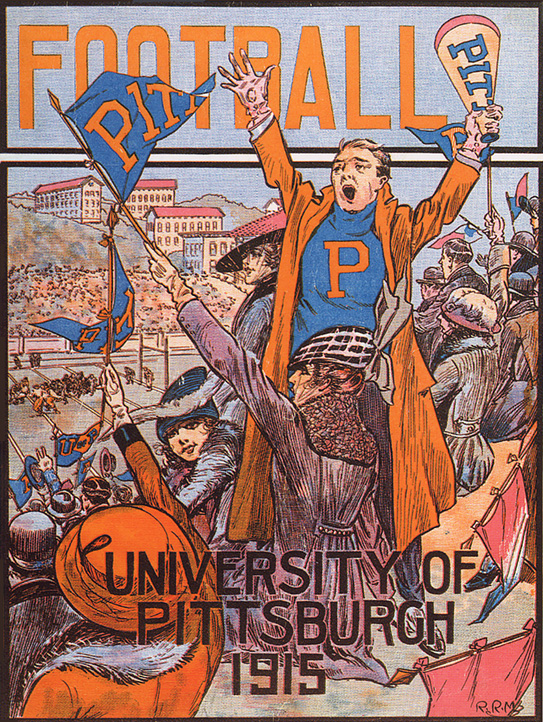
Cover art of a game program from the 1915 national championship season under head coach Pop Warner

College Football Data Warehouse lists nine recognized national championship seasons in which the University of Pittsburgh was named a national champion. CFBDW lists the Joe Thompson coached 1910 undefeated and unscored upon team as a recognized national champion, whereas the university does not claim this championship. However, CFBDW does not list the 1934 season, claimed by Pitt, as a recognized championship season. The following nine seasons are the years Pitt is listed as a recognized national champion in College Football Data Warehouse:

1910 • 1915 • 1916 • 1918 • 1929 • 1931 • 1936 • 1937 • 1976

According to research conducted by College Football Data Warehouse, in seven additional seasons to the ones listed above, at least one selector (some not "major") of national championships has declared Pitt as its national champion, for a total of 16 selections. In four of these seasons, there was a single selector of Pitt (1925, 1929, 1933, 1938). In 1937 and 1976 there were 27 and 31 such selectors, respectively. The 16 seasons that Pitt was selected as a national champion by at least one selector according to CFBDW research include: 1910 • 1915 • 1916 • 1917 • 1918 • 1925 • 1927 • 1929 • 1931 • 1933 • 1936 • 1937 • 1938 • 1976 • 1980 • 1981

=== National Poll-era (1936–present) ===
Since the advent of the AP Poll in 1936, Pitt has been selected as its National Champion twice, in 1937 and 1976. Until the 1968 college football season, the final AP poll of the season was released following the end of the regular season, with the exception of the 1965 season, and did not consider the results of bowl games. The other major national poll, the Coaches' Poll, began in 1950 and has selected Pitt as its National Champion once, in 1976.

=== Summary ===
The following table summarizes the source and totals for Pitt's national championship seasons.

Source	Championships	Years
AP / Coaches' Poll (1936–present)	Two	1937, 1976
Sports Illustrated (1967 article) (Note: Based on a September 11, 1967 Sports Illustrated article.)	Five	1929, 1931, 1934, 1936, 1937
CFBDW (recognized)	Nine	1910, 1915, 1916, 1918, 1929, 1931, 1936, 1937, 1976
NCAA ("major" selectors) (Note: National Championships as listed in the Official NCAA Football Records Book as selected by "Major Selectors". The NCAA itself does not recognize or discriminate between national championship selections.)	Eleven	1910, 1915, 1916, 1918, 1929, 1931, 1936, 1937, 1976, 1980, 1981
CFBDW (all)	Sixteen	1910, 1915, 1916, 1917, 1918, 1925, 1927, 1929, 1931, 1933, 1936, 1937, 1938, 1976, 1980, 1981
Total unique seasons (Note: The total of 17 national championship season selections is arrived at by combining the 16 seasons listed by College Football Data Warehouse plus the 1934 selection listed by Sports Illustrated as being by Parke Davis.)	Seventeen	1910, 1915, 1916, 1917, 1918, 1925, 1927, 1929, 1931, 1933, 1934, 1936, 1937, 1938, 1976, 1980, 1981
Claimed by Pitt (Note: The University of Pittsburgh officially claims 9 national championships for the Panthers football team. The University of Pittsburgh bases its claim for the five 1929–1937 national championships on a 1967 Sports Illustrated article. The only selector attributed for three of the five was Parke Davis. These championships, together with its consensus championship of 1976, are the basis for six of the university's claim of 9 national championship seasons.)	Nine	1915, 1916, 1918, 1929, 1931, 1934, 1936, 1937, 1976

== Conference affiliations ==
- Independent (1890–1990)
- Big East Conference (1991–2012)
- Atlantic Coast Conference (2013–present)

=== Conference championships ===
Pittsburgh has won three conference championships, one outright and two shared.

Year	Coach	Conference	Overall Record	Conference Record	Bowl	Opponent	Result
2004†	Walt Harris	Big East Conference	8–4	4–2	Fiesta Bowl	Utah	L 7–35
2010†	Dave Wannstedt	Big East Conference	8–5	5–2	BBVA Compass Bowl	Kentucky	W 27–10
2021	Pat Narduzzi	Atlantic Coast Conference	11–2	7–1	Peach Bowl	Michigan State	L 21–31

† Co-champions

=== Division championships ===
Pittsburgh has won two division championships.

Year	Division	Coach	Overall Record	Conference Record	Opponent	CG result
2018	ACC Coastal	Pat Narduzzi	7–7	6–2	Clemson	L 10–42
2021	ACC Coastal	Pat Narduzzi	11–2	7–1	Wake Forest	W 45–21

== Bowl games ==
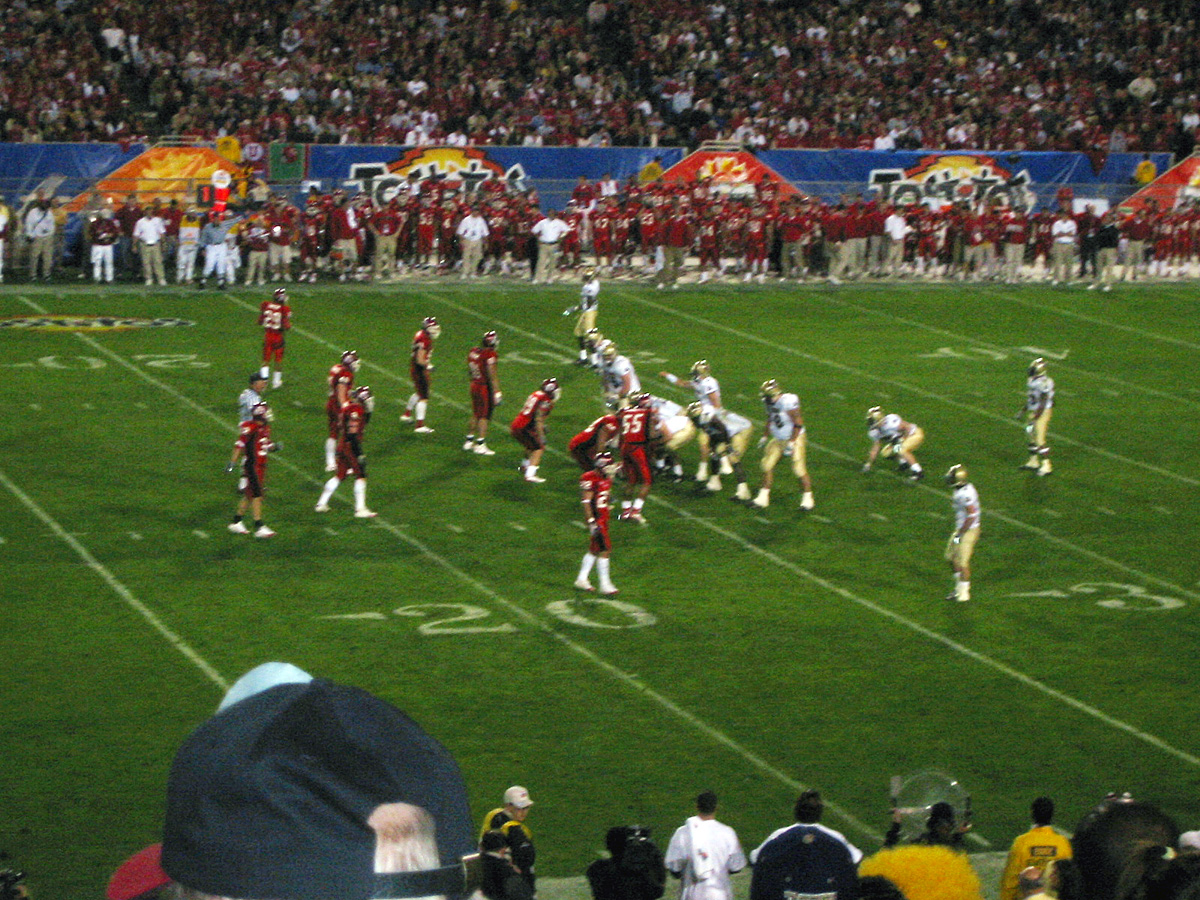
2005 Fiesta Bowl

Pitt has been to 39 bowl games throughout its history, winning 15 and losing 24.

Season	Bowl	Opponent	Result
1927	Rose Bowl	Stanford	L 6–7
1929	Rose Bowl	Southern California	L 14–47
1932	Rose Bowl	Southern California	L 0–35
1936	Rose Bowl	Washington	W 21–0
1955	Sugar Bowl	Georgia Tech	L 0–7
1956	Gator Bowl	Georgia Tech	L 14–21
1973	Fiesta Bowl	Arizona State	L 7–28
1975	Sun Bowl	Kansas	W 33–19
1976	Sugar Bowl	Georgia	W 27–3
1977	Gator Bowl	Clemson	W 34–3
1978	Tangerine Bowl	NC State	L 17–30
1979	Fiesta Bowl	Arizona	W 16–10
1980	Gator Bowl	South Carolina	W 37–9
1981	Sugar Bowl	Georgia	W 24–20
1982	Cotton Bowl Classic	Southern Methodist	L 3–7
1983	Fiesta Bowl	Ohio State	L 23–28
1987	Astro-Bluebonnet Bowl	Texas	L 27–32
1989	John Hancock Bowl	Texas A&M	W 31–28
1997	Liberty Bowl	Southern Miss	L 7–41
2000	Insight.com Bowl	Iowa State	L 29–37
2001	Tangerine Bowl	NC State	W 34–19
2002	Insight Bowl	Oregon State	W 38–13
2003	Continental Tire Bowl	Virginia	L 16–23
2004	Fiesta Bowl	Utah	L 7–35
2008	Sun Bowl	Oregon State	L 0–3
2009	Meineke Car Care Bowl	North Carolina	W 19–17
2010	BBVA Compass Bowl	Kentucky	W 27–10
2011	BBVA Compass Bowl	Southern Methodist	L 6–28
2012	BBVA Compass Bowl	Ole Miss	L 17–38
2013	Little Caesars Pizza Bowl	Bowling Green	W 30–27
2014	Armed Forces Bowl	Houston	L 34–35
2015	Military Bowl	Navy	L 28–44
2016	Pinstripe Bowl	Northwestern	L 24–31
2018	Sun Bowl	Stanford	L 13–14
2019	Quick Lane Bowl	Eastern Michigan	W 34–30
2021	Peach Bowl	Michigan State	L 21–31
2022	Sun Bowl	UCLA	W 37–35
2024	GameAbove Sports Bowl	Toledo	L 46–48^{6OT}
2025	Military Bowl	East Carolina	L 17–23
2026	TBD	TBD	TBD

== Facilities ==
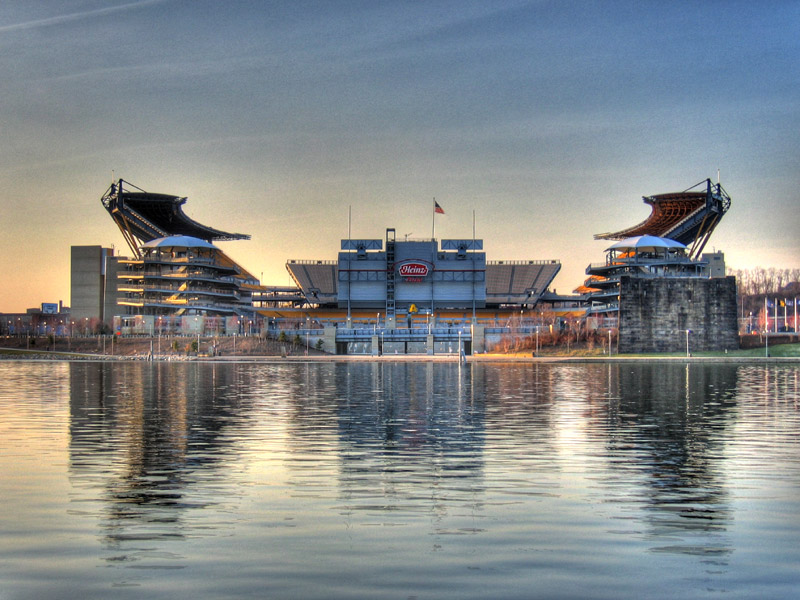
Acrisure Stadium (formerly Heinz Field), home of the Pitt Panthers

The team first played at Recreation Park. Beginning in 1900, the Panthers played their games at Exposition Park on the North Shore of Pittsburgh, sharing the stadium with the Pittsburgh Pirates.

In 1909 the Panthers, along with the Pirates, moved to Forbes Field, located on campus, where they played until 1924. In 1925, Pitt Stadium was completed on the opposite end of the campus, giving the Panthers their only private stadium. Pitt Stadium was home for the Panthers although the Steelers also used it for home games in the mid-1960s. Following the demolition of Pitt Stadium in 1999, the Panthers moved to Three Rivers Stadium, again on the North Shore, where the Pirates and Steelers had played since 1970. A handful of nationally televised Pitt Panther football games from the late 1970s to 1999 were played as home games not at Pitt Stadium but at Three Rivers with its more modern facilities.

Acrisure Stadium (formerly Heinz Field) opened in 2001, where the Panthers play as a co-tenant with the Pittsburgh Steelers. The Panthers' practice facility is the University of Pittsburgh Medical Center Sports Performance Complex which is also shared with the Steelers.

== Firsts ==
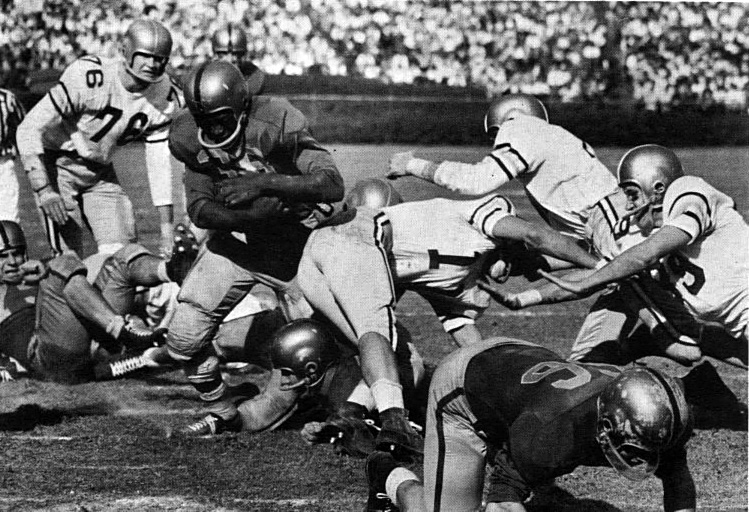
Bobby Grier in the 1956 Sugar Bowl

Pitt football has been involved in several notable first-time occurrences in the history of college football, including:

- First known use of numbers on the uniforms of football players was instituted by Pitt in 1908 during the coaching tenure of John A. Moorhead. The Official NCAA Records Book credits Washington & Jefferson as being the first documented college football team to use uniform numbers in 1908.
- First live radio broadcast of a college football game in the United States when Harold W. Arlin announced the 21–13 Pitt victory in the Backyard Brawl over West Virginia at Forbes Field in Pittsburgh on KDKA on October 8, 1921.
- First nationwide television broadcast of a live sporting event, a football game against Duke at Pitt Stadium, was televised coast-to-coast by NBC on September 29, 1951.
- First college football player, Tony Dorsett, at any level to rush for over 6,000 yards in a career.
- First defensive player, Hugh Green, to win the Walter Camp Award (1980).
- First live regular-season broadcast by ESPN of a college football game when eventual national champion BYU defeated Pitt, 20–14, at Pitt Stadium on September 1, 1984.
- First sophomore, Larry Fitzgerald, to win the Walter Camp Award (2003).

== Traditions ==
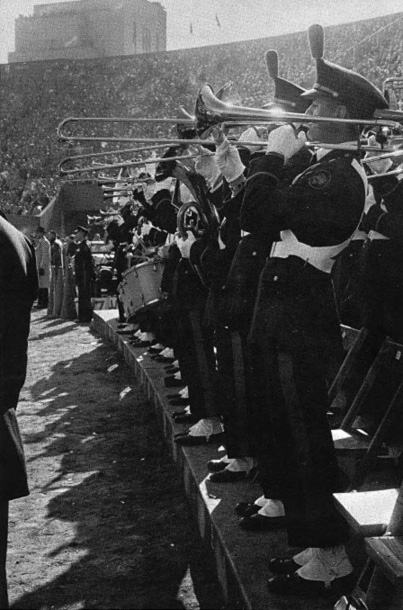
The Pitt Band plays the "Victory Song" at the end of a 26–13 win over Notre Dame at Pitt Stadium during the 1956 Pitt football season

The Panther (Puma concolor) was adopted by the university as its official athletic mascot by a group of students and alumni in 1909. The suggestion to adopt the Panther as mascot was made by George M. P. Baird, Class of 1909. Over 20 representations of panthers can be found in and around the university's campus and athletic facilities, including outside Acrisure Stadium. Students, alumni, and fans rub the nose of one Panther statue in particular, the Millennium Panther located outside the William Pitt Union, in order to bring good luck to the football team prior to games. This tradition was featured in a national television advertisement for the 2012 Hyundai Tucson automobile. In addition, a costumed mascot, named "Roc", performs with the Pitt Cheerleaders at various athletic and non-athletic university events.

Among the oldest traditions is the Official University Yell, dating to 1890, that has survived as lyrics within the fight song "Hail to Pitt". This song, along with the Pitt Victory Song, and The Panther Song, are the most common of Pitt fight songs performed on game days by the Pitt Band. The Pitt Band also participates in the "Panthers Prowl" which begins two hours before kickoff and allows fans to meet the team as they make their way into Acrisure Stadium outside Gate A. Originally, this tradition began as players made their way into Pitt Stadium. One hour prior to kick off, the Pitt Band also engages in the "March to Victory" from Tony Dorsett Drive down General Robinson Street and ending at the stage on Art Rooney Avenue. This tradition dates back to before the move to Acrisure Stadium when the Pitt Band would march throughout the streets of Oakland campus before arriving at Pitt Stadium. In addition, at halftime, the band typically will play in at least one formation spelling out "PITT". Other football traditions include:

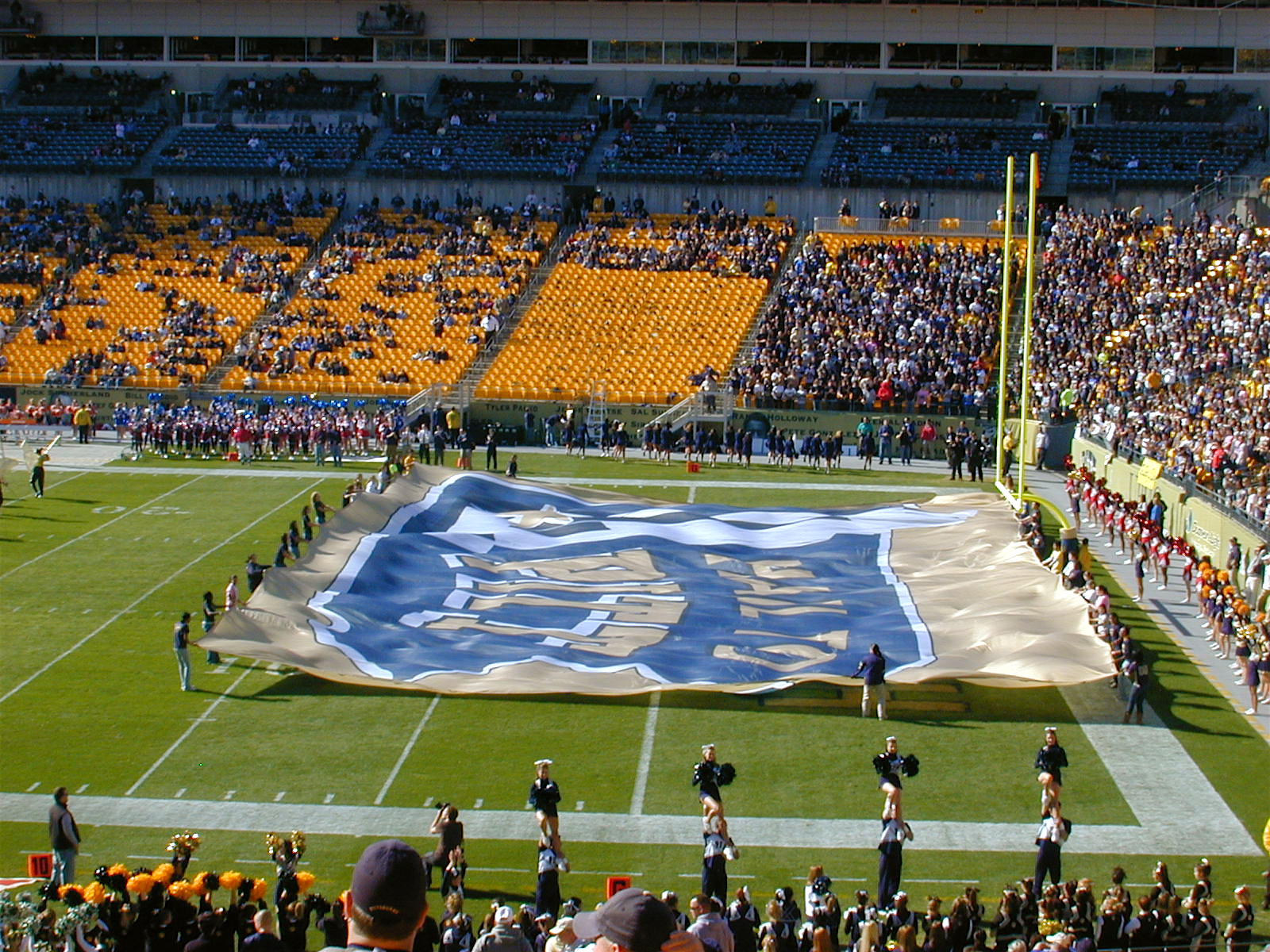
Hail to Pitt Flag on display during pre-game ceremonies

- A giant inflatable football helmet is set up on the lawn of the William Pitt Union during the week prior to football home games. Typically, information or other freebees are distributed around the helmet prior to the day of the game.
- Following touchdowns, the horns of the Gateway Clipper riverboat fleet, which cruises just outside Acrisure Stadium, sound.
- When the Pitt offense moves into the 20-yard line, two large, motorized Heinz ketchup bottles flanking either side of the scoreboard tilt over and beginning to pour out their electronic contents onto the JumboTron's screen signifying the team's move into the "red zone".

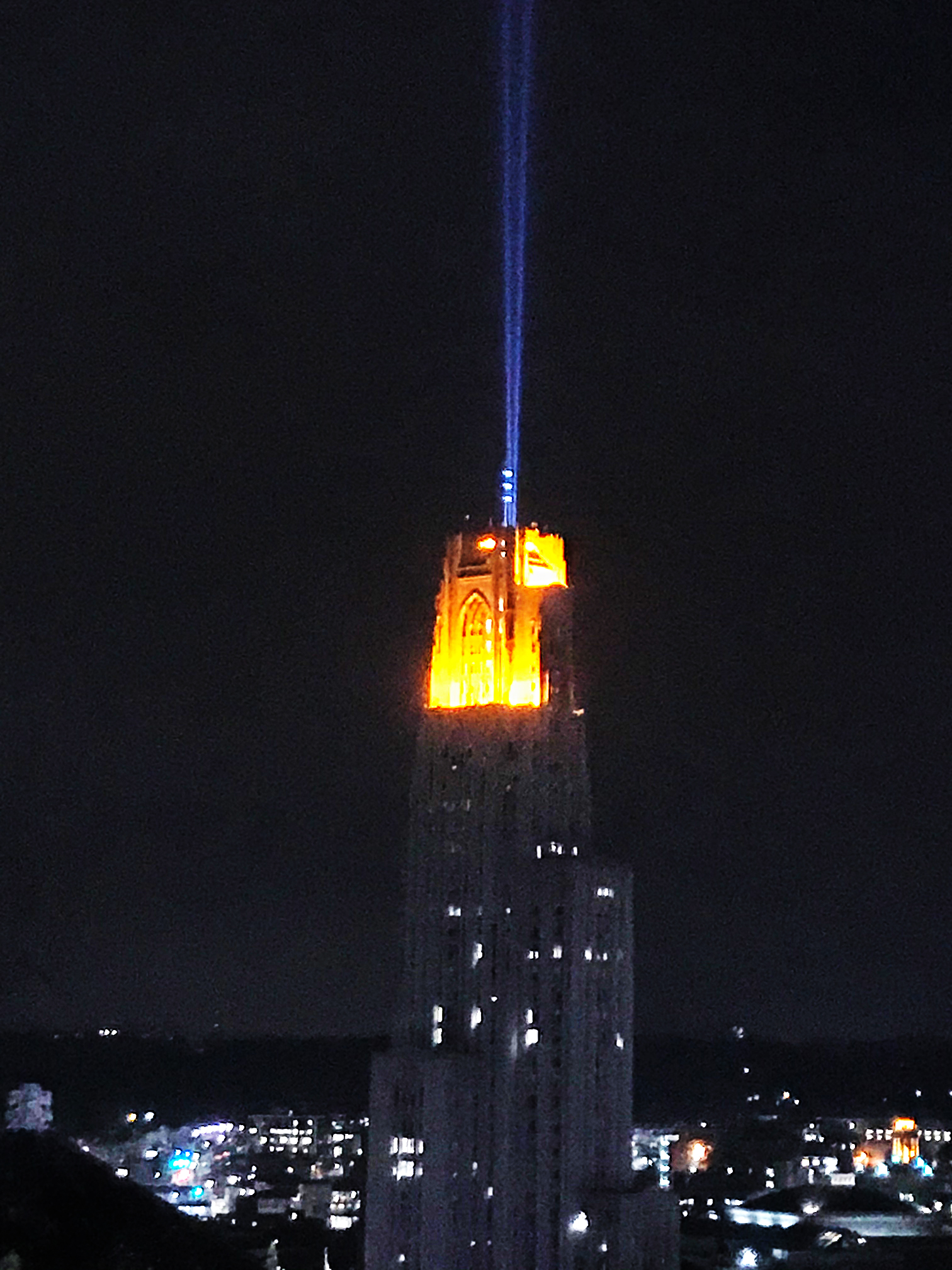
Victory Lights bask the top of the Cathedral of Learning in gold following football victories

- The upper section of the Cathedral of Learning has been illuminated gold with "victory lights" after a football team victory since 1983. In February 2018, a blue beam was added atop the Cathedral to accompany the gold lights.
- During home games, the jumbotron leads the crowd in a "Let's Go Pitt!" version of "Sweet Caroline", originally played between the 3rd and 4th quarter, but more recently at random times during games. During away games the Pitt Band will lead the visitor Pitt fans in a rendition of the song.
- Following home wins, the team gathers in front of the Pitt student section to celebrate with fans and the Pitt Band. After road wins, the team also congregates near the Pitt visiting section to celebrate.

=== Student section ===
During the late 1990s, athletic director Steve Pederson instituted a rebranding of the Pitt Stadium student section in an attempt to bolster enthusiasm and unity by emphasizing the 12th man concept. The stadium was repainted with the student section changed to section "12" and a large inflatable jersey bearing number 12 was placed near the section. Upon the move to Acrisure Stadium, the athletic department, in collaboration with their sideline apparel outfitter at the time Aéropostale, created the Aero-Zone. The Aero-Zone served as an exclusive on-field seating section for Pitt students where the first 200 students who lined up for the section before the game with student were admitted if they possessed tickets and proper identification. The Aero-Zone failed to catch sustained interest and was eventually discontinued. Other groups also attempted to create a more unified student section for football.

The current official Pitt football student fan club and cheering section, the Panther Pitt, was founded in 2003 by Pitt students Robin Frank and Julie Brennan to attempt to organize an Oakland Zoo-like atmosphere at Acrisure Stadium for football games. The Panther Pitt helped in coordinating student ticking policies with the athletic department and the Oakland Zoo. In 2006, the Panther Pitt and the Pitt Student Government Board originated the concept of "Code Blue" in which students wear blue T-shirts to the game to match the home blue uniforms of the Pitt football team. During some seasons, these shirts were commonly worn by students attending football games with the back of "Code-Blue" T-shirts typically include the line "Alle-genee-genac-genac" from the Official University Yell. In 2013, ESPN recognized the Panther Pitt as one of the nation's best college football student sections.

== Rivalries ==
=== West Virginia ===
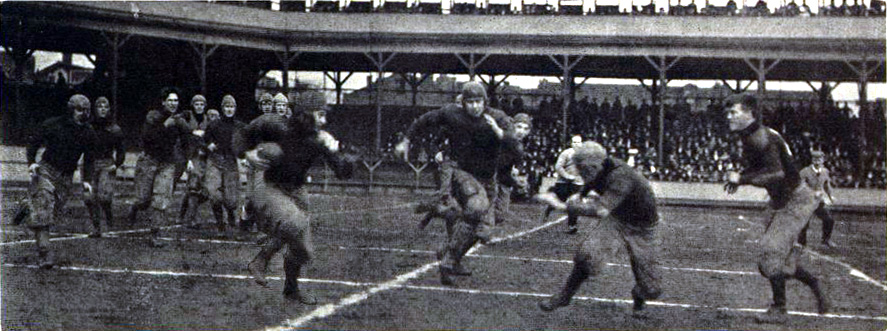
Pitt beat West Virginia 11–0 in this November 11, 1908 game at Exposition Park

One of Pitt's fiercest rivals has been with the West Virginia Mountaineers. Dubbed the Backyard Brawl, the rivalry was first played in 1895 and is one of the oldest and most played in college football. Of historic note, the 1921 Backyard Brawl was the first live radio broadcast of a college football game in the United States. On November 10, 1979, the Backyard Brawl was the last college football game played at old Mountaineer Field in Morgantown, West Virginia, with the Panthers prevailing 24–17. Through the 2011 season, Pitt and West Virginia have met on the gridiron a total of 104 times with Pitt holding a 61–41–3 edge in the series. In September 2015, it was announced the series would renew for the 2022–2025 seasons. Each team won their two home games during the series.

=== Penn State ===
For most of Pitt's football history its chief rival had been in-state foe Penn State. The first Pitt-Penn State game was played in 1893. The game has been played 99 times, with Penn State holding a 52–43–4 edge in the series. After a 16-year hiatus the rivalry was renewed following Joe Paterno's death in 2012 and resumed with a 42–39 Pitt victory on September 10, 2016. Followed by 3 straight wins from Penn State with the most notable victory coming in 2018 where Penn State defeated Pitt 51-6 on September 8, 2018. The 100th game of the series took place in 2019 and was the last match up for the foreseeable future as Penn State athletic director Sandy Barbour claimed that an extension will not be considered until at least 2030.

=== Notre Dame ===
The series with Notre Dame began in 1909, and since that time no more than two consecutive seasons have passed without the teams meeting each other with the exception of the periods 1913–1929, 1938–1942, and 1979–1981. Notre Dame leads the series 51–21–1. Games between Pitt and the Irish had typically been scheduled annually, however, Notre Dame's agreement to play five ACC opponents each year starting in 2014 precluded annual games, so Pitt and Notre Dame will meet no more than twice during a three-year period.

=== Syracuse ===
The rivalry with fellow ACC conference member Syracuse began in 1916, and has been played annually since 1955, with the Panthers leading the series 37–31–3. Pitt and Syracuse also shared membership in the Big East Conference from 1991 to 2012 before both schools simultaneously moved to the ACC where they are designated as cross-divisional rivals and are scheduled to meet annually.

=== Cincinnati ===
When the University of Cincinnati joined the Big East Conference in 2005, the game between Pitt and the Bearcats was designated as the River City Rivalry with the annual winner of the game being awarded the Paddlewheel Trophy. Each team won four games during the eight-year span that both schools shared membership in the Big East. Pitt leads the series 9–5. The series was renewed in 2023 and 2024, with each team winning on the road.

=== Other rivalries ===
Pitt and Navy recently renewed their rivalry, which began in 1912, and was played 26 times in 29 years between 1961 and 1989. Played consecutively between 2007 and 2009, and again in 2013 and 2015, the series now stands with Pitt leading 22–15–3. Of historic interest, it was during the Pitt-Navy game at Annapolis on October 23, 1976, that Pitt running back Tony Dorsett broke the NCAA career rushing record.

Older rivalries against cross-town schools Duquesne and Carnegie Tech (now Carnegie Mellon University), as well as Washington & Jefferson, ended following the de-emphasizing of the football programs at those institutions.

== Team awards and accomplishments ==
=== Undefeated seasons ===
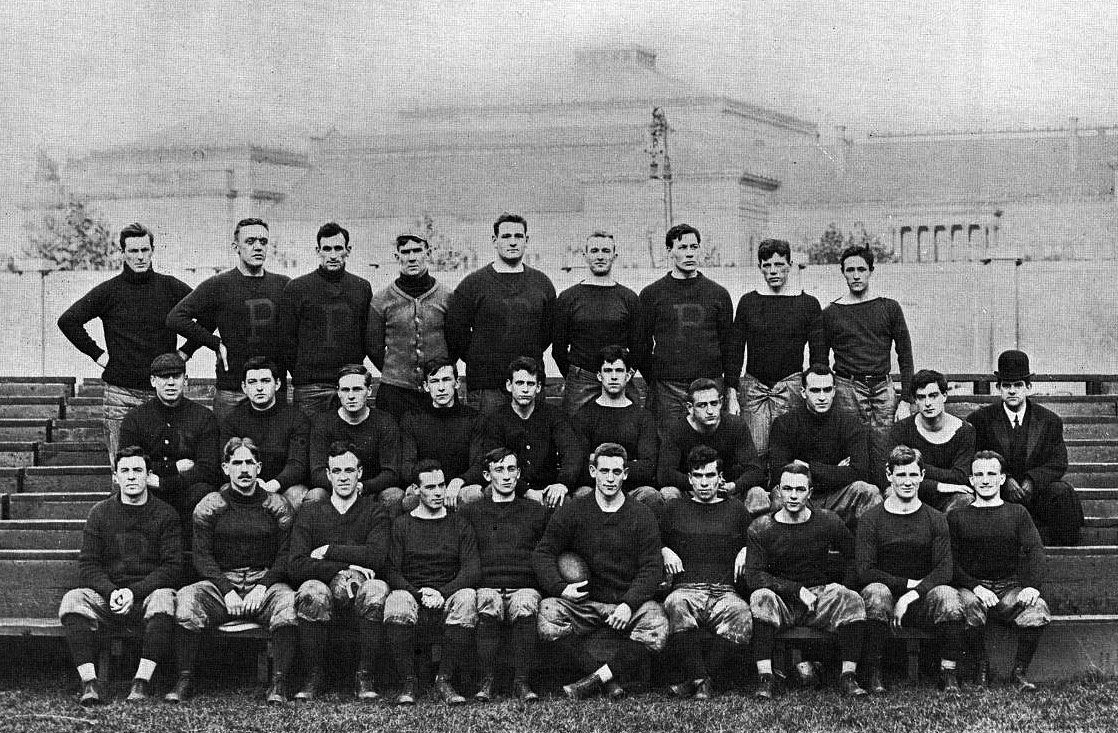
The undefeated and unscored upon 1910 Pitt team. Led by head coach Joe Thompson and captain Tex Richards (bottom row center, with football), Pitt went 9–0 and outscored its opponents 282–0.

Pitt has had eight undefeated seasons. Six of the eight seasons are perfect seasons with no ties. Of the eight undefeated seasons, four are not claimed as national championship seasons by Pitt. Pitt football finished the season undefeated in:

1904 (10–0) • 1910 (9–0) • 1915 (8–0) • 1916 (8–0) • 1917 (10–0) • 1920 (6–0–2) • 1937 (9–0–1) • 1976 (12–0)

=== Eastern and Conference titles ===
For much of its history, Pitt played as an independent, as did the majority of what are now labeled as Division I FBS football-playing schools located in the Northeast and Mid-Atlantic. During this time, Eastern Championships were named by independent third party selectors and awarded of various trophies, such as the early Jolly Trophy awarded by the Philadelphia-based Veteran Athletic Organization which presented it to the team with the best record in the East. The process of picking an Eastern Champion eventually came to be symbolized by the Lambert-Meadowlands Trophy awarded by the New Jersey Sports and Exposition Authority beginning in 1936. The Lambert-Meadowlands trophy, which is still awarded, is presented to the team deemed to be the best that located in the East or plays half its schedule against eligible Lambert teams. In total, Pitt has won 12 Eastern Championships.

In addition, in 1991, the majority of football independents in the East aligned themselves together in the Big East Football Conference. Round-robin play began in the Big East beginning in 1993, although a championship was awarded during its first two years.

Eastern and Conference Championships
Year	Title	Trophy	Coach	Record
1925	Eastern Champion	unknown	Jock Sutherland	8–1
1927	Eastern Champion	Jolly Trophy	Jock Sutherland	8–1–1
1929	Eastern Champion	unknown	Jock Sutherland	9–1
1931	Eastern Champion	unknown	Jock Sutherland	8–1
1932	Eastern Champion	unknown	Jock Sutherland	8–1–2
1934	Eastern Champion	unknown	Jock Sutherland	8–1
1936	Eastern Champion	Lambert-Meadowlands Trophy	Jock Sutherland	8–1–1
1937	Eastern Champion	Lambert-Meadowlands Trophy	Jock Sutherland	9–0–1
1955	Eastern Champion	Lambert-Meadowlands Trophy	John Michelosen	7–4
1976	Eastern Champion	Lambert-Meadowlands Trophy	Johnny Majors	12–0
1979	Eastern Champion	Lambert-Meadowlands Trophy	Jackie Sherrill	11–1
1980	Eastern Champion	Lambert-Meadowlands Trophy	Jackie Sherrill	11–1
2004	Big East co-Champion	Big East Championship Trophy	Walt Harris	8–4
2010	Big East co-Champion	Big East Championship Trophy	Dave Wannstedt	8–5
2021	ACC Champion	ACC Championship Trophy	Pat Narduzzi	11–2

=== Number 1 ranking ===
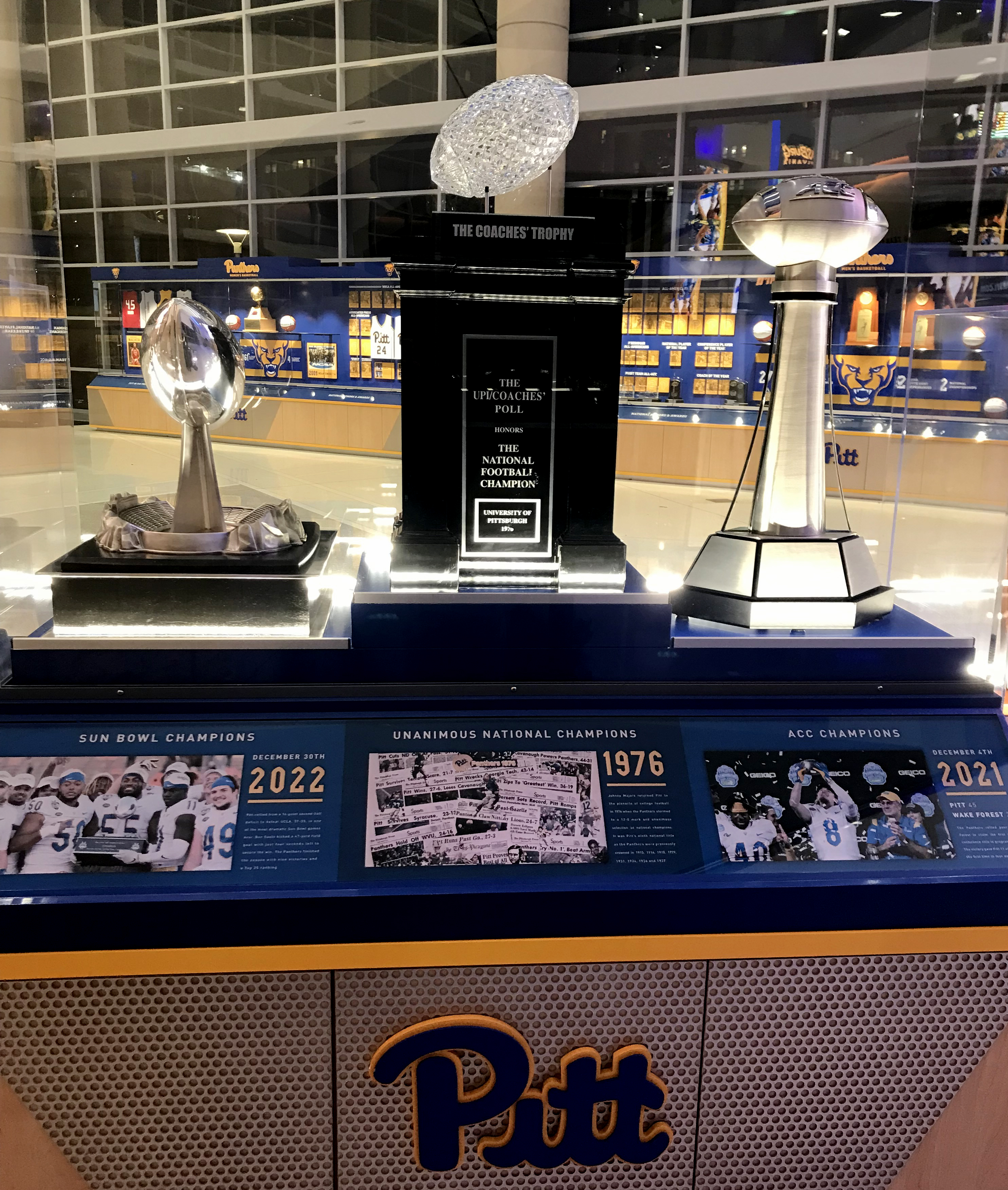
Pitt's 1976 National Championship trophy, 2021 ACC Championship trophy, and 2022 Sun Bowl trophy on display at the Petersen Events Center

Pitt has achieved the number one ranking in the major national polls (AP since 1936 and Coaches' since 1950) on the following occasions:

- 1982 (September 7, October 26, November 2)
- 1981 (November 3, 10, 17, 24)
- 1976 (November 9, 16, 23, 30, January 5, 1977^{#})
- 1939 (October 17)
- 1938 (October 18, 25, November 1)
- 1937 (November 9, 16, 23, 30^{#})

^{#}National Champion

== Individual awards ==
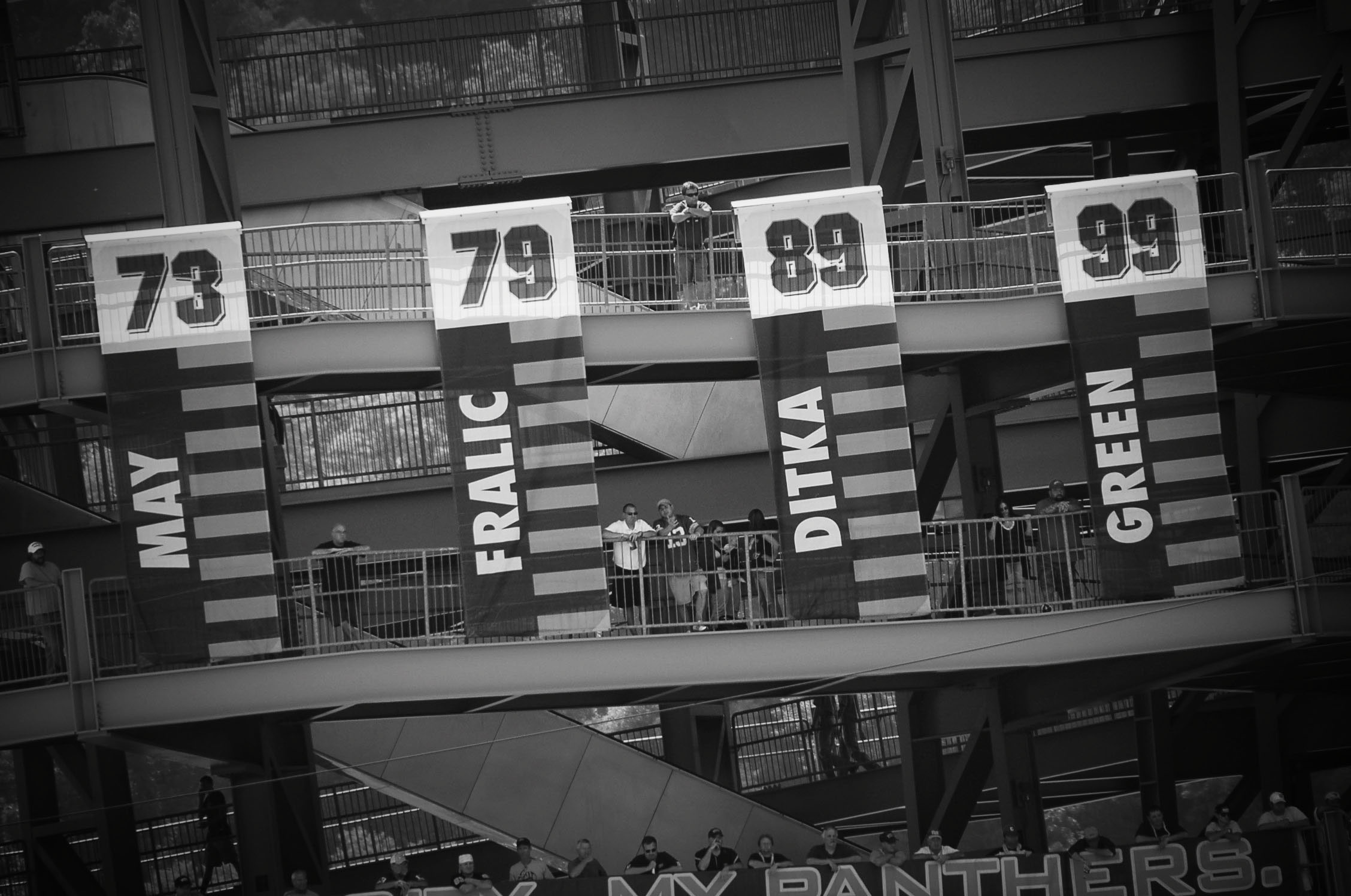
Some of the banners displayed at Heinz Field celebrating Pitt's retired numbers

=== Retired numbers ===
Pittsburgh has retired 11 numbers of former football players.

Pittsburgh Panthers retired numbers
No.	Player	Pos.	Tenure
1	Larry Fitzgerald	WR	2002–2003
13	Dan Marino	QB	1979–1982
33	Tony Dorsett	RB	1973–1976
42	Marshall Goldberg	FB	1936–1938
65	Joe Schmidt	LB	1950–1952
73	Mark May	OT	1977–1980
75	Jim Covert	OT	1979–1983
79	Bill Fralic	OT	1981–1984
89	Mike Ditka	E	1958–1960
97	Aaron Donald	DT	2010–2013
99	Hugh Green	DE	1977–1980

=== Major award winners ===
- Heisman Trophy

Tony Dorsett – 1976

- Maxwell Award

Tony Dorsett – 1976
Hugh Green – 1980

- Walter Camp Award

Tony Dorsett – 1976
Hugh Green – 1980
Larry Fitzgerald – 2003

- Chuck Bednarik Award

Aaron Donald – 2013

- Lombardi Award

Hugh Green – 1980
Aaron Donald – 2013

- Bronko Nagurski Trophy

Aaron Donald – 2013

- Outland Trophy

Mark May – 1980
Aaron Donald – 2013

- Biletnikoff Award

Antonio Bryant – 2000
Larry Fitzgerald – 2003
Jordan Addison – 2021

- Johnny Unitas Golden Arm Award

Kenny Pickett – 2021

- Disney's Wide World of Sports Spirit Award

James Conner – 2016
Tre Tipton – 2021

- Patrick Mannelly Award

Cal Adomitis – 2021

- Walter Camp Coach of the Year

Johnny Majors – 1973
Jackie Sherrill – 1981

- AFCA Coach of the Year

Johnny Majors – 1976

- Eddie Robinson Coach of the Year

Johnny Majors – 1973, 1976

==== Heisman finalists ====
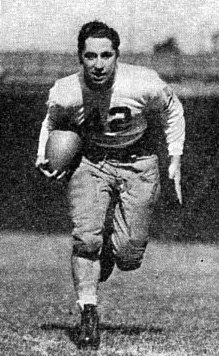
College Football Hall of Fame inductee Marshall Goldberg was the runner-up for the Heisman Trophy in 1938

Pitt players were among the finalists for the Heisman Trophy Award in 15 different seasons.

Year	Name	Pos.	Finish
1937	Marshall Goldberg	RB	3rd
1938	Marshall Goldberg	RB	2nd
1941	Edgar Jones	RB	7th
1960	Mike Ditka	E	6th
1975	Tony Dorsett	RB	4th
1976	Tony Dorsett	RB	1st
1977	Matt Cavanaugh	QB	7th
1980	Hugh Green	DE	2nd
1981	Dan Marino	QB	4th
1982	Dan Marino	QB	9th
1983	Bill Fralic	T	8th
1984	Bill Fralic	T	6th
1987	Craig Heyward	RB	5th
2003	Larry Fitzgerald	WR	2nd
2021	Kenny Pickett	QB	3rd

=== College Football Hall of Fame inductees ===
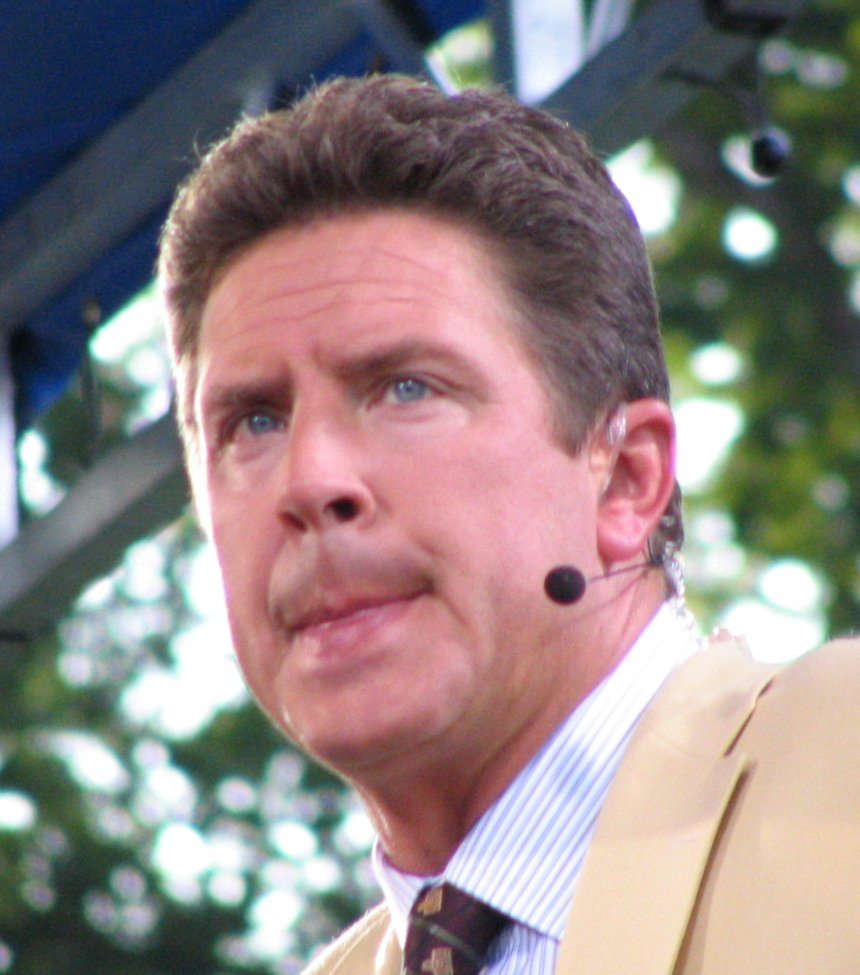
Former Pitt quarterback Dan Marino is a member of both the pro and college football halls of fame.

27 total former players or coaches have been inducted into the College Football Hall of Fame.

==== Players ====
The College Football Hall of Fame has inducted 21 former Panthers as players.

- Ruben Brown (1991–1994)
- Jimbo Covert (1979–1982)
- Averell Daniell (1934–1936)
- Tom Davies (1918–1921)
- Mike Ditka (1958–1960)
- Aaron Donald (2010–2013)
- Joseph Donchess (1927–1929)
- Tony Dorsett (1973–1976)
- Larry Fitzgerald (2002–2003)
- Bill Fralic (1981–1984)
- Marshall Goldberg (1936–1938)
- Hugh Green (1977–1980)
- Dan Marino (1979–1982)
- Mark May (1977–1980)
- George McLaren (1915–1918)
- Robert Peck (1913–1916)
- Joe Schmidt (1950–1952)
- Joe Skladany (1931–1933)
- Herb Stein (1918–1921)
- Joe Thompson (player 1904–1906, coach 1909–1912)
- Hube Wagner (1910–1913)

In addition, Herb McCracken, who played at Pitt from 1918 to 1920, was inducted as a coach of Allegheny and Lafayette.

==== Coaches ====
The College Football Hall of Fame has inducted four former Panther coaches.

- Jock Sutherland (Pitt player from 1914 to 1917, and Pitt coach from 1924 to 1938)
- Pop Warner (Pitt coach from 1915 to 1923)
- Clark Shaughnessy (Pitt coach from 1943 to 1945)
- Len Casanova (Pitt coach in 1950)

The following two Pitt coaches have been inducted into the Hall of Fame as players at their respective schools.

- Wes Fesler (Ohio State; Pitt coach in 1946)
- Johnny Majors (Tennessee; Pitt coach from 1973 to 1976 and from 1993 to 1996)

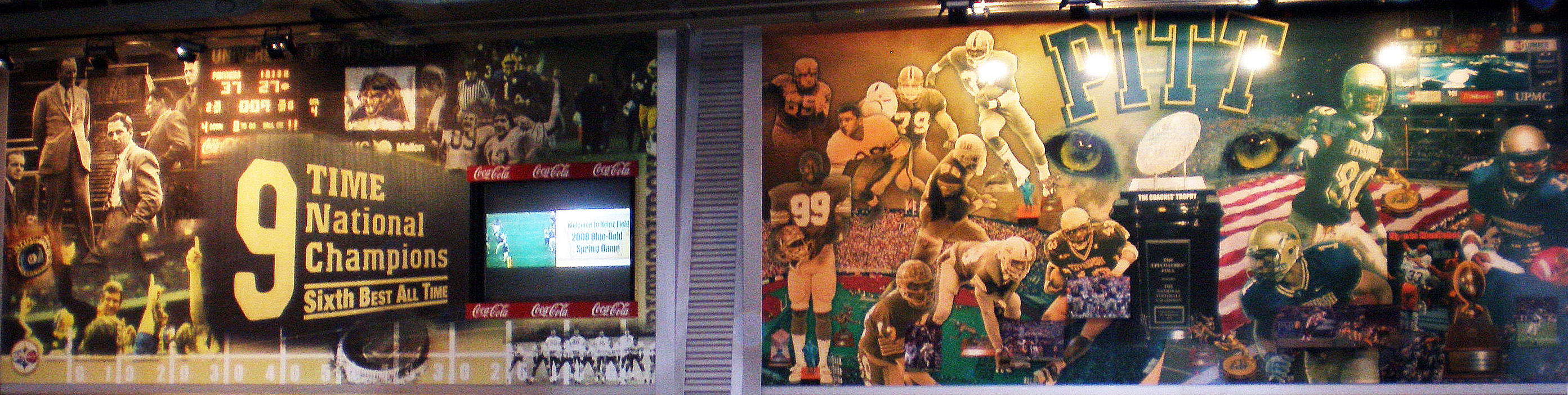
Pitt football murals displayed in the Great Hall of Heinz Field

=== First–team All-Americans ===
Pitt has had 82 different players selected as First Team All-American throughout its history for a total of 98 all-time First Team All-American Selections. That total includes 55 selections which have attained Consensus status. Pitt's Consensus First Team selections ranks as the eighth most consensus All-Americans among Division I FBS schools. The following list of Pitt's First Team All-Americans is compiled for the Pitt football media guide from various sources including the NCAA Football Guide, and consists of players who were first-team selections on one or more of the All American teams which were made over the years by Walter Camp, Grantland Rice, Caspar Whitney, International News Service, Associated Press, United Press International, NANA, NEA, the Football Writers Association of America, the Football Coaches Association, the All-America Board, Newsweek, The Sporting News, and Sports Illustrated.

First Team All-American Selections

Year	Name	Pos.
1914	Robert Peck	C
1915	Robert Peck*	C
1916	Robert Peck*	C
1916	James Herron*	E
1916	Andy Hastings	F
1916	Claude Thornhill	G
1917	H.C. "Doc" Carlson	E
1917	Jock Sutherland*	G
1917	Dale Sies*	G
1917	George McLaren	F
1918	Leonard Hilty*	T
1918	Tom Davies*	B
1918	George McLaren*	F
1920	Tom Davies	B
1920	Herb Stein*	C
1921	Herb Stein*	C
1925	Ralph Chase*	T
1927	Bill Kern	T
1927	Gilbert Welch^{#}	B

Year	Name	Pos.
1928	Mike Getto*	T
1929	Joe Donchess^{#}	E
1929	Ray Montgomery*	G
1929	Toby Uansa	H
1929	Thomas Parkinson	B
1931	Jesse Quatse*	T
1932	Joe Skladany*	E
1932	Warren Heller^{#}	B
1933	Joe Skladany*	E
1934	Charles Hartwig*	E
1934	George Shotwell*	G
1934	Izzy Weinstock	C
1935	Art Detzel	T
1936	Averell Daniell*	T
1936	William Glassford	G
1937	Frank Souchak	E
1937	Bill Daddio	E
1937	Tony Matisi*	T
1937	Marshall Goldberg*	B

Year	Name	Pos.
1938	Marshall Goldberg^{#}	B
1938	Bill Daddio	E
1941	Ralph Fife	G
1949	Bernie Barkouskie	G
1952	Eldred Kraemer	T
1952	Joe Schmidt	LB
1956	Joe Walton^{#}	E
1958	John Guzik*	G
1960	Mike Ditka^{#}	E
1963	Paul Martha*	B
1963	Ernie Borghetti	T
1973	Tony Dorsett	RB
1974	Tony Dorsett	RB
1974	Gary Burley	MG
1975	Tony Dorsett	RB
1976	Tony Dorsett^{#}	RB
1976	Al Romano*	MG
1977	Matt Cavanaugh	QB
1977	Randy Holloway*	DT

Year	Name	Pos.
1977	Bob Jury*	DB
1977	Tom Brzoza*	C
1978	Hugh Green*	DE
1978	Gordon Jones	WR
1979	Hugh Green^{#}	DE
1980	Hugh Green^{#}	DE
1980	Mark May^{#}	OT
1981	Sal Sunseri*	LB
1981	Jimbo Covert	OT
1981	Dan Marino	QB
1981	Julius Dawkins	SE
1982	Jimbo Covert*	OT
1982	Bill Maas	DT
1982	Bill Fralic	OT
1983	Bill Fralic^{#}	OT
1984	Bill Fralic^{#}	OT
1986	Randy Dixon*	OT
1986	Tony Woods*	DE
1987	Ezekial Gadson	LB

Year	Name	Pos.
1987	Craig Heyward*	RB
1988	Mark Stepnoski*	OG
1988	Jerry Olsavsky	LB
1989	Marc Spindler	DT
1990	Brian Greenfield*	P
1994	Ruben Brown	OT
2000	Antonio Bryant*	WR
2003	Larry Fitzgerald^{#}	WR
2006	H.B. Blades	LB
2008	Scott McKillop	LB
2009	Dorin Dickerson	TE
2010	Jabaal Sheard	DE
2013	Aaron Donald^{#}	DT
2014	James Conner	RB
2016	Quadree Henderson*	KR
2016	Dorian Johnson	OG
2020	Patrick Jones II*	DE
2020	Rashad Weaver*	DE
2021	Jordan Addison*	WR
2021	Cal Adomitis	LS
2021	Kenny Pickett	QB
2022	Calijah Kancey^{#}	DT

*indicates Consensus status. ^{#}indicates unanimous selection. Ref:

=== Academic All-Americans ===
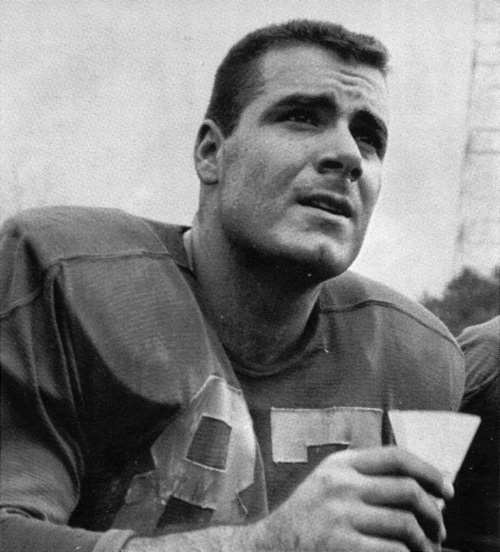
Joe Walton was both a First Team Athletic and Academic All-American in 1956

Pitt has had 15 different football players named as College Sports Information Directors of America Academic-All Americans for a total of 23 selections. In addition, five Pitt players have been named as a National Scholar-Athletes by the National Football Foundation and three players have awarded NCAA Postgraduate Scholarships.

Academic Honors

Name	Year(s)	Selection	Position
Dave Blandino	1973	NFF	OL
Ralph Cindrich	1971	AA	LB
Vince Crochunis	2002, 2003, 2004	AA	DL
Dick Deitrick	1952	AA	E
Jeff Delaney	1976, 1978; 1978; 1979	AA; NFF; NCAA	DB
Wayne DiBartola	1981	AA	RB
Rob Fada	1981, 1982	AA	OL
Al Grigaliunas	1963	NFF	E
John Guzik	1958	AA	G
Connor Lee	2008	AA	PK

Name	Year(s)	Selection	Position
Bill Lindner*	1959	AA	T
Greg Meisner	1979, 1980	AA	DL
Lou Palatella	1954	AA	T
J.C. Pelusi	1982	AA	DL
Louis Riddick	1989, 1990	AA	DB
Robert Schilken	1986	NCAA	DE
Dan Stephens	2003, 2004	AA	DL
Mark Stepnoski	1986, 1988; 1988; 1989	AA; NFF; NCAA	OL
Todd Toerper	1974	NFF	WR
Joe Walton	1956	AA	E

AA = Academic All-American; NCAA = NCAA Postgraduate Scholarship; NFF = National Football Foundation National Scholar-Athlete Ref:
^{*Listed as an Academic All-American in Pitt's Media Guide but not by CoSIDA.}

=== Conference awards ===
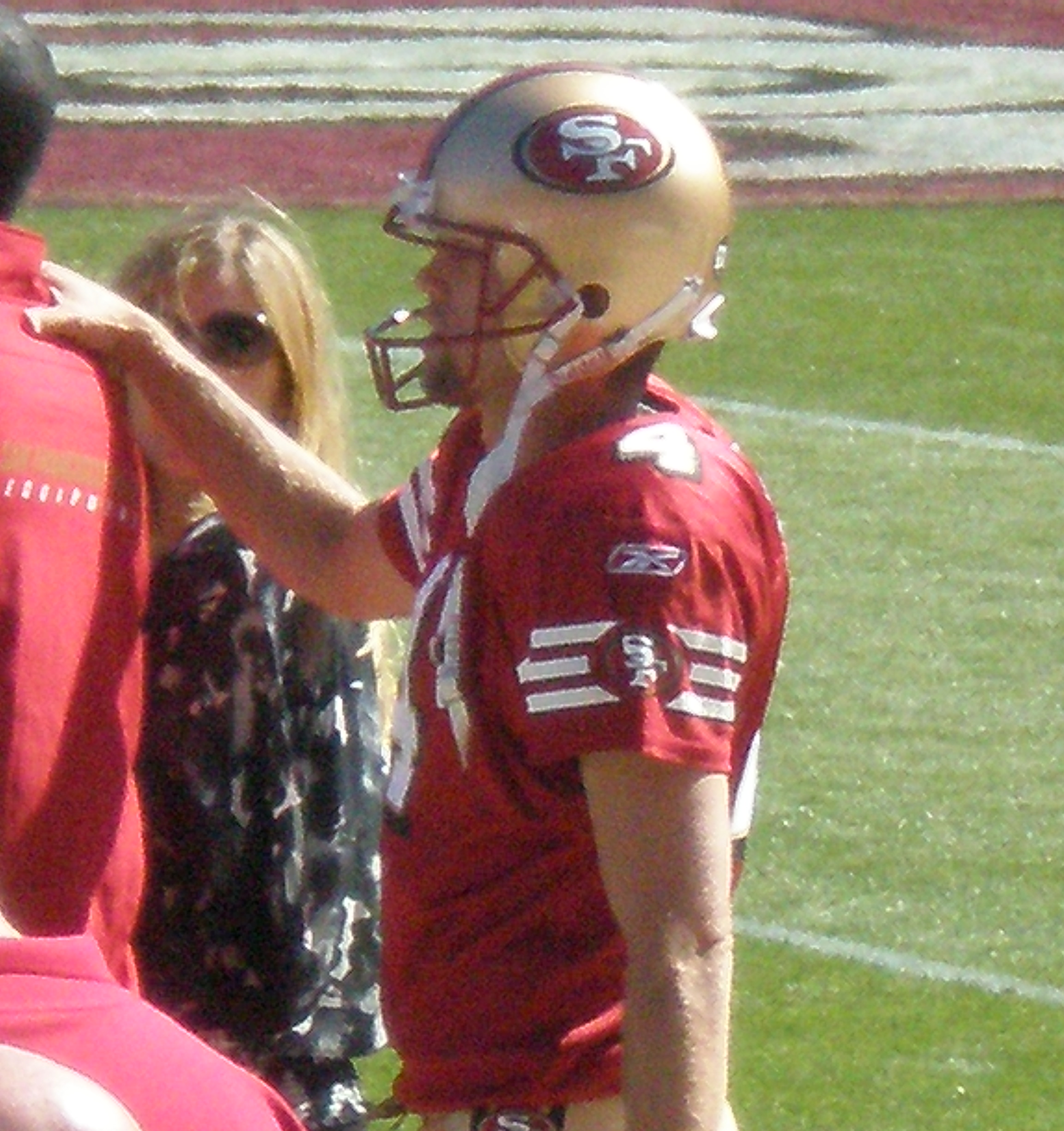
Three-time Pro Bowl punter Andy Lee was the Big East Conference's only two-time Special Teams Player of the Year

The University of Pittsburgh football program was an independent for the majority of its history. It joined the Big East Conference for football in 1991, the inaugural year that the Big East sponsored the sport. Pitt won a share of the Big East football championship in 2004 and 2010. In 2013, Pitt joined the ACC. Several Panthers have won various Big East Conference football awards and Atlantic Coast Conference football awards, including Offensive Player, Defensive Player, Special Teams Player, Rookie, and Coach of the Year.

- Player of the Year
  2014 James Conner, RB, So
  2021 Kenny Pickett, QB, Sr
- Offensive Player of the Year
  1994 Billy West, RB, So
  2000 Antonio Bryant*, WR, So
  2003 Larry Fitzgerald, WR, So
  2009 Dion Lewis, RB, Fr
  2014 James Conner, RB, So
  2021 Kenny Pickett, QB, Sr
- Defensive Player of the Year
  2006 H.B. Blades, LB, Sr
  2008 Scott McKillop, LB, Sr
  2009 Greg Romeus*, DE, Jr
  2009 Mick Williams*, DT, Sr
  2010 Jabaal Sheard, DE, Sr
  2013 Aaron Donald, DT, Sr
  2022 Calijah Kancey, DT, Sr
- Special Teams Player of the Year
  2002 Andy Lee*, P, Jr
  2003 Andy Lee*, P, Sr
- Rookie of the Year
  1991 Tom Tumulty, LB
  2002 Larry Fitzgerald, WR
  2007 LeSean McCoy^{#}, RB
  2009 Dion Lewis^{#}, RB
  2015 Jordan Whitehead*, S
  2015 Qadree Ollison*, RB
- Scholar-Athlete of the Year
  2004 Vince Crochunis, DL
  Administration & Policy Studies
  2008 Conor Lee, PK
  Business & Economics, MBA
- Most Courageous (Brian Piccolo Award)
  2016 James Conner, RB, JR
- Coach of the Year
  1997 Walt Harris, 1st year
  2004 Walt Harris, 8th year

*co-recipient, ^{#}unanimous selection

== Panthers in the NFL ==
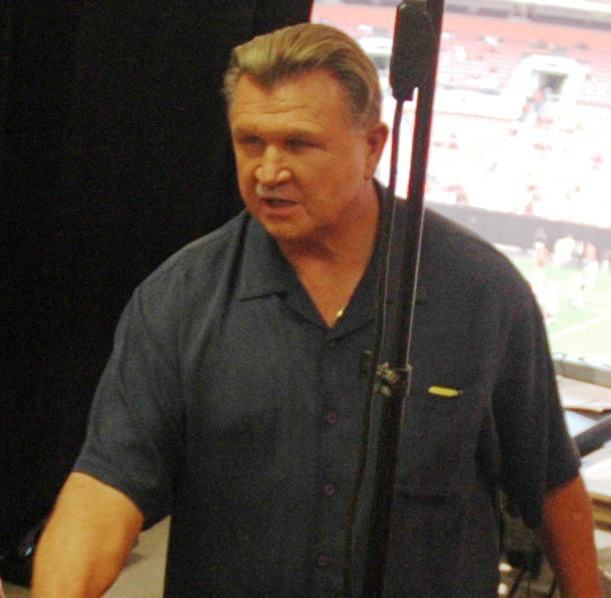
Hall of Famer Mike Ditka was a first round draft pick in 1961

Pitt has produced 289 NFL players including ten that went on to be inducted into the Pro Football Hall of Fame and 31 that have been selected to play in the Pro Bowl. Furthermore, in a survey of NFL drafts from 1979 to 2009, ESPN rated Pitt third, behind only USC and Miami, for having "the most fertile NFL draft pipelines." In addition, Pitt has been ranked second among all schools for the historical value of its drafted players.

=== Pro Football Hall of Fame inductees ===
Eleven Panthers have been elected into the Pro Football Hall of Fame. Pitt is tied for third among all colleges and universities for the number of former players inducted. Pitt's eleven Hall of Famers and their year of induction and years played are:

- Joe Schmidt (Enshrined in 1973; Played 1949–1952)
- Mike Ditka (Enshrined in 1988; Played 1957–1960)
- Tony Dorsett (Enshrined in 1994; Played 1972–1976)
- Dan Marino (Enshrined in 2005; Played 1979–1982)
- Russ Grimm (Enshrined in 2010; Played 1977–1980)
- Rickey Jackson (Enshrined in 2010; Played 1977–1980)
- Curtis Martin (Enshrined in 2012; Played 1991–1994)
- Chris Doleman (Enshrined in 2012; Played 1981–1984)
- Jimbo Covert (Enshrined in 2020; Played 1978–1982)
- Darrelle Revis (Enshrined in 2023; Played 2004–2006)
- Larry Fitzgerald (Enshrined in 2026; Played 2002–2003)

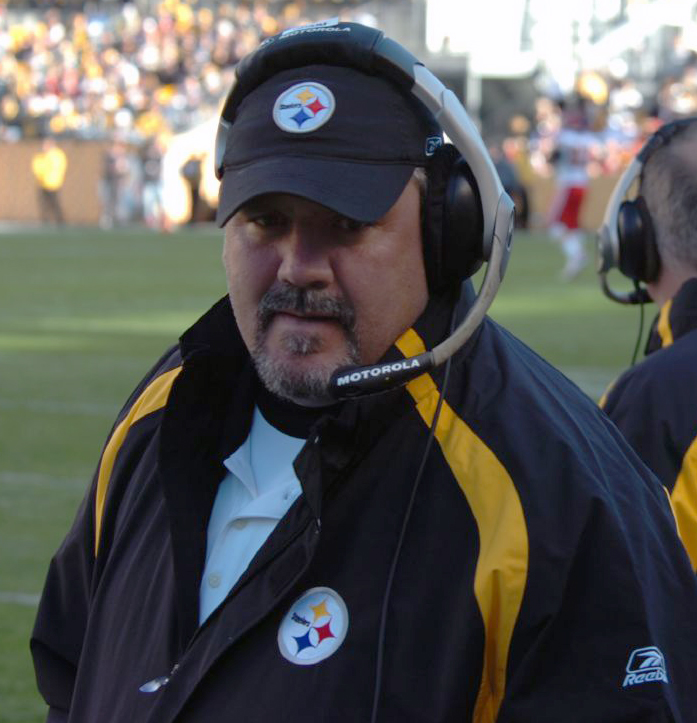
Four-time Pro Bowler Russ Grimm was inducted into the Pro Football Hall of Fame in 2010

=== NFL All-Decade Teams ===
The following former Panthers were named to NFL All-Decade Teams (and 75th and 100th Anniversary All-Time Teams, selected in 1994 and 2019, respectively). Bold indicates those elected to the Pro Football Hall of Fame.

**NFL 1950s All-Decade Team**
No.	Player	Position	Tenure
65	**Joe Schmidt**	LB	1949–52

**NFL 1980s All-Decade Team**
No.	Player	Position	Tenure
75	**Jimbo Covert**	T	1978–82
79	Bill Fralic	G	1981–84
56	**Russ Grimm**	G	1977–80

**NFL 1990s All-Decade Team**
No.	Player	Position	Tenure
77	Mark Stepnoski	C	1985–88
56	**Chris Doleman**	DE	1981–84

**NFL 75th Anniversary All-Time Team**
No.	Player	Position	Tenure
89	**Mike Ditka**	TE	1957–60

**NFL 100th Anniversary All-Time Team**
No.	Player	Position	Tenure
13	**Dan Marino**	QB	1979–82
1	**Larry Fitzgerald**	WR	2002–03
89	**Mike Ditka**	TE	1957–60
65	**Joe Schmidt**	LB	1949–52

**NFL 2010s All-Decade Team**
No.	Player	Position	Tenure
25	LeSean McCoy	RB	2007–08
1	**Larry Fitzgerald**	WR	2002–03
97	Aaron Donald	DT	2010–13
25	**Darrelle Revis**	CB	2004–06

=== Pro Bowl selections ===
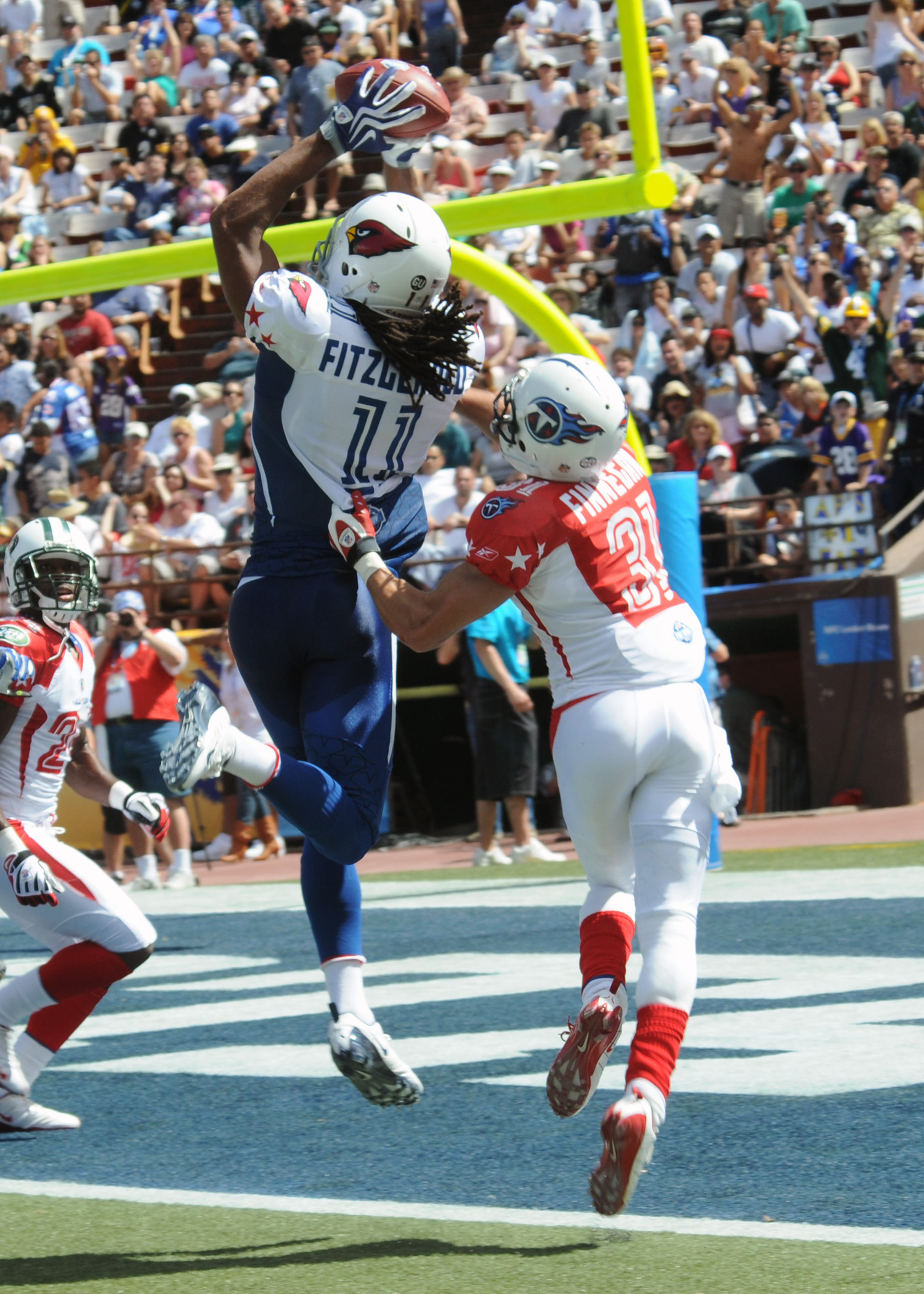
Larry Fitzgerald catches a touchdown pass during the 2009 Pro Bowl in which he earned MVP honors

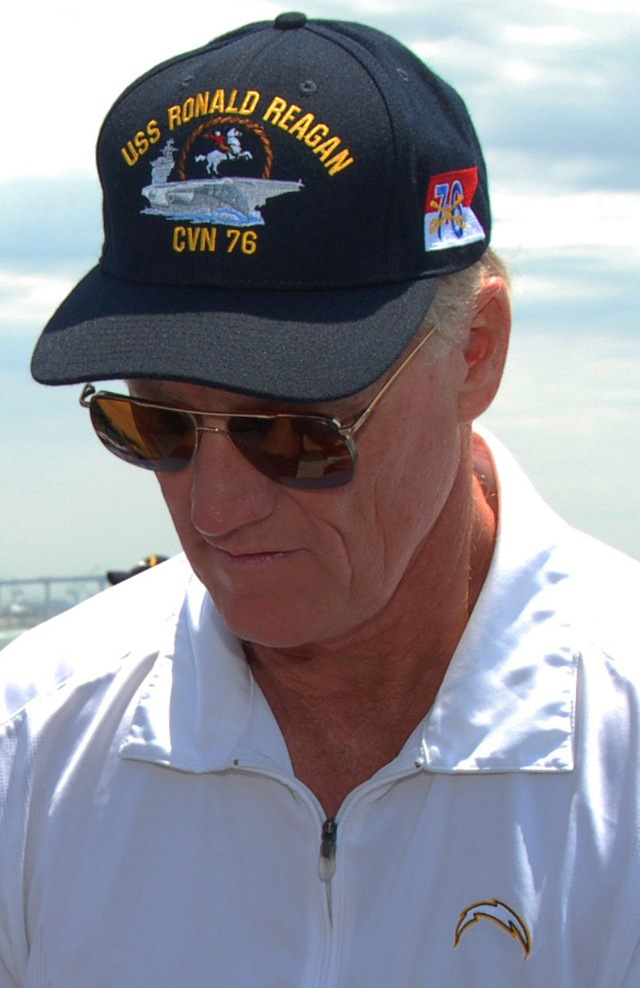
Marty Schottenheimer played in the 1965 Pro Bowl and served 21 years as a head coach in the NFL

Through the 2025 NFL season, 35 former Pitt players have been selected to appear in the NFL Pro Bowl for a total of 131 all-time Pro Bowl selections. Pitt has been represented by at least one Pro Bowl selection every year since 1981.

Panthers selected for the Pro Bowl
Selection(s)	Name	Position	Team: Season(s)
11	Larry Fitzgerald	WR	Cardinals: 2005, 2007, 2008, 2009, 2010, 2011, 2012, 2013, 2015, 2016, 2017
10	Aaron Donald	DT	Rams: 2014, 2015, 2016, 2017, 2018, 2019, 2020, 2021, 2022, 2023
10	Joe Schmidt	LB	Lions: 1954, 1955, 1956, 1957, 1958, 1959, 1960, 1961, 1962, 1963
9	Ruben Brown	G	Bills: 1996, 1997, 1998, 1999, 2000, 2001, 2002, 2003; Bears: 2006
9	Dan Marino	QB	Dolphins: 1983, 1984, 1985, 1986, 1987, 1991, 1992, 1994, 1995
8	Chris Doleman	DE	Vikings: 1987, 1988, 1989, 1990, 1992, 1993; Falcons: 1995; 49ers: 1997
7	Darrelle Revis	CB	Jets: 2008, 2009, 2010, 2011, 2015; Buccaneers: 2013; Patriots: 2014
6	Rickey Jackson	LB	Saints: 1983, 1984, 1985, 1986, 1992, 1993
6	LeSean McCoy	RB	Eagles: 2011, 2013, 2014; Bills: 2015, 2016, 2017
5	Mike Ditka	TE	Bears: 1961, 1962, 1963, 1964, 1965
5	Curtis Martin	RB	Patriots: 1995, 1996; Jets: 1998, 2001, 2004
5	Mark Stepnoski	C	Cowboys: 1992, 1993, 1994; Oilers: 1995, 1996
4	Tony Dorsett	RB	Cowboys: 1978, 1981, 1982, 1983
4	Bill Fralic	G	Falcons: 1986, 1987, 1988, 1989
4	Russ Grimm	G	Redskins: 1983, 1984, 1985, 1986
3	Jeff Christy	C	Vikings: 1998, 1999; Buccaneers: 2000
3	Andy Lee	P	49ers: 2007, 2009, 2011
3	Bill McPeak	DE	Steelers: 1952, 1953, 1956
3	John Reger	LB	Steelers: 1959, 1960, 1961
2	James Conner	RB	Steelers: 2018; Cardinals: 2021
2	Jimbo Covert	T	Bears: 1985, 1986
2	Hugh Green	LB	Buccaneers: 1982, 1983
2	Bill Maas	NT	Chiefs: 1986, 1987
2	Brian O'Neill	T	Vikings: 2021, 2024
2	Carlton Williamson	S	49ers: 1984, 1985
1	Fred Cox	K	Vikings: 1970
1	Joe Flacco	QB	Bengals: 2025
1	Sean Gilbert	DT	Rams: 1993
1	Marshall Goldberg	FB	Cardinals: 1941
1	Craig Heyward	RB	Falcons: 1995
1	Fred Hoaglin	C	Browns: 1969
1	Mark May	T	Redskins: 1988
1	Dave Moore	TE	Buccaneers: 2006
1	John Paluck	DE	Redskins: 1964
1	Marty Schottenheimer	LB	Bills: 1965

=== NFL first round draftees ===
Throughout its history, the University of Pittsburgh has had 279 players selected 300 times in professional football drafts when totaling both NFL and AFL picks. This includes 27 First Round NFL draft picks since 1960.

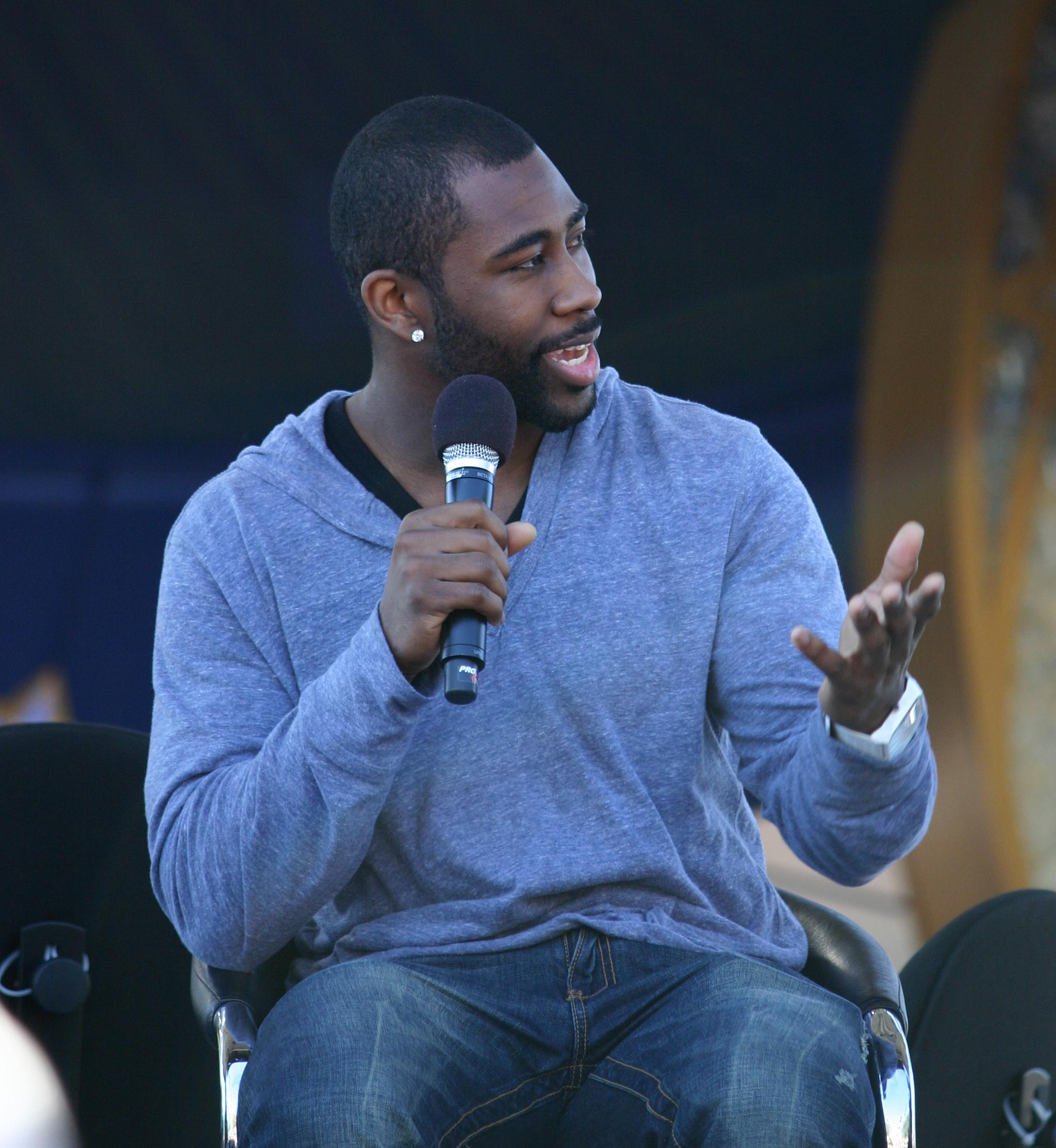
Cornerback Darrelle Revis, a first round draft pick of the New York Jets, had five tackles and an interception in the 2009 Pro Bowl

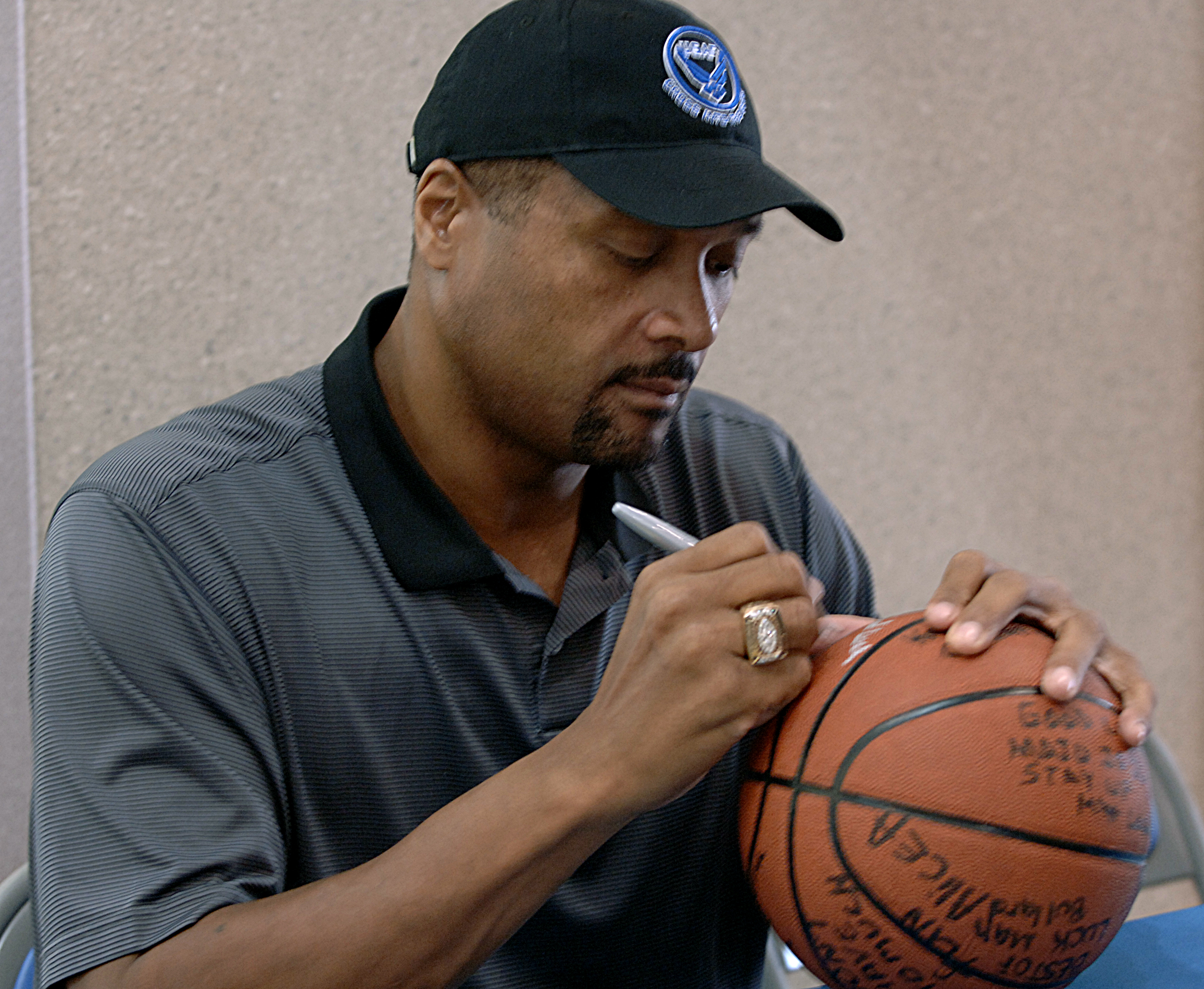
Outland Trophy winner and first round NFL draft pick Mark May played in the 1989 Pro Bowl as well as three Super Bowls

Panthers selected in the first round of an NFL Draft
Year	Name	Position	Team	overall pick
1961	Mike Ditka	TE	Bears	5
1964	Paul Martha	S	Steelers	7
1977	Tony Dorsett	RB	Cowboys	2
1978	Randy Holloway	DE	Vikings	21
1981	Hugh Green	LB	Buccaneers	7
1981	Randy McMillan	RB	Colts	12
1981	Mark May	T	Redskins	20
1983	Jim Covert	T	Bears	6
1983	Tim Lewis	CB	Packers	11
1983	Dan Marino	QB	Dolphins	29
1984	Bill Maas	NT	Chiefs	5
1985	Bill Fralic	T	Falcons	2
1985	Chris Doleman	LB	Vikings	4
1986	Bob Buczkowski	DT	Raiders	24
1987	Tony Woods	LB	Seahawks	18
1988	Craig Heyward	RB	Saints	24
1989	Burt Grossman	DE	Chargers	8
1989	Tom Ricketts	T	Steelers	24
1992	Sean Gilbert	DT	Rams	3
1995	Ruben Brown	OL	Bills	14
2004	Larry Fitzgerald	WR	Cardinals	3
2007	Darrelle Revis	CB	Jets	14
2008	Jeff Otah	OL	Panthers	19
2011	Jon Baldwin	WR	Chiefs	26
2014	Aaron Donald	DT	Rams	13
2022	Kenny Pickett	QB	Steelers	20
2023	Calijah Kancey	DE	Buccaneers	19

=== Current NFL players ===
As of May 18, 2026, there are 32 NFL players that played college football at the University of Pittsburgh:

- Israel Abanikanda, RB (Dallas Cowboys)
- Jordan Addison^{*}, WR (Minnesota Vikings)
- Cal Adomitis, LS (Pittsburgh Steelers)
- Gavin Bartholomew, TE (Minnesota Vikings)
- James Conner^{#}, RB (Arizona Cardinals)
- SirVocea Dennis, LB (Tampa Bay Buccaneers)
- M. J. Devonshire, CB (Green Bay Packers)
- Joe Flacco^{#}^{&}, QB (Cincinnati Bengals)
- Brandon George, LB (Kansas City Chiefs)
- Matt Goncalves, G (Indianapolis Colts)
- Erick Hallett, FS (Tennessee Titans)
- Damar Hamlin, SS (Buffalo Bills)
- Dane Jackson, CB (Carolina Panthers)
- Patrick Jones II, DE (Carolina Panthers)
- Calijah Kancey, DE (Tampa Bay Buccaneers)
- Lucas Krull, TE (Denver Broncos)
- Kyle Louis, LB (Miami Dolphins)
- Tamon Lynum, CB (Pittsburgh Steelers)
- Avonte Maddox, CB (Detroit Lions)
- Donovan McMillon, CB (Cleveland Browns)
- Bub Means, WR (New Orleans Saints)
- Jimmy Morrissey, C (Indianapolis Colts)
- Konata Mumpfield, WR (Los Angeles Rams)
- Brian O'Neill^{#}, T (Minnesota Vikings)
- Kenny Pickett, QB (Carolina Panthers)
- Jason Pinnock, CB (New York Giants)
- Desmond Reid, RB (Buffalo Bills)
- Ben Sauls, K (New York Giants)
- Branson Taylor, G (Los Angeles Chargers)
- Carter Warren, T (Miami Dolphins)
- Jared Wayne, WR (Houston Texans)
- A. J. Woods, CB (Atlanta Falcons)

^{#}Selected to the Pro Bowl. ^{*}Played two seasons at Pitt before transferring to USC for his final season. ^{&}Played two seasons at Pitt before transferring to Delaware for his final three seasons.

== Future non-conference opponents ==
Announced schedules as of December 9, 2025.

2027	2028	2029	2030	2031	2032	2033	2034	2035	2036
vs Wisconsin^{1}	Northern Illinois	Delaware	at West Virginia	West Virginia	at West Virginia	West Virginia	at West Virginia	West Virginia	at West Virginia
Western Michigan	at UConn	West Virginia	Toledo	Notre Dame		at Notre Dame	Notre Dame		at Notre Dame
UConn	Notre Dame	at UCF							
		Richmond							

^{1}Aer Lingus College Football Classic, Dublin, Ireland

== Further information ==
- University of Pittsburgh Football Vault: The History of the Panthers. Sam Sciullo, Jr. Atlanta: Whitman Pulblishing, 2008, ISBN 0-7948-2653-9
- University of Pittsburgh Football Media Guide 2008. E.J. Borghetti, Mendy Nestor, and Celeste Welsch eds. Pittsburgh: University of Pittsburgh, 2008
- Paths of Glory: The Dramatic Story of Pitt's First Century of Football. Video. Ross Sports Productions. 1991
- Greatest Moments in Pitt Football History. Mike Bynum, Larry Eldridge, Jr., and Sam Sciullo, Jr. eds. Nashville, Tennessee: Athlon Sports Communications, 1994, ISBN 1-878839-04-7
- Hail to Pitt: A Sports History of the University of Pittsburgh. Jim O'Brien, ed. and Marty Wolfson, illus. Pittsburgh; Wolfson Publishing Co., 1982, ISBN 978-0916114084
- Pitt: The Story of the University of Pittsburgh 1787–1987. Robert C. Alberts. Pittsburgh, Pennsylvania: University of Pittsburgh Press, 1986, ISBN 0-8229-1150-7
- Sciullo, Sam Jr. (2000). Pitt Stadium Memories 1925–1999. University of Pittsburgh. ASIN B0006RFHJQ.
- Tales from the Pitt Panthers. Sam Sciullo, Jr. Champaign, Illinois: Sports Publishing LLC, 2004, ISBN 1-58261-198-X
- The Year the Panthers Roared. Francis J. Fitzgerald, ed., Louisville, Kentucky, AdCraft Sports, 1996, ISBN 1-887761-06-3
- Jock Sutherland: Architect of Men. Harry G. Scott. New York: Exposition Press, 1954.
