= Will Windham =

American football player and coach (born 1985)

Current position
- Title: Defensive coordinator & safeties coach
- Team: Texas State
- Conference: Sun Belt

Biographical details
- Born: March 21, 1985 (age 41); Tupelo, Mississippi, U.S.
- Education: Mississippi State University (2007, 2012)

Coaching career (HC unless noted)
- 2009–2010: Saint Stanislaus (MS) (DL)
- 2011–2013: Mississippi State (GA)
- 2014: Penn State (GA)
- 2015: Davidson (DL)
- 2016–2017: Georgia (DQC)
- 2018–2020: Kent State (ILB/S)
- 2021–2023: South Alabama (LB)
- 2024–2025: South Alabama (DC/S)
- 2026–present: Texas State (DC/S)

Will Windham (born March 21, 1985) is an American college football coach and former player. He is the defensive coordinator and safeties coach for the Texas State University, positions he has held since 2026.

== Coaching career ==
=== Saint Stanislaus (MS) ===
Windham started his coaching career as the defensive line coach at Saint Stanislaus College in Bay Saint Louis, Mississippi from 2009 to 2010. He helped the Rocks to a Class 4A State Championship in 2009.

=== Mississippi State ===
From 2011 to 2013, Windham served as a graduate assistant for the Mississippi State Bulldogs. He worked with the defensive line and helped the team win the 2011 Music City Bowl and the 2013 Liberty Bowl.

=== Penn State ===
In 2014, Windham served as a graduate assistant for the Penn State Nittany Lions. He assisted defensive coordinator Bob Shoop and defensive line coach Sean Spencer and helped the team lead the Big 10 in scoring defense with 27 touchdowns, 18 field goals and 18.6 yards per game along with winning the 2014 Pinstripe Bowl.

=== Davidson ===
On March 11, 2015, Windham was named as the defensive line coach for the Davidson Wildcats.

=== Georgia ===
From 2016 to 2017, Windham served as a defensive quality control coach for the Georgia Bulldogs. He helped the team win the 2016 Liberty Bowl in 2016. During the 2017 season, he helped the defense hold 10-of-13 opponents to 14 points or less along with being a part of the staff advancing to the 2018 College Football Playoff National Championship.

=== Kent State ===
On January 30, 2018, Windham was named as the inside linebackers coach for the Kent State Golden Flashes. During the season, he helped the team secure their first bowl win against Utah State in the 2018 Frisco Bowl, beating the Aggies 51-41.

In 2019, Windham was promoted as the safeties coach.

=== South Alabama ===
On December 21, 2020, Windham was named as the linebackers coach at South Alabama, joining Kane Wommack's new coaching staff.

On December 27, 2023, Windham was one of four coaches let go from the coaching staff after the team won the 2023 68 Ventures Bowl. On January 24, 2024, Windham would be named as the linebackers coach for the Arkansas State Red Wolves. However, two days later on January 26, he was brought back by South Alabama and was promoted as the defensive coordinator and safeties coach.

=== Texas State ===
On January 21, 2026, Windham was named as the defensive coordinator and safeties coach for the Texas State Bobcats.
