= 2021 Peach Bowl =

The 2021 Peach Bowl may refer to:

- 2021 Peach Bowl (January) – a bowl game following the 2020 season, on January 1, 2021, between Georgia and Cincinnati
- 2021 Peach Bowl (December) – a bowl game following the 2021 season, on December 30, 2021, between Pittsburgh and Michigan State
