= 2016 Liberty Bowl =

2016 Liberty Bowl can refer to:

- 2016 Liberty Bowl (January), played as part of the 2015–16 college football bowl season between the Arkansas Razorbacks and the Kansas State Wildcats
- 2016 Liberty Bowl (December), played as part of the 2016–17 college football bowl season between the Georgia Bulldogs and the TCU Horned Frogs
