= Oakland Zoo (student section) =

Student cheering section of the University of Pittsburgh

The eleventh iteration of the logo that appears on the front of Oakland Zoo T-shirts for the 2012–13 season is shown. The logo incorporates elements from the University of Pittsburgh's seal.

The Oakland Zoo is the student cheering section for the University of Pittsburgh men's and women's basketball teams. The section cheers on the Panthers from the bottom tier of the stands at the Petersen Events Center, primarily across from the teams' benches and on the baselines under the baskets. The "Pete" holds a rowdy crowd of 1,500 students which are typically uniformly clad in gold t-shirts, and the Zoo student section is consistently sold out for Panthers home games. The Oakland Zoo is named after Oakland, the neighborhood in which the university is located. The name "Oakland Zoo" is used for the basketball cheering sections only; the football cheering section has often used the title, "The Panther Pitt."

== Notoriety ==
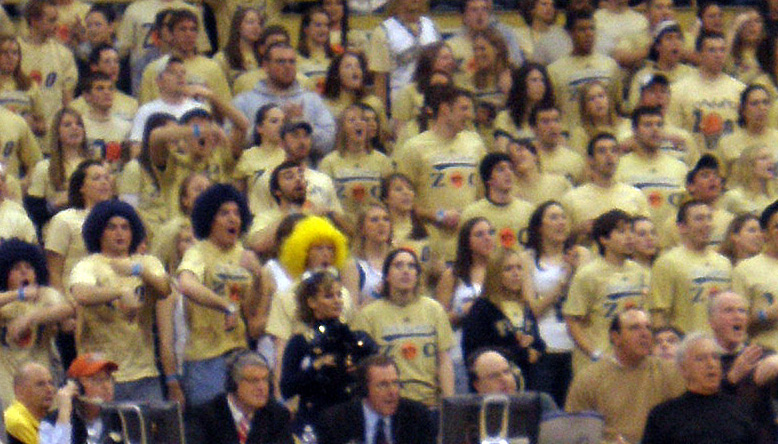
A small sampling of the Oakland Zoo in January 2008

The Oakland Zoo has been noted as being one of the most formidable student cheering sections in college basketball. It has been profiled in The Wall Street Journal, and has been featured on ESPN in various segments including ESPNU Campus Connection Week on January 19, 2009, ESPN Student Spirit Week on January 16, 2007, and ESPN "College GameDay" on January 13, 2007. According to an anonymous poll of league players published by Sports Illustrated, the Oakland Zoo has helped make the Petersen Events Center the "Toughest Place to Play" in the Big East Conference. Anonymous players in the article were quoted describing the Oakland Zoo: "The fans get there early to start heckling you. It's like a zoo." and "The student section is next to the court, and the fans there say some creative stuff." In 2013, the Petersen Events Center, with specific mention of the Oakland Zoo, was ranked as the nation's second best game atmosphere arena by USA Today. Some members of the Oakland Zoo have been known to wear body paint, wigs, masks, or animal-themed costumes including at various times, giraffes, moose, penguins, gorillas, and bears, among other species.

The Zoo has been lauded by many notable visitors to the Pete including Dallas Maverick's owner Mark Cuban and national college basketball pundits including Jay Bilas and Dick Vitale who have said it is "phenomenal" and one of the "top" college cheering sections giving Pittsburgh "tremendous home court advantage" with an atmosphere demonstrating "college hoops at its best". The Zoo was an instrumental member of the Inspiring Pitt Pride Committee that won recognition for the university as being one of five institutions which received the Division I-A Athletic Directors Association's "Sportsmanship Recognition Award" in 2006.

In 2011, Pitt debuted custom Nike Hyper Elite jerseys featuring an aerographic with the Oakland Zoo logo on the back. Pitt described this as the first NCAA basketball jersey to ever showcase their respective student section. In December 2011, ESPN's Eammonn Brennan and Dana O'Neil solicited feedback regarding the best student sections in all of NCAA Division I. They later listed their top-5 in a podcast discussion, naming the Oakland Zoo the second best in the nation, behind only Duke and the Cameron Crazies.

During the 2011–12 season, the Oakland Zoo, in collaboration with the university's student radio station WPTS-FM, created The Oakland Zoo Show. Broadcast live locally on WPTS and streamed over the internet, the radio show starts 30 minutes before every Pitt men's basketball home game and is cohosted by the entire Oakland Zoo student section. During the broadcast of the game that follows, game stoppages also include live check-ins with the Zoo.

Although credited by Pitt coaches, players and opponents alike for creating an intimidating atmosphere for visiting teams which has helped the men's team to a 13–1 record against visiting top 10 ranked teams (9-0 vs top 5), the Oakland Zoo has also been noted for its ability to impress football recruits during visits to Pitt basketball games. Elite high school running back prospect LeSean McCoy credited the Zoo's warm reception for him during a 2007 visit in helping to cement his decision to sign the University of Pittsburgh. Gateway High School linebacker, Shayne Hale, also credited the Zoo with his recruiting. Hale attended a game with high school teammate and friend Cameron Saddler. To the cheers of the Zoo, Hale put on a Zoo shirt and joined the Zoo for a portion of the game.

== History ==
The Oakland Zoo was independently formed by Pitt students in the winter of 2001. The initial idea for the Zoo came from Matt Cohen and Zack Hale along with Steve Bruno III, during the January 6, 2001 basketball game against Syracuse where they determined the Pitt student section was too calm. Cohen and Hale along with Bruno III, rounded up eight of their fellow students from the university's Litchfield Towers dormitory to initiate the club's first appearance at the January 13, 2001 victory over then 15th-ranked Seton Hall. The name "Zoo" was meant to represent "a bunch of kids in a zoo acting crazy" whereas "Oakland" is the neighborhood of Pittsburgh in which the university resides. Students adopted gold t-shirts and eventually grew to consume the majority of the student section at the team's home court then inside Fitzgerald Field House. Originally, upon seeking official sponsorship from the University for the 2001–2002 season, the group was denied and the athletic department attempted to implement their own counterpart to their football student cheering section called the "Aero-Zone", named after then athletic department apparel sponsor Aéropostale, and issued free t-shirts to the students emblazoned with this name. However, the "Aero-Zone" failed to catch on while the Oakland Zoo continued to grow, transitioning into the Petersen Events Center when it was opened in 2002 and filling the larger student section of the "Pete".

The group is an officially recognized student group of the university, and with over 3,000 members, is the largest such group. The Pitt Athletic Department works hand in hand with the Oakland Zoo, using the student leaders of the Oakland Zoo, otherwise known as the Zoo Keeper, as liaisons to the student body to make game experiences better. After Cohen and Bruno III, other Zoo Keepers/Zoo Presidents include: Andy Nagy (2005–2006), Ian Smith (2006–2007), David Jedlicka (2007–2009), Josh Frantz (2009–2010), Robert Hogan (2010–2011), Eric Haybarger (2011–2012), Joe Lassi (2012–2013), Jordan Shoup (2013–2014), Nick Brenner (2014–2015), Eric Floyd (2015–2016), Charlie Hansen (2016–2017), Madeleine Shelley (2017–2018), Hope Gast (2018–2020), Kyle Saxon (2021–2022), Austin Hogeboom (2022–2024), Richie Donato (2024–2025), and Emily McAdoo (2025-Present).

== Predecessors and noted fans ==
The history of specifically organized student sections and especially notable fans of the University of Pittsburgh basketball extend beyond the formation of the current iteration of the student cheering section named the Oakland Zoo.

=== Tiger Paul ===
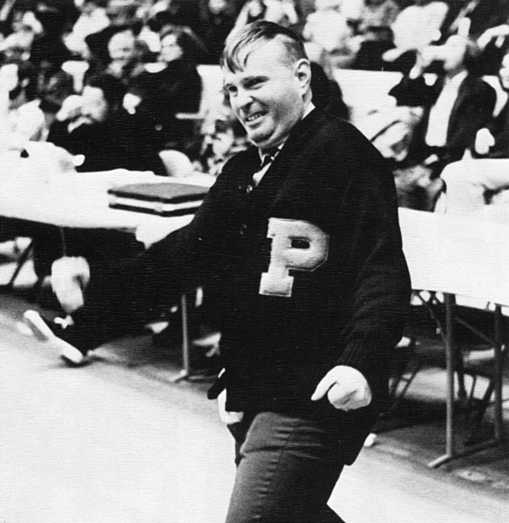
"Tiger" Paul Auslander, an unofficial cheerleader for Pitt basketball in the 1970s and early 80s, was well known by fans for his sideline antics. The picture was taken in 1974.

"Tiger" Paul Auslander served as an unofficial cheerleader at Pitt basketball games in the 1970s and early 1980s. At 5'4" and 181, the diminutive graduate of Peabody High School in Pittsburgh earned his nickname from his football coach who encouraged him to hit the blocking sled harder by instructing him to "Be a tiger!". After high school he also coached amateur basketball teams in the city and his enthusiasm on the sideline caught the attention of Pitt head coach Tim Grgurich who invited him to Fitzgerald Field House to liven up the crowd. Typically, his routine would involve dressing in outlandish outfits, sprint along the floor, and doing jumping jacks or push-ups. He was once ejected from a game at Temple University for arguing with an official. Auslander drifted away from the basketball scene in the early 1980s and eventually moved to Nevada where he died in 1992.

=== Panther Paul ===
A fan and season ticket holder of the Pitt men's basketball team, Paul Hipp entertained crowds from the late 1980s through the early 1990s. During intermissions and time-outs, Panther Paul got out of his seat and led the crowd in cheers with a fist pumping motion. His exuberant nature combined with short stature and portly appearance made him a fan favorite.

=== Field House Fanatics ===
In the late 1980s, the first organized band of students (made up mostly of the baseball team) pooled their efforts and formed the first student cheer group at the university. The Field House Fanatics, deriving their name from Fitzgerald Field House that was the former home facility used by the university's basketball team, sat in one section of bleachers on the baseline behind the basket. (closest to Pitt's bench) The opponents losses were recorded on tombstone like cutouts containing the losing team's name that were hung on a beam overhead of the section, a tradition revived by the Oakland Zoo during the 2008–09 season. T-shirts were made up for the Field House Fanatics, however they lacked the overall coordination and status as an official student group that the Oakland Zoo section enjoys. They creatively heckled opposing players and worked to distract them while shooting free-throws at the basket in front of the section, but the section slowly diminished in size and disappeared during a slump in basketball quality at Pitt during the mid to late 1990s.

=== Crazy Dancing Lady ===
During the Oakland Zoo era, another noted and passionate Pitt fan, Joyce Joynes Langston, often referred to as the "Crazy Dancing Lady", became known for her uninhibited dancing at Panther home basketball and football games. Her dancing antics resulted in her making frequent scoreboard appearances and she became a familiar sight at Pitt home games. Langston died on January 5, 2012.

== T-shirts and merchandising ==
Students in the section wear gold T-shirts with an "Oakland Zoo" logo, whose design is altered for each new season, printed on the front. In some iterations, the back of the shirt resembles a jersey, with the name "Panthers" printed above a large number 6, which stands for the "Sixth Man in the Stands," the fans. The designs for the 2004–05 to 2008–09 seasons were completed by Pitt graduate student and former Oakland Zoo President David Jedlicka, known as "the Bald Guy". Since the 2010–11, T-shirt logo designs have been by graphic designer Sean Montgomery and have incorporated various elements from the University of Pittsburgh's seal that itself includes a stylized version of the city of Pittsburgh's coat of arms that in turn is derived from the arms of the namesake of the city, William Pitt. On the backs of these recent t-shirts there is also a depiction of the university's Cathedral of Learning. Symbolizing the link between the basketball team and the student section, the image of the Cathedral of Learning on the back of the Zoo's t-shirts mimics the one found in the aerographic of the Nike game jerseys worn by the team, and likewise, the team's game jerseys' aerographic includes an Oakland Zoo logo in their design. The university's motto, logo, founding date, and various basketball imagery have also been recently incorporated into the t-shirt designs.

Oakland Zoo T-shirts are available for purchase by the general public in the University of Pittsburgh's Pitt Shop and other outlets. Other merchandise including pink ladies Oakland Zoo t-shirts, hoodies, and polo shirts are also available. In addition, the official team store sells limited edition plush animals outfitted with Oakland Zoo t-shirts. Individually numbered Oakland Zoo animals outfitted with 2006-2007 Oakland Zoo t-shirts that were produced in the first edition of the Oakland Zoo collection (with release date) included Corey the Giraffe (12–14–06), Romper the Monkey (1–7–2007), Francis the Polar Bear (1–27–2007), and Porter the Tiger (2–12–2007). The second edition of the Oakland Zoo collection with their release date are as follows: Cagney King of the Jungle (10–31–07), Corbin the Elephant (11–23–07), Hobart the Brown Bear (1–2–08), and Dandy the Duck (1–30–08). A third edition for 2008-09 includes the release of Kirby the Koala and Penelope the Penguin wearing Oakland Zoo VI t-shirts.

=== Legal issues ===
In 2003, Oakland Zoo founder Matt Cohen filed a trademark infringement suit, on behalf of the club, against a local t-shirt vendor Chuck Bonasorte. The Oakland Zoo wanted a percent of money for each t-shirt sold to be used to fund club related events for Zoo members. The judge ruled that there was no way to establish the trademark, and that Bonasorte's business, The Pittsburgh Stop, had been selling the shirts before the Zoo did. However, Bonasorte did agree to pay royalties to the Zoo. The "Oakland Zoo" trademark was later registered by the University of Pittsburgh.

== In-game activities ==
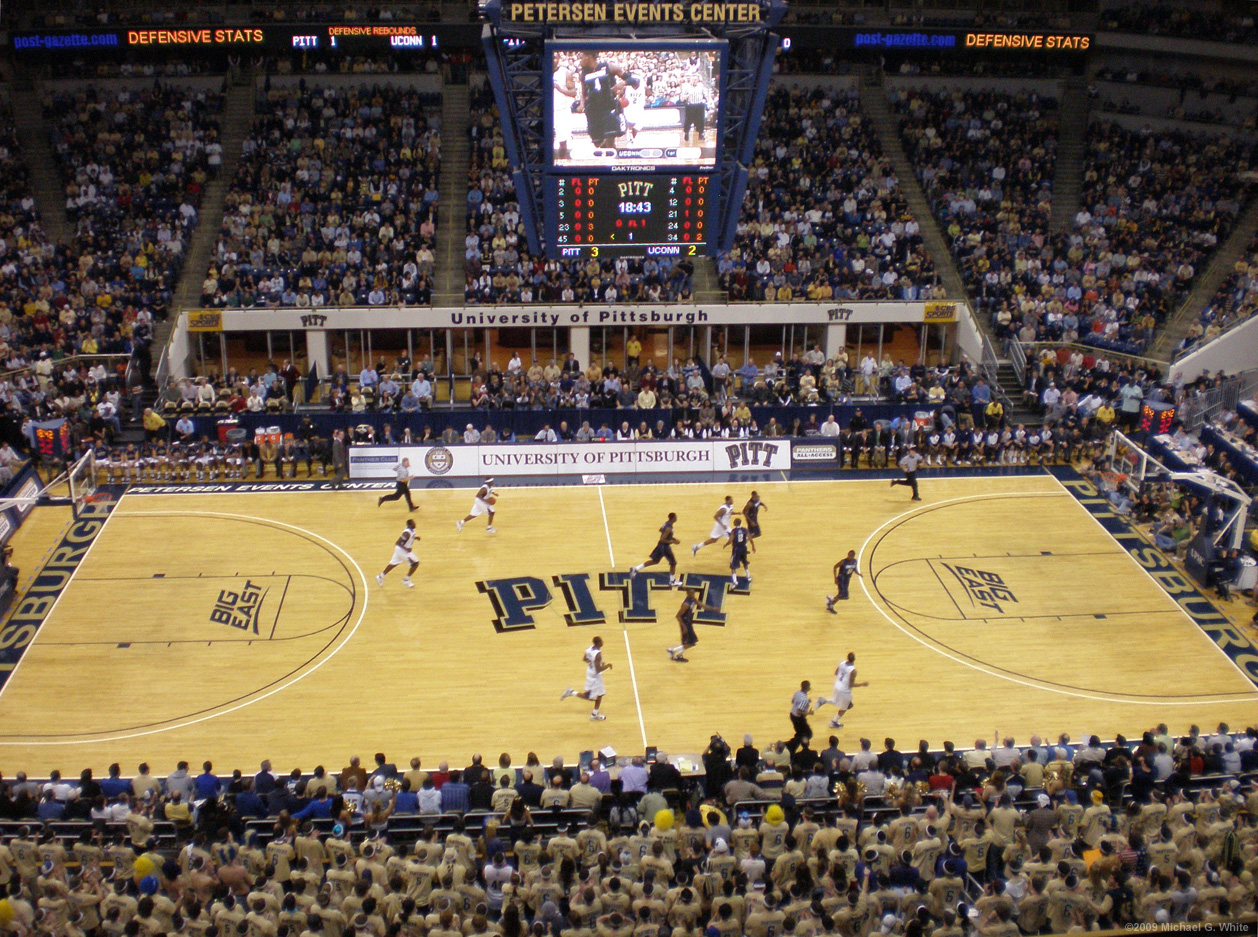
Pitt met #1 ranked UConn on March 7, 2009. As seen in the photo, the score is 1-1. Some of the Oakland Zoo are at the bottom of the picture. Pitt (ranked #3) won the nationally televised game 70–60.

Waiting times for the best seats in the Oakland Zoo section of the Petersen Events Center can extend for hours before the game's tip-off. For more high-profile games, Zoo members have camped overnight inside the large lobby of the Petersen Events Center, sometimes having pizza delivered to them by the basketball coaching staff.

The Oakland Zoo distributes four page newspapers prior to every home game with details on Pitt players and opponents. The student section uses these papers to mock the opposing team during player introductions for the opponent by feigning disinterest. Also during the introduction of visiting players, the section yells "Sucks!" after the name of each opposing player is introduced, implying that the opposing players are not very good. After the opposing coach is introduced, the section yells "He sucks too!" At the start of the introduction for Pitt players, the Zoo tosses their newspapers into the air. After the first point of the game is scored by Pitt, the Zoo throws the discarded papers which in the meantime have been ripped into pieces, into the air to create a shower of confetti.

During the playing of the national anthem, the Zoo members lock their arms around their neighbors shoulders in a sign of solidarity with the Pitt players who also lock arms during the national anthem. Panther Fans sing two fight songs during each game, the "Pitt Victory Song" and "Hail to Pitt". Oakland Zoo members are also known from dressing up, although some are known for their lack of dress and painted chests, with particular notoriety for costumes involving various animal themes including gorilla and bear costumes.

In 2006, the Oakland Zoo showed solidarity with the Duquesne University basketball team by wearing red ribbons to commemorate the five Duquesne basketball players who were shot earlier in the year. In 2008 the Oakland Zoo wore ribbons again, however this time it was for Pink the Pete. During the Pitt vs. UConn women's game, the Oakland Zoo distributed pink ribbons to everyone in attendance to show support for breast cancer awareness. The ribbons were similar to the 2006 ribbons, but this time had the Oakland Zoo logo printed on them. The tradition was continued with a different pink shirt for the annual Pink the Pete games against Cincinnati in 2009, against Louisville in 2010, and against Connecticut in 2012 .

During the 2008–09 and 2012–13 seasons, the Oakland Zoo revived the tradition, started with the Field House Fanatics, of hanging tombstones for each team defeated by the men's basketball team at the Petersen Events Center. For much of its history, communication between the Zoo leadership and the rest of the student section has been communicated by a whiteboard. In 2013, the university and the zoo collaborated so messages could be communicated to the entire Petersen Events Center via the main scoreboard.

== Student club ==
The Oakland Zoo functions as an officially recognized student club by the University of Pittsburgh with over 2,000 members. The group helps the athletic department in setting student ticket policy and was instrumental in bringing about a "loyalty points" program.

The Oakland Zoo also holds an annual pre-season event, hosted by the president of the organization. Food is served and talks are given by Pitt's men's and women's head basketball coaches. Meetings are announced via Twitter where members of the Oakland Zoo can come together and brainstorm on new ideas for the Zoo and upcoming opponents.

The Oakland Zoo has been involved in various student activities and charitable events throughout its history. The Zoo held its first annual 3v3 Charity Basketball Tournament on September 30, 2012. Games were held on the court in the Petersen Event Center, and all proceeds from both spectators and competitors were donated to Big Brothers Big Sisters of Greater Pittsburgh. The charity event raised over $4,000 in its first year.
