= Walter E. Aschaffenburg =

American composer

Walter E. Aschaffenburg (1927–2005) was a German-born American composer, who for most of his career taught composition at Oberlin Conservatory of Music. One commentator noted that he "employed the 12-tone system in some of his works, his scores are often embued with a meticulous expressivity." He regarded his greatest work as Bartleby, an opera with a libretto by Jay Leyda, based on the Herman Melville story, Bartleby, and premiered by Oberlin Music Theatre in 1964.

He was twice awarded John Simon Guggenheim Memorial Foundation Fellowships for Music Composition first in 1955, then again in 1973. He received the Cleveland Arts Prize, as well.

In 1987, he married the pianist and music performance professor Rayna Barroll (1930–2016).

== Education and early career ==
Aschaffenburg came to the United States with his family in 1938. and became a citizen in 1944. During the war he served in the United States Army. He began his formal study of music at the Hartford School of Music, taking his diploma in 1945. He then enrolled at Oberlin College, rather than Oberlin Conservatory, because he preferred a broad program. There he studied with Herbert Elwell. He graduated in 1951, then went on to the Eastman School of Music in Rochester, N.Y., receiving his M.A. in 1952. In the fall of that year he joined the faculty at Oberlin. In 1956, he received a Guggenheim Fellowship to Florence, Italy, where he studied with Luigi Dallapiccola, who was known for being the first Italian composer to adopt 12-note composing.

At Oberlin along with David Robertson, Richard Hoffmann, Joseph R. Wood initiated the conservatory major in composition in 1956. He became the head of the department of composition. He and his colleagues also established the Oberlin Contemporary Music Festival.

== Musical career ==
Aschaffenburg's colleague at the Oberlin Conservatory, Randolph Coleman, wrote that "Walter was a traditionalist—as a person, a pedagogue, and a composer." Accordingly, he "favored the historic formal structures of part forms, sonatas, and fugatos, preferring to work his creative juices through the filters of historically tried-and-true parameters rather than to trust willy-nilly improvisation or more recent methodologies that had not yet undergone the imprimatur of time's considerations." While some of his works used the 12-tone system, his music has been characterized as "often embued with a meticulous expressivity." Over his career he wrote some two dozen works.

He wrote extensively in many forms, though his most frequently performed piece is a fanfare written for the Cleveland Orchestra to perform as the Blossom Music Center, its summer home. Works for the orchestra ranged from early works such as "Oedipus Rex, overture" (1951) to his final "Oboe Concerto" (1985; 1987), but often wrote music for chamber instruments and piano. The Philadelphia Orchestra principal oboist praised the oboe concerto as "the most impressive contemporary work for the oboe," and it was recorded several times.

He also wrote for voice and opera. His miniature opera, "Libertatem Apellant" (1976), which used correspondence between John Adams and Thomas Jefferson, incorporated patriotic tunes and Stephen Foster songs. He regarded his greatest work as his 1964 opera based on the Herman Melville story, Bartleby. The New York Times mentioned Aschaffenburg as taking up the challenge of writing American opera. It noted that "difficult as the form is, dubious as the possibility of production and rewards are, opera still continues to attract the American composer." The libretto was written by Jay Leyda, and it was premiered by Oberlin Music Theatre in 1964.

Aschaffenburg's colleague, Randolph Coleman, wrote "he was a generous composition and music theory teacher for 40 years, one who gave unstintingly to those who would put forward a serious effort. His students include more than a dozen recognized composers.

== Selected works ==
In order of publication, not necessarily date of composition.

- Walter Aschaffenburg. Divertimento : For Trumpet, Horn, and Trombone. (New York: Circle Blue Print Co.). ISBN
- ---. Trio for Piano, Violin & Violoncello. (New York: Reproduced and bound by Independent Music Pub., 1950). ISBN
- ---, with Shepherd Arthur Lockwood Normand Humel Gerald Cumberworth Starling Cleveland Chamber Music Society. Cleveland Chamber Music Society Records., 1950). ISBN
- ---. Sonata for Solo Violin, Op. 8. ([Place of publication not identified]: [publisher not identified], 1954). ISBN
- ---. String Quartet, Op. 9. ([Place of publication not identified]: [publisher not identified], 1960). ISBN
- ---. Sonatina for Piano Solo, Op. 7., 1962). ISBN
- ---, Ozymandias : Symphonic Reflections for Orchestra. ([Rochester, N.Y.]: [Rochester Photo Copy], 1962). ISBN
- ---. Elegy : For Strings. (Oberlin, Ohio: W. Aschaffenburg, 1964). ISBN
- ---. Elegy for Strings; in Memoriam David Robertson, Op. 12., 1964). ISBN
- ---. Three Dances for Orchestra. (Bryn Mawr, Pa.: Theodore Presser Company, 1967). ISBN
- ---. Three Shakespeare Sonnets : For Tenor and Piano; Opus 14 (1966-67). ([United States]: [publisher not identified], 1967). ISBN
- ---. Quintet for Winds : (Flute, Oboe, Clarinet, Horn, Bassoon). (Hollywood: Cameo Music Papers, 1968). ISBN
- --- The 23rd Psalme : Tenor Solo, S.A.T.B., Oboe and Organ, Op. 13. (Bryn Mawr, Penn.: Theodore Presser, 1968). ISBN
- ---. Duo for Violin & Violoncello, Opus 18. ([Ohio?]: W. Aschaffenburg, 1971). ISBN
- ---. Three Dances for Orchestra. (Pennsylvania: Theodore Presser Company, 1972). ISBN
- ---. Three Dances, for Orchestra. [Op. 15]. (Bryn Mawr, Pa.: T. Presser Co., 1972). ISBN
- ---. Three Dances for Orchestra. (Bryn Mawr, Pa.: Theodore Presser Co., 1972). ISBN
- ---, "Conversations : Six Pieces for Piano : Op. 19," (1973): Hathis Trust
- ---,Libertatem Appellant : Being Excerpts from the Correspondence between John Adams & Thomas Jefferson : Opus 20, for Tenor and Baritone Soli and Full Orchestra., 1976). ISBN
- ---. Carrousel : 24 Little Pieces for Piano. ([U.S.]: [publisher not identified], 1982). ISBN
- ---. Concertino for Violin, Ten Winds and Contrabass, Op. 22 (1981). ([Place of publication not identified]: W. Aschaffenburg, 1983). ISBN
- ---, with Smith William Jay. . Laughing Time : For Mixed Chorus and Clown, Opus 24. ([Oberlin, Ohio]: Walter Aschaffenburg, 1983). ISBN
- ---. Concerto for Oboe and Orchestra, Op. 25. ([Place of publication not identified]: W. Aschaffenburg, 1986). ISBN
- ---. From South Mountain : For Brass Quintet. ([Place of publication not identified] (1988). ISBN
- ---. Sonata for the Foretepiano or Pianoforte. ([Place of publication not identified]: [W. Aschaffenburg], 1990). ISBN
- ---. Coalescence : For Oboe and Violoncello. ([Phoenix]: [W. Aschaffenburg], 1990). ISBN
- ---. Parings : Four Pieces for Clarinet and Piano. ([United States]: W. Aschaffenburg, 1993). ISBN
- ---, Zuyeva Elizaveta London Edwin Aschaffenburg Walter Miller Edward J. London Edwin Recorded Anthology of American Music Inc Dram Gosudarstvennaia Akademicheskaia Simfonicheskaia Kapella Rossii, "A Hero of Our Time," (2007): A Hero of our Time: Works by Aschaffenberg/Miller/London
- ---, with Chandler Theo Concerto for Oboe and Orchestra, Opus 25 (1985)., 2013). ISBN
