= University of Pittsburgh Alma Mater =

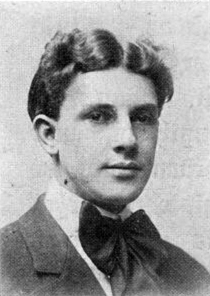
George M.P. Baird (1909) served as the editor in chief of the student yearbook and penned the lyrics to Pitt's Alma Mater

The alma mater of the University of Pittsburgh was adopted soon after the university changed its name in 1908 from the Western University of Pennsylvania to its current moniker. Lyrics were written by George M. P. Baird, class of 1909 and were set to the tune of what was then the Austrian National Anthem (adopted as the German National Anthem in 1922). A new tune for the "Alma Mater" hymn was composed by Charles W. Scovel, class of 1883, but it was not widely adopted and was either lost or became obscure.

== Use and recordings ==
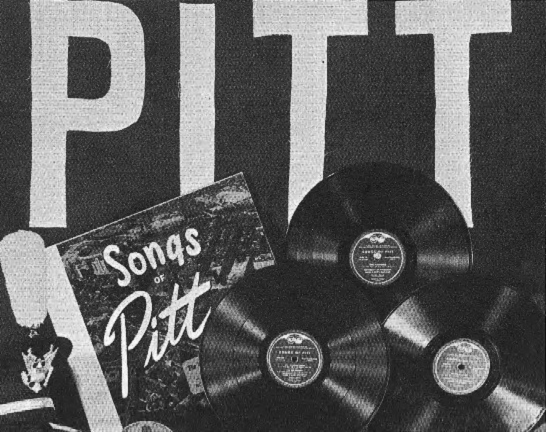
In the early 1950s, the Pitt Band and the Pitt Men's Glee Club cooperated with the RCA Victor recording company to release a compilation of Pitt songs entitled Songs of Pitt

The "Alma Mater" acts as an official anthem of the university and often is played to open and/or close various University functions, including athletic contests such as football and basketball games. It is more formal than the traditional fight songs such as "Hail to Pitt" and the "Victory Song", and is typically played and sung in a more reverent fashion than other university songs.

One of the first professional recordings of "Alma Mater", along with "Hail to Pitt", was by the Criterion Quartet on Gennett Records in 1920 During the 1940s, Joseph Wood conducted a recording of a collection of songs entitled Songs of the University of Pittsburgh that featured Walter Scheff, Ralph Nyland, and Michael Stewart. Released on two 78-rpm discs by Republic records, the album featured "Pitt Alma Mater", "Hail to Pitt", "The Panther", and the "Pitt Victory Song". Various compilations by the Pitt Band and Pitt Men's Glee Club have also been produced that have included the "Alma Mater". Around the 1952–1953 school year, the Pitt Band and the Pitt Men's Glee Club collaborated to release a compilation songs entitled Songs of Pitt on RCA Victor Records. More recent compilations included two versions of the "Alma Mater" in a 1987 three record set entitled Proud Traditions on the Europadisk Ltd. label that celebrated the bicentennial of Pitt's founding, Pitt Spirit released on audio cassette in 1989, Proudly Pittsburgh in 1997, and in the late 2000s Pitt Pride! and Panther Fans...Are You Ready? on compact disc. Today, the Pitt's "Alma Mater" is available for purchase in a variety of formats including compact discs, MP3s, and ringtones.

== Lyrics ==
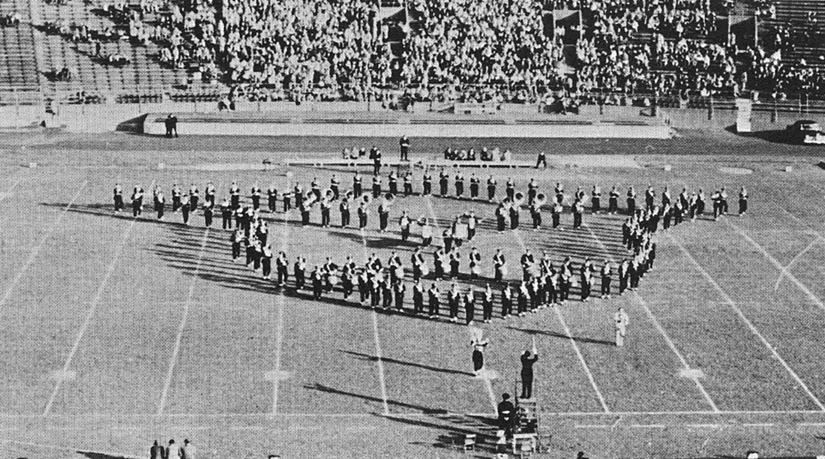
During the 1950s, the Pitt Band, shown here during the 1952 Pitt football season, would close halftime shows playing the "Alma Mater" in the Panther Head formation

The lyrics to the University of Pittsburgh Alma Mater are attributable to the 1916 edition of The Owl student yearbook. The song is to be sung con spirito (as a triumphant anthem, not as a dirge). It comprises three verses, the first of which is sometimes repeated after the third.

=== First stanza ===
In some printings of the Alma Mater, the first verse are repeated at the end of the song. This first stanza is the most commonly performed portion of the song and is typically played or sung at formal and informal university events.

Alma Mater, wise and glorious,
Child of Light and Bride of Truth,
Over fate and foe victorious,
Dowered with eternal youth,
Crowned with love of son and daughter,
Thou shalt conquer as of yore,
Dear old Pittsburgh, Alma Mater,
God preserve Thee evermore!

=== Second stanza ===
The lyrics of the second stanza refer to the geographical location of the university in Pittsburgh and that city's role in the early nation as the "Gateway to the West". "First beyond the mountains founded" refers to the fact that the University of Pittsburgh is the oldest continuously chartered institution of learning in the U.S., west of the Allegheny Mountains. The verse stating "twin rivers forest bounded, Merge and journey toward the sea" refers to the confluence of the Allegheny River from the northeast and Monongahela River from the southeast to form the Ohio River which eventually merges into the Mississippi River that runs in the Gulf of Mexico. The "dawning of the nation" refers to the cities establishment as a fort and trading post prior to the American Revolution and the founding of the school in 1787, just before the beginning of the Constitutional Convention, and to the "rough-hewn habitation" refers to the mostly log and wooden structures that made up the early city at this time, including the school's own origins in a log cabin.

First beyond the mountains founded,
Where the West-road opens free,
When twin rivers forest bounded,
Merge and journey toward the sea,
In the dawning of the nation
Ere the clouds of strife had cleared,
'Rose Thy rough-hewn habitation,
By our prophet fathers reared.

=== Third stanza ===
In the third stanza, "All who gather at Thy knee, Castes and classes, creeds and races, Mother, are as one to Thee" references the long history of diversity in the university's student body as the first African-American student attended the school in 1829 and the first women in 1895. "Gold and Blue" refer to the school's colors, which were chosen sometime prior to the twentieth century when the university was known as the Western University of Pennsylvania.

Close Thy mother-love embraces
All who gather at Thy knee,
Castes and classes, creeds and races,
Mother, are as one to Thee;
Thou who unto knowledge bore us,
In the good old days long gone,
Raise Thy Gold and Blue high o'er us,
Land and we will follow on.

== Music ==
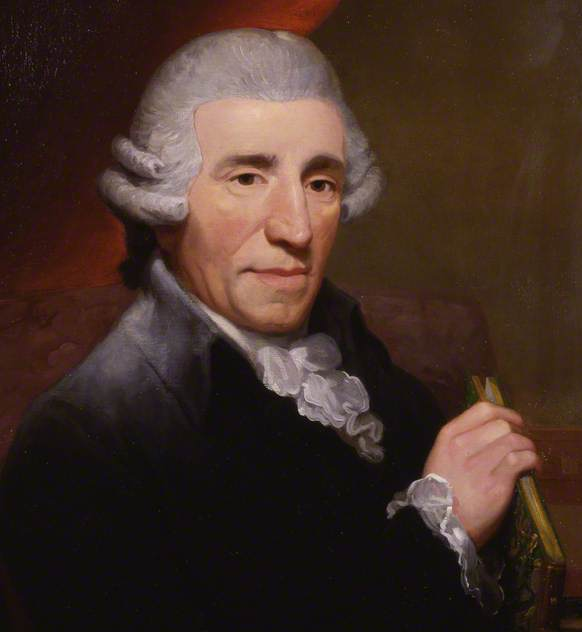
Joseph Haydn's music for "Gott erhalte Franz den Kaiser" has been adopted for several anthems. Pitt's Alma Mater was set to it at least six years prior to it being adopted as the German National Anthem in 1922

The official alma mater of the University of Pittsburgh is set to the tune of Joseph Haydn's 1797 music for "Gott erhalte Franz den Kaiser" ("God save Francis the Emperor") and was used as the official anthem of the Austrian emperor until the end of the monarchy in 1918. Haydn also used the tune in the second movement of one of his string quartets, the "Kaiserquartett". It was adopted as the music for the German national anthem, "Das Deutschlandlied", in 1922 during the time of the Weimar Republic and is still used as the German national anthem today. The tune is also used in the English-speaking world as a hymn tune, often used for the hymn "Glorious Things of Thee are Spoken" by John Newton. In this context, the tune is called "Austria", "Austrian Hymn", or "Emperor's Hymn" The tune is also used for the hymn "Not Alone for Mighty Empire" by William P. Merrill.

== Western University of Pennsylvania ==
Prior to 1908, the university was known as the Western University of Pennsylvania (W.U.P.), which was often termed "Wup" for short. The lyrics for the Alma Mater for W.U.P., per the 1907 The Owl student yearbook, are below. The references to the old name of the school in every stanza of the song suggest that, upon the university taking the name of the University of Pittsburgh in 1908, that a desire grew to replace it with a new Alma Mater.

ALMA MATER
I.
Have you heard the glad refrain?
We will sing it once again,
Singing for Western Pennsylvania.
With our loyal comrades true
We will cheer the gold and blue,
Cheering for Western Pennsylvania.

Chorus.
Hail, Alma Mater,
Thy sons cheer thee now,
To thee, W-U-P,
All foemen must bow;
Victorious forever
They colors shall be,
And ever shall wave in victory

Campus of the Western University of Pennsylvania, the prior name of the University of Pittsburgh, on what is now Pittsburgh's North Side before the move of the university to the Oakland section of Pittsburgh in 1909

II.
Every morn our colors rise
In the blue and golden skies,
Shining for Western Pennsylvania,
And the love in every soul
Brings us nearer to the goal-
Vict'ry for Western Pennsylvania

III.
Every man shall play his part;
Each hath love within his heart,
Love for old Western Pennsylvania
Dear old Wup shall never fear
While a thousand voices cheer,
Cheer for old Western Pennsylvania.

IV.
Let the echo then resound
With the joyous gladsome sound,
Singing for Western Pennsylvania
Loyalty each breast shall sway,
Hand and heart shall meet to-day,
Cheering for Western Pennsylvania.

Chant.
Western Pennsylvania,
All Hail to thee;
Ever beloved
They name shall be.
Honored in memory
Thy name we hold;
Ever revering
The Blue and Gold-
Amen.

== Alma Mater chants ==
Various lyrics, poems, or chants under the heading or title of "Alma Mater" have appeared throughout the years in various student and school publications. The pervasiveness and use of these lyrics throughout the university is generally unknown.

=== A Chant ===
The following uncredited Alma Mater: A Chant appeared in front of the 1911 The Owl student yearbook. Published by the junior class, the yearbook chronicles only the second school year in which the university was first known as the University of Pittsburgh following its name change from the Western University of Pennsylvania. Unknown is whether this chant served as a predecessor or candidate Alma Mater for the university.

The lyrics of the chant represent an appreciation for the struggles endured during throughout the history of the university, which had recently moved to a new location in the Oakland section of Pittsburgh. This is reflected in the theme of that year's Owl, who was dedicated to "The Builders of the University." Specifically referenced in the third stanza are references to two fires in the university's history: the Great Fire of 1845 that wiped out 20 square blocks of the most valuable part of Pittsburgh and the subsequent fire only four years later in 1849 that destroyed the university and forced a suspension of its operations while it regrouped and rebuilt.

Alma Mater

A Chant

Up from the heart of things Thou hast risen, my beautiful mother,
Born with the nation, in strife of Freedom's travail and tears,
Formed of the new-world stuff and breath of the great Primeval,
Strong in the valiant thews and the heart of the Pioneers.

Blessed are they of old appointed by God for thy keeping,
Men of the larger life, world-sculptors, captains, seers
Of the time to be, in thy wilderness birth forseeing
Fruits of this perfect tree, glory of coming years.

Up, through sorrow and toil Thou hast struggled, my beautiful mother,
Life wars, lures of the dust, pangs of becoming, flashes
Of world-hate conquered and broken, twice purged by refining fires
Phoenix-like, dowered with truth, Thou hast risen in strength from the ashes.

Loyal are they and true, the sons of thy blest begetting,
Proud with a son's just pride, loving, swift to defend,
Doing God's work and thine in the fields of the world forever
Till the hand of the sower be stayed and the song of the reaper shall end.

White on thy mountain top thou shinest, my beautiful mother,
Tented by sapphire skies and cloudbergs fashioned in gold,
Gazing with thoughtful eyes o'er the vale to the world's last border
Where the battle of Being is red and the new life wars with the old.

Potent and wise are they who trim thy torch for the burning,
Consecrate priests of the truth, masters of lore and deed,
Pouring the miracle cruse that richer grows with the pouring,
Making the base things high, sowing the perfect seed.

Rise, for thy triumph is come, O my glorious mother,
And my city, forsaking her worship of riches and power,
Shall leap from her grime and her gold, at Thy bidding stand
Inspired, a sister of might in thy conquering hour.

=== A Chant for Unwreathed Victory ===
A chant, entitled Alma Mater, appeared in the 1914 Owl student yearbook and may have been a candidate to become, or a predecessor of, the current University of Pittsburgh Alma Mater that first appeared in the 1916 Owl. The author, who may have been Baird, was credited simply as "B.-'09", and although no mention was made of possible accompanying music, the Owl contained the following lyrics.

Alma Mater
A Chant for Unwreathed Victory

————

O Thou, who tread'st, with valiant feet,
The rugged road of hostile years,
Whose lot hath been the glean-ed ears
Snatched from a world of garnered wheat,
O hungered tender of the vine
Wright of unguerdoned husbandry,
O thirst-irked treaderout of wine
Red crushed for others' revelry,
Wreathed in new song, I bring to Thee
The love of those whose hearts are thine.

Upon they hip the sword of might,
In thy firm hand the torch of truth,
Thy cheeks flushed with eternal youth
Thy sapphire eyes thought-starred with light;
Strong limbed and goddess molded, free,
Aureant armored, laurel crowned,
And 'neath thy fountain brests close bound
With cinctures of self mastery
Hear thou the song we sing for Thee
In whose fair strength our hope is found.

O Thou, who from reluctant dust
Mingled with labor's sweat and tears, —
Strong in a faith that knows no fears,—
'Gainst scourge of flame and jealous thrust
Hast reared Thy pillared citadel;
O keeper of the sacred fire,
O warder of Pirene's well
O pioneer of hearts' desire,
On in they triumph mounting higher
To thunderous song no storm can quell.

Thy faith mocks our inconstancy,
Thy lavish palms, our avarice,
Thou giv'st beyond great rubies' price,
A niggard alms we grudge to Thee;
We buy world-laughter and reproach
In love of show and civic guad,
For alien brows Thy cruse we broach,
Thy wealth we squander far abroad;
How long shall scorn and churlish pence
Be bartered for thine opulence?

God help thy loyal sons to plead
Thy righteous cause till men shall rise
To aid Thee in thy high emprise
And guard thee in thine hour of need;
God rear thy temples on the height,
Loosen thy burdens, set them free.
God give thee champions to fight
The winning fight for truth and thee.
God give thee faith to keep aright
Thine upwards path of destiny.

== See also ==
- Hail to Pitt
- Pitt Victory Song
- Pitt Band
- University of Pittsburgh
- German National Anthem
