= Pitt Men's Glee Club =

Choir based in Pennsylvania, US

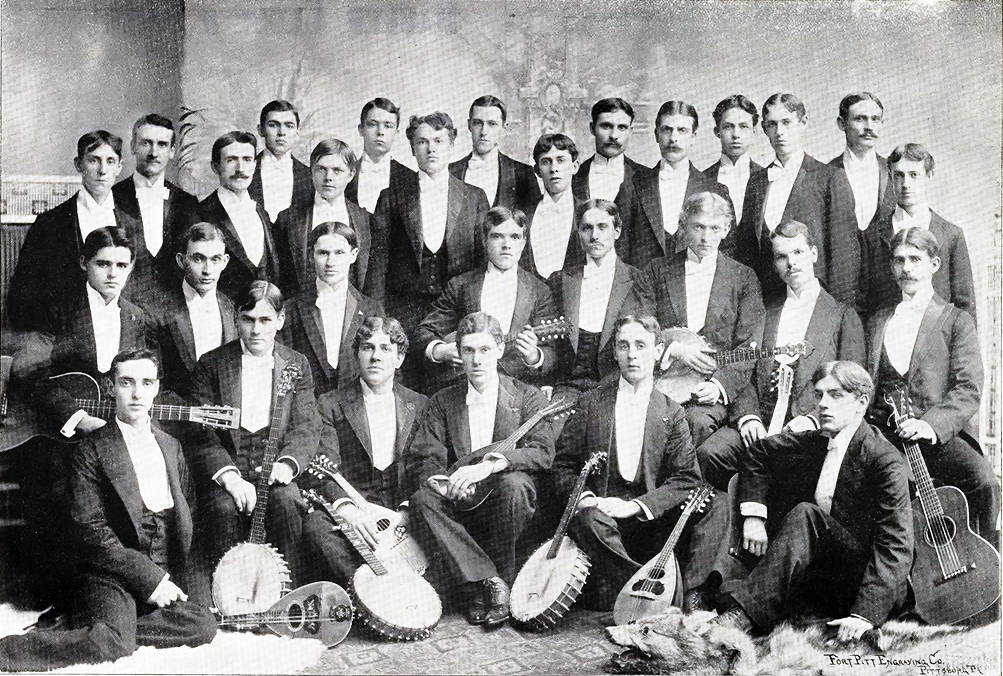
The university's Glee Club in 1894

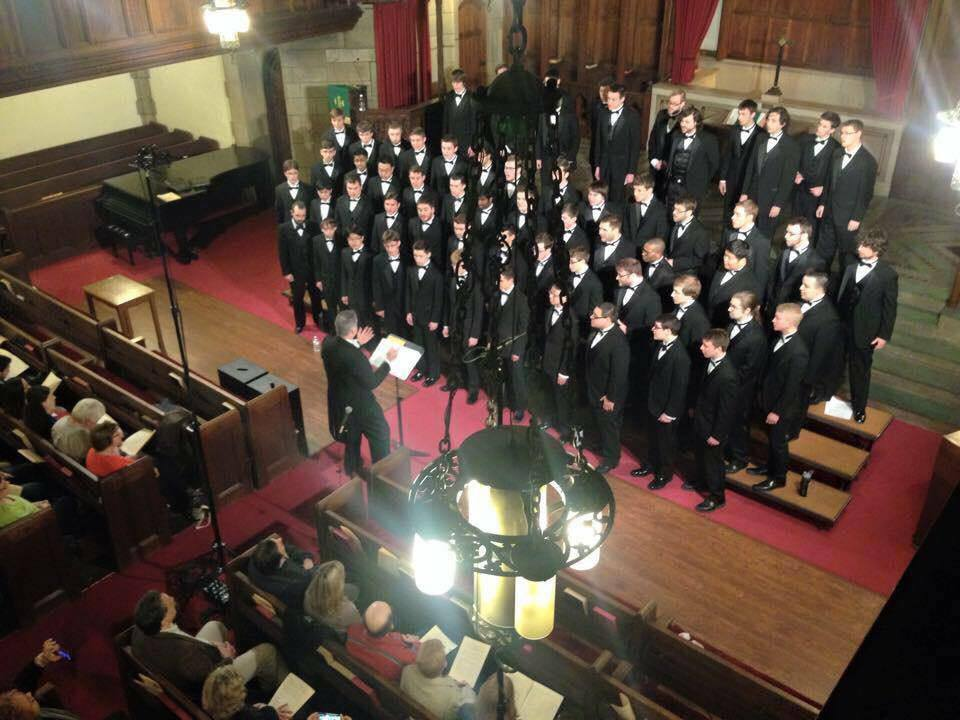
The 2014–2015 Pitt Men's Glee Club in concert

The University of Pittsburgh Men's Glee Club (also known as the Pitt Men's Glee Club or PMGC) is an internationally recognized men's choir of students at the University of Pittsburgh and is the oldest nonathletic extracurricular group at the university. Founded in 1890 by John L. High, the Glee Club performs at the First Baptist Church of Pittsburgh and normally goes on a concert tour each year, with an international tour every 3rd year. Recently, the Glee Club has performed in areas such as Texas, Philadelphia, New York City, Belgium, France, and a recent 125th anniversary tour of Italy in the spring of 2015.

As of 2024, the club's director is Richard Teaster, who has led the group and its subset, the Pantherhythms, since 1999. The current elected-board of the group for 2025-2026 is Anthony Arshoun (President), Jacob Klinedinst (Vice President), Sam Gonzales-Trelles (Secretary) Luke Sandusky (Business Manager) and Henry Leavitt (Social and Outreach Chair).

== Pantherhythms ==
The Glee Club also has a small subset called the Pantherhythms that meets once a week. Traditionally, it consists of 16 members (4 of each voice part) and performs additional repertoire during Glee Club concerts. The Pantherhythms perform additional concerts as well, including small performances for the chancellor of the university and at sports events. In November 2015, the group held its first-ever solo concert at Heinz Memorial Chapel.

== Recordings ==
Edited recordings of performances from Spring 2009 to Spring 2024 can be found on the Pitt Men's Glee Club YouTube Channel.

- A Musical Tradition, 2008
- A Gleeful Christmas, 2008
- Lux: A Collection of Sacred Songs and Spirituals, 2011
- Cherubini's Requiem in D Minor, 2013
- Brothers in Song, 2015

== See also ==
- List of collegiate glee clubs
- University of Pittsburgh
- Hail to Pitt, The University of Pittsburgh's Fight Song.
- University of Pittsburgh Alma Mater, often sung at the beginning or conclusion of PMGC's Concerts.
