= Jack R. Anderson =

Former Director of the University of Pittsburgh Varsity Marching Band

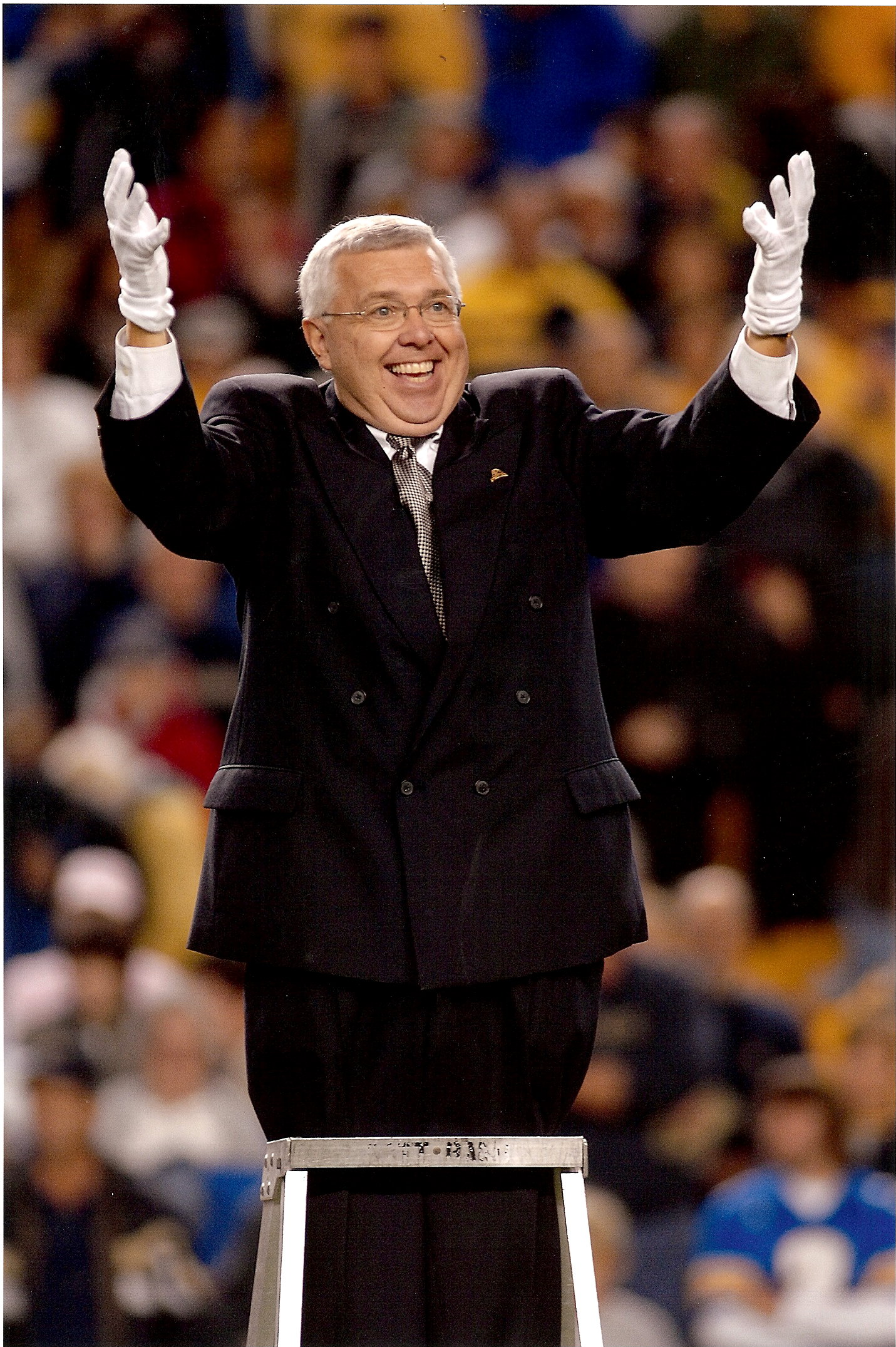
Jack R. Anderson

Jack R. Anderson (born 1947) is a former Director of Bands at the University of Pittsburgh, serving in the role from 1995 to 2013. Before his time as director, he had served as assistant director since 1986. His responsibilities included directing Pitt's Varsity Marching Band, leading the Pep Band, and conducting the Symphonic Band. As a music educator in Pennsylvania for 37 years, including serving as Director of the award winning Keystone Oaks High School Marching Band, he has served as a guest conductor and adjudicator for PMEA throughout Western Pennsylvania.

== University education ==
Jack played in the Pitt Band in the late 1960s and early 1970s. He holds a Bachelor of Arts degree from the University of Pittsburgh and a Master’s of Education degree from Edinboro University of Pennsylvania.

== Membership ==
Anderson is a member of many professional organizations including the College Band Directors National Association, Big East Band Directors Association, Music Educators National Conference, Pennsylvania Music Educators Association, and the following honoraries: Omicron Delta Kappa, Kappa Kappa Psi, Tau Beta Sigma, Mu Kappa Upsilon, and Iota Beta Kappa.

== Distinguishments ==
In 2007, Anderson was awarded the Distinguished Service to Music Medal for marching band, the highest national award presented by Kappa Kappa Psi, National Honorary Band Fraternity. He also was awarded the “Professor of the Year Award” in 2006 and 2007 for outstanding teaching from Pitt’s Fraternity and Sorority Life, a part of the Division of Student Affairs. In addition to these prestigious awards, he has received the Paula Crider Outstanding Band Director Award, presented annually by Tau Beta Sigma, National Honorary Band Sorority, to a college band or university band director who distinguishes himself in the field of university bands; “Outstanding Leader on Campus Award,” presented by the Student Government Board at Pitt; and a “Special Recognition Award,” given by the Mon Valley Chapter of the Panther Club for his dedicated service to Pitt athletics.

== Personal life ==
Jack and his wife Peggy met while Pitt undergraduates. They have two daughters, Katie Culp and Carrie Fisher, both alumni of the Pitt Band.
