= Herbert Elwell =

American composer and music critic

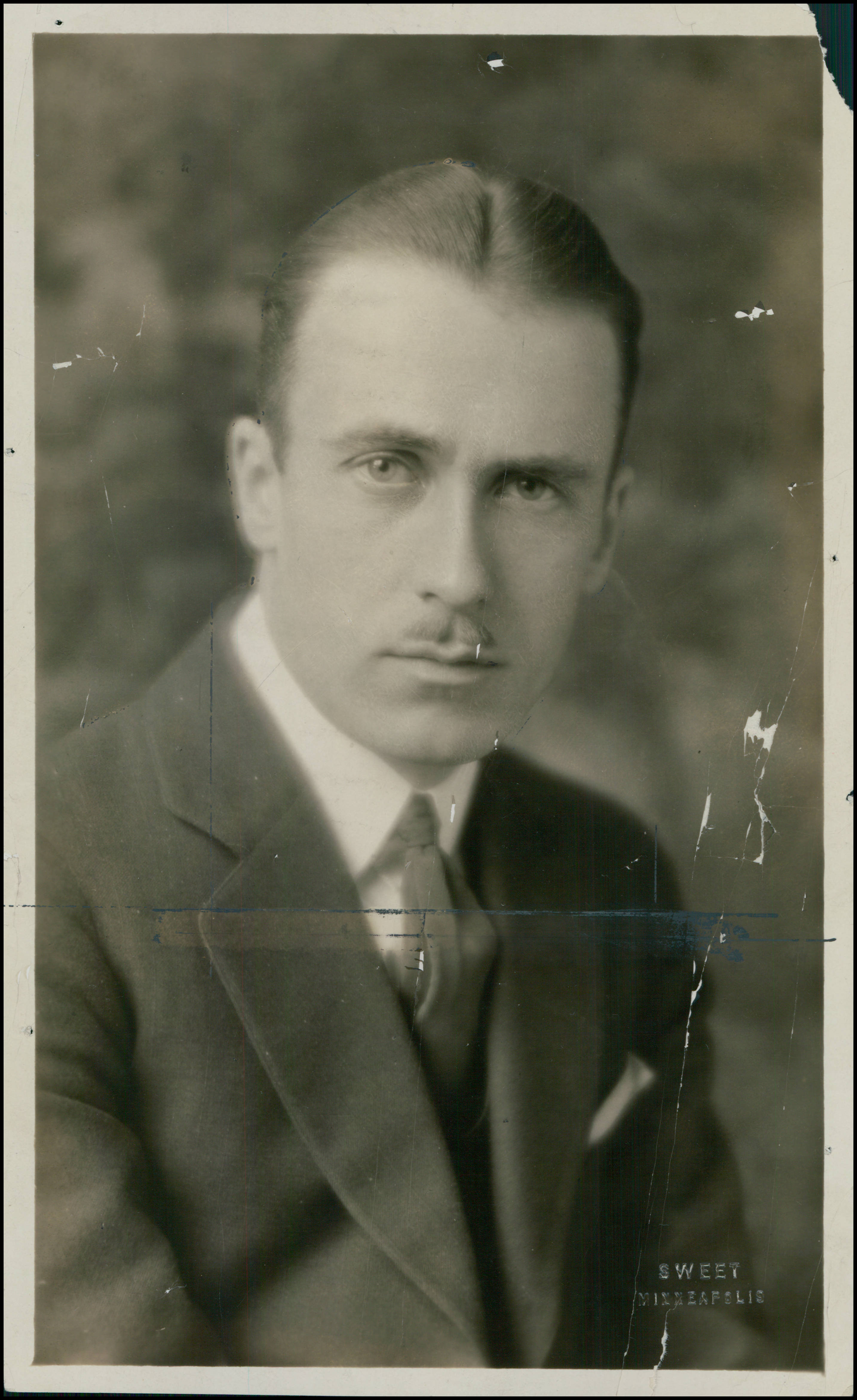

Background information
- Born: May 10, 1898
- Origin: United States
- Died: April 17, 1974 (aged 75)
- Occupations: Composer and Music critic

Herbert Elwell (May 10, 1898 – April 17, 1974) was an American composer and music critic. A native of Minneapolis, he was (with Aaron Copland and Virgil Thomson) among the first Americans to study in France with Nadia Boulanger. While in Paris his Quintet for Piano and Strings (1924) garnered more praise than George Gershwin's Rhapsody in Blue, which was premiered at the same concert. He began his studies in music at the University of Minnesota, and went on to work with Ernest Bloch prior to his sojourn in France. He also attended the American Academy in Rome during which time he composed his most frequently performed work, the ballet The Happy Hypocrite (1925).

In 1928 Elwell moved to Cleveland, Ohio to join the composition and music theory faculty at the Cleveland Institute of Music where he remained until 1945. He later taught at the Oberlin Conservatory of Music for nine years and spent summers teaching at the Eastman School of Music. Some of his notable pupils include Bain Murray, Walter Aschaffenburg, and Howard Whittaker. He also served as the music critic for The Plain Dealer for 32 years (from 1932 to 1964).

As a composer, Elwell wrote a considerable body of chamber music and vocal music. Many of his vocal pieces were written for soprano Marie Simmelink Kraft. He also composed a number of orchestral works which were extolled by such conductors as Artur Rodzinski, Leopold Stokowski, William Steinberg and Howard Hanson. In 1961 he was awarded the first Cleveland Arts Prize for Music. His other accolades include the Paderewski Prize, the Marjorie Peabody Waite Award from the National Institute of Arts and Letters, and honorary doctorates from the University of Rochester and Western Reserve University.
