= Pitt Victory Song =

Flight song

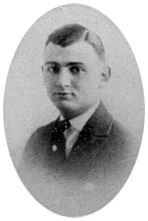
Benjamin Levant composed the music for the "Victory Song"

The "Pitt Victory Song", one of the most popular and widely used fight songs of the University of Pittsburgh, is often played in conjunction with "Hail to Pitt" and the "Panther Song". It was originally written by former to students of the university in order to solve the issue of the university not owning the copyright to "Hail to Pitt" which prevented the school from granting permission for its use during football radio broadcasts. Lyrics were written by G. Norman Reis (Col. 1916) and Louis M. Fushan (Econ. 1923). Music was written by Benjamin Levant (Col. 1919, Med. 1921). The song debuted in the Cap and Gown Club's 1938 musical production entitled Pickets, Please! Although commonly performed at university events, few people today know the rarely heard first portion of the song that occurs before the chorus. However, the most common cheer that is used during Pitt-related events and athletic contests is "Let's go Pitt!", which while perhaps derived from the song's lyrics, is often cheered even in absence of the song or music.

== Recordings ==
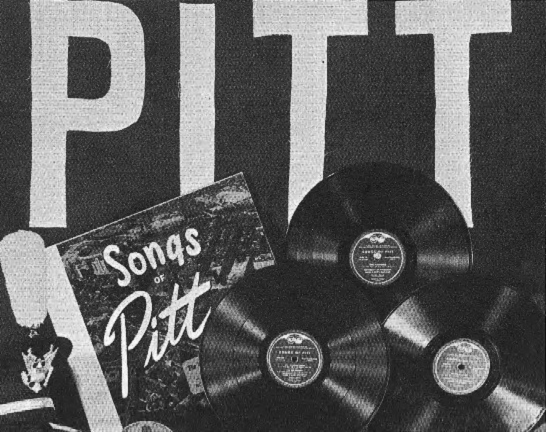
In the early 1950s, the Pitt Band and the Pitt Men's Glee Club cooperated with the RCA Victor recording company to release a compilation of Pitt songs entitled Songs of Pitt

During the 1940s, Joseph Wood conducted a recording of a collection of songs entitled Songs of the University of Pittsburgh that featured Walter Scheff, Ralph Nyland, and Michael Stewart. Released on two 78-rpm discs by Republic records, the album featured the "Pitt Victory Song", as well as "Hail to Pitt", "The Panther", and the "Pitt Alma Mater". Various compilations by the Pitt Band and Pitt Men's Glee Club have also been produced that have included the "Victory Song". Around the 1952–1953 school year, the Pitt Band and the Pitt Men's Glee Club collaborated to release a compilation songs entitled Songs of Pitt on RCA Victor Records. A limited edition box entitled Proud Traditions A Musical Tribute to Pitt was released for Pitt's bicentennial in 1987 on the Europadisk Ltd. label and included a booklet and three 12-inch vinyl records that included a recording of the "Victory Song". More recent compilations include "Pitt Spirit" released on audio cassette in 1989, Proudly Pittsburgh in 1997, and in the late 2000s "Pitt Pride!" and "Panther Fans...Are You Ready?" on compact disc. The "Victory Song" is also included on Gameday Faves: Classic College Fight Songs Volume 8.

The "Victory Song" has been a part of various compilations including a collection entitled Songs of the University of Pittsburgh in 1929 by the Thornton W. Allen Company of New York, as well as in Young's Everybody's favorite songs of the American colleges published in 1938.

== Lyrics ==
The lyrics specifically reference and focuses on football. This reinforces the attention on, and popularity of, the university's football team at the time of its writing.

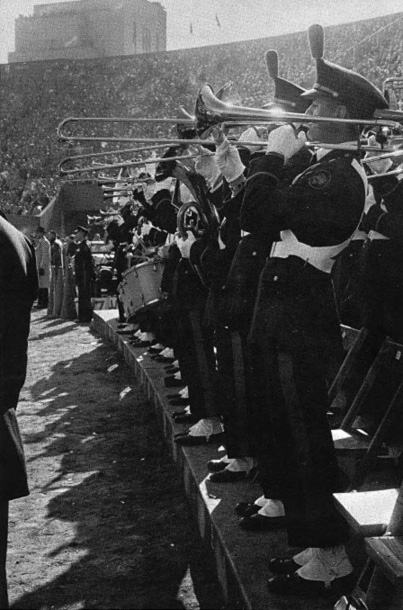
The Pitt Band plays the "Victory Song" at the end of a 26–13 win over Notre Dame at Pitt Stadium during the 1956 Pitt football season

Some printings of the lyrics record the version "It may be tough, The going rough, But always fighting fair" - which reverses the order of the words "rough" and "tough"

=== Controversy with unofficial lyrics ===
For most of the history of Pittsburgh Panthers athletic programs, a major rivalry has been with the Penn State Nittany Lions, especially in football. During the 1970s and 1980s, the rivalry was especially intense, with the two schools' football teams often competing for the national championship along with state supremacy. During this period, words to the final portion of the song containing the bridge were substituted by students.

The popularity of the use of these alternative lyrics carried over to when the fight song was used even during contests when Penn State was not the opponent, including other sporting events such as basketball. However some administrators at the university, including athletic director Steve Pederson, thought that the language was undignified, especially in light of the fact that many of the athletic contests where the chant could be heard were broadcast on regional and national television. Beginning with the 2001–2002 school year, the university administration, without announcement, mandated the Pitt Band to stop playing the portion of the song with the objectionable student-substituted lyrics. The elimination of the verse was intended to clean up the sportsmanship of the song, especially in light of controversial suspension of the football series, and to center cheers strictly on Pitt, but it was not met without controversy. The altered version without the final bridge remains the version played by the Pitt Band to this day. However, the bridge was still played as part of the Victory Chorale until 2015 where it was removed completely.

== See also ==
- "Hail to Pitt"
- University of Pittsburgh Alma Mater
- Pitt Band
- Pitt Athletics
- Pitt football
- Pitt basketball
- University of Pittsburgh
