= University of Pittsburgh Varsity Marching Band =

College marching band in Pittsburgh, Pennsylvania

- Nickname: Pitt Band
- School: University of Pittsburgh
- Location: Pittsburgh, Pennsylvania
- Conference: ACC
- Founded: 14 October 1911; 115 years ago
- Director: Dr. Brad Townsend
- Assistant Director: Mr. Michael Buckstein
- Members: 266
- Fight song: "Hail to Pitt"
- Website: www.pittband.com

The University of Pittsburgh Varsity Marching Band, or Pitt Band, is the college marching band at the University of Pittsburgh. The band numbers around 300 students consisting of instrumentalists, a majorette squad known as the Golden Girls, a color guard, and the drumline. The band was founded in 1911 and has won numerous awards over the years. All members of the band must pass an audition in order to join. The band is currently housed in Trees Hall; however, in 2020, the Pitt Athletic Department announced its "Victory Heights" initiative, part of the campus master plan which includes a new marching band facility slated to open in spring 2027.

== History ==
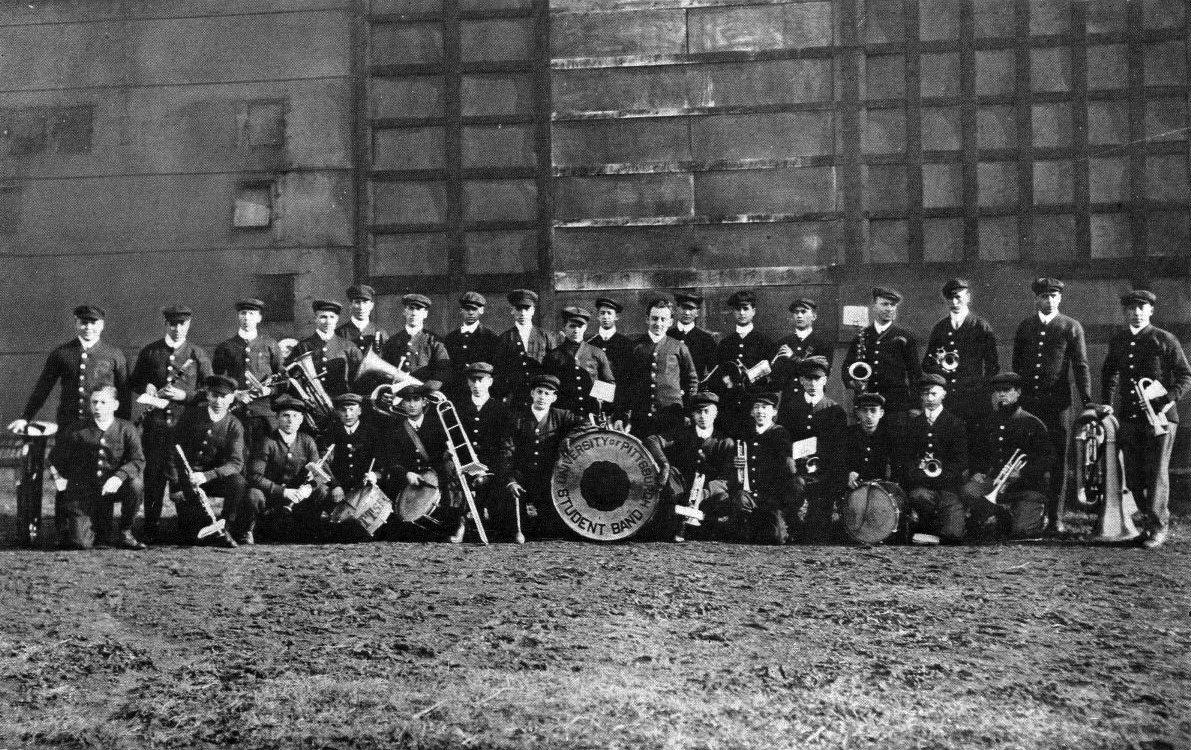
The 1912–1913 Pitt Band

The earliest noted incarnation of a university band at the school was in 1904 when it was known as the Western University of Pennsylvania. It consisted of eight young men whose official uniforms were inexpensive caps. After a few years, uniforms made up of a derby hat and a sweater were adopted, however, the uniforms never lasted longer than one season due to the especially fragile nature of the derby. An official organization of a student marching band occurred in 1911, the year often cited as its date of establishment, and the band made its first appearance that year at Forbes Field on 14 October 1911 at the Pitt vs. Ohio Northern game with just 8 musicians in uniforms only consisting of scarlet felt caps with blue tassels. Band members played on seven instruments borrowed from Becher's Music Store. The original band was organized by Dr. Earl Miller and James G. Oliver while Carl Sabad became the Student Leader and Don Kirk played the role of manager, who obtained commitments to its membership from 22 men. Half of the funding for the band was initially provided by the Athletic Council with the other half donated by students, alumni, and friends of the University. Uniforms were provided in 1912, including mackinaws, from a donation by Edward V. Babcock.

The band ostensibly struggled in its early years, particularly during World War I, until 1918 when Italian immigrant Mario S. Rocereto was named director, a position he held until his retirement in 1934. Rocereto raised the standards of the band by making membership in the band try-out only and adding new uniforms consisting of blue overcoats with blue and gold caps paid for by the Athletic Council. The band greatly grew and improved under Rocereto. The band gave its first home concert on 5 April 1922 in the Carnegie Music Hall and was composed of male musicians from multiple schools within the university. In the late 1930s, Pitt’s military department took over direction of the band and enrollment became restricted to ROTC members. Band uniforms were military-like with cross belts and members had to pass rigid musical aptitude and marching tests.

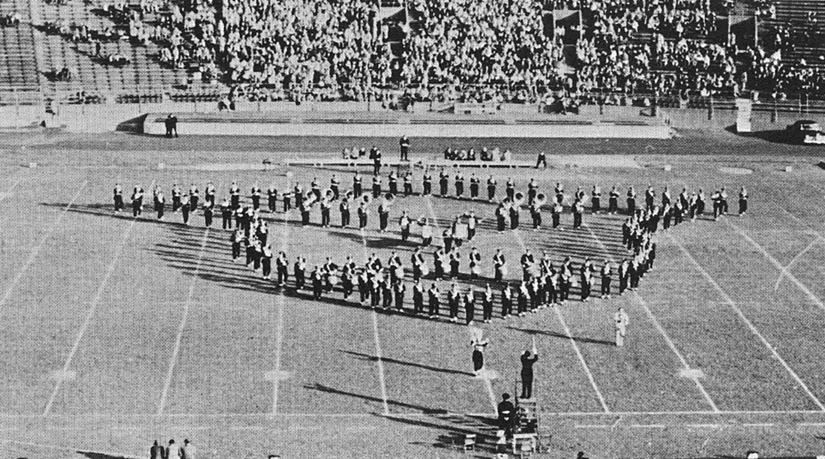
During the 1950s, the Pitt Band, shown here during the 1952 Pitt football season, would close halftime shows playing the "Alma Mater" in the Panther Head formation.

From 1939 to 1971, Robert “Ace” Arthur was the director of the band. Under his leadership in the 1940s the Pitt Band developed a national reputation and was considered by some among the top collegiate marching bands in the nation. The band during this period performed the halftime show of the 1956 Sugar Bowl, and the band provided a presidential escort for president Dwight D. Eisenhower at Fort Ligonier in 1958.

Arthur was succeeded by a director, Edmund Williams, who only stayed for one year, who was succeeded in turn by Donald E. Hower. Hower led the band from 1972 to 1985, and its numbers grew considerably under Hower in line with the rebirth of football program from the mid 1970s. Female musicians first joined the band in 1972, and the baton twirling majorette corps, the Golden Girls, was added around 1975. This incarnation of the band played at the 1977 Sugar Bowl, where Pitt defeated Georgia to become the 1976 national champions.

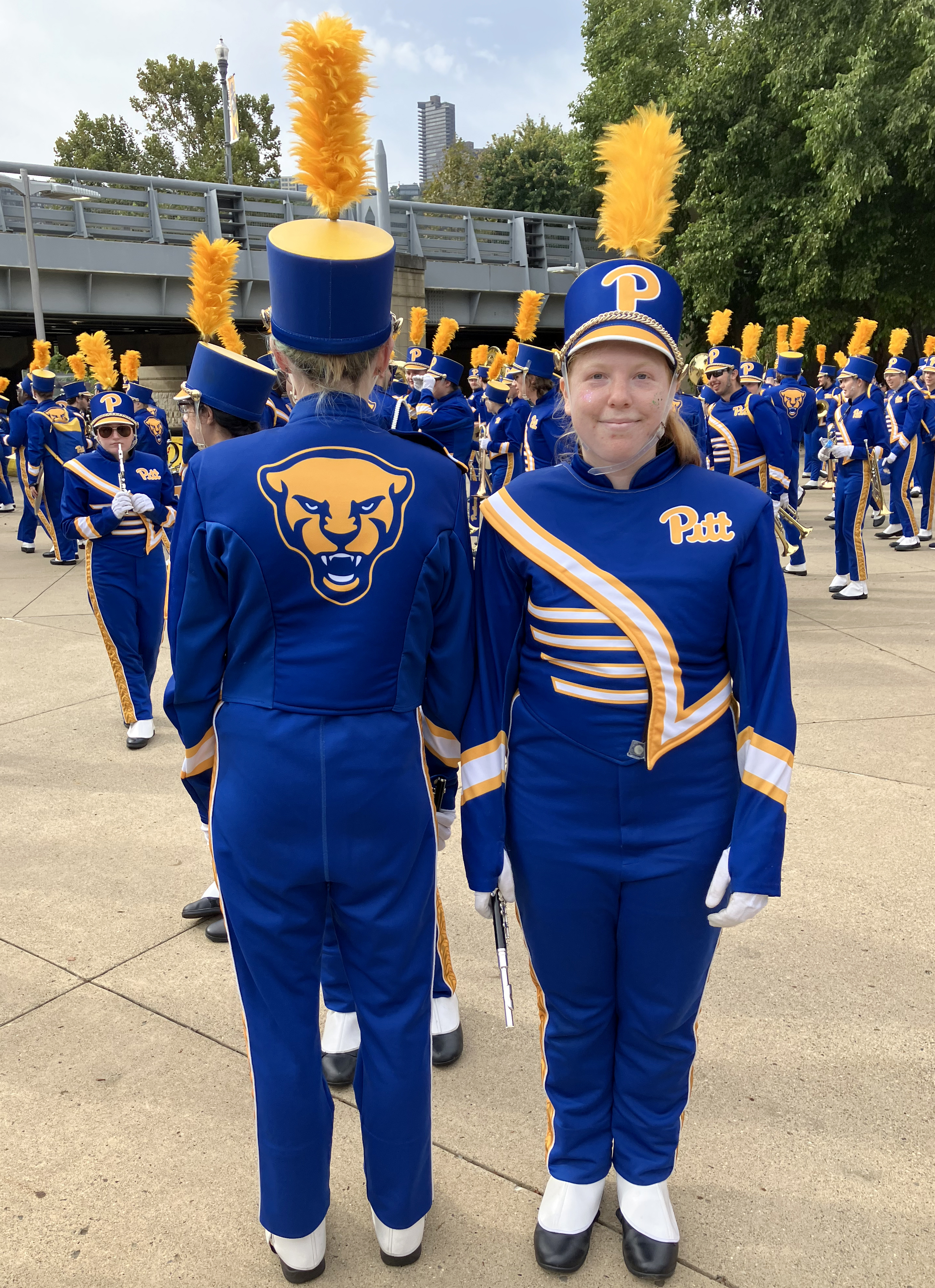
Front and back of the uniforms worn by the Pitt Band in 2025.

O’Neil Sanford led the band from 1985 to 1995 and added a 16-member color guard. However, his time was marked by a decline not only in the fortunes of the football team, but also declining interest in the band—reflected in the falling numbers of marching musicians as the years went on, as well as the poor morale and discipline which were the hallmarks of his tenure.

Sanford was pressured to resign in 1995, because of both the perceived state of the organization as well as a little-reported scandal involving accounting irregularities in his music department. It was at this time that long-time assistant director Jack R. Anderson became director. Under Anderson the band grew once more, becoming one of the largest student organizations on campus. Notable performances under Anderson’s leadership included the 2005 Fiesta Bowl and the 2008 Sun Bowl. The band also celebrated its centennial under Anderson in 2011. On 10 September 2012, Anderson announced his retirement, effective at the conclusion of the 2012–2013 academic year. His successor, Dr. Brad Townsend, was named on 31 January 2013.

== Performances ==
The band plays at all home Pitt football games at Heinz Field and one away game per season. They also play at any post-season bowl games and at campus pep rallies and university functions. A smaller pep band also travels with the team to many away games to perform in the stands.

=== Home game performances ===
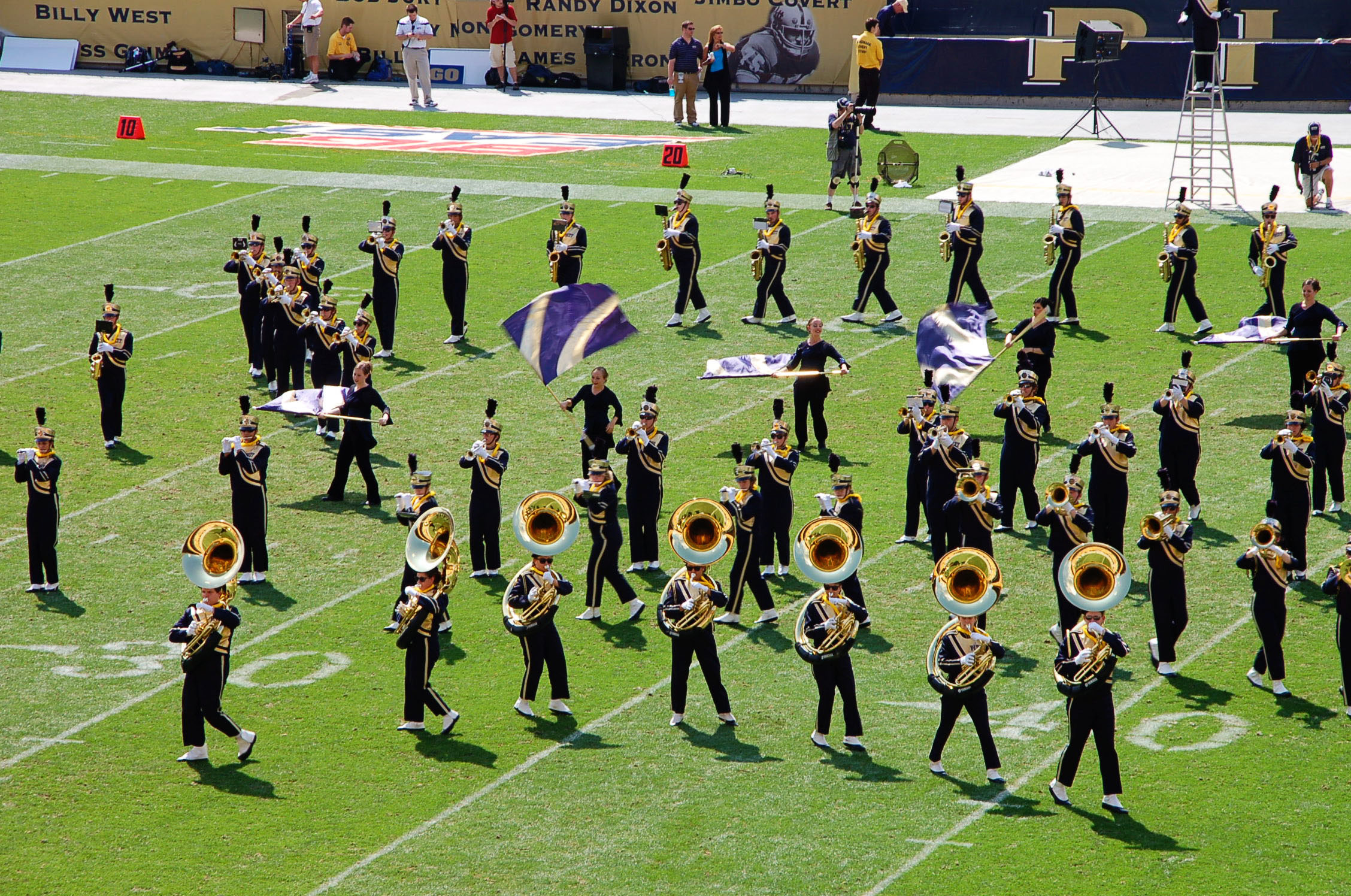
A portion of the Pitt Band performing at Heinz Field in September 2011.

The band begins playing two hours before kickoff with The Panther Prowl. The football team walks from a nearby hotel and must pass in front of the gate to Heinz Field. The band forms an arc in front of the gate and plays the university fight songs for the team and fans as they proceed to the locker room. The band then moves to the riverside concourse to play the music for the day's halftime show.

After these concerts, the band proceeds to play several concerts to the various pregame groups, such as the student tailgate at Roberto Clemente Memorial Park, a group at Grille 36, and occasionally for band alumni tailgates before lining up to parade back down North Shore Drive and into Heinz Field.

The band then performs their traditional pregame show in the stadium.

=== Performance traditions ===
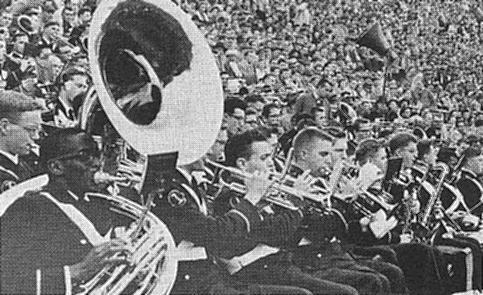
The brass section of the Pitt Band blares out "Hail to Pitt" during a 14-7 Pitt football win over Syracuse University at Pitt Stadium in 1956.

The Pitt Band pregame is always announced by the Herald Trumpets. This is followed by a performance by the Pitt Drumline near the student section. After this, the entire band enters the field for the pregame show.

The band enters the field from two tunnels flanking the north endzone of Heinz Field. As the band enters, the two tunnels are engulfed in a white cloudy smoke to appear as though the band is emerging from the smoky entryway. The band then forms a large block.

The entire pregame show consists of "Hail to Pitt", the "University of Pittsburgh Alma Mater", "The Star-Spangled Banner", the "Victory Song", and "The Panther Song." During the latter two songs, the band moves from their block formation and ends in the "Script Pitt" formation.

The band performs a different halftime show each home game. Traditionally the performances follow a general theme, such as a performer (e.g., Bon Jovi) or a current trend (e.g., Guitar Hero or a "Salute to Pittsburgh"). The music is arranged in-house by Dr. Mel Orange, so it is unique to the Pitt Band. An example is the DragonForce song "Through the Fire and Flames," which was performed at several large games during the 2008 season, culminating at the 2008 Brut Sun Bowl.

In the stands during each game, the band performs a variety of stand "shorts," drum cadences, and longer arrangements of pop songs, with the shorts and cadences being arranged in-house. The cadences, shorts, and even select longer pieces, are often accompanied by movements like horn swings or jumping. A recent tradition involving these songs is the performance of The Offspring's "The Kids Aren't Alright" and the song "Snakes on a Plane (Bring It)" by Cobra Starship. Both involve a large number of movements, with each section typically having its own unique swings or dance. Off the field, these two songs are also played at parades, pep rallies, or other performances featuring the band.

== The band ==
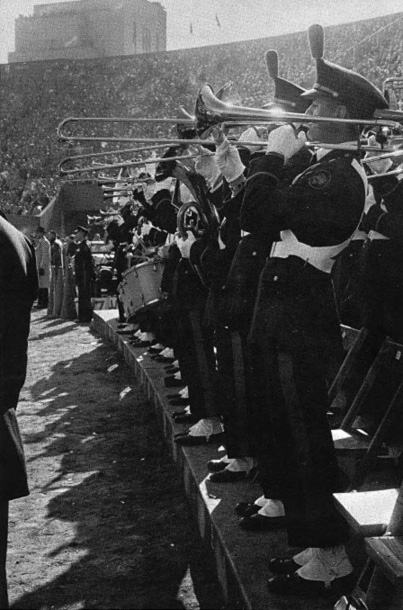
The Pitt Band plays the "Victory Song" at the end of a 26-13 win over Notre Dame at Pitt Stadium during the 1956 Pitt football season.

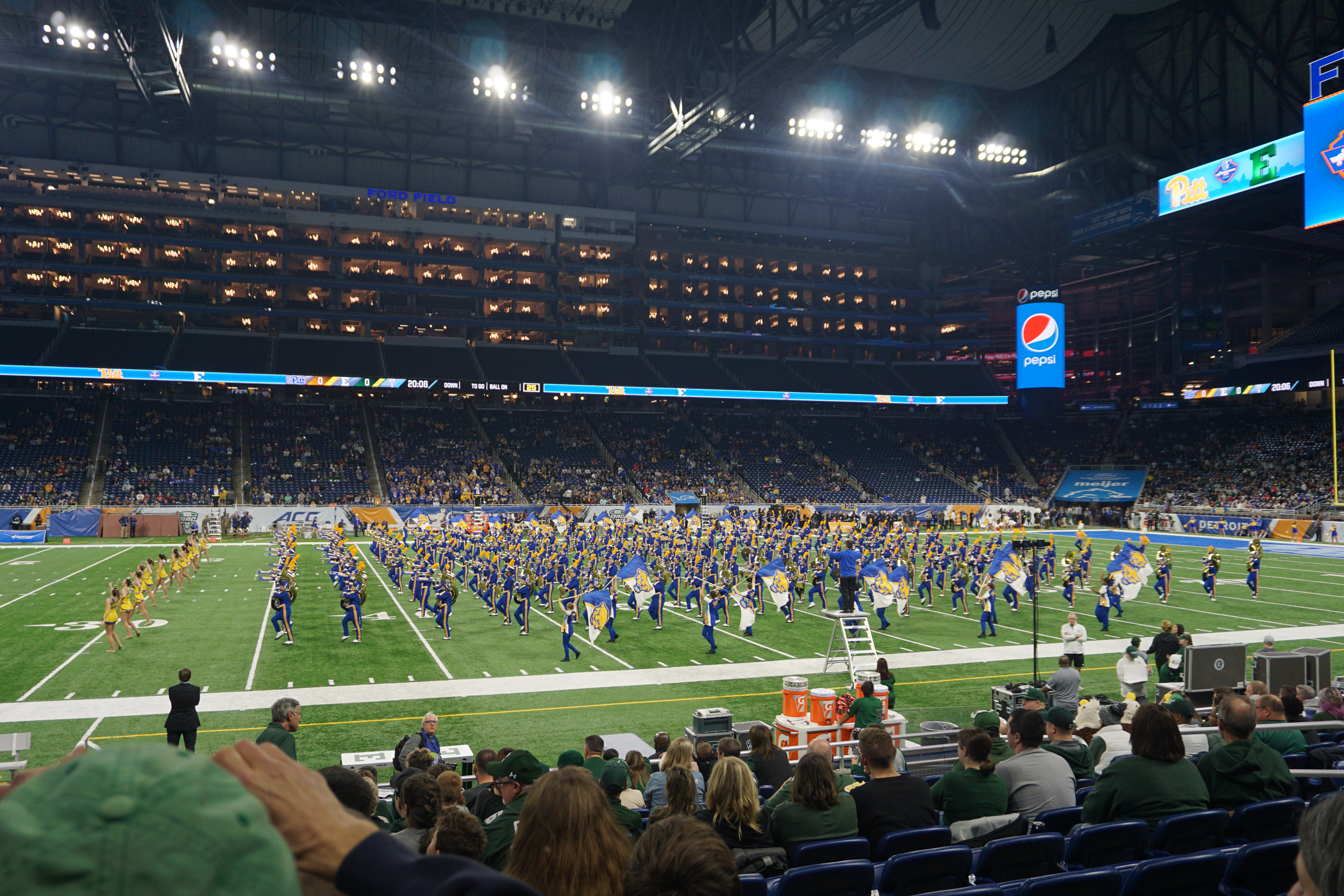
The Pitt Band playing at the 2019 Quick Lane Bowl

=== Herald Trumpets ===
Founded in 1958, the Herald Trumpets are a trumpet section of the Pitt Band that performs prior to Pitt football home games at Heinz Field. They are also sometimes used to usher in the Pitt men's basketball team prior to their home games at the Petersen Events Center.

=== Drumline ===
The Pitt Drumline, also known as "Crew," is the percussion section of the Pitt Band. The Pitt drumline has a long tradition that stretches back to the mid-1960s. At the beginning of the 1979 Football season, the drumline marched as a unified unit in drills, instead of being split into four person squads, for the first time. This was due to the band hiring of Lorry Yednak as the Percussion Instructor and several members of the line having had experience marching in DCI corps. They desired a unified sound that could not be achieved with the line split in various locations over the field in numerous squads. At this time marching bells and Vibraphone were added but marched with the line instead of performing from a "pit." Due to all of the drums having a silver chrome finish, during this time the Drumline was known as the "Chrome Wall." At the conclusion of post-game cadences, all members of the line would hold both sticks in the air in their right hand and chant, "All Hail the Chrome Wall!" and then drop their sticks to the ground.

In 1985 the Drumline became known as "The Crew" after a riotous "Octoberfest" in August party. Members of the Crew became known by nicknames such as Rox, Little Beaver, Mysterious, and Curtis Blow. The Crew began a tradition of occasionally performing their intricate sequence of cadences at band festivals, sometimes accompanied by the Golden Girls and Color Guard. The first Crewhouse was established in 1987. New gold Slingerland drums were ordered for the 1986 season. The Crew also began the tradition of performing a fast introduction cadence written by section leader Chuck Lee "Garfield" followed by a rap beat influenced "Noise". During the mid-late 1980s, Assistant Band Director David Moy and Drum Instructor Dan "Danno" Yadesky wrote the percussion section music providing a consistent and polished sound. The current Drumline Instructor is Connor Stewart.

=== Golden Girls ===
The majorette corps of the Pitt Band are known for their gold-sequined outfits and for being the "Glitz and Glamour of the Pitt Band." In their inaugural 1975 season they were directed by Larry Cervi. Since then, the original fight song choreography has remained largely the same, adding in one and two turn-spin tricks. E Michael Bauldauf served as the director/instructor/choreographer starting in 1991, and continued through 2018. In the early 2000s, the Golden Girls competed at AYOP, the National Baton Twirling Association championships, capturing the Collegiate Champion title four out of five years under his leadership. In 2015, Jessica (Megliss) Potetz started working alongside E Michael and in 2018, remained solely as the coach. The Golden Girls celebrated 50 years of “Glitz and Glamour” in 2025. During the celebration, Larry Cervi was recognized with the Pitt Band ICON award, honoring lifetime achievement for his work and dedication to the performing arts at Pitt and beyond.

=== Colorguard ===
Also known as the "Royal Court," the Pitt Colorguard is the auxiliary section of the marching band. Founded in 1986, the guard adds visual effects on the field with flag work, dancing, and other various props. In 2014, the Pitt Colorguard added a rifle line to the guard, which is often featured during halftime shows. There are currently 25 members in the guard. The guard was previously the only section that had distinct pregame and halftime uniforms until their uniform change in 2019. In the 2016 season, the Pitt Colorguard celebrated their 30th anniversary. In the 2026 season, the Pitt Colorguard celebrated their 40th anniversary. Mark Yohe and Madi Miloszewski are the Colorguard Instructors.

== See also ==
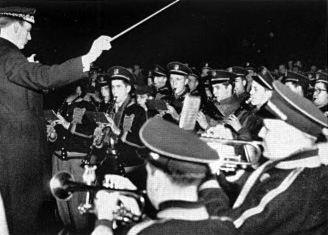
The Pitt Band performs "Hail to Pitt" at a pep rally for the 1947 Pitt vs. Penn State football game.

- Hail to Pitt
- Pitt Victory Song
- University of Pittsburgh Alma Mater
