= Pennsylvania Music Educators Association =

Musical organization

Pennsylvania Music Educators Association (PMEA)
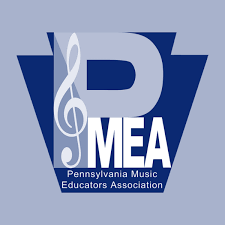
- Founded: 1933
- Type: Educational charitable organization
- Purpose: Music education
- Location: 56 S. Third St., Hamburg, PA 19526
- Region served: Pennsylvania
- Members: c. 5,000
- Revenue: $727,016 (2008)
- Website: www.pmea.net

The Pennsylvania Music Educators Association, more commonly known as PMEA, is the Pennsylvania state-level affiliate of the National Association for Music Education. PMEA is a statewide non-profit organization of over 5,000 members reaching thousands of students, dedicated to promoting the musical development of all Pennsylvanians, especially through music education. PMEA specializes in providing competitive venues for musical performance, and in adjudicating middle and high school bands. They are the second-largest state music educators association in the United States. They have been active since 1933.

PMEA has two stated objectives. First, they wish to "promote and support quality music education, learning and performance." Second, they wish to "promote and support music education in schools and communities."

The organization wishes to improve and further develop music education in schools in Pennsylvania by encouraging excellence in the study, teaching and making of music. PMEA includes music instructors at all levels, from preschool through college, as well as those within the music industry. They promote quality music education and performance, and they support music education in schools and communities.

PMEA events take place on county, district, regional, and statewide levels, within different types of concert band, orchestra, chorus and jazz ensembles. PMEA is also affiliated with the National Association for Music Education, so many participants have a chance to compete at a national level.

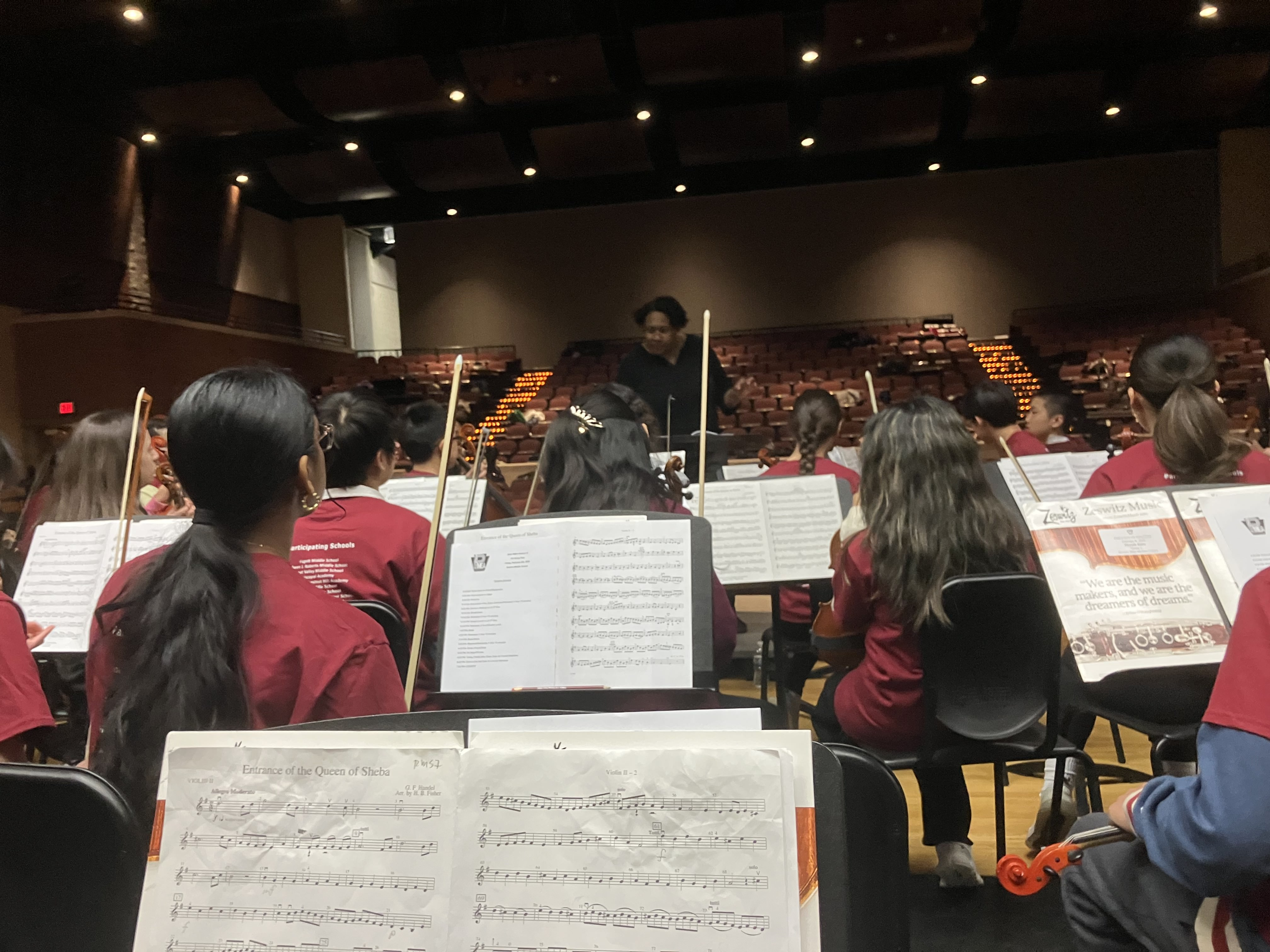
The 2026, DIstrict 12, PMEA String Fest rehearsal

The organization hosts various festivals throughout the state, within six distinct regions and 12 districts.

PMEA is headquartered in Hamburg, Pennsylvania.
