= Hail to Pitt =

Fight song of University of Pittsburgh

Pennsylvania Hall, now demolished and replaced by a modern residence hall of the same name, from inside Pitt Stadium, also now demolished. This side of Pennsylvania Hall shows the "Hail to Pitt" sign that existed in many variations throughout the years on the campus of the University of Pittsburgh. This version was painted for the 100th season of Pitt football in 1990. It depicts a stylized version of Giuseppe Moretti's Panther statues as well as the traditional script Pitt logo that served as the primary athletic logo from 1973 until 1997.

"Hail to Pitt" is the most traditional fight song of the University of Pittsburgh, which is commonly referred to as Pitt. The saying "Hail to Pitt!" is also the most traditional and commonly used slogan of the University of Pittsburgh and its athletics teams. The slogan is frequently used in promotional material, printed on merchandise and souvenirs. It was also the title of a 1982 history of Pitt athletics by author Jim O'Brien. The slogan is often used among alumni as a statement of affiliation, including as a closing signature in conversation or correspondence between alumni, and is sometime abbreviated as "HTP" or "H2P", the latter of which is a registered trademark of the university and is frequently used on official university signage and merchandise.

== History ==
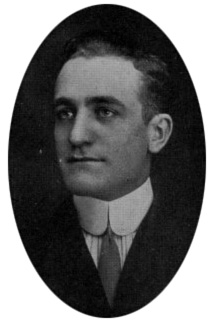
Lester M. Taylor wrote the music for "Hail to Pitt" and afterwards, according to the student yearbook, was "so besieged with offers that he almost gave up school"

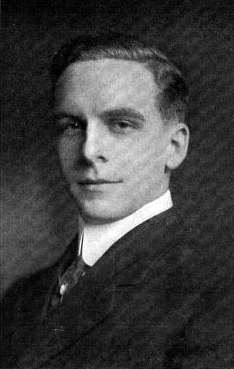
George M. Kirk, wrote the lyrics to "Hail to Pitt" and served as the football cheerleader in 1910

The musical pageantry of the University of Pittsburgh began mostly under the initiative of various students and musical groups in the early twentieth century. It was during this period, around 1908, that the university began the process of moving from what is now Pittsburgh's North Side to its current location in the Oakland section of Pittsburgh. At the time of this relocation, the university, then known as the Western University of Pennsylvania, also obtained an alteration to its charter in order to change its name to the University of Pittsburgh. These changes also corresponded with the celebration of the City of Pittsburgh's sesquicentennial and a rise in prominence of the university's athletic programs, exemplified by the undefeated and unscored upon football team of 1910, and led to crescendo and pride and optimism throughout the university. In this atmosphere, an abundance of music and chants extolling the newly renamed university appeared throughout student productions and publications. While some have faded into obscurity, among the most popular and pervasive of music and slogans, including "Hail to Pitt" and the "Alma Mater", were derived from the efforts of these students who were among the first to have "University of Pittsburgh" printed on their diplomas.

=== Origin of "Hail to Pitt" ===
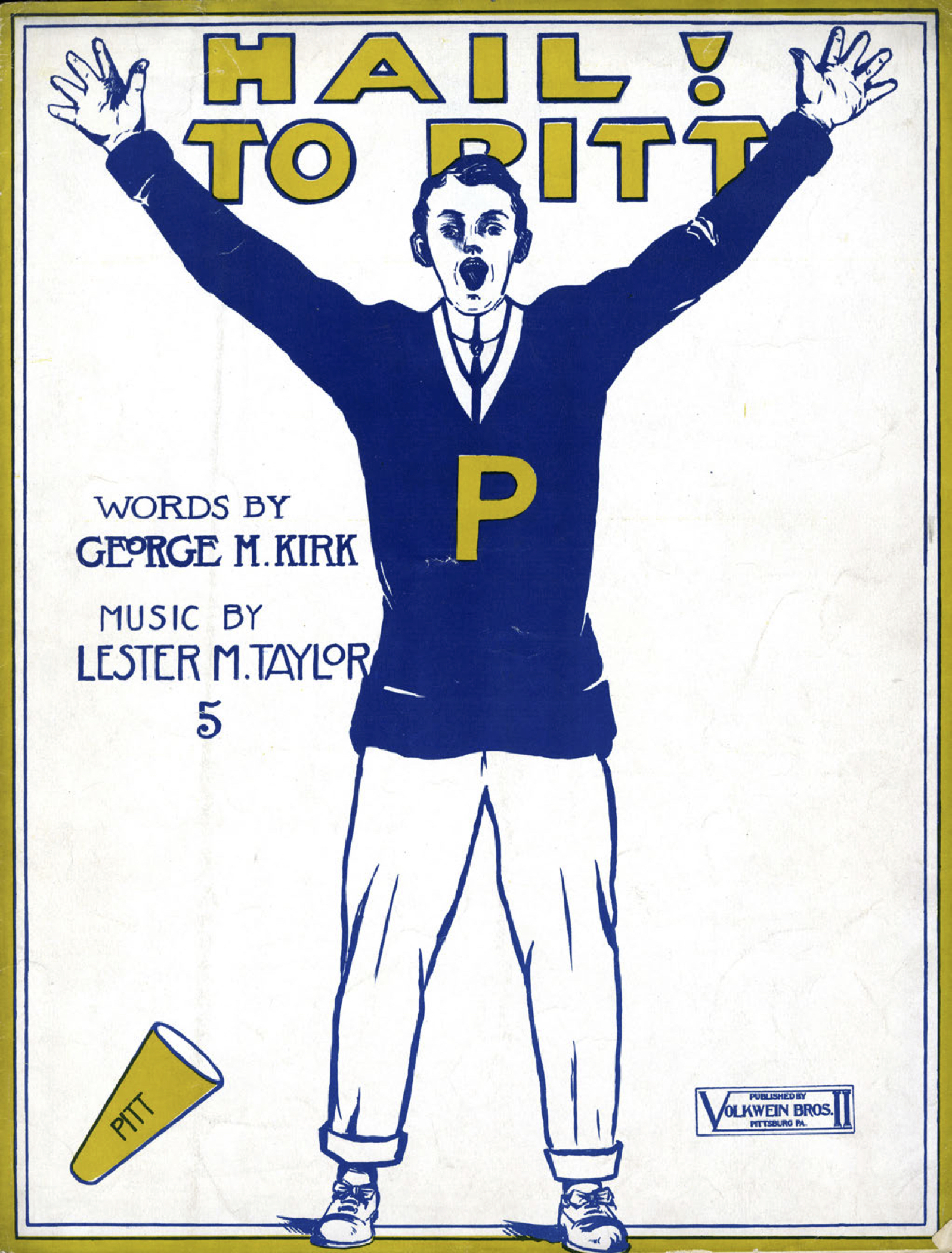
Sheet music cover for a 1910 printing of "Hail to Pitt"

"Hail to Pitt" is the most traditional of various fight songs of the University of Pittsburgh. Lyrics were written by George M. Kirk (Col. 1913) and music by Lester Milton Taylor (Eng. 1912), both of whom were members of the Beta Theta chapter of Sigma Chi at Pitt. The first performance of this song was in a production of the Cap and Gown Club, a student musical theater company, titled Here and There in the spring of 1910. Kirk himself sung the performance of his song during this production which took place in the Carnegie Music Hall, in what was the first school year that the university had relocated to the Oakland section of Pittsburgh and the second academic year after the university changed its name from the Western University of Pennsylvania. The lyrics subsequently appeared, along with other fight songs, prior to the 1910 football season in the First Annual Football Year Book and the words and music were printed by Volkwein's Music and the song was copyrighted. Kirk, who served as a Pitt cheerleader for three years, helped push for the song's use as the Pitt fight song. However, by the 1930s, the song's popularity led to issues with its use on radio broadcasts of games involving the school's successful football team. Because Pitt did not own the copyright to the song, permission for its use had to be obtained from the copyright owners prior to any broadcast. This led the university to commission and adopt a new song, the "Victory Song", to which the university owned the copyright and could freely grant permission for its use. However, "Hail to Pitt" continued to be performed and survived as the university's primary musical number.

=== Historic performances, recordings, and publication ===
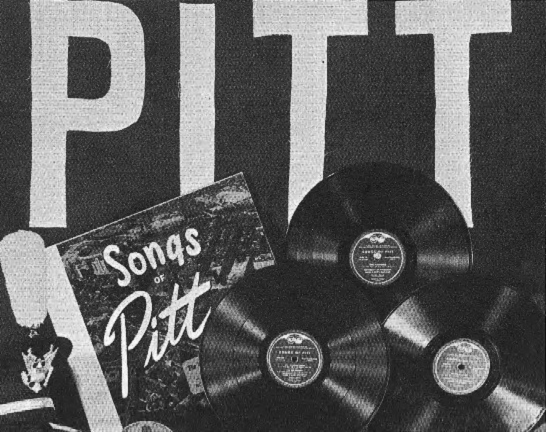
In the early 1950s, the Pitt Band and the Pitt Men's Glee Club worked with the RCA Victor recording company to release a compilation of songs titled Songs of Pitt

"Hail to Pitt" has been heard many times on local and national radio and television broadcasts and has been professional recorded several times throughout history by renowned musicians. It is believed that "Hail to Pitt" was the first college song to be broadcast on the radio when KDKA used it when airing its first football game.

One of the first professional recordings of "Hail to Pitt", along with the university's "Alma Mater", was by the Criterion Quartet on Gennett Records in 1920. In 1925 "Hail to Pitt" was also one of seven fight songs comprising a compilation song titled "Collegiate Melody" that became a huge hit for Fred Waring & the Pennsylvanians. The performance of "Hail to Pitt" appeared in Part 1 (Side A) of the 1932 Victor Records release of "Collegiate Melody", which remains the Waring's Pennsylvanians top song.

"Hail to Pitt" was also performed by Tommy Dorsey as part of his broadcast from Meadowbrook Ballroom in Cedar Grove, New Jersey on February 24, 1940, that featured Frank Sinatra among others. Dorsey's performance of "Hail to Pitt" appears on original recordings that were released from that broadcast, and is among the select songs chosen to appear on a CD rerelease titled Tommy Dorsey plays Sweet and Hot. Also during the 1940s, Joseph Wood arranged and conducted a recording of a collection of songs titled Songs of the University of Pittsburgh that featured baritone Walter Scheff, tenor Ralph Nyland, and bass baritone Michael Stewart. Released on two 78-rpm discs by Republic records, the album featured "Hail to Pitt", "Pitt Alma Mater", "The Panther", and the "Pitt Victory Song".

"Hail to Pitt" was also one of only 16 college songs performed and featured on a 1948 recording by Jan Garber and His Orchestra released as Collegiate Melodies on Capitol Records in both a 10-inch LP and a 45 rpm EP set in 1950, and re-released in 1955 as a 12-inch album. Garber's album is considered one of the best recorded collections of fight songs in existence.

During the 1952–1953 school year, the Pitt Band and the Pitt Men's Glee Club collaborated to release a compilation songs titled Songs of Pitt on RCA Victor Records. Soon after that, on October 7, 1953, the Vaughn Monroe and the Sauter-Finegan Orchestra performed "Hail to Pitt" as part of a Camel Caravan taping that was broadcast on CBS Radio Network on October 26, 1953.

The sheet music for "Hail to Pitt" has undergone various publications and has appeared in a multiple music compilations including a collection titled Songs of the University of Pittsburgh in 1929 by the Thornton W. Allen Company of New York, as well as more recently in Studwell and Schueneman's College Fight Songs published in 1998.

=== Modern use and availability ===
There have also been numerous modern releases of the fight song in various compilations, including those released in 2006 by Sound Masters titled College Fight Songs Volume 01 (SongDog Network) and in 2008 in Gameday Faves: Classic College Fight Songs Volume 2 and Volume 10 (2Thumbz Entertainment). A limited edition box titled Proud Traditions A Musical Tribute to Pitt was released on the Europadisk Ltd. label for Pitt's bicentennial in 1987 and included a booklet and three 12-inch vinyl records that included recordings of "Hail to Pitt" and university songs such as the "Victory Song", "Alma Mater", and "Wupland March". Various compilations by the Pitt Band and Pitt Men's Glee Club have also been produced for more regional distribution including Pitt Spirit released on audio cassette in 1989, Proudly Pittsburgh in 1997, and in the late 2000s Pitt Pride! and Panther Fans...Are You Ready? on compact disc. Today, besides the common performance of "Hail to Pitt" and other Pitt songs by the Pitt Band, Glee Club, and other university musical groups, "Hail to Pitt" is often heard in radio and television broadcasts, regional advertising, in various electronic merchandise, and is available for purchase in a variety of formats including compact discs, MP3s, and ringtones.

== '"Hail to Pitt" Lyrics ==
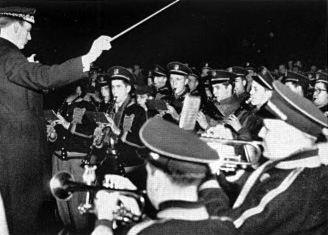
The Pitt Band performs "Hail to Pitt" at a pep rally for the 1947 Pitt vs. Penn State football game

The lyrics below represent the current lyrics to "Hail to Pitt" ascribed to by the Pitt Band. Note that "U-N-I" are sung as three distinct letters of the alphabet, not to be confused with the phrase "you and I." The Pitt Men's Glee Club sings Hail to Pitt with the more traditional "Uni" (see Traditional Hail to Pitt Lyrics below).

The lyrics stating "alleghenee, genec, genac, genac" reference the "Official University Yell" by 1891 graduate W. A. Johnston. The Yell itself is referencing the Allegheny Mountains of Western Pennsylvania. "Hail to Pitt" is believed to be the only college song to contain a college yell officially in its chorus. The yell was selected to be the "Official University Yell" by an 1889 committee which also selected the official school colors of blue and gold. One of the first printed appearances of the "Official University Yell" occurred in an 1890 issue of the University Courant, a literary society magazine, which was also the first official year of the university's football team. The existence of the inclusion of this cheer in "Hail to Pitt" represents one of the few remaining student traditions still in widespread practice today that existed prior to the turn of the twentieth century and the 1908 name change.

Down in Smokytown, in Pennsylvania,
In Pittsburgh, Pittsburgh,
We've a university we're all proud of,
Pittsburgh, Pittsburgh.
She stands a mighty fortress 'neath her colors bright,
Pittsburgh, Pittsburgh,
When forth she goes to battle 'gainst a stubborn foe
This song will upward go:

"Hail to Pitt, hail to Pitt every loyal son!
Hail to Pitt, hail to Pitt 'til the victory is won!
The gold and blue shall wave forever
On high through fair and stormy weather;
We'll sing her praises far and wide
Until the end of time!
Hooperay, hooperay for dear old U-N-I;
We'll give a grand old alleghenee, genac, genac, genac
We'll wave and cheer for many a year
And sing our songs out loud and clear
For our university."
(repeat Chorus)

Often during sporting events, pep rallies, and various alumni and student functions, only the chorus is frequently played by the Pitt Band. It is usually paired with the other two widely performed fight songs of the university: the Pitt Victory Song and "The Panther" song.

=== Variations in lyrics ===
In some instances, slight differences can be found in the modern usage of the lyrics, including the replacement of the pronoun "her" when referring to the university with "our".

A change in the lyrics was instituted on October 1, 1954, in an effort to support the city's "smoke control program" by eliminating the use of the term "smokeytown". The traditional first line:

"Down in Smokeytown in Pennsylvania, in Pittsburgh, Pittsburgh"

was eliminated and replaced with the following lyric:

"Where the Allegheny meets the Ohio, in Pittsburgh, Pittsburgh".

The replacement verse was chosen during a student congress sponsored contest. The winning submission was written by Ronald Amalong, who received a Pitt blazer for his efforts. The lyric was first sung by members of the Pitt Men's Glee Club during a ceremony attended by the city's mayor, David L. Lawrence, on the Bigelow Boulevard porch of the Cathedral of Learning during a pep rally for that season's football home opener. However, today the Pitt Band today still refers to the original lyrics on its website.

==== Traditional lyrics ====
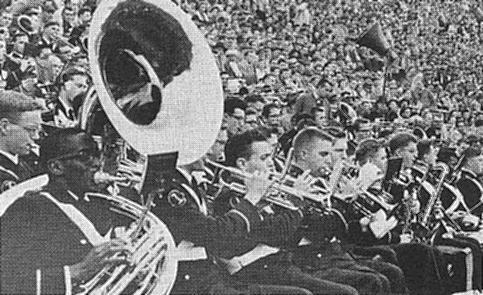
The brass section of the Pitt Band blares out "Hail to Pitt" during a 14-7 Pitt football win over Syracuse University at Pitt Stadium in 1956.

The lyrics below represent original traditional lyrics going back to but going back to a printing of the 1910 Annual Football Year Book and the 1916 edition of The Owl student yearbook. Some printings of the lyrics circa 1938 also appeared with a more generic lyric of "Hoop-hurray! Hoop-hurray for University" in the chorus.

The first stanza focuses on the university's place in the City of Pittsburgh while the second stanza specifically mentions and focuses on football. This reinforces the attention on, and popularity of, the university's football team at the time of its writing. The season in which "Hail to Pitt" was written corresponded with the undefeated Pitt football team coach by Joseph H. Thompson that outscored its opponents 282–0.

Down in Smokytown, in Pennsylvania,
In Pittsburgh, Pittsburgh,
We have a university we're all proud of,
Pittsburgh, Pittsburgh
She stand a mighty fortress 'neath her colors bright,
Pittsburgh, Pittsburgh,
When forth she goes to battle 'gainst a stubborn foe
This song will upward go:

CHORUS:
Hail to Pitt! Hail to Pitt! every loyal son,
Hail to Pitt! Hail to Pitt! 'til the victory is won,
The Gold and Blue shall wave forever
On high, through fair and stormy weather,
We'll sing her praises far and wide
Until the end of time;
Hoop-hurray! Hoop-hurray for dear old Uni,
Give her a grand old Allegheny-genac-genac-genac
We'll wave and cheer for many a year
And sing her songs out loud and clear,
For our University.

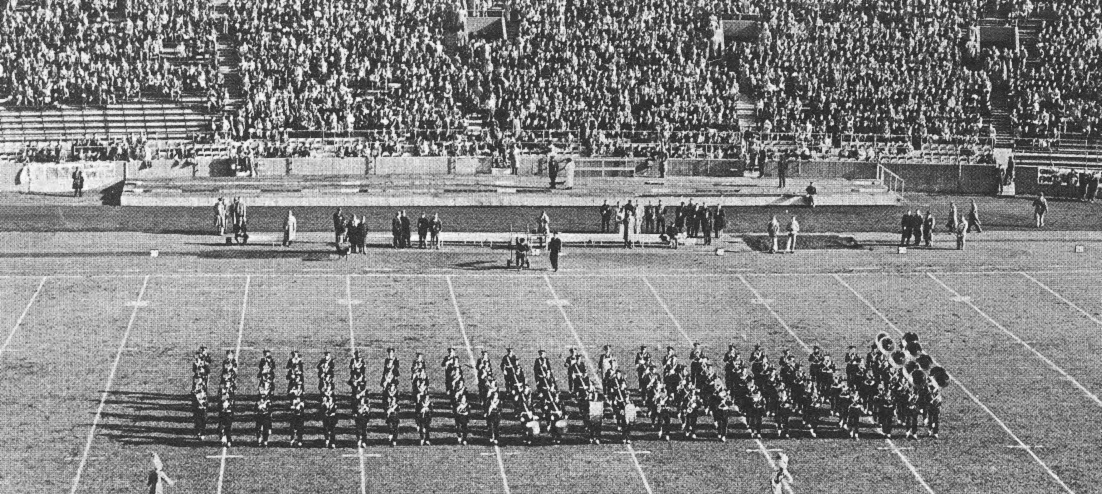
The Pitt Band, shown here during the 1952 football season in Pitt Stadium, would perform and sing "Hail to Pitt" at the end of each pre-game football show

When the grand old days of football come around,
In Pittsburgh, Pittsburgh,
Her rooters at the field will make an awful sound,
For Pittsburgh, Pittsburgh,
Down across the field her mighty line moves on,
For Pittsburgh, Pittsburgh,
They'll sweep the foe before them 'til the goal is won
Then you'll hear them shout:

== Official University Yell ==
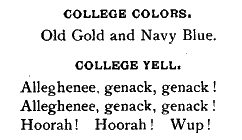
One of the earliest printed appearances of Pitt's "Official University Yell" occurred in the October 1890 edition of the University Courant (Vol. 4, No. 7), a monthly publication of the Irving Literary Society of the then-named Western University of Pennsylvania (WUP).

"Hail to Pitt" includes a reference to the Official University Yell by W. A. Johnston, class of 1891. The cheer was selected as the Official University Yell, along with blue and gold as the official colors of the university, by a committee in 1889. "Hail to Pitt" is believed to be the only college song to contain a college yell officially in its chorus. The official college yell of the university is as follows.

Alle-genee-genac-genac,
Alle-genee-genac-genac,
Hoorah-Hoorah,
Pitt!

Prior to change of the university's name in 1908 from Western University of Pennsylvania to the University of Pittsburgh, the cheer appeared in the October 1890 edition of the University Courant this way:

Alleghenee, genack, genack !
Alleghenee, genack, genack !
Hoorah ! Hoorah ! Wup !

== Common Pitt songs ==
"Hail to Pitt" is one of the primary parts of the University of Pittsburgh's musical pageantry, but many other songs about the university have been written over the years. Along with "Hail to Pitt", "The Panther", also known as "The Panther Song", is often paired with "Hail to Pitt" when performed. In addition, the Pitt "Victory Song" is also commonly played with "Hail to Pitt". These three songs typically form the primary montage of Pitt songs that is heard at university events and Pitt athletic contests. The University of Pittsburgh's "Alma Mater" will also commonly be played, typically to open or close these same events. The melodies of these four songs, if not the lyrics, are familiar to most fans, faculty, staff, and alumni of the university and, having been ingrained into the school's culture over the years, have become the primary musical tradition at Pitt.

=== The Panther song ===
Horace C. Scott wrote the lyrics for "The Panther" and also was the president of Pitt's Men's Glee Club

Often paired with "Hail to Pitt" or the "Pitt Victory Song", the short "The Panther" is often used as an introduction to, or bridge, between them. Lyrics were written by Horace C. Scott (Dent. 1915), who was president of Men's Glee Club while at Pitt, and later served in the medical service of World War I. The music was written by Clarence S. Harris (Dent. 1916). One of the earlier printings of "The Panther" was with a collection titled Songs of the University of Pittsburgh in 1929 by the Thornton W. Allen Company of New York. During the 1940s, Joseph Wood conducted a recording of a collection of songs titled Songs of the University of Pittsburgh that featured Walter Scheff, Ralph Nyland, and Michael Stewart. Released on two 78-rpm discs by Republic records, the album featured "The Panther", as well as "Hail to Pitt", the "Victory Song", and the "Alma Mater". "The Panther" also appears with "Hail to Pitt" on Gameday Faves: Classic College Fight Songs Volume 10.

Currently lyrics used in the "Panther Song" as currently taught to incoming Pitt Band freshmen are as follows:

"Old Pittsburgh's Glory
Won't be trampled down today by any foe, foe, foe!
For Pittsburgh's Glory,
We'll fight you square, we'll play you fair at any game you know.
And when the sun sets,
You'll hear our good old dong of victory...

Oh, when the Panther screams, you know the battle's just begun —
And if you don't look out, he'll surely get you on the run
For Pittsburgh's Glory,
And the honor of our University!"

Lyrics ascribed to the song from a 1927 Thornton W. Allen printing of an Intercollegiate Song Book vary slightly:

"Pittsburgh's glory
won't be trampled down today by any foe,
For Pittsburgh's glory we'll fight you square, we'll play you fair, at any game you know,
And 'ere the sun sets
you'll hear our good old song of victory.

Oh, if the Panther screams it means a battle just begun,
And if you don't watch out he'll get you on the run,
For Pittsburgh's glory,
And the honor of our University."

=== Victory Song ===
The "Victory Song" was originally created to solve the issue of the university not owning the copyright to "Hail to Pitt" which prevented the school from granting permission for its use during football radio broadcasts. The "Victory Song", which was written by three former Pitt students, proved to be popular and is still widely performed, often being paired with "Hail to Pitt" and the "Panther Song". The "Victory Song" prominently features the most commonly used cheer at Pitt athletic events: "Let's Go Pitt!"

=== Alma Mater ===
Performed in a less raucous nature than the fight songs, the official alma mater of the University of Pittsburgh is set to the tune of Joseph Haydn's 1797 anthem for the Austrian Emperor and since 1922 has served as the German National Anthem.

== Other Pitt songs and chants ==
These school songs are seldom heard or used today, but are documented in various University publications. Together, they help tell the history of musical pageantry at the University of Pittsburgh, but have not enjoyed the popularity or longevity of "Hail to Pitt", the "Victory Song", "The Panther", and the Pitt "Alma Mater".

One such song is "The Pitt Panther" whose music was written by Louis J. Panella in 1922 and whose lyrics were penned by Howard E. Reppert, class of 1923. "The Pitt Panther" was recorded on the album Pittsburgh On Parade by the River CIty Brass Band in 1993. Panella also wrote "Billy Pitt" around 1923 to go with a melody composed by C.V. Starrett, class of 1924. George Morrill Kirk, who wrote the lyrics for "Hail to Pitt", as wrote the lyrics and music to "Pittsburgh's Big Team" which was copyrighted in 1916. Horace C. Scott and C.S. Harris, who wrote "The Panther" song, also wrote "School Chant" (or "Chant") around 1915 and "The Battle Song" which was copyrighted in 1925. "Fight, Fight, Fight!" was penned by Richard M. Skidmore, medical school class of 1931. "Cheer for the Dear Old Lady" had lyrics by "G.M. P.B.", class of 1909 with music by "E.S.", class of 1921. Other known songs are as follows.

=== Pitt Fight Song ===
Although not one of the more predominantly performed songs of the university, "Pitt Fight Song", was written by Kenneth N. McKee, class of 1925. It is still occasionally performed by the Pitt Men's Glee Club.

"Dear Old Pittsburgh, dear Old Pittsburgh,
Fight, Fight, Fight, Fight, Fight!
All together we will ever
Fight, Fight, Fight, Fight, Fight!
Let the grizzly Panther roar
while the boys pile up the score
For dear old Pittsburgh, dear old Pittsburgh,
Fight, Fight, Fight

Let the grizzly Panther roar
while the boys pile up the score
For dear old Pittsburgh, dear old Pittsburgh,
Fight, Fight, Fight"

=== Our Old Pittsburgh ===
Song to the tune to the "Stein Song" from the early 20th century musical comedy "Prince of Pilsen".

"Come, brothers, sing the old song again,
Our paean to Alma Mater,
We who have followed Her beacon light
And marched 'neath Her banner fair,
Sing of Her fame in the days gone by
And the glory the years have brought Her;
Her colors we wear, Her honors we share,
Then sing till the winds reply;

Here's to our University,
Here's to Her Gold and Blue,
Here's to Alumni and Faculty,
Here's to Her Students true,
Here's to Her fame in years to come,
Bright may Her laurels be,
Here's to Old Pittsburgh the glorious,
Here's to old U. of P.

Our Old Pittsburgh, dear Old Pittsburgh,
With love that never tires
Thy loyal sons in homage stand
About Thine altar fires;
Though in the strife of after life
Far from Thy shrine we be,
Our loyal hearts will ever burn
With love, dear Pitt, for Thee,
Our loyal hearts will ever burn
With love, dear Pitt, for Thee."

=== Pitt ===
The lyrics of this fight song were written by Carl F. Ohlinger (Col. 1910) with music by Harriette Slattery (Western Pennsylvania Institution for the Blind, 1904).

"Now's the time to make a noise and shout for all you're worth,
Pitt, Pitt, Pittsburgh, Pitt, Pitt, Pitt!
Isn't it the greatest place that's anywhere on earth?
Pitt, Pitt, Pittsburgh, Pitt, Pitt, Pitt!
Wave your pennants, spread your banners, let our ribbons stream,
Fellows, throw your hats in air, and all you Co-eds, scream,
Show the world what spirit is for city, school and team,
Pitt, Pitt, Pittsburgh; Pitt, Pitt, Pitt!
What's the use of faculty unless to sing and shout,
Pitt, Pitt, Pittsburgh, Pitt, Pitt, Pitt!
Soon we'll make the nation wonder what it's all about,
Pitt, Pitt, Pittsburgh, Pitt, Pitt, Pitt!
Let the quaking hills resound, and pierce our smoky sky,
Let Ohio's parent waters tremble at the cry,
Then will all the citizens to Uni's cheer reply,
Pitt, Pitt, Pittsburgh; Pitt, Pitt, Pitt!"

=== Let's Give Old Alleghenee ===
"Let's Give Old Alleghenee" was featured as song "No. 16" in a list of "Varsity Songs" in the 1910 Football Year Book. This song also incorporated the Official University Yell into its lyrics, similar to how it is also incorporated into "Hail to Pitt". One could speculate that this song could have been in existence prior to the 1908 name change as the verses referring to "Pitt" could easily be exchanged with "Wup" or "W.U.P."

"Whenever, wherever, Pitt men get together—
Green Freshmen or gray-bearded Grads,
Grave Jurists of years or gay young Engineers,
Staid Doctors or frolicsome Lads,
The Dentists, the Teachers, the Bankers, the Preachers,
And prominent Men of the Day—
Whenever, wherever, Pitt men get together,
Someone is then sure to say:

REFRAIN.

Let's give, let's give, let's give Old Alleghenee!
All together, in Uni's praise,
Grand old yell of our college days!
Here's to — — The Gold and Blue,
Here's to the Varsitee!
A warm hand-shake for old sake's sake,
Then, hip! hip! Alleghenee;
(Spoken) . . . . . . . . . .
Alle-genee-genac-genac,
Alle-genee-genac-genac,
Hoorah-Hoorah-Pitt,
That's Old Alleghenee,

Whenever, wherever, Pitt men get together,
To honor the School they revere,
Their voices ring strong in the old college song,
And boom out the old college cheer;
'Til raw throats rebelling prevent further yelling,
And music in growls dies away;
Yet vocal affliction to Pitt's no restriction,
And some one is then sure to say:

REFRAIN.

Let's give, let's give, let's give the 'Varsity Clap,
Pittsburgh's slogan in every land—
Give Old Alleghenee by hand;
One-two-three — — U. of P.
Now with spirit and snap,
Let's give the gattling, smashing rattling,
Good old 'Varsity Clap:

(The Hand Clap) . . . . . . . . . .
. . . . . . . .
. . . . . . . .
. . . . . . . . .
That's the Varsity Clap."

=== Fight For Pittsburgh ===
"Fight for Pittsburgh" appeared in the 1916 The Owl student yearbook. It was also selected to appear in the compilation Five Pitt Songs that was assembled and edited by the University of Pittsburgh Music Department in 1920 along with "Hail to Pitt", "Alma Mater", "O, O, O, O", and "Here's to Good Old Pitt". Although not in common use anymore, its inclusion in this collection indicates it may have been one of the more popular early songs.

"For we'll fight, fight, fight for Pittsburgh,
As the team comes down the field;
For we'll fight, fight, fight for Pittsburgh,
For the team will never yield;
For we'll fight, fight, fight for Pittsburgh,
Can't you hear those rooters roar,
Touchdown, Touchdown,
Pittsburgh,
As they're rolling up the score."

=== O—O—O—O ===
"O—O—O—O" both in the 1916 The Owl student yearbook. It was also selected to appear in the compilation Five Pitt Songs that was assembled and edited by the University of Pittsburgh Music Department in 1920 along with "Hail to Pitt", "Alma Mater", "Fight for Pittsburgh", and "Here's to Good Old Pitt". Although not in common use anymore, its inclusion in this collection indicates it may have been one of the more popular early songs.

"O—O—O—O,
Eat 'em up, Pitt,
Eat 'em up, Pitt,
We want a touchdown,
Eat 'em up, Pitt,
Eat 'em up, Pitt,
One more touchdown"

=== My Gold and Blue ===
A short song to the tune of the chorus of "Pony Boy".

"Gold and Blue, Gold and Blue,
Show them now what you can do,
We're with you, here with you,
Pull for Victory,
Five more yards, three more yards,
One more yard, touchdown,
Hoop-it-up, Hoop-it-up, Hoop-it-up Boys!
My Gold and Blue."

=== E Yip I Addy ===
A short song to the tune of "E-Yip-I-Ad-dy-I-Ay-I-Ay".

"Rise Brothers of Pitt, Alma Mater is calling,
Leap strong in her strength to the fray,
By the love of "Old Uni," whose colors we wear,
We'll conquer the foemen to-day;
We've faith in you boys, and whatever betides,
To Pitt and our team we'll be true,
On, boys, to the fray, while the foe in dismay,
Hear us cheer for the Gold and the Blue."

CHORUS.

"E-Yip-I-Ad-dy-I-Ay-I-Ay!
E-Yip-I-Ad-dy-I-Ay!
Alma Mater depends on you,
Hit the line for the Gold and the Blue;
E-Yip-I-Ad-dy-I-Ay-I-Ay!
Old Pittsburgh conquers to day!
Just roll up the score and we'll yell evermore,
E-Yip-I-Ad-dy-I-Ay!"

=== Marching through Uni ===
An early song set to the tune of Marching Through Georgia was sung by the Pitt Men's Glee Club when the university was still called the Western University of Pennsylvania. The words were composed by G.H. Barbour, class of 1887. The lyrics were presented in the Western University Courant as follows:

"Rally round your colors, lads, uplift the Gold and Blue;
Let the population know those tints are dear to you;
Sound the dear old college yell, and pierce the heavens through,
As we go marching through Uni.

Let the Freshman shout again, the Sophomore rejoice,
Let the Junior pound his cane, the Senior make a noise,
Let the graduates all sing, with one united voice,
As we go marching through Uni.

Let the people join to swell the volume of the song,
Ladies whom we love so well fill out the mighty throng,
Let the wandering winds impel the minstrelsy along,
As we go marching through Uni."

CHORUS:

"The Gold, the Blue, the University,
The gold and blue colors are prominently featured.

Rally round your colors, lads, and sing the jubilee,

As we go marching through Uni."
