= Richard Hoffmann (composer) =

American composer (1925–2021)

Richard Hoffmann (20 April 1925 – 24 June 2021) was an American composer, musicologist and educator. He served many years as a professor at Oberlin Conservatory of Music.

== Early life ==
Hoffmann was born in Vienna, Austria, the son of Richard and Emanuela Hoffmann. In 1935, the family emigrated to New Zealand, where Hoffmann subsequently received a Bachelor of Music degree from the University of New Zealand in 1945.

Hoffmann went on to the USA in 1947, primarily to study composition with his cousin, Arnold Schoenberg (1948–1951). At the same time he also became Schoenberg's secretary and amanuensis.

== Musical style ==
About the String Trio, which was begun in 1961 (Altmünster, Austria) and, after approximately a year's interruption, completed in 1963 (Los Angeles, California) the composer wrote:

The piece is in a single movement (approximately 15 minutes). The kaleidoscopic treatment of the musical substance in detail (fragmentation, juxtaposition, rotation); the confluence of a number of coequal contrasting sections (elision, dovetailing); the interaction of disparate elements; rhythmic dissonance; conflicting dynamics (even with sustained sonorities); the notation of each instrument on three staves (upper: sul ponticello or sul tasto, the middle: arco, the lower: pizzicato or col legno), and localized accelerandi and ritardandi – all are designed to create the maximum possible illusion of multidimensional movement and to emulate in sound the inherently unstable characteristics of a mobile. This is done without recourse to the arbitrariness and forced spontaneity of improvisation, but rather, within the paradoxical framework of rigid control and matrix-like construction.

== Teaching career ==
Hoffmann began his career as a professor at Oberlin Conservatory of Music in 1954, where he worked until 2004. He was a visiting professor at the University of California, Berkeley from 1965 to 1966, at Victoria University in 1968, at Harvard University in 1970, at the University of Iowa in 1976 and at Vienna University in 1984. His students included Jonathan Dawe, Pierre Jalbert, Stan Link, David Serkin Ludwig, Christopher Rouse, Daniel Schechter, and Robert Spano just to name a few.

== Achievements ==
Hoffmann received awards from the Fromm Music Foundation Commission in 1960 (Orchestral Piece No. 2, 1961, Universal Edition, London (1963), UE13635LW) and National Institute of Arts and Letters in 1966. Also he was given a grant from National Education Association in 1976, 1978–1979 and Fulbright Foundation in 1984–1985.

== Personal life ==
On December 21, 1957, Hoffmann married Joan Alfhild Flint. They have 3 children. Hoffmann died in Oberlin, Ohio, on June 24, 2021, aged 96.

== Compositions ==
- Orchestral
  - Prelude and Double Fugue, strings, 1944
  - Violin Concerto, 1948
  - Orchestral Piece, 1952
  - Piano Concerto, 1953–54 – Mobart Music Publications/Schott
  - Cello Concerto, 1956–59 – Mobart Music Publications MOB 8540/Schott
  - Orchestral Piece [No. 2], 1961, publ. Universal Edition, London (1963), UE13635LW
  - Music for Strings, for solo violin and string orchestra, 1970–71 – Mobart Music Publications/Schott
  - Souffleur, for symphony orchestra without conductor, 1975–76
- Vocal
  - 3 Songs (R. M. Rilke), 1948
  - 3 Songs (Rilke, Jakob Haringer), soprano, piano, 1950
  - 2 Songs (M. Maeterlink, E. St Vincent Millay), soprano, piano, 1953–54
  - Mutterauge (trad.), chorus, 1956
  - Memento mori (grave stone inscriptions), men's 48 voices, tape, 1966–69
  - Les adieux (R. Hoffmann), chorus, orchestra, 1980–83
  - 2 Poems (A. Giraud), 1 voice, flute + piccolo, bass clarinet, violin, viola, cello, piano, 1986
  - Lacrymosa '91 (H. Heine), chorus, orchestra, 1990
  - 2 Songs (F. Rückert, Heine), soprano, string trio, percussion, 1990 [arr. chamber orchestra, 1991]
  - Die Heimkehr (G. Trakl), 1 voice, double chorus, orchestra, 1997
- Chamber and solo
  - String Quartet No. 1, 1947
  - Trio, violin, bass clarinet, piano, 1948
  - Duo, viola and cello, 1949 – Mobart Music Publications MOB 8550/Schott
  - Duo, violin and piano, 1949, rev. 1965 – Mobart Music Publications/Schott
  - Piano Quartet, 1950
  - String Quartet No. 2, 1950
  - Tripartita, solo violin, 1950
  - String Trio, 1961–63
  - Decadanse, for clarinet, bass clarinet, trumpet, trombone, violin, double bass, and percussion, 1972 – Mobart Music Publications/Schott
  - String Quartet No. 3 'on revient toujours', 1972–74 – Mobart Music Publications/Schott
  - Changes, for two sets of chimes, four players, 1974 – Mobart Music Publications/Schott
  - Notturno [String Quartet No. 5], double string quartet, 1995
  - String Quartet No. 6 'Anbruch–Einbruch–Abbruch', 1999
- Keyboard
  - Piano Sonata, 1945–46
  - 3 Small Pieces, piano, 1947
  - Fantasy and Fugue in Memoriam Arnold Schoenberg, organ, 1951 – Mobart Music Publications/Schott
  - Variations No. 1, piano, 1951
  - Sonatina, piano, 1952
  - Passacaglia, organ, 1953 - Mobart Music Publications/Schott
  - Variations No. 2, piano, 1959 – Mobart Music Publications MOB 8585/Schott
  - MONO/POLY, piano, 1994 (first performance Pasadena, 13 September 1994, by Leonard Stein
- Electroacoustic
  - In memoriam patris, tape, 1976
  - String Quartet No. 4 '(scordatura – trompe l'oreille)', string quartet, computer, 1977–78

== Writings ==
- Hoffmann, Richard, "Webern: Six Pieces, op. 6, 1909", Perspectives of New Music 6 (1967–68)
- Schoenberg, Arnold, Von heute auf morgen, Op. 32, edited by Richard Hoffmann, with Werner Bittinger. Mainz: B. Schott's Söhne; Wien: Universal Edition, 1970.
