= Joseph R. Wood =

American composer

Joseph Wood (May 12, 1915 – June 3, 2000) was an American composer and music educator. He was a faculty member at the Oberlin Conservatory of Music where he taught music theory and composition from 1950 until his retirement in 1985. He performed and conducted widely, and his compositions for piano, chamber groups, and orchestra were performed around the world.

== Life and career ==
Born in Pittsburgh, Pennsylvania, Wood attended Bucknell University from 1932–1934. Afterwards, he began his formal music training at the Juilliard Institute of Musical Arts where he received a diploma in piano performance in 1936. Impressed with his work, the Juilliard School offered him a full four-year Juilliard fellowship from 1936–40. He continued his piano studies with Bernard Wagenear, completing his bachelor's degree in 1949. In 1942 he won first prize for his opera The Mother in the Juilliard Opera Competition. On the basis of winning the opera prize he was given a Ditson Award from Columbia University, on which he lived and wrote music for a year. He went on to study composition with Otto Luening at Columbia University. He graduated with a M.A. in music composition in 1950.

During his time at Juilliard, Wood would periodically take time off from school to pursue other interests. He was the staff composer at the Chekov Theatre Studio in Manhattan from 1939–1941 where he wrote a wide variety of scores for many productions directed by Michael Chekhov. He also worked as a freelance composer and arranger in New York City from 1941–1943 and from 1946–1950. During this time period Wood was primarily working as a composer for radio and television commercials, writing many of the tunes Madison Avenue used to sell everything from soap to television dramas. He wrote charts for many dance bands, the most famous of which was his arrangement of "Chiquita Banana" that he did for Xavier Cugat. He also wrote many of the orchestral arrangements used for the first Muzak recordings.

From 1943–46, Wood joined the special services as a member of the U.S. Army, serving in the South Pacific during World War II. Fond of telling stories, Wood would later amuse friends with tales of his experiences in the army, especially those about the oddity of meeting many celebrities in remote and dangerous places like Okinawa and other "Pacific hotspots".

In 1950 Wood, under the invitation of David Robertson, became a faculty member at the Oberlin Conservatory of Music where he remained a teacher of music theory and composition until his retirement in 1985. Wood, along with Richard Hoffmann and Walter Aschaffenburg, initiated the conservatory major in composition in 1956. They also established the Oberlin Contemporary Music Festival, which was held in February of each year until 1971. It brought to the campus such distinguished composers as Roger Sessions, Wallingford Riegger, Ernst Krenek, Leon Kirchner, and, in 1963, Igor Stravinsky, as well as many outstanding performers and commentators.

Wood was a guest composer at the Villa Montalvo in 1957 and was awarded a Huntington Hartford fellowship in 1960, and was a fellow eight times at the MacDowell Colony. In 1966 and 1973 he received H. H. Powers travel grants from Oberlin College. He also worked with some of the 20th century’s best-known composers and musicians, including Frederick Loewe, of Lerner and Loewe. He arranged the choral music for Brigadoon and other Loewe works.

Wood's compositions were sought after by many musicians, and he received many commissions. He wrote numerous chamber music pieces including a piano trio in 1937 and a viola sonata in 1938. He also wrote four string quartets between 1942–1978 which have been performed by such notable ensembles as the NBC Quartet, the Gordon Quartet, the Piastro Quartet, and the New Hungarian Quartet. Other notable works include a violin sonata (1947) and a piano quintet (1956). Throughout his life he wrote a considerable number of choral pieces which are still being programmed, including a Te Deum written on the occasion of Oberlin's sesquicentennial for the Oberlin College Choir and Robert Fountain.

His symphony orchestra compositions include a Concerto for Chamber Orchestra, a Poem for Orchestra (1950), a Concerto for Viola and Piano with orchestra in 1970 premiered by the Cleveland Philharmonic Orchestra conducted by José Serebrier, a Violin Concerto and a Divertimento for Piano and small orchestra from 1959. He also wrote four symphonies, one each in 1939, 1952, 1956, and 1981. After the premiere of his third symphony in 1957, the critic of the New York Herald Tribune wrote that the work "was a thoroughly distinguished and handsome creation with such an internal and external appeal that it would be no exaggeration to place it in the very top rank of American symphonies." His Symphony No. 4 was premiered on May 8, 1981, by the Oberlin Orchestra, Robert Baustian, conducting. The NBC Symphony Orchestra premiered his Overture to Twelfth Night on the eve of Pearl Harbor. Arguably, his most important piece was a large ballet-cantata commissioned by the Draco Foundation and written to a scenario by Evelyn Eaton entitled The Progression.

Joseph Wood died in Auburn, Alabama, on June 3, 2000. He is survived by his two daughters, Lynne and Lorna, and four grandchildren.
