= Barry Goldberg (volleyball coach) =

American volleyball coach (1962–2023)

Barry Goldberg (February 21, 1962 – March 25, 2023) was an American volleyball coach. He was head coach of the women's team at the American University.

== Early life and education ==
Goldberg grew up in Pittsburgh and attended Peabody High School, where he played volleyball and golf. After graduating from Peabody High School, Goldberg attended the University of Pittsburgh where he played on the Pittsburgh Panthers men's volleyball until it was discontinued in 1983. As a result, Goldberg served as a player-coach for the club team during his senior year and then served as an assistant coach on the Pittsburgh Panthers women's volleyball team after he earned his Bachelor of Arts.

== Coaching career ==
After completing his master’s degree in counselling education, Goldberg accepted a position as a drug rehabilitation counselor while working part-time as the American University volleyball coach. However, he was eventually promoted to head coach after the American University Eagles had four dismal seasons. In his first season as head coach, the Eagles earned a 15-6, 15-9, 15-5 win record over Clarion University of Pennsylvania. At the conclusion of the 1989 season, Goldberg's Eagles amassed a 25-11 record and he was named 1999 Colonial Athletic Association Coach of the Year. Prior to the Eagles joining the Patriot League, Goldberg would win the Coach of the Year title two more times in 1997 and 2000. Once the team moved to the Patriot League division in 2001, Goldberg helped the Eagles win 64 matches and four NCAA Tournaments to claim 400 wins by 2005.

By 2016, Goldberg led the Eagles to 14 Patriot League tournament championships as he earned his 700th win as head coach and was named Patriot League Coach of the Year. The following year, he signed a five-year contract extension to stay with the Eagles. Three years later, he helped the team earn their 16th Patriot League Championship under his leadership and first since 2011.

Goldberg is the winningest coach in American University history, with 812 career victories. In February 2026, the university honored his legacy by dedicating the Barry Goldberg Court within the Alan and Amy Meltzer Center for Athletic Performance.

== Personal life and death ==
Goldberg and his wife Bonnie had three children together who are also involved in athletics.

Goldberg died from cancer on March 25, 2023, at the age of 61.
