= Pittsburgh Panthers =

Athletic teams of the University of Pittsburgh

- University: University of Pittsburgh
- Nickname: Panthers
- NCAA: Division I (FBS)
- Conference: Atlantic Coast Conference
- Athletic director: Allen Greene
- Location: Pittsburgh, Pennsylvania
- Varsity teams: 17
- Football stadium: Acrisure Stadium
- Basketball arena: Petersen Events Center
- Baseball stadium: Charles L. Cost Field
- Softball stadium: Vartabedian Field
- Soccer stadium: Ambrose Urbanic Field
- Aquatics center: Trees Pool
- Volleyball arena: Fitzgerald Field House
- Colors: Blue and gold
- Mascot: "ROC" the Panther
- Fight song: Hail to Pitt; Pitt Victory Song
- Website: pittsburghpanthers.com
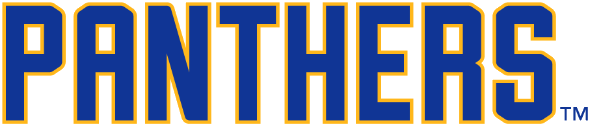

Atlantic Coast Conference logo in Pittsburgh's colors

The Pittsburgh Panthers, commonly also referred to as the Pitt Panthers, are the athletic teams representing the University of Pittsburgh, although the term is colloquially used to refer to other aspects of the university such as alumni, faculty, and students. Pitt fields 17 university-sponsored varsity teams at the NCAA Division I level (FBS for football), in the Atlantic Coast Conference.

Varsity men's sports sponsored by the university are baseball, basketball, cross country, football, soccer, swimming and diving, track and field (indoor and outdoor), and wrestling; while sponsored women's varsity sports include basketball, cross country, gymnastics, lacrosse, soccer, softball, swimming and diving, track and field (indoor and outdoor), and volleyball.

The university's athletic program is one of only five current NCAA Division I FBS schools to have won multiple national championships in both football (9) and basketball (2), and the Panthers have been ranked as having among the best combinations of football and basketball programs by multiple publications. Other sports have won a variety of conference titles, regularly compete in NCAA championship events and have produced a plethora of professional and Olympic athletes.

== Department of Athletics ==
The University of Pittsburgh Department of Athletics administers the 17 men's and women's varsity sports teams, as well as the spirit groups such as the Pitt Band and Pitt Cheerleaders. The Athletic Department also provides student-athlete academic support, the Panther Game Plan student-athlete life skills program, athletic training, marketing, development, media relations, and other support and administrative services and divisions.

=== Achievements ===
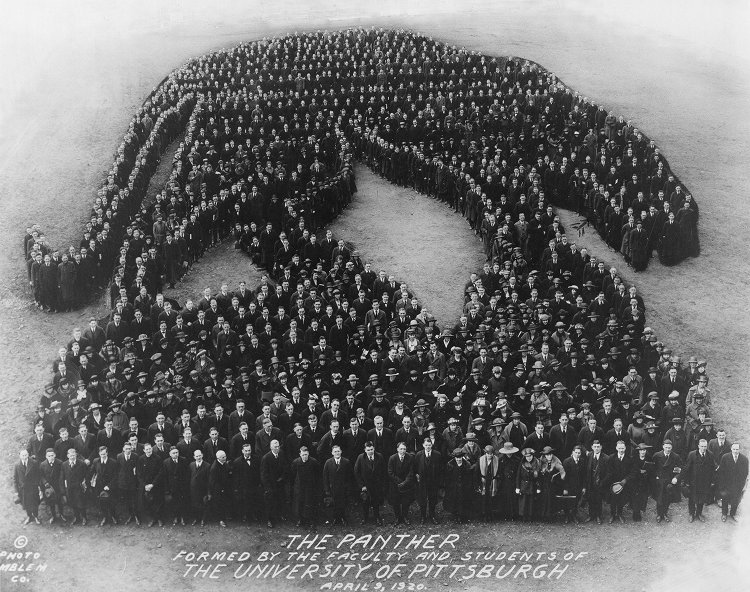
"The Living Panther", nearly 5,000 University of Pittsburgh students and faculty members assembled to form the shape of the Pitt Panther on April 9, 1920

The university's athletic program is one of only five current NCAA Division 1A schools to have won multiple national championships in both football (9) and basketball (2), and the Panthers have been ranked as having among the best combinations of football and basketball programs by multiple publications. Pitt was ranked as having the fifth best combination of football and basketball programs in CBSSports.com's Flourishing Five ranking in 2010.

In its "Hoops & Helmets" list of the best combinations, CollegeFootballNews.com ranked Pitt ninth in 2011, fifth in 2010, third in 2009, 30th in 2007, 26th in 2006, 12th in 2005, fourth in 2004, and third in 2003.

Pitt was also ranked 19th for the best combined football and basketball programs during the BCS era and among the top 25 between 1974 and 2008 by Rivals.com. In addition, ESPN.com used the Sagarin mathematical system to rate universities based on the strength of their performance in football and men's basketball for five years through 2006 and found Pitt was tied for 10th as one of the nation's top two-sport schools. Further, in a 2006 all-sports ranking done by Sports Illustrated on Campus, Pitt was ranked 17th among all of the country's universities in terms of the overall strength of its athletic program. In 2022-2023, Pitt's athletic department tied for 13th in CBS Sports' Best in College Sports ranking.

=== Varsity sports ===
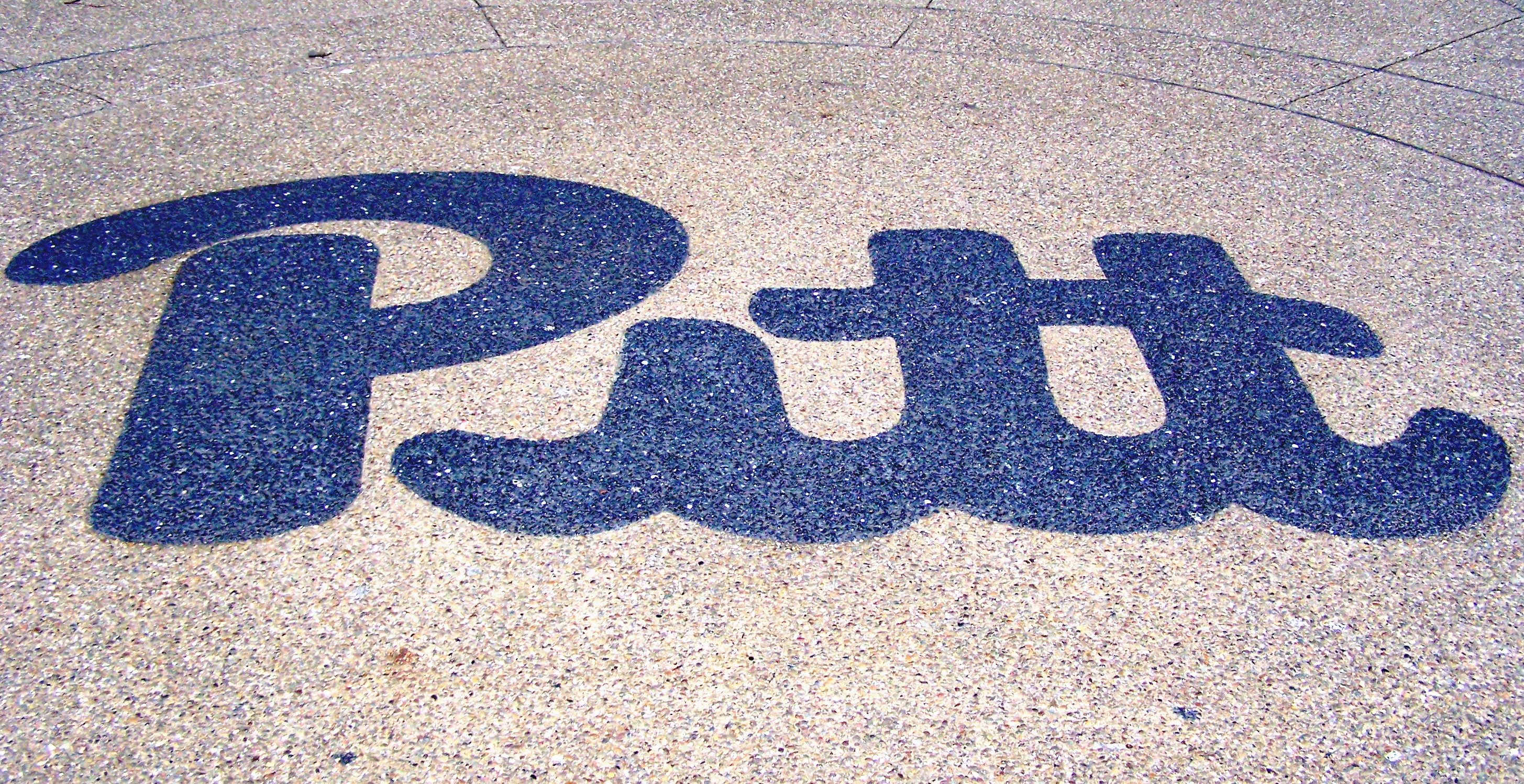
The "script Pitt" logo, seen here embedded in the plaza outside of the William Pitt Union, has served as the primary logo since 1973 except for a period between 1997 and 2016

Men's sports	Women's sports
Baseball	Basketball
Basketball	Cross country
Cross country	Gymnastics
Football	Lacrosse
Soccer	Soccer
Swimming and diving	Softball
Track and field^{†}	Swimming and diving
Wrestling	Track and field^{†}
	Volleyball
^{†} – includes both indoor and outdoor.

The University of Pittsburgh sponsors in 19 varsity sports in NCAA Division I (Division I FBS for football), the highest competitive level of intercollegiate athletics in the United States. All Pitt varsity sports teams compete in the Atlantic Coast Conference (ACC).

==== Baseball ====
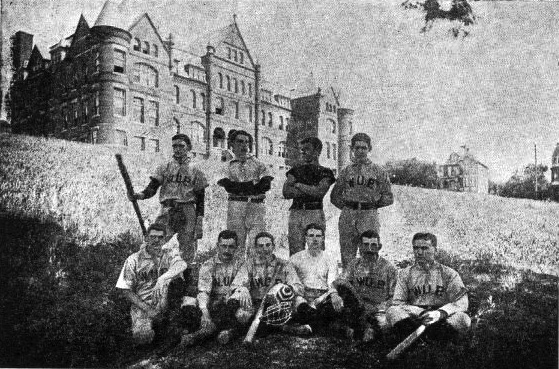
Pitt baseball circa the 1890s

Baseball, Pitt's oldest varsity sport started in 1869 and has produced multiple All-Americans, Major League Baseball players, and was a regular threat in the Big East baseball tournament championship. The baseball team was ranked in the top 25 during several of the past seasons and moved into a new facility, the Charles L. Cost Field at the Petersen Sports Complex, in 2011. Pitt baseball is coached by Mike Bell.

NCAA tournament appearances (3): 1959, 1965, 1995
Conference Championships: Tournament (1): 1995; Regular Season (1): 1994

==== Basketball ====
===== Men's basketball =====
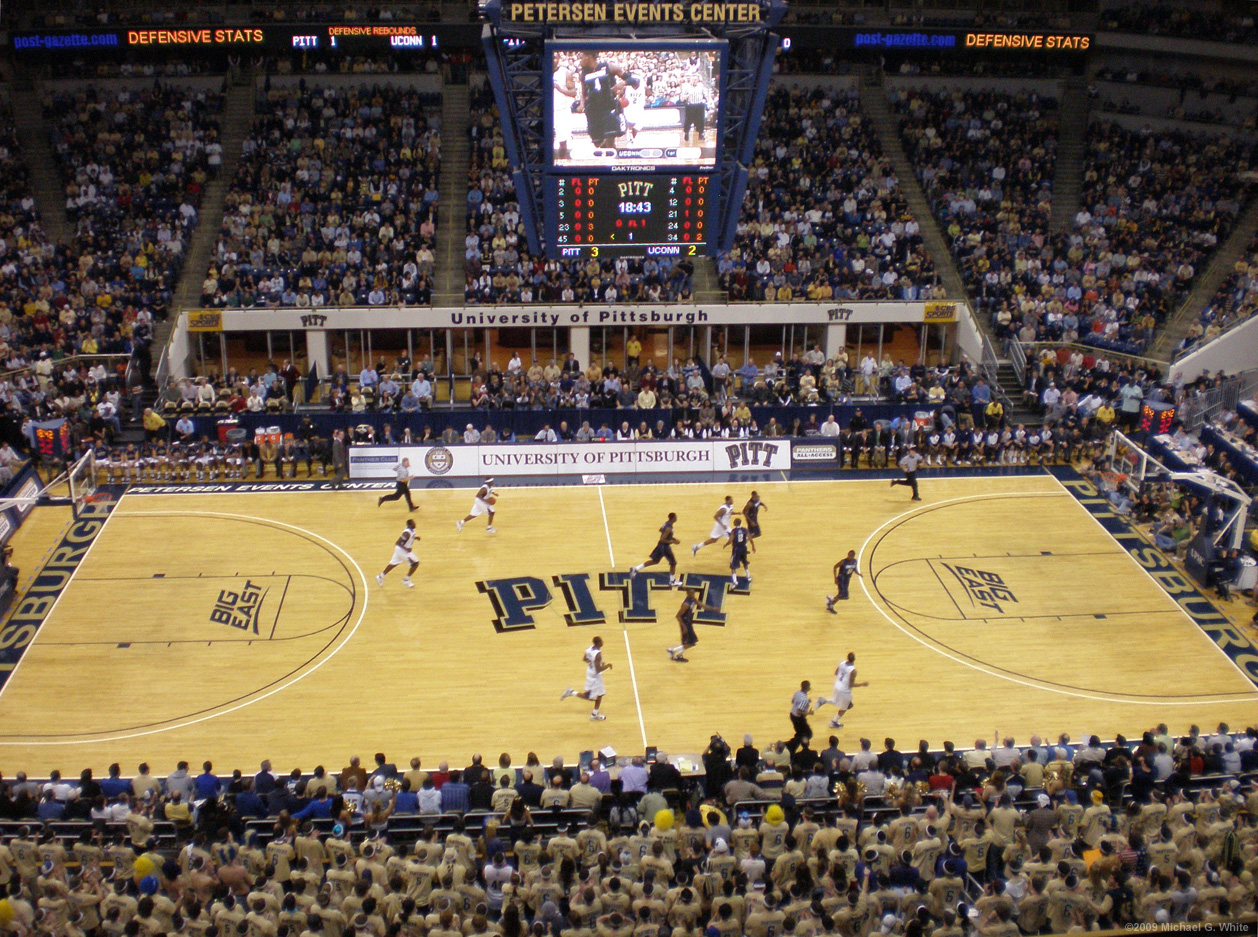
A Pitt men's basketball game at the Petersen Events Center in 2009

Pitt began playing men's basketball in 1905 and soon become a national power. In the era preceding the initiation of national tournaments, the Panthers were both contemporaneously and later retroactively, by the Helms Athletic Foundation (1927–28 and 1929–30) and the Premo-Porretta Power Poll (1927–28), regarded as national champions. Those teams, coached by the innovative Naismith Hall of Fame inductee "Doc" Carlson, were led by National Player of the Year and Hall of Famer Charlie Hyatt. Following a Final Four appearance in 1941, Pitt appeared in a handful of NCAA tournaments throughout the 1950s, 1960s, and 1970s, including an Elite Eight appearance in 1974 led by All-American Billy Knight. Pitt entered the Big East Conference in 1982, and by the end of the decade had secured a pair of Big East regular season championships led by All-Americans Charles Smith and Jerome Lane. The last decade has been an era of consistent national and conference competitiveness that included 10 straight NCAA tournament appearances with five Sweet 16 appearances and an Elite Eight appearance in 2009. In total, Pitt has 25 NCAA appearances, seven Sweet Sixteen appearances, 10 conference regular season championships, four conference tournament championships, ten conference tournament championship game appearances, and 37 players drafted to play professionally with the most recent being Sam Young and DeJuan Blair. Pitt men's basketball plays its home games at the Petersen Events Center and is coached by Jeff Capel.

National Championships (2 Helms): 1927–28, 1929–30 (23–2)
NCAA Final Four (1): 1941; Elite Eight (3): 1941, 1974, 2009; Sweet Sixteen (7): 1957, 1974, 2002, 2003, 2004, 2007, 2009
NCAA tournament appearances (27): 1941, 1957, 1958, 1963, 1974, 1981, 1982, 1985, 1987, 1988, 1989, 1991, 1993, 2002, 2003, 2004, 2005, 2006, 2007, 2008, 2009, 2010, 2011, 2013, 2014, 2016, 2023
NIT appearances (9): 1964, 1975, 1980, 1984, 1986, 1992, 1997, 2001, 2015
Conference Championships: Tournament (4): 1981, 1982, 2003, 2008; Regular Season (10): 1933, 1934, 1935, 1937, 1987, 1988, 2002, 2003, 2004, 2011

===== Women's basketball =====
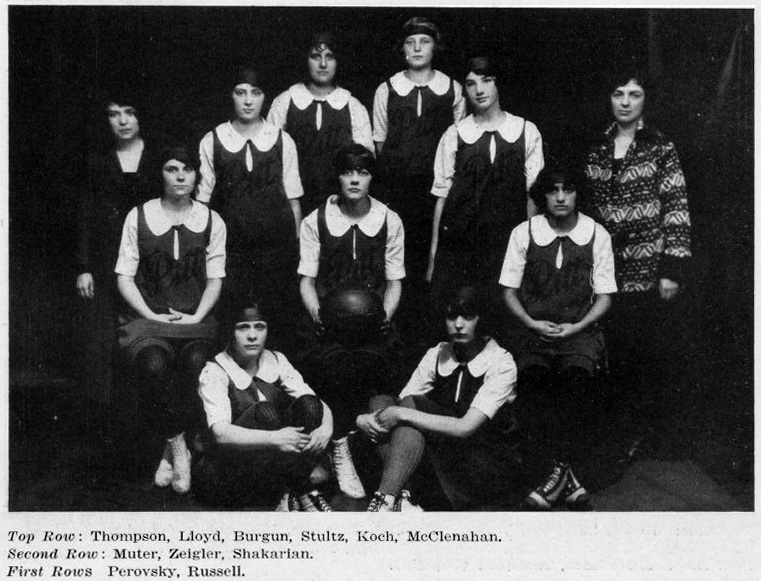
The undefeated 1924–25 Pitt women's varsity basketball team

The Pittsburgh Panthers women's varsity basketball program started during the 1914–1915 school year and lasted until 1927 before going on hiatus until 1970. Pitt's women's team has posted several NCAA, NWIT, and EAIAW regional tournament appearances. Between 2006 and 2010, Pitt has appeared in the national rankings and advanced to five straight post-season tournaments. Included in that stretch are three NCAA tournament bids which resulted in Sweet Sixteen appearances in 2008 and 2009. Pitt women's basketball plays its home games at the Petersen Events Center and is coached by Robin Harmony.

NCAA Sweet Sixteen (2): 2008, 2009
NCAA tournament appearances (4): 2007, 2008, 2009, 2015
NWIT/WNIT appearances (5): 1981, 1994, 2000, 2006, 2010
Conference Championships: Regular Season (1): 1984

==== Cross country ====
Men's and women's cross country at Pitt host home meets at adjacent Schenley Park and is overseen by head coach Alonzo Webb with distance assistant Adam Bray.

Men's NCAA Top Ten finishes (3): 1951, 1953, 1954
Men's NCAA championship appearances (7): 1951, 1953, 1954, 1964, 1970, 1975, 1990
Men's IC4A Championships (2): 1924, 1955

==== Football ====
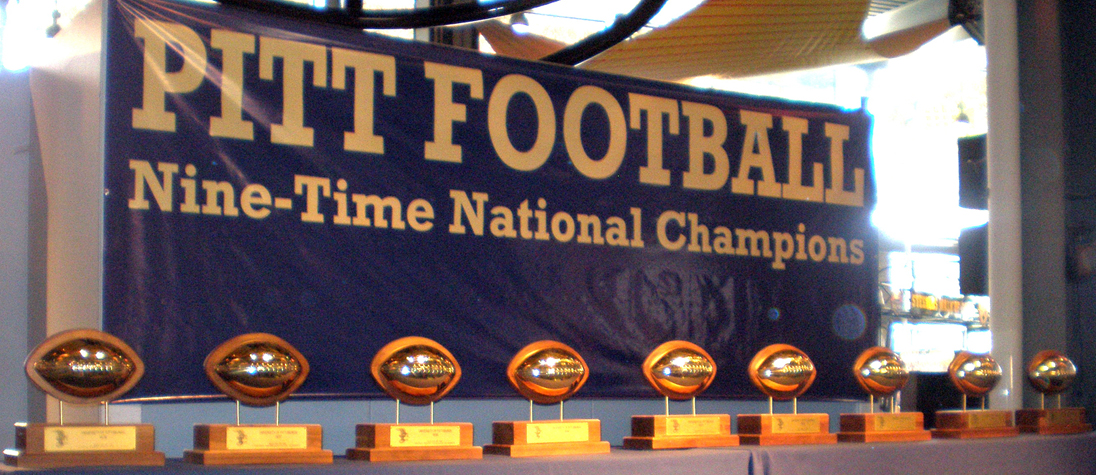
Pitt football claims nine football National Championships

Traditionally the most popular sport at the University of Pittsburgh, football has been played at the highest levels at the university since 1889. During the more than 125 years of competitive football at Pitt, the university has helped pioneer the sport by, among other things, instituting the use of numbers on jerseys, having the first live radio broadcast of a college football game, and desegregating the Sugar Bowl. Some of football's all-time greatest coaches and players have plied their trade at Pitt, including Pop Warner, Jock Sutherland, Marshall Goldberg, Joe Schmidt, Mike Ditka, Tony Dorsett, Hugh Green, Mark May, Dan Marino, Bill Fralic, Curtis Martin, Larry Fitzgerald, Darrelle Revis, Aaron Donald, and LeSean McCoy. Among the top schools in terms of all-time wins, Pitt teams have claimed nine national championships and boast 87 players that have been chosen as first-team All-Americans. Pitt football plays its home games at Acrisure Stadium and has practice facilities located at the UPMC Sports Performance Complex. Pitt football is currently coached by Pat Narduzzi.

National Championships (9 claimed): 1915, 1916, 1918, 1929, 1931, 1934, 1936, 1937, 1976
Undefeated seasons (8): 1904, 1910, 1915, 1916, 1917, 1920, 1937, 1976
Eastern and Conference Championships (14): 1925, 1927, 1929, 1931, 1932, 1934, 1936, 1937, 1955, 1976, 1979, 1980, 2004, 2010, 2021
Conference Division Championships (1): 2018, 2021
Bowl appearances (39): Sun (5), Rose (4), Fiesta (4), Sugar (3), Gator (3), Birmingham (3), Insight (2), Mayo/Tire/Car Care (2), Military (2), GameAbove Sports (2), Peach (1), Cotton (1), Tangerine (1947–1982) (1), Tangerine (2001–2003) (1), Liberty (1), Pinstripe (1), Armed Forces (1), Little Caesars (1), Bluebonnet (1)

==== Gymnastics ====
Pitt women's gymnastics has qualified for the NCAA Regional Championship in twenty different season. Pitt is one of only 22 schools in the nation to claim an individual national champion, Lisa Shirk who won the uneven bars in 1982. Pitt competed in the East Atlantic Gymnastics League from 1995 until 2022 when the ACC began sponsor women's gymnastics beginning in the 2023 season. Pitt Gymnastics hosts home meets at Fitzgerald Field House, has a Gymnastics Training Center at the adjacent Trees Hall, and is led by head coach Casey Jo MacPherson.

AIAW / NCAA national championship appearances (2): 1979, 1981
Individual National Champions: 1
EAIAW / NCAA regional championship appearances (22): 1981, 1982, 1986, 1987, 1988, 1989, 1990, 1991, 1993, 1995, 1996, 1997, 1998, 1999, 2000, 2002, 2003, 2005, 2006, 2007, 2013, 2018
Conference Championships (1): 2016

==== Lacrosse ====
Pitt announced that it will field a varsity women's lacrosse team beginning with the 2021–22 season. Women's lacrosse currently exists as a club sport program at the university and has had significant success at that level including winning the club sport national championship in 2014 and 2019 and finishing as the national runner up in 2017.

==== Men's soccer ====
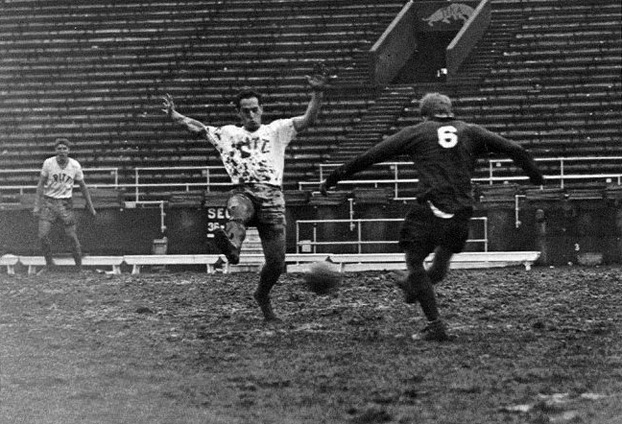
Pitt soccer in action during the first round of the 1965 NCAA tournament

Men's soccer is coached by Jay Vidovich. The team moved into a new facility, Ambrose Urbanic Field at the Petersen Sports Complex, in the spring of 2011. It advanced to the NCAA College Cup (Final Four) during the 2020 and 2022 seasons (the 2020 season NCAA tournament was played in May 2021 due to COVID-19).

Men's NCAA College Cup (final four) (2): 2020, 2022; Elite Eight (5): 1962, 2020, 2021, 2022, 2024; Sweet Sixteen (5): 1965, 2020, 2021, 2022, 2024
Men's NCAA tournament appearances (8): 1962, 1965, 2019, 2020, 2021, 2022, 2023, 2024
Men's Conference Championships: Regular Season (4): 1981, 1985, 2024
Men's Conference Division Championships (2): 2020-21, 2021

==== Women's soccer ====
Pittsburgh Panthers women's soccer is currently coached by Randy Waldrum and was established in 1996. The team also plays home games at Ambrose Urbanic Field at the Petersen Sports Complex. The team qualified for the NCAA and ACC Tournaments for the first time in 2022, but lost in the Sweet 16 in the NCAA tournament and the second round of the ACC Tournament. They also participated in the Big East Conference Women's Soccer Tournament when the Panthers were part of the Big East Conference.

Women's NCAA Elite Eight (1): 2023; Sweet Sixteen (2): 2022, 2023
Women's NCAA tournament appearances (2): 2022, 2023

==== Softball ====
Softball was founded as a varsity sport at Pitt in 1998 and entered the Big East in 1999 and ACC for the 2013–14 season. In 2011, Pitt won a program record 34 games in a single record en route to a team record third straight winning season and was the ACC tournament runner-up in 2015. The team moved into a new softball facility, Vartabedian Field at the Petersen Sports Complex, in 2011. Pitt softball was coached by Jenny Allard.

NCAA tournament appearances (1): 2015
Conference Championships: Regular Season (1): 2018

==== Swimming and diving ====
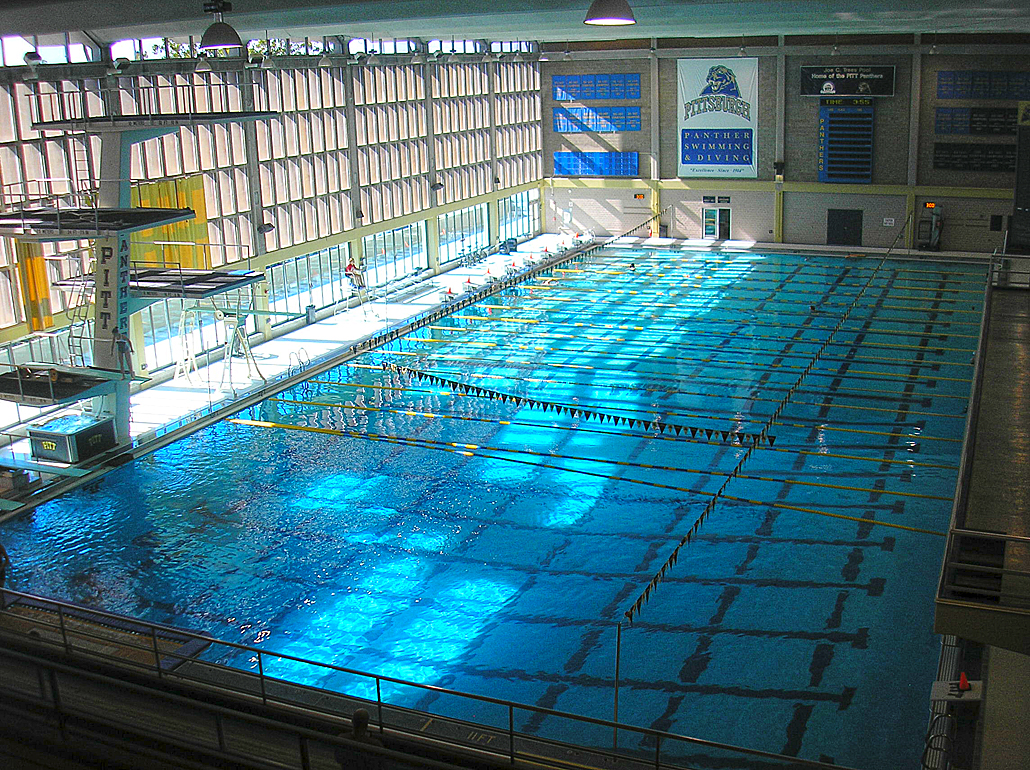
Pitt Swimming and Diving competes in Trees Pool

Pitt's Swimming and Diving teams have produced several Olympians and dominated the Big East Conference having won 19 men's and 9 women's Big East Championships while a member of that conference between 1983 and 2013. The Swimming and Diving teams train and compete at Trees Pool. The men's team first competed in 1913 while the women's team was founded in 1974. Both men's and women's swimming are coached by Chase Kreitler while diving is coached by Katie Hazelton.

Men's NCAA championship appearances, team scored (25): 1938, 1953, 1954, 1977, 1979, 1980, 1981, 1989, 1990, 1991, 1994, 1995, 1997, 2000, 2002, 2003, 2004, 2007, 2008, 2016, 2017, 2021, 2023, 2024, 2025
Individual National Champions: 1
Men's Conference Championships (41): 1934, 1938, 1940, 1952, 1953, 1954, 1955, 1956, 1959, 1961, 1962, 1963, 1964, 1965, 1966, 1967, 1976, 1977, 1978, 1979, 1980, 1981, 1983, 1984, 1985, 1986, 1987, 1988, 1989, 1990, 1991, 1992, 1994, 1997, 1998, 1999, 2000, 2001, 2002, 2003, 2004

Women's NCAA championship appearances, team scored (16): 1983, 1984, 1985, 1986, 1987, 1994, 1995, 1996, 1997, 1999, 2000, 2003, 2015, 2016, 2017, 2025
Individual National Champions (AIAW): 1
Women's Conference Championships (10): 1979, 1983, 1984, 1985, 1986, 1987, 1988, 1989, 1990, 1991

==== Track and field ====
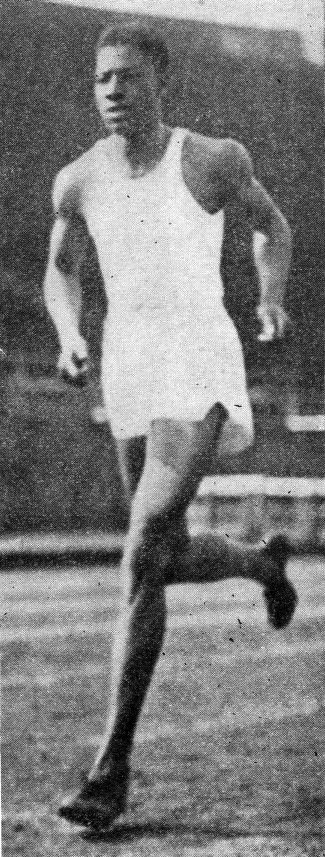
Olympic gold medal winner John Woodruff is part of Pitt's tradition in Track and Field

In track and field, Pitt has produced several Olympic and NCAA champions such as 800m Olympic gold medalist John Woodruff, two-time 110m hurdle Olympic gold medalist Roger Kingdom, and 7-time NCAA champion and 2005 World Champion triple jumper Trecia-Kaye Smith. Pitt track and field is coached by Alonzo Webb.

At the NCAA Indoor Track and Field Championships, the Pitt men have finished as high as fifth place, while the Pitt women have finished as high as third.

Men's NCAA Indoor Top Ten finishes (4): 1971, 1986, 1987, 1988
Men's NCAA Indoor championship appearances, team scored (18): 1970, 1971, 1972, 1973, 1974, 1976, 1982, 1983, 1984, 1985, 1986, 1987, 1988, 1991, 2007, 2008, 2012, 2014, 2021
Men's Indoor Individual National Champions: 6
Men's Indoor Conference Championships (1): 1987

Women's NCAA Indoor Top Ten finishes (4): 1995, 1997, 1998, 1999
Women's NCAA Indoor championship appearances, team scored (12): 1993, 1994, 1995, 1996, 1997, 1998, 1999, 2000, 2001, 2005, 2006, 2023
Women's Indoor Individual National Champions: 7
Women's Indoor ECAC Championships (3): 2001, 2004, 2005; Conference Championships (3): 1989, 1999, 2005

At the NCAA Outdoor Track and Field Championships, the Pitt men have finished as high as 8th place, while the Pitt women have finished as high as 9th.

Men's NCAA Outdoor Top Ten finishes (2): 1928, 1929
Men's NCAA Outdoor championship appearances, team scored (32): 1921, 1928, 1929, 1930, 1937, 1938, 1939, 1940, 1942, 1946, 1950, 1954, 1956, 1963, 1965, 1968, 1970, 1971, 1972, 1973, 1974, 1983, 1986, 1987, 1989, 1990, 1991, 2006, 2013, 2014, 2015, 2017
Men's Outdoor Individual National Champions: 12
Men's Outdoor IC4A Championships (2): 1940, 2014; Conference Championships (2): 1989, 1994

Women's NCAA Outdoor Top Ten finishes (2): 1994, 1999
Women's NCAA Outdoor championship appearances, team scored (13): 1990, 1991, 1992, 1993, 1994, 1995, 1996, 1997, 1998, 1999, 2000, 2005, 2006
Women's Outdoor Individual National Champions: 3
Women's Outdoor ECAC Championships (4): 2003, 2004, 2005, 2006; Conference Championships (5): 1990, 1991, 1994, 2005, 2006

==== Volleyball ====
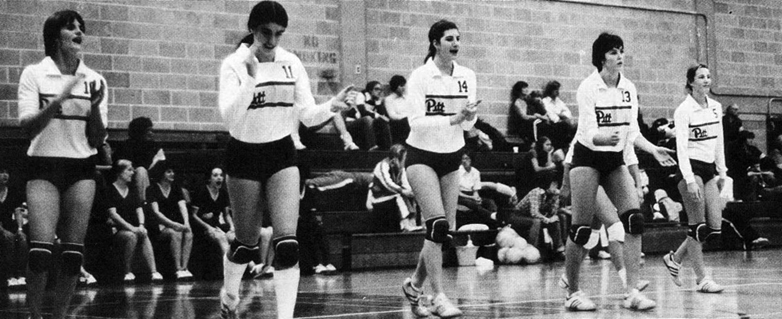
Pitt volleyball won more Big East Conference volleyball tournament championships than any other team

The Pitt volleyball program was established in 1974, and since that time the Panthers have one of the nation's top all-time winning percentages, appearances in 23 national championship tournaments, and won 16 conference championships while a member of the Big East and ACC. Pitt volleyball host home matches at the Fitzgerald Field House and is coached by Dan Fisher.

NCAA Final Four (5) 2021, 2022, 2023, 2024, 2025; NCAA Elite Eight (6): 2020–21, 2021, 2022, 2023, 2024, 2025; AIAW / NCAA Sweet Sixteen (9): 1978, 1981, 1990, 2020–21, 2021, 2022, 2023, 2024, 2025
AIAW / NCAA tournament appearances (24): 1978, 1979, 1981, 1982, 1984, 1986, 1987, 1990, 1991, 1992, 1993, 1994, 2003, 2004, 2016, 2017, 2018, 2019, 2020–21, 2021, 2022, 2023, 2024, 2025
NIVC tournament appearances (2): 1989, 1995
Conference Championships: Tournament (11): 1982, 1984, 1986, 1988, 1989, 1990, 1991, 1992, 1993, 1994, 2003; Regular Season (13): 1990, 1991, 1992, 1993, 1994, 2003, 2017, 2018, 2019, 2022, 2023, 2024, 2025

==== Wrestling ====
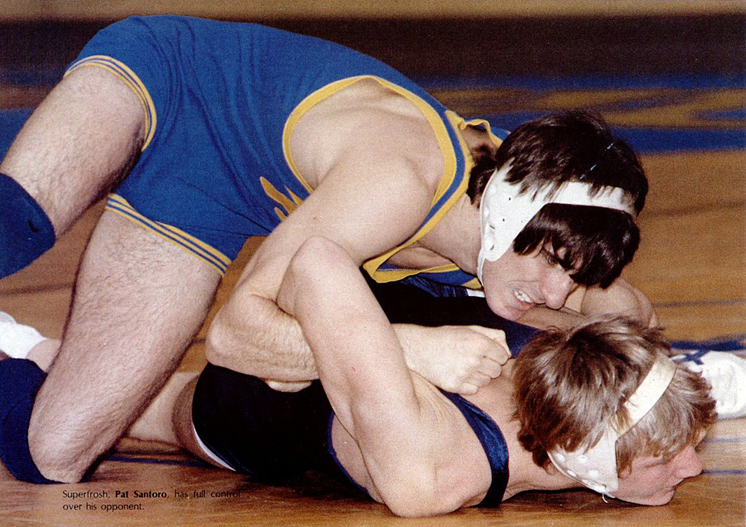
Pat Santoro was a four-time All-American and two-time national champion at 142 pounds for Pitt wrestling

The wrestling program has a rich history having finishing second at the NCAA Championships twice and in the top ten 13 times, being 15th in the number of all-time individual national champions with 16, and boasting 81 All-American wrestlers throughout its history. Pitt competes in the ACC but formerly was a member of the Eastern Wrestling League and before that, the Eastern Intercollegiate Wrestling Association. Pitt wrestling hosts home meets at Fitzgerald Field House and is coached by Keith Gavin.

NCAA runner-up (2): 1954, 1957; Top Ten finishes (13): 1952, 1953, 1954, 1955, 1956, 1957, 1958, 1959, 1960, 1961, 1962, 1963, 1970
NCAA championship appearances, team scored (70): 1952, 1953, 1954, 1955, 1956, 1957, 1958, 1959, 1960, 1961, 1962, 1963, 1964, 1965, 1966, 1968, 1969, 1970, 1971, 1972, 1973, 1974, 1975, 1976, 1977, 1978, 1979, 1982, 1983, 1984, 1985, 1986, 1987, 1988, 1989, 1990, 1991, 1992, 1993, 1994, 1995, 1996, 1997, 1998, 1999, 2000, 2001, 2002, 2003, 2004, 2005, 2006, 2007, 2008, 2009, 2010, 2011, 2012, 2013, 2014, 2015, 2016, 2017, 2018, 2019, 2021, 2022, 2023, 2024, 2025
Individual National Champions: 17
Conference Champions: Tournament (6): 1954, 1955, 1956, 1960, 2011, 2012, 2013; Regular Season (5): 2010, 2011, 2012, 2014, 2023

==== Previous varsity sports and conference affiliations ====
University-sponsored varsity sports that no longer exist at Pitt included men's teams in boxing, fencing, golf, ice hockey, gymnastics, rifle, tennis, volleyball (1979–1983), and water polo; as well as women's field hockey and tennis.

NCAA championship event participation for these programs is as follows.

Men's golf NCAA championship appearances (1): 1958
Men's gymnastics NCAA championship appearances (8): 1956, 1957, 1958, 1959, 1960, 1961, 1962, 1963
Men's gymnastics Individual National Champions: 2
Men's water polo NCAA championship appearances (1): 1976

Pitt's athletic teams have competed as independents or in various conferences throughout their history. Football competed as an independent until the formation of the Big East Football Conference in 1991 in which it remained a member through the 2012 season. Pitt's men's ice hockey team competed in the Intercollegiate League beginning with the 1909–1910 season. Pitt men's basketball competed in the Eastern Intercollegiate Conference from 1932–33 to 1938–39 and in the Eastern 8 conference from 1976–77 to 1981–82 before joining the Big East in at the beginning of the 1982–83 season and in which it competed through the 2012–13 season. Women's basketball also joined the Big East in 1982–83, having competed previously as an independent. Baseball joined the Big East when the conference began sponsoring the sport in the spring of 1985. Men's soccer entered the Big East in fall of 1985. The women's soccer program began play in 1996 as an independent and entered the Big East in 1997. Softball began play in 1998 as an independent and entered the Big East in 1999. All of Pitt's Big East sports transitioned to the ACC beginning in the 2013–14 season. Pitt's men's gymnastic team competed in the Intercollegiate Gymnastic League. Pitt wrestling competed in the Eastern Intercollegiate Wrestling Association until it entered the Eastern Wrestling League in 1976 where it competed before moving into the ACC in 2013–14. The men's swimming and diving team previously competed in the Eastern Collegiate Swimming Association.

=== Scholar athletes ===
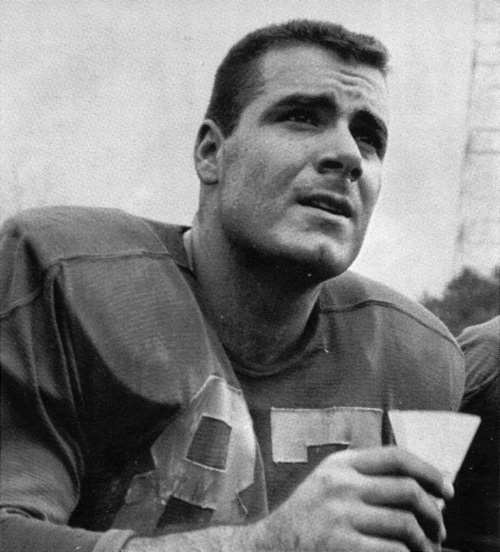
Joe Walton was both a First Team Athletic and Academic All-American in 1956

Each year the university honors student-athletes who have achieved academic success during the University of Pittsburgh Scholar-Athlete Awards Breakfast where it hands out Blue and Gold awards to student-athletes who have earned over a 3.0 GPA. The 2012 calendar year, Pitt's last competing in the Big East Conference, out of approximately 450 Pitt athletes, 350 achieved a GPA of 3.0 or above, with 16 earning a perfect 4.0. In addition, 148 student-athletes were named as Big East Academic All-Stars and 26 members of the football team were named to the all-academic Big East football team. This does not include 15 additional athletes from the wrestling and gymnastics teams that compete in other conferences. In 2010, volleyball standout Meagan Dooley was named the Big East Female Scholar-Athlete of the Year, the university's seventh male or female Big East scholar-athlete of the year winner since the award was instituted in 1985. Dooley was also awarded one of 87 NCAA Postgraduate Scholarships for women in 2010.

=== Hall of Fame ===
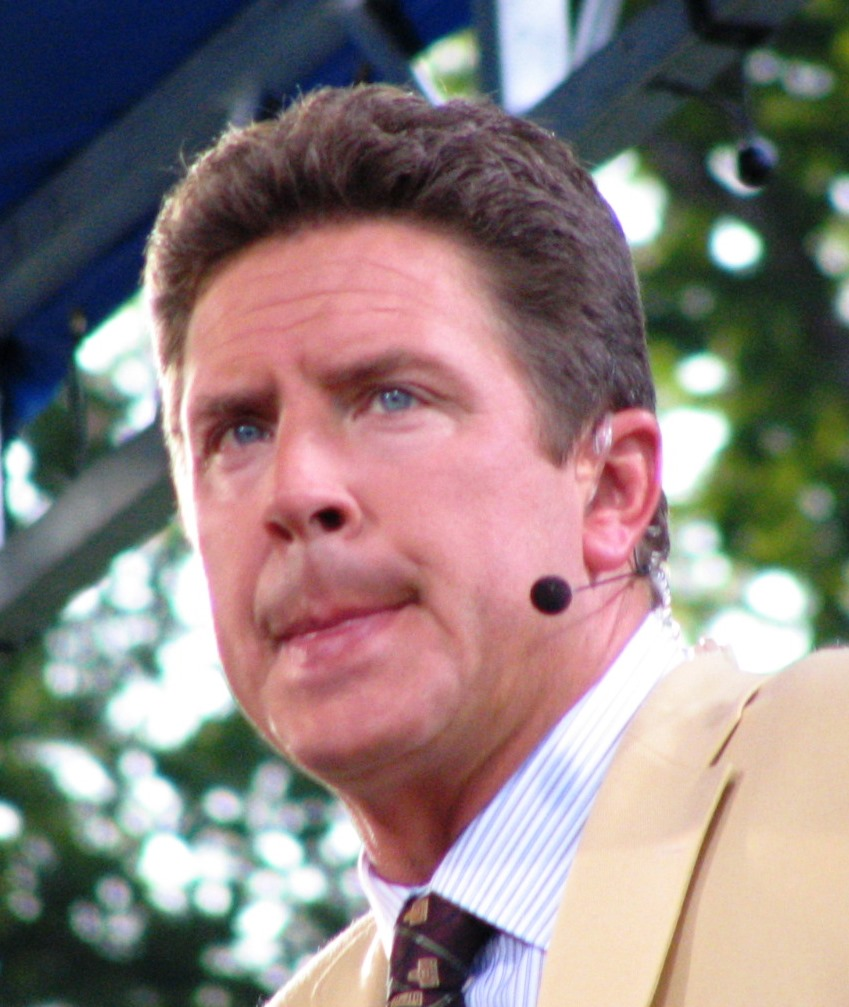
Hall of Fame quarterback Dan Marino played at Pitt from 1979 to 1982

The inaugural class of the Pitt Hall of Fame was inducted on September 7, 2018.

Inductees
Name	Sport(s)	Role	Year
Jennifer Bruce	Basketball	Athlete	2020
Doc Carlson	Basketball, Football, Baseball; Basketball	Athlete; Coach	2018
Sam Clancy	Basketball	Athlete	2019
Jimbo Covert	Football	Athlete	2019
Keisha Demas	Track & Field	Athlete	2022
Mike Ditka	Football	Athlete	2018
Tony Dorsett	Football	Athlete	2018
Herb Douglas	Track & Field	Athlete	2018
Chantee Earl	Track & Field	Athlete	2020
Najuma Fletcher	Track & Field	Athlete	2019
Bill Fralic	Football	Athlete	2018
Marshall Goldberg	Football	Athlete	2018
Hugh Green	Football	Athlete	2018
Bobby Grier	Football	Athlete	2020
Russ Grimm	Football	Athlete	2022
Larry Harris	Basketball	Athlete	2022
Don Hennon	Basketball	Athlete	2019
Sue Heon	Swimming & Diving	Athlete	2019
Craig Heyward	Football	Athlete	2020
Charley Hyatt	Basketball	Athlete	2019
Rickey Jackson	Football	Athlete	2022
Lorri Johnson	Basketball	Athlete	2019
Roger Kingdom	Track & Field	Athlete	2018
Billy Knight	Basketball	Athlete	2018
Brandin Knight	Basketball	Athlete; Coach	2020
Jerome Lane	Basketball	Athlete	2022
Debbie Lewis	Basketball	Athlete	2022
Angela López	Swimming	Athlete	2022
Ann Marie Lucanie	Volleyball	Athlete	2020
Ken Macha	Baseball	Athlete	2020
Johnny Majors	Football	Coach	2019
Dan Marino	Football	Athlete	2018
Curtis Martin	Football	Athlete	2020
Mark May	Football	Athlete	2019
Lee McRae	Track & Field	Athlete	2019
Bob Peck	Football	Athlete	2020
Ed Perry	Wrestling	Athlete	2019
Hugh Perry	Wrestling	Athlete	2019
Rex Perry	Wrestling	Coach	2019
Jerry Richey	Track & Field	Athlete	2022
Donna DeMarino Sanft	Gymnastics	Coach; Administrator; Athlete	2020
Pat Santoro	Wrestling	Athlete	2020
Joe Schmidt	Football	Athlete	2019
Jackie Sherrill	Football	Coach	2020
Lisa Shirk	Gymnastics	Athlete	2018
Charles Smith	Basketball	Athlete	2018
Trecia-Kaye Smith	Track & Field	Athlete	2018
Arnie Sowell	Track & Field	Athlete	2020
Kathy Stetler	Swimming & Diving	Athlete	2018
Rande Stottlemyer	Wrestling	Coach; Athlete	2022
Jock Sutherland	Football	Athlete; Coach	2018
Pop Warner	Football	Athlete; Coach	2020
John Woodruff	Track & Field	Athlete	2018

=== Spirit groups ===
==== Pitt Band ====
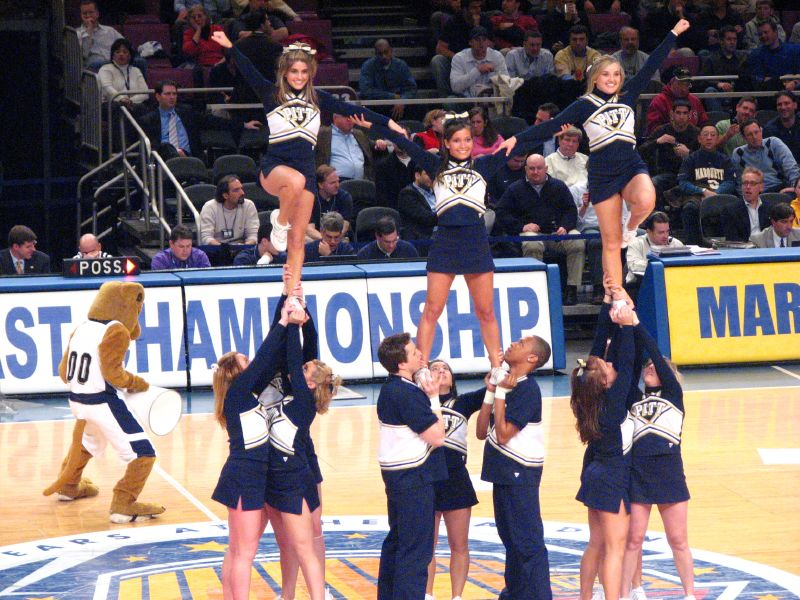
Pitt Cheerleaders

The history rich University of Pittsburgh Varsity Marching Band was founded in 1911 and performs at sports and other events, including at every home football game and select away football games. Its constituent group, the Pitt Pep Band, performs at all home basketball games and at post-season away games. The Pitt Band's drumline, known as The Crew, also performs at football games and occasionally at select basketball games. The Band also oversees the Golden Girls majorette group. The Pitt Band is directed by Dr. Brad Townsend.

==== Pitt cheerleaders and dance team ====
The Pitt cheerleaders have won multiple cheerleading national championships, including three straight from 1992–1994. At the 2007 NCA/NDA Collegiate Cheerleading and Dance National Championships, Pitt's Cheer squad won the 2007 Challenge Cup and finished in eighth place overall in the All-Girl Division I category. The Pitt dance team has also been competitive in national competitions, earning a top-20 finish at the NCA/NDA competition in the Division IA category in 2007, and advancing to finals in 2010 to finish 13th. The Cheerleading team also oversees the costumed Panther mascot named Roc, who finished 6th in the NCA/NDA College Nationals Mascot Competition in 2011. In 2019, the Pitt Cheer team won the national championship in Intermediate Small Co-ed Division 1 and finished sixth in Division 1 team performance dance competition at the NCA/NDA College Cheer and Dance Championships. The cheerleading and dance team is coached by Theresa Nuzzo.

NCA and UCA All-Girl Division I Cheerleading National Championships (3): 1992, 1993, 1994

=== Facilities ===
Petersen Events Center

Pitt athletic teams utilize the following facilities and venues:

- Charles L. Cost Sports Center – Multi-sport (baseball, softball, soccer, track & field) indoor practice facility
- Acrisure Stadium – Football home field
- Fitzgerald Field House – Wrestling, volleyball, indoor track & field, and gymnastics home venue and olympic sports training, locker room and office facilities
- Petersen Events Center – Men's and women's basketball
- Petersen Sports Complex – An on-campus multi-sport complex housing the home competition and practice venues for baseball, soccer, and softball.
  - Ambrose Urbanic Field – Men's and women's soccer
  - Charles L. Cost Field – Baseball
  - Vartabedian Field – Softball
- Schenley Park – Men's and women's cross country home course
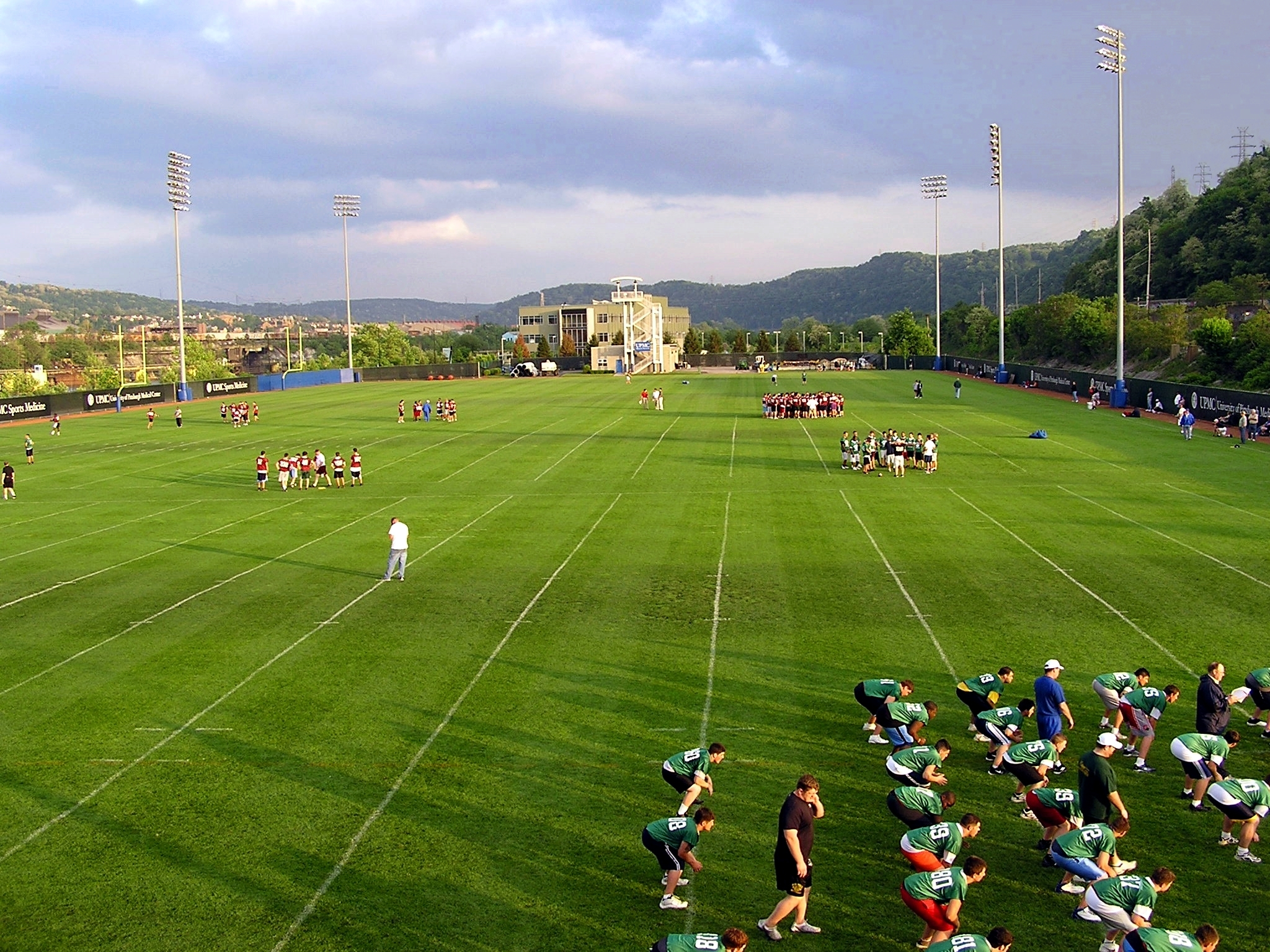
  UPMC Sports Performance Complex
- Trees Fields – practice and intramural fields, and future site of a new track and field and band complex.
- Trees Hall – Swimming and diving home pool (Trees Pool) and the Gymnastics Training Center
- UPMC Sports Performance Complex – Indoor and outdoor football practice facility

=== Panther Club ===
The university Athletic Department has an official booster club, the Panther Club, which is directly active in raising money for the athletic department from alumni, boosters, and fans. It also oversees the Varsity Letter Club, a booster club specifically for former Pitt student athletes. The Panther Club was previously known as Team Pittsburgh, and prior to 1997, was known as the Golden Panthers. Although independent of the Athletic Department, the Pitt Alumni Association often coordinates with the Athletic Department and Panther Club in hosting events corresponding with both home and away athletic events.

== Club sports ==
Numerous Pitt athletic teams compete intercollegiately at the student club level without official sanction or sponsorship from the university's Department of Athletics. Although some are registered as official student organizations with the University of Pittsburgh Student Government Board and thus receive some small funding from that body, they are all largely self-supported.

The following teams compete in intercollegiate non-varsity club sports:

Men's Handball
Men's Ice Hockey
Men's Lacrosse
Men's Roller Hockey
Men's Rugby
Men's Soccer
Men's Ultimate
Men's Volleyball
Men's Water Polo
Men's Wrestling

Women's Gymnastics
Women's Ice Hockey
Women's Lacrosse
Women's Rugby
Women's Soccer
Women's Softball, Fast-Pitch
Women's Ultimate
Women's Volleyball
Women's Water Polo

American Football
Auto Racing
Baseball
Capoeira
Cross Country
Cycling
Disc Golf
Fencing
Equestrian
Field Hockey
Golf
Judo
Hurling
Quidditch
Rowing
Sailing
Ski
Snowboard
Swimming
Tennis
Triathlon
Taekwondo
Western Equestrian

=== Rugby ===
Founded in 1981 and then reestablished in 1990 as a member of the Allegheny Rugby Union, the University of Pittsburgh Rugby Football Club played college rugby in Division 2 thru 2012, winning the Midwest Territory and advancing to the National Final 8 in 2003–04. They were promoted to Division 1-AA in 2013 and joined the newly formed Keystone Conference. In their inaugural season, the Panthers won both the regular season and tournament championships and advanced to the National Sweet 16. The Panthers play their home games at Turner Valley Fields in Norwin PA, Pitt has contributed to the growing popularity of rugby in Western Pennsylvania.

=== Ultimate ===
Founded in 1998, the University of Pittsburgh Ultimate Club plays in USA Ultimate's D-I College Championship Series, the highest level of collegiate competition in the sport. The 2005 season marked the first time the team qualified for the National Championship tournament. Since 2005, Pitt has qualified for the National Championship tournament (top 20 teams) for 15 consecutive seasons which has been highlighted in winning back-to-back National Championships in 2012 and 2013, and playing for another national title in 2018. In addition to winning the 2012 and 2013 National Titles, the team has won 3 College Easterns Championships (2006, 2012, and 2015), 15 consecutive Western Pennsylvania Conference titles (2005–2019), and 7 Ohio Valley Regional Titles (2011–2015, 2017 and 2018). The Callahan Award, which is presented annually to the most valuable collegiate player in the sport, was awarded to Pitt players Trent Dillon in 2016 and Michael Ing in 2020.

=== Women's lacrosse ===
The Pitt women's lacrosse club team that plays in Division 1 of Women's Collegiate Lacrosse Associates (WCLA) as a member of the East division of the Women's Collegiate Lacrosse League (WCLL). The club was founded in 1992 and plays home games in the Pitt Sports Dome. Since its founding, Pitt has won the WCLL six times (2006, 2013, 2014, 2015, 2017, and 2019) and has advanced to the WCLA national championship tournament thirteen times (2003, 2004, 2006, 2007, 2008, 2011, 2013, 2014, 2015, 2016, 2017, 2018, 2019), which was highlighted by winning WCLA Division 1 National Championships in 2014 and 2019 and finishing as the national runner up in 2017. Although the University began sponsoring varsity women's lacrosse at the NCAA Division 1 level in 2022, with three members of the 2019 club national championship team playing for the varsity team, the club program continues to compete in the WCLA Division 1 level.

=== Men's Lacrosse ===
The Pitt men's club lacrosse team competes in the CLC West (formerly the CCLA) in MCLA Division 1.

=== Men's Ice Hockey ===
Pitt men's club ice hockey team competes in Division 1 of the American Collegiate Hockey Association ACHA, and since 2022, has competed in the Eastern States Collegiate Hockey League (ESCHL). A former varsity sport at Pitt, the club program's modern incarnation was founded in 1971, the club ice hockey team moved to ACHA Division 1 in 2006. Pitt Previously competed in the College Hockey Mid-America (CHMA) where it won the conference tournament in 2016 and regular season titles in 2017, 2018, 2020, and 2022. The team has appeared in the ACHA National tournament in 2017, 2018, and 2022. Pitt plays it home games at the Alpha Ice Complex.

== Rivalries ==
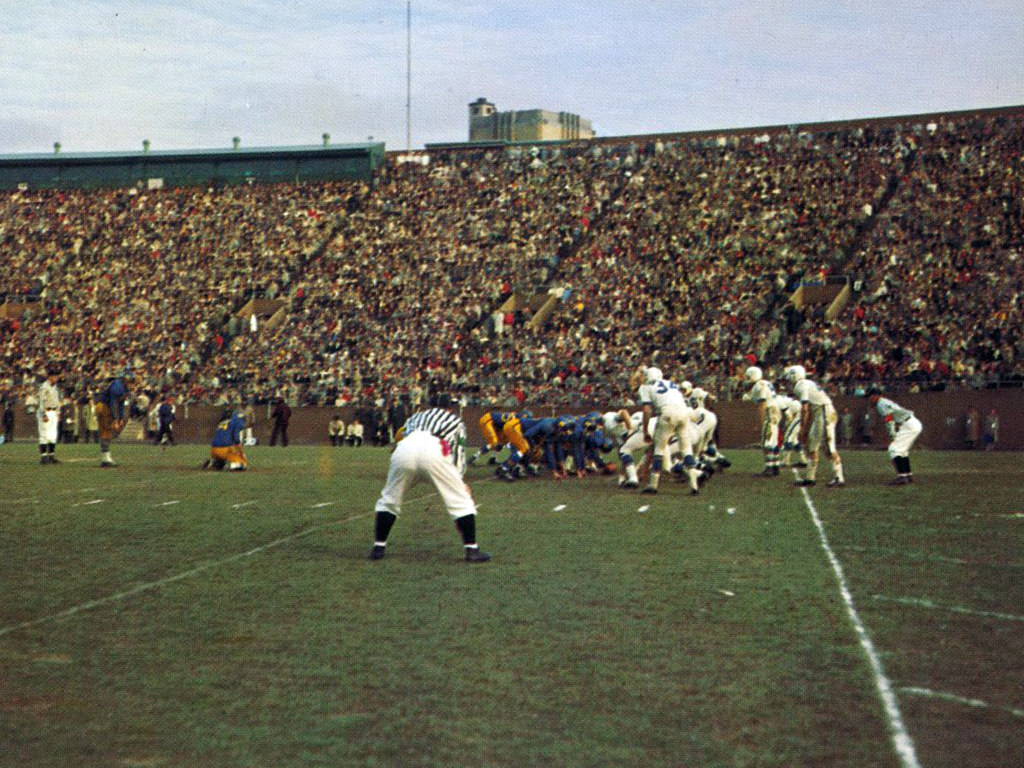
The 1958 Pitt-Penn State football game

Pitt's sports teams have several historic rivalries including:

=== Penn State rivalry ===
For most of Pitt's athletic history until 2000, the university's most-played and fiercest football rival was Penn State University. The series began in 1905 and ended on September 16, 2000 with a 12–0 Pitt Heinz Field victory, but with Penn State leading the series 50–42–4. Although the two teams ended play for years due to long-standing coaching and administrative feuding, the rivalry remained heated among some fans. A revival of the rivalry occurred with a four game series from 2016-2019. Pitt athletic officials have publicly supported an annual renewal of the rivalry; however, Penn State has publicly countered that it is financially restricted from agreeing to a long-term series on a home-and-home basis. On December 10, 2016, Pitt and Penn State resumed competition in men's and women's basketball, with a win in the men's game and loss in the women's game. They compete in other sports as well as in recruiting.

=== West Virginia rivalry ===
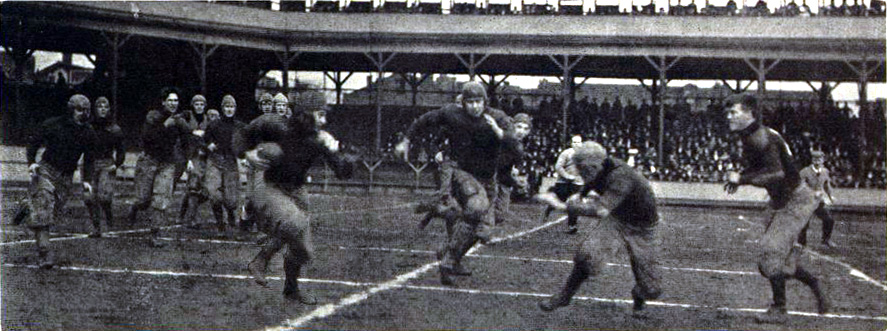
The 1908 edition of the Backyard Brawl at Exposition Park

Pitt's biggest rivalry in recent years has been with West Virginia University, which began with football games that date back to 1895, and spills across multiple sports. The annual contests are called the Backyard Brawl due to the proximity of the two schools' main campuses that are 57 miles apart (as the crow flies), as well as the shared boundary between western Pennsylvania and North-Central West Virginia and the fact that both school reside in the same Designated Market Area. The football rivalry represents the most played opponent for each school, and in recent seasons has been traditionally played on Thanksgiving weekend, with the result often having implications both on the conference and national level. A men's basketball rivalry with WVU shared an intensity similar to that of the football one, and was also shared between the women's basketball teams as well. The rivalry had been relatively unique in college athletics in recent years as the two most high-profile sports, football and men's basketball, have resulted in games between teams have been all been nationally ranked in the same season. However, the football and basketball rivalries between the two schools were on hiatus due to Pitt and West Virginia moving into the ACC and Big 12 conferences, respectively. A four-year home and road football series has been scheduled from 2022–25, with Pitt winning in 2022, 38-31, in front of the largest crowd ever to attend a Pittsburgh sports function (70,622). Since the 2017–18 season, an annual basketball series has resumed. Most other sponsored varsity and club sports fielded by both schools also shared a similar rivalry, and some continue despite the conference realignment for both schools.

=== Duquesne rivalry ===
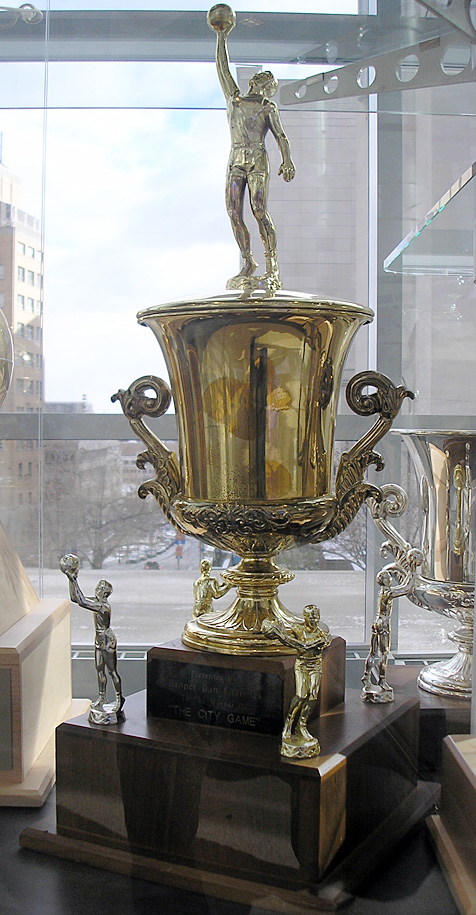
The City Game trophy

Pitt and Duquesne University have had a long-standing rivalry in men's basketball that dates to 1932. Dubbed the City Game, the inter-city rivalry pits the only two Division 1 basketball schools located within Pittsburgh's city limits. With their campuses located only three miles apart, it was the most intense basketball rivalry for both schools through the 1970s. The series was held every year at PPG Paints Arena, Although has been on Hiatus since 2019. Both schools' women's teams also play their annual version of the City Game. Prior to World War II, the schools were also rivals on the football field.

=== Notre Dame rivalry ===
Pitt has a longstanding rivalry with the University of Notre Dame. Pitt has played Notre Dame on a semi-regular basis since 1899, with never more than three years passing between contests since 1943. Notre Dame is tied for Pitt's third most played opponent in football while Pitt is Notre Dame's fifth most played opponent. In other sports, Pitt and Notre Dame both competed against each other regularly as members of the Big East Conference and those competitions continued when both schools moved into the ACC.

=== Syracuse rivalry ===
Pitt has a long-standing rivalry with eastern football foe Syracuse University, which also spills over onto the basketball court. Pitt and Syracuse have played in football without interruption since 1955. Syracuse is tied as being Pitt's third most played football opponent, while Pitt is Syracuse's second most played opponent. The basketball version of the rivalry dates to 1914 and has been played nearly 100 times.

=== Cincinnati rivalry ===
In 2005, Pitt began a football trophy rivalry with the University of Cincinnati Bearcats, dubbed the "River City Rivalry." This annual Big East Conference game stems from both cities being situated along the Ohio River and features a trophy of a riverboat telegraph (a device for signaling the boat's engine room). The River City Rivalry was revived in 2023 after an 11-year hiatus following conference realignment. The teams played a home-and-home series in 2023 and 2024, with Pittsburgh leading the all-time football series 9–5.

=== Other rivalries ===
Pitt also had a significant basketball rivalry with the University of Connecticut. The Pitt and UConn rivalry first sparked with a last second win by then number one ranked Connecticut at Pitt's Fitzgerald Field House in 1998 that was followed by a crowd-displeasing emotional outburst by Connecticut's Khalid El-Amin. The rivalry took on new significance in the 2002 Big East Conference Tournament championship game that saw Pitt lose in double overtime. Pitt went on to avenge its loss the following season by defeating UConn in the 2003 Big East Championship game. Pitt and UConn also met for the championship in 2004 and have since played in many conference games of significance since. In the 2008–2009 season, Pitt earned its first win over the country's top-rated team by beating UConn on the road, and later at home while Connecticut was again ranked #1.

Beginning in the 1980s, Pitt had an intense basketball rivalry with cross-state school Villanova that was touched off by recruiting battles over several high-profile players.

In the first half of the 20th century, a rivalry against Carnegie Tech (now Carnegie Mellon University), as well as a regional rivalry with Washington & Jefferson College ended following the deemphasis of the football and other athletic programs at those institutions post-World War II.

From 1935 to 1941 Pitt football had a notable series with Fordham University which was then coached by Jim Crowley and featured guard Vince Lombardi. The series received attention because, at the time, both schools were national football powers whose first three meetings resulted in scoreless ties (1935, 1936 & 1937).

== Pageantry ==
=== Mascot ===
The University of Pittsburgh officially adopted the Panthers of Pittsburgh as its nickname and mascot in 1909, shortly after changing its name from the Western University of Pennsylvania.

The University of Pittsburgh claims that it was the first college or university to choose the panther as a mascot, which it did on November 16, 1909. According to alumnus George Baird, the reasons given for choosing the Panther were:

1. The panther was the most powerful animal that once roamed western Pennsylvania.
2. Its standing as a noble animal.
3. At the time, no other school used the panther as a symbol.
4. Its colors are similar to Pittsburgh's colors of gold and blue.
5. The "happy accident of alliteration."

Over 20 representations of panthers can be found in and around the university's campus and athletic facilities. Students, alumni, and fans rub the nose of one Panther statue in particular, the Millennium Panther located outside the William Pitt Union, in order to bring good luck to the university's teams prior to athletic contests. This tradition was featured in a national television advertisement for the 2012 Hyundai Tucson automobile. In addition, a costumed mascot, named "Roc", performs with the Pitt Cheerleaders at various athletic and non-athletic university events.

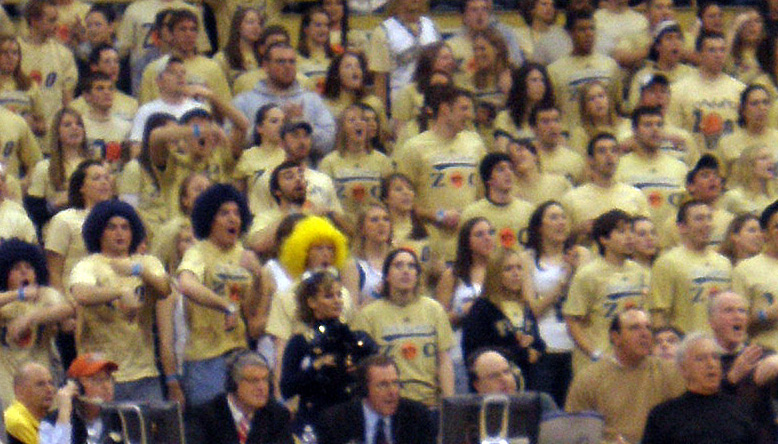
The Oakland Zoo

=== Student sections ===
The student section for basketball, the "Oakland Zoo", has received national acclaim for the atmosphere it helps to create in the Petersen Events Center. The student section for football is termed the Panther Pitt and has been recognized as being among the best in college football.

=== Song ===
The Pitt Band and its constituent Pitt Pep Band are often heard to play Pitt's fight songs, "Hail to Pitt", The Panther, and the "Pitt Victory Song" are typically played during athletic contests, along with other music. The University of Pittsburgh Alma Mater is typically played prior to or following athletic contests. In addition, a recent popular tradition involves the crowd singing a "Let's Go Pitt!" version of "Sweet Caroline" at various points during football games or other university events.

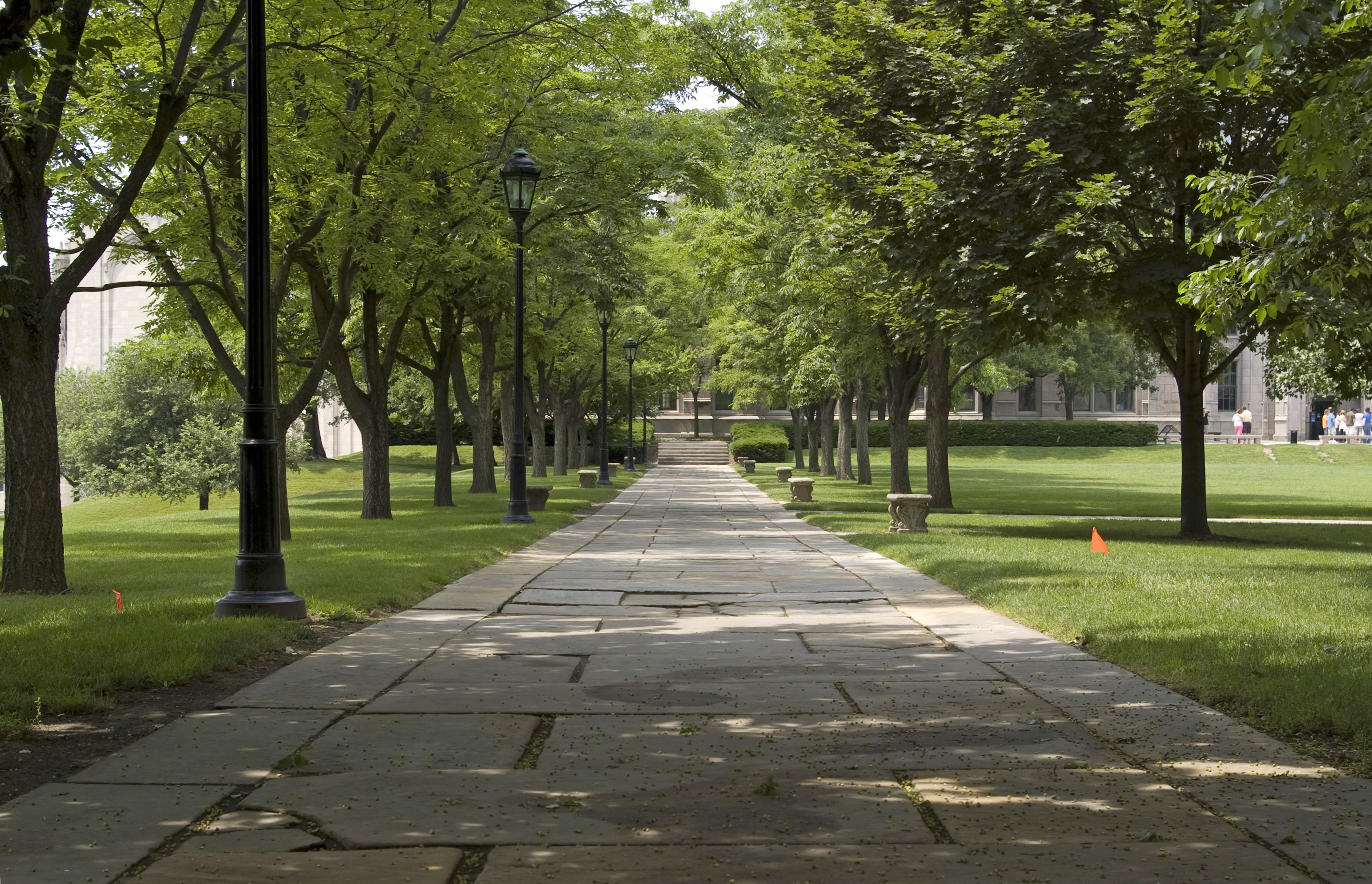
The Varsity Walk

=== Varsity Walk ===
Varsity Walk is a walkway between the Cathedral of Learning and Heinz Memorial Chapel on which is carved the names of former Pitt athletes (each year since 1950) who have promoted the university through their athletic (Panther Award) or academic (Blue-Gold Award) achievements.

=== Victory Lights ===
In a tradition that began in 1983, the upper section of the Cathedral of Learning is illuminated "gold" after every football team victory, as well as important victories in other sports.

== Notable Panthers ==
Alumni, students, faculty, athletes and non-athletes alike, often refer to themselves as "Panthers". There have been many notable individuals who have been associated with the University of Pittsburgh throughout its history ranging from athletes like Mike Ditka and Larry Fitzgerald, to celebrities like Gene Kelly and Fred Rogers, writers like Michael Chabon, businessmen like Andrew Mellon, and scientists like Jonas Salk. Civil Rights icon and former lineman Bobby Grier is being featured in a future film. For more examples, see the List of University of Pittsburgh people.

== Media ==
=== Pitt Panthers Television ===
Starting with the 2010–11 school year Comcast and Xfinity in Western Pennsylvania will receive an all-Pitt-Panthers network featuring all sports and commentary hosted by Pitt in second-tier cable packages. The channel, located on the Comcast Network Channel 188 or 210, will also feature rebroadcasts of games carried by CBS, ABC or ESPN/ESPN2/ESPNU shot by its own production crew and with the Pitt Radio announcers on play-by-play. The university promises at least 500 hours a year of sports games and matches.

=== Pittsburgh Panthers Radio Network ===
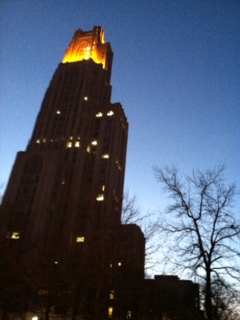
Victory Lights

The following radio stations are part of the Pittsburgh Panthers Radio Network.

Internet & Satellite
CBS College Sports Panthers All-Access
Sirius Satellite Radio
Terrestrial
Location	Station	Programming
Altoona	WFBG 1290 AM	Football, Men's Basketball
Ambridge	WMBA 1460 AM	Football, Men's Basketball
Beaver Falls	WBVP 1230 AM	Football, Men's Basketball
Bedford	WBFD 1310 AM	Football
Butler	WISR 680 AM	Men's Basketball
Butler	WBUT 1050 AM	Football
Connellsville	WLSW 103.9 FM	Football, Men's Basketball
DuBois	WCED 1420 AM	Football, Men's Basketball
Elizabethtown	WPDC 1600 AM	Football, Men's Basketball
Erie	WRIE 1260 AM	Football, Men's Basketball, Pat Narduzzi Show, Kevin Stallings Show
Harrisburg	WTKT 1460 AM	Football, Men's Basketball, Pat Narduzzi Show, Kevin Stallings Show
Huntingdon	WHUN 1150 AM	Football, Men's Basketball, Pat Narduzzi Show
Johnstown	WCRO 1230 AM	Football, Men's Basketball, Pat Narduzzi Show, Kevin Stallings Show
Johnstown	WOWQ 101.7 FM	Football
Latrobe	WXVE 1570 AM	Football, Men's Basketball
Meyersdale	WQZS 93.3 FM	Football, Men's Basketball, Pat Narduzzi Show, Kevin Stallings Show
Pittsburgh	KDKA 93.7 FM	Football, Men's Basketball, Pat Narduzzi Show, Kevin Stallings Show
Pittsburgh	WJAS 1320 AM	Women's Basketball, Suzie McConnell Show
Uniontown	WMBS 590 AM	Football, Men's Basketball, Pat Narduzzi Show, Kevin Stallings Show
York	WOYK 1350 AM	Football, Men's Basketball
