= UPMC Rooney Sports Complex =

Multi-sport training facility

Coordinates: 40.422177°N 79.957273°W

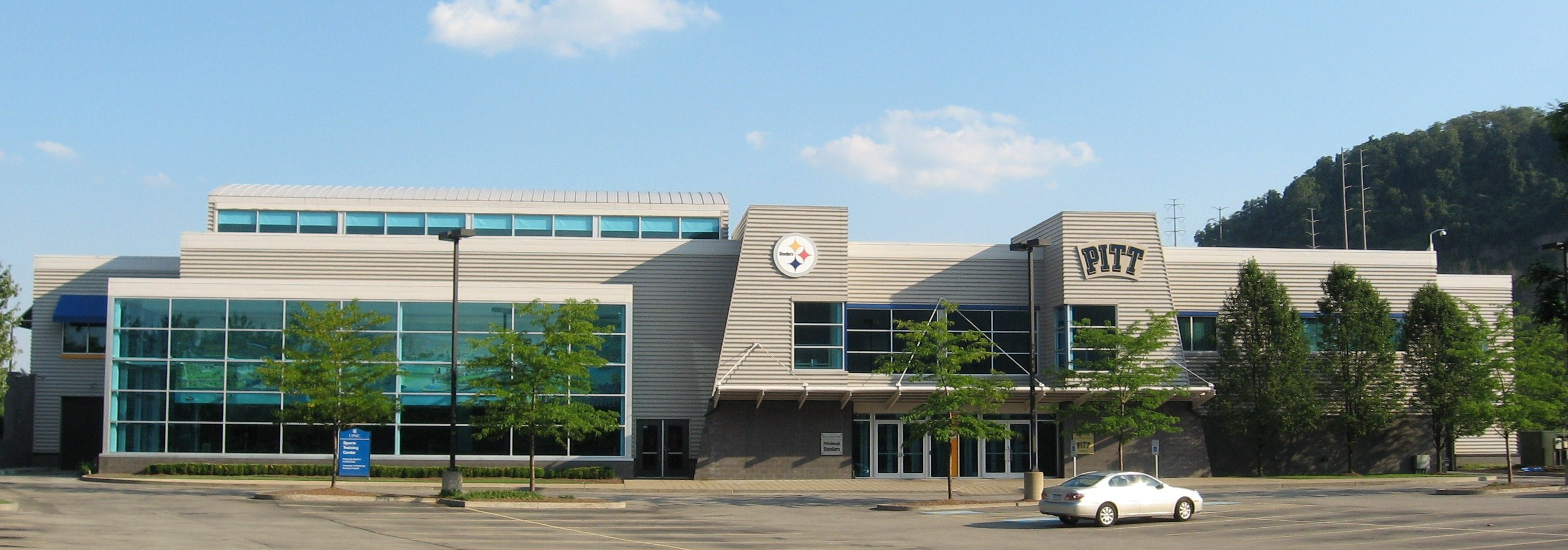
The Pittsburgh Panthers and Steelers team building at the UPMC Rooney Sports Complex

The UPMC Rooney Sports Complex is a multipurpose, multisport training, sports science, and sports medical complex of the University of Pittsburgh Medical Center. The complex is located along the shore of the Monongahela River in Pittsburgh, Pennsylvania, and is unique in that it is the only facility in the United States housing the practice and training facilities for both a collegiate National Collegiate Athletic Association (NCAA) football team and a professional National Football League (NFL) team, the Pittsburgh Panthers and Pittsburgh Steelers respectively. It is also unique in that it combines these training facilities in one location with an academically based sports science and medicine program. The complex consists of four centers which include the Center for Sports Medicine, Sports Training Center, Indoor Training Center, and the Fitness and Conditioning Center located in three buildings along with four outdoor practice fields all situated on 40 acres (16 ha) of land. The UPMC Center for Sports Medicine located in the complex is an international destination for amateur and professional athletes alike for its training, medical, and rehabilitation studies and services.

== Construction ==
The UPMC Sport Performance Complex was designed by the architectural firm L. D. Astorino Associates, Ltd. Development was managed by Oxford Development Company and construction of the complex by Mascaro Construction was initiated in June 1999 and completed on September 5, 2000 although the Panthers and Steelers moved into their respective portions of the facility in August. The complex was completed at a cost reported from $30 to $80 million and, as part of Pittsburgh's urban river-front revitalization effort, is located on the former site of the Jones & Laughlin, and later LTV, steel mill in the SouthSide Works. The MRI room had to be encased in five layers of steel plate, plus a sixth layer of copper, in order to shield the MRI machines from the nearby CSX railroad tracks. Fill was also brought in to raise the level of the land where the practice fields are by nine feet in order to keep them out of the flood plain.

== The Center for Sports Medicine ==
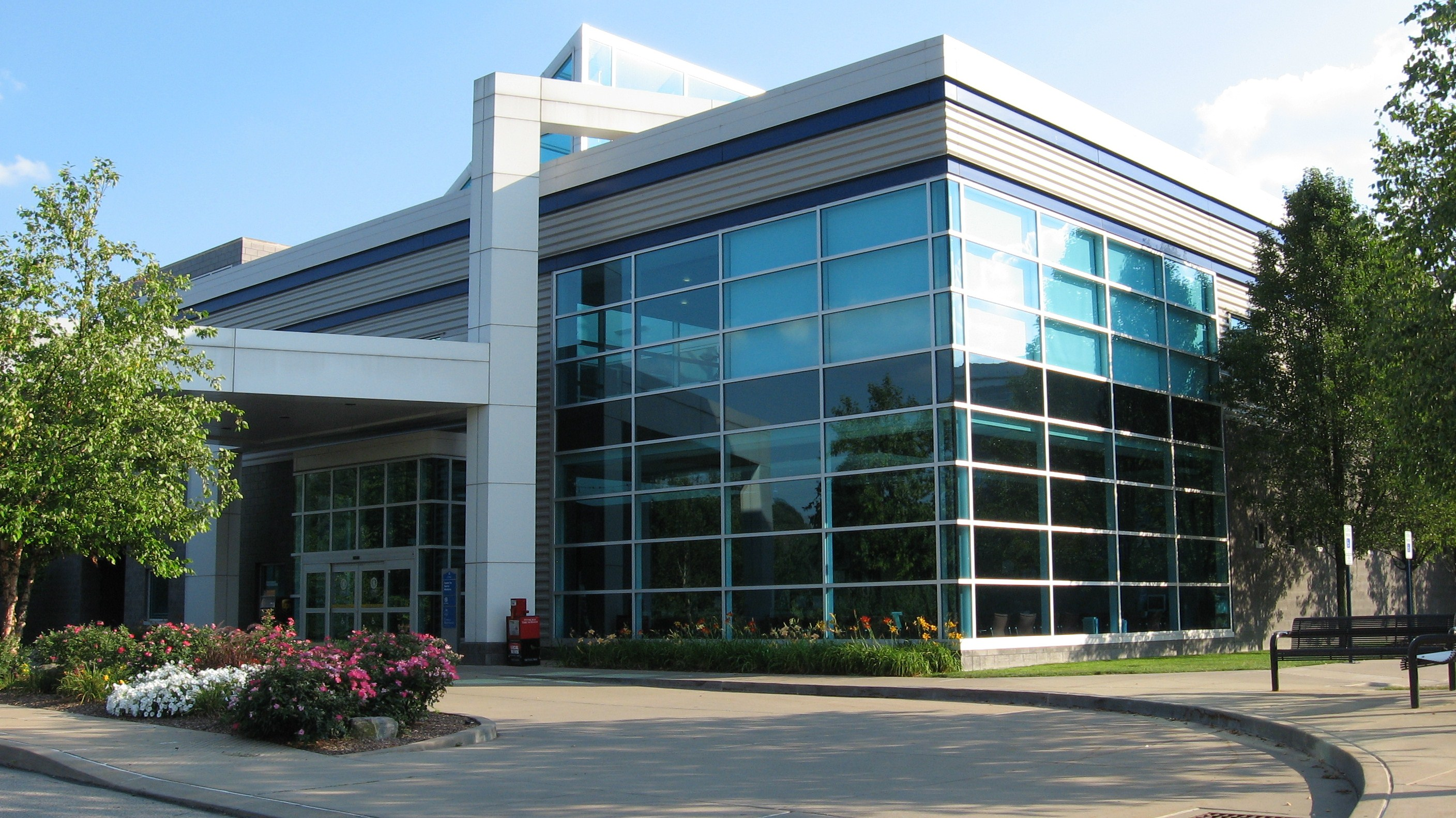
UPMC Center for Sports Medicine at the UPMC Sports Performance Complex

The 40,000-square-foot (3,700 m^{2}) UPMC Center for Sports Medicine, part of UPMC system flagship UPMC Presbyterian Shadyside, is one of the leading sports medicine centers in the United States and is home for the University of Pittsburgh's and UPMC's Sports Medicine program whose medical faculty is ranked 9th among the top orthopaedic programs in the nation by U.S. News & World Report. The center was overseen by renowned orthopedic surgeon Freddie Fu, which has led to it often being referred to as "Freddie's building". In the Center for Sports Medicine building, both the Panthers and Steelers have on-site access to advanced comprehensive sports medicine care provided a team of sports medicine physicians, orthopaedic surgeons, athletic trainers and physical therapists all who specialize in all types of specific sport-related injuries. The full-time sports medicine team also includes sub-specialists in, sport psychology, sports nutrition, sports massage therapy, sports concussion and sports performance enhancement. The center also conducts major injury prevention studies involving, for example, female knee ligament, shoulders, golf and cycling. It also serves as a research center for such areas as robotic surgery, stem cell tissue regeneration, concussion prevention and human motion.

The center's Sports Concussion Program is directed by some of the country's leading researchers in sports concussion management, including Mark Lovell, Ph.D., director of the NFL and NHL's neuro-cognitive testing program. The program's goals involve developing methods of evaluating the short- and long-term effects of concussion so that a better determination can be made as to when it is safe for an athlete to return to active sports following a concussion.

The center has private examination rooms, and on-site digital x-ray units, and an open magnetic resonance imaging unit designed specifically for the types of musculoskeletal conditions and injuries commonly seen at the center. The diagnostic imaging equipment is highlighted by UPMC-developed filmless digital radiology workstations that provide high-precision x-ray and MRI displays in each of the 34 exam rooms that is instantly accessible on-site via computerized web-based images that can be stored as well as clearly transmitted for consultation anywhere in the world.

The center's 6,000-square-foot (560 m^{2}) physical therapy and rehabilitation area is fully equipped for physical therapists and athletic trainers to direct specific types of injury rehabilitation. The physical therapy and rehab area also has a 25-by-30-foot (7.6 by 9.1 m) therapeutic pool and a functional gym providing athletes with functional assessment of their rehabilitation progress with their therapist on site. The training and rehabilitation gym is equipped with extensive circuit machines, free weights, and isokinetic and aerobic equipment, a plyometric training floor to help recovering athletes regain power and restore quick movement capabilities, and specialized equipment and training area to simulate an athlete's performance requirements.

In addition to sports injury management, the center also provides a comprehensive Sports Performance Program that is individualized to each athlete, concentrating on achieving optimal athletic performance while preventing injury. The program usually begins with advanced neuro-musculoskeletal assessment in the center's Neuromuscular Research Laboratory. Specific components of the program may include strengthening and conditioning, improving speed, agility and joint stability, identifying and managing any potential areas of weakness, injury prevention, sports massage therapy and nutrition counseling as well as sport-specific skills training. The Sports Performance Program serves a daily clientele with individualized goals for personal fitness and athletic performance ranging from world-famous elite and professional athletes to nationally known college athletes to local high school and recreational athletes. The center also provides all of its services to many non-athletes with other types of musculoskeletal injuries related to physical activity.

Hundreds of elite athletes and famous individuals have been served at the UPMC Sport Performance Complex including, to name a few, golfer Greg Norman, Tour de France winners Miguel Indurain and Greg LeMond, wrestler Kurt Angle, hockey star Mario Lemieux, hurdler Roger Kingdom, football stars Dan Marino and Jerome Bettis, ballet star Mikhail Baryshnikov, actress Kathleen Turner, along with other athletes from the Panthers, Steelers, Duquesne Dukes, Pittsburgh Pirates, and Pittsburgh Penguins.

== Indoor practice facility ==
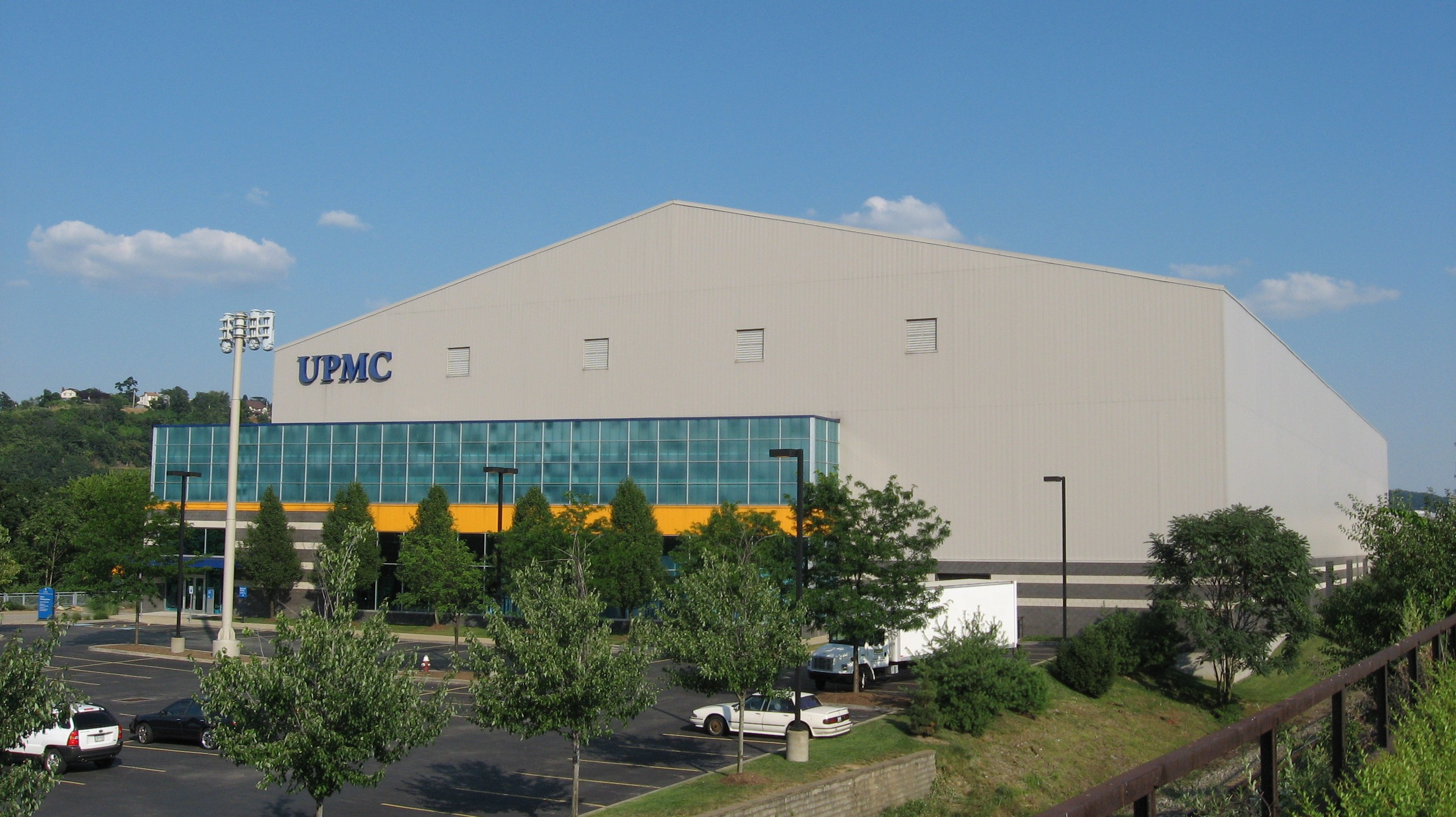
Indoor Practice Facility of the UPMC Sports Performance Complex

The 125,000-square-foot (11,600 m^{2}) indoor practice facility contains a full-size Act Global artificial grass football field, surrounding track, a racquetball court, and a separate strengthening/conditioning area. The indoor practice facility, which reaches 70 feet (21 m) high at its center ridge, is almost entirely taken up by a full-size indoor football field with a goal post at each end and surrounded by a four-lane running track. Located in a separate area of the indoor practice building is a 3,300-square-foot (310 m^{2}) area fully equipped for the strengthening and conditioning components of the Sports Performance Program.

== Panthers/Steelers building ==
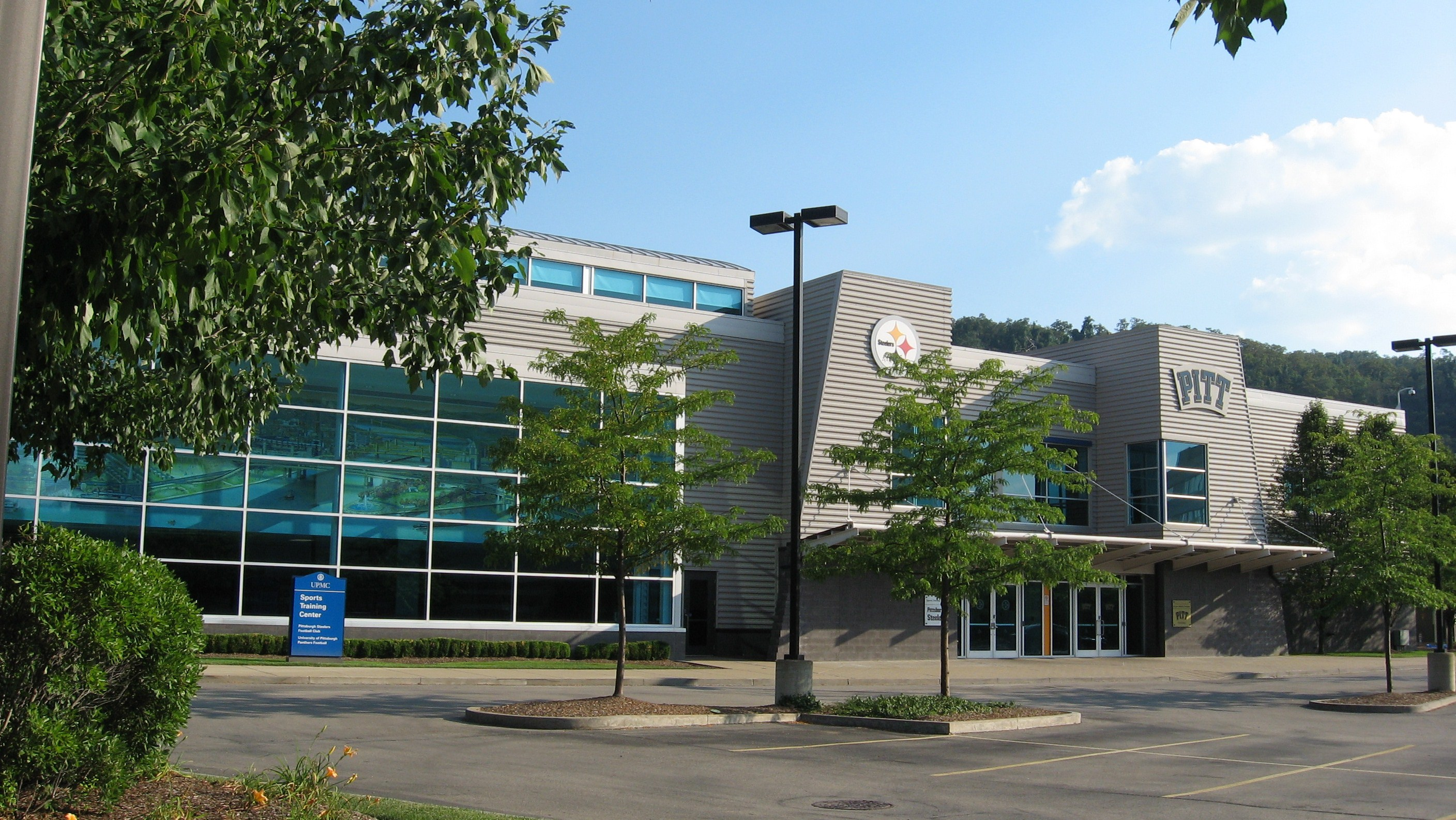
Panthers/Steelers Building at the UPMC Sports Performance Complex

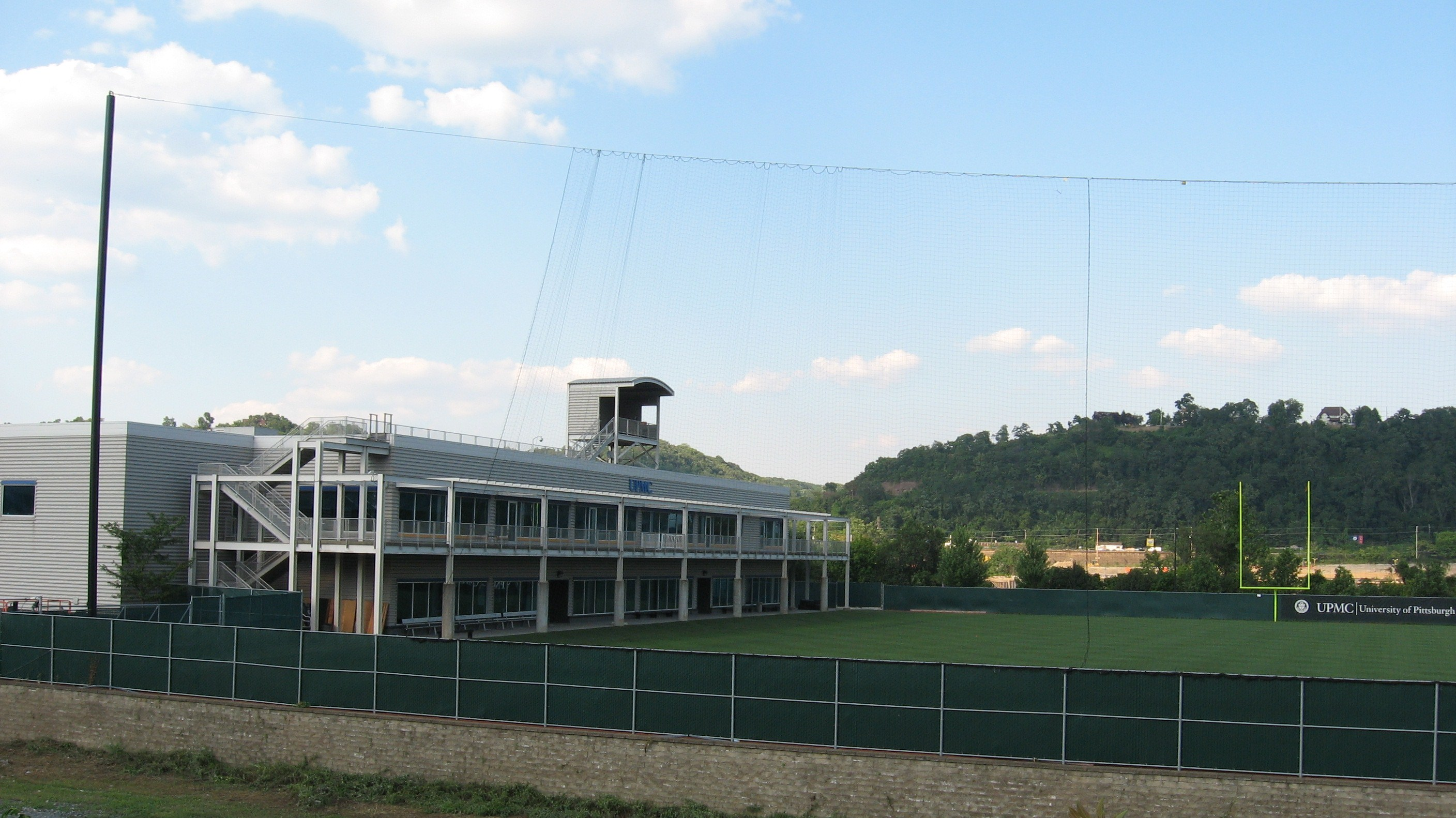
Outdoor practice fields

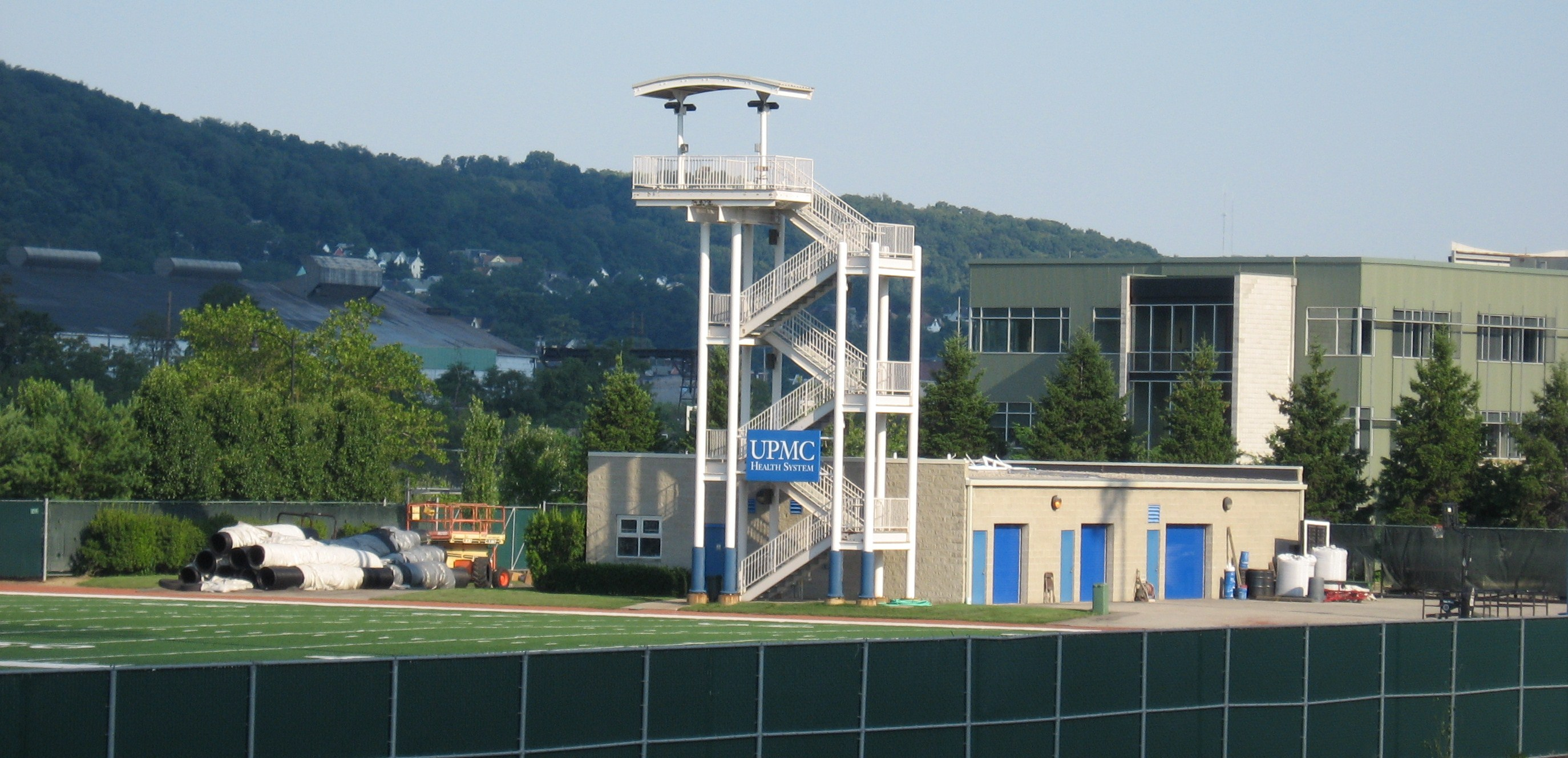
Coaching observation tower at practice fields

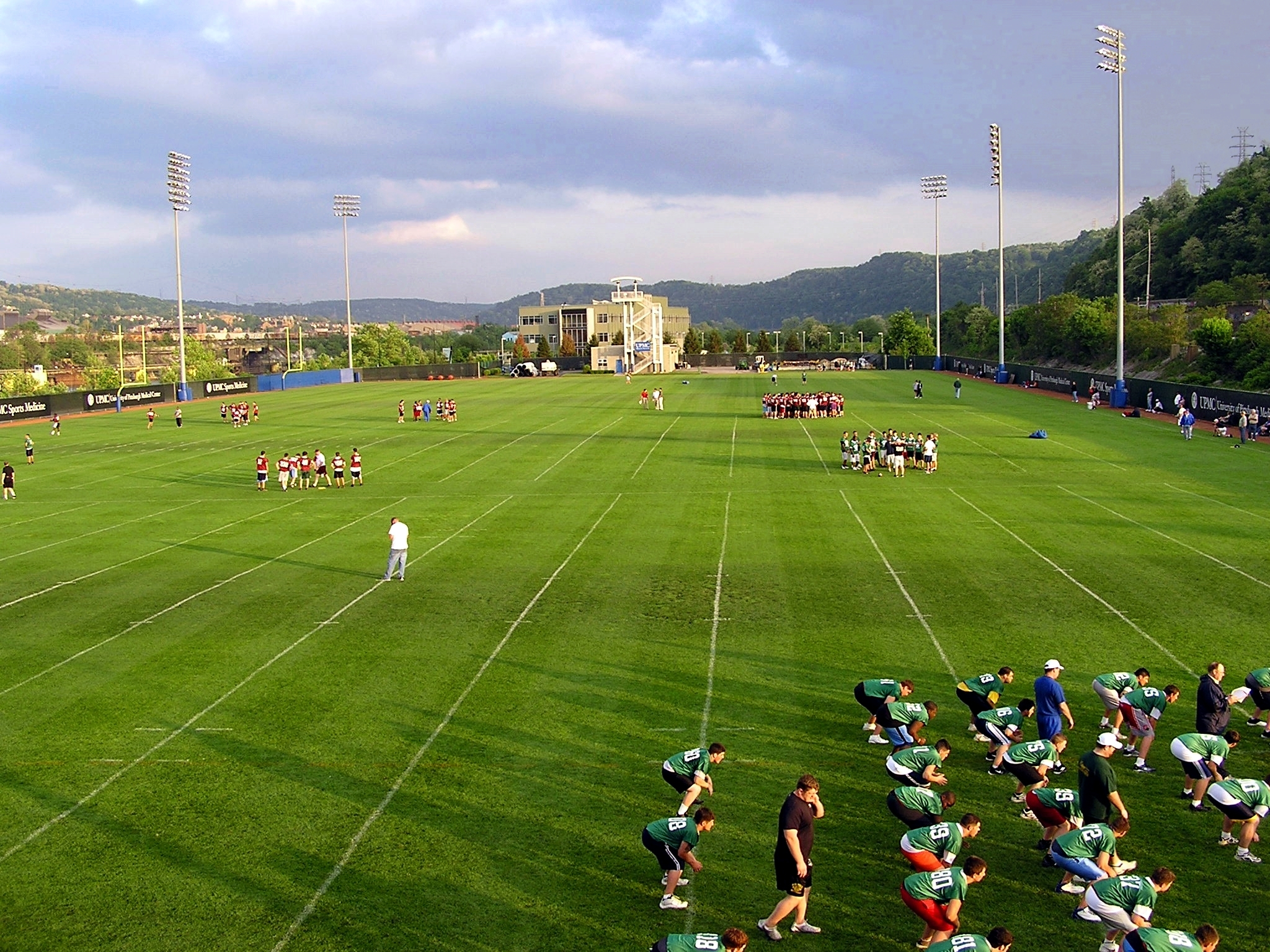
Outdoor practice fields

The 100,000-square-foot (9,300 m^{2}) Panthers/Steelers indoor training, coaching and management building is split evenly in half, with both organizations having two floors. On the building's first floor are the teams’ weight training and athletic training rooms; locker rooms; and a cafeteria-style kitchen and dining room. On the second floor are team meeting and film viewing rooms, coaching and administrative offices; and working media rooms.

In their half of the building, the Panthers have installed a Panther Hall of Fame and a state-of-the-art training facility, which includes the Duratz Athletic Complex, which features expansive training rooms, team meeting and film-viewing rooms, weight rooms and dining facilities. It additionally houses coaching and administrative staff offices as well as the Panthers' academic support personnel. Each Panthers coach has their own meeting room for their positional players complete with state-of-the-art video capabilities. The quarterback meeting area was named the "Dan Marino Room" in honor of the former Panthers quarterback and Hall of Famer and was dedicated in November 2000 when Marino returned to his alma mater for a special ceremony honoring his retirement from the NFL. Pitt's locker room features 128 lockers which are personalized for each Panthers player. Pitt's facilities also include the Hearst Academic Center for Student-Athletes that features a computer lab and student reference library as well as a full-time academic counselor and graduate assistant that are on hand to help the Panthers players in the classroom. The Panthers' weight room is furnished with the latest in training equipment and is utilized year-round for both offseason and in-season lifting regimens. Termed the "Pitt Iron Works", Pitt's weight room was named by Muscle & Fitness magazine as one of the "top 10 toughest gyms in the United States" and has been lauded for providing one of the nation's most advanced training programs.

The Steelers, along with their training facilities, have installed a library in tribute to the Steelers founder, the late Art Rooney.

Outdoors, there are four side-by-side 80-yard-long football practice fields which are ideally situated for private practices and have viewing towers and lighting for evening sessions. Three of the fields are natural turf and one was outfitted with Sportexe synthetic turf in June 2007.

In addition to being a major corporate sponsor of the teams, UPMC is the teams’ preferred health care and sports medicine provider. Injury evaluation, treatment and rehabilitation as well as UPMC's Sports Performance Program all are available to the athletes on-site year-round.
