= Trees Hall =

Recreational facility in Pennsylvania, United States

Coordinates: 40°26′38″N 79°57′55″W

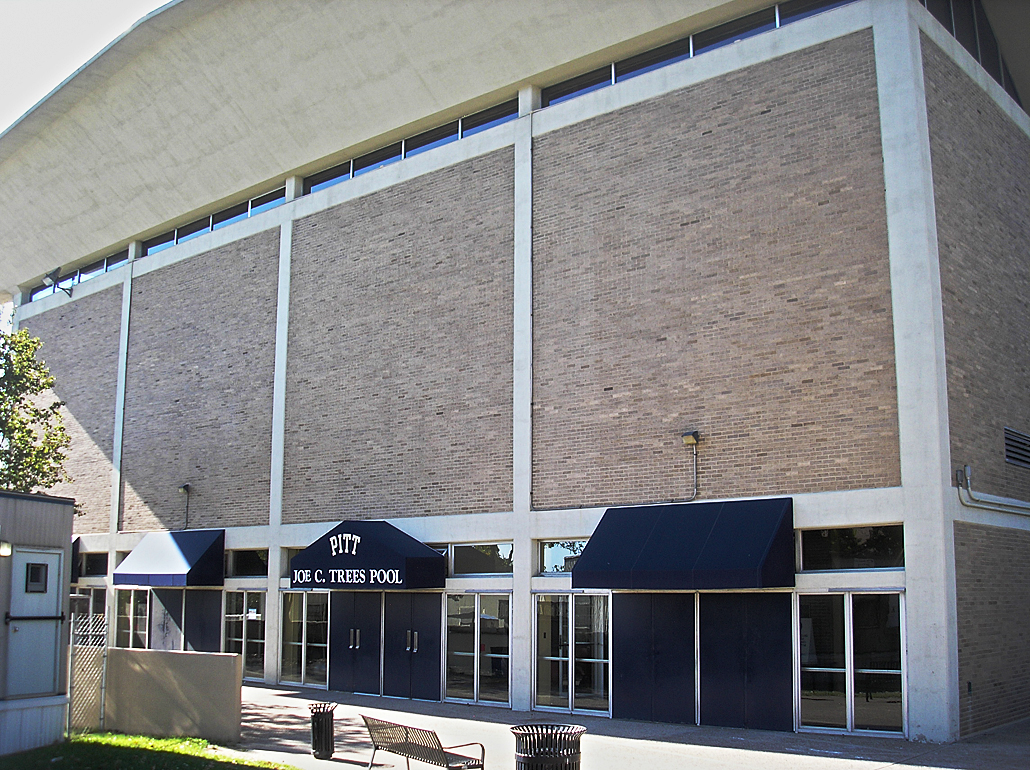
- Entrance to the complex in 2012
- Interactive map of Trees Hall
- Full name: Trees Hall Fitness Center
- Address: Pittsburgh, PA; United States
- Owner: University of Pittsburgh
- Capacity: ~3,000
- Type: Sports center
- Current use: Basketball; Indoor climbing; Golf; Gymnastics; Handball; Racquetball; Swimming; Volleyball

Construction
- Opened: 1962; 64 years ago
- Architects: Deeter & Ritchey

Tenants
- Pittsburgh Panthers teams: swimming

Website
- tour.pitt.edu/trees-hall

Joseph C. Trees Hall or Trees Hall Fitness Center is a multipurpose student, staff, faculty recreational facility on the campus of the University of Pittsburgh in the Oakland section of Pittsburgh, Pennsylvania. First opened in 1962 with a second phase of construction was completed in 1965, Trees Hall houses the School of Education's Department of Health and Physical Activity, various student recreation facilities, a pool that serves as the home to Pitt's varsity men's and women's swimming and diving teams, and the primary training facility for Pitt's varsity women's gymnastics team.

== History and use ==
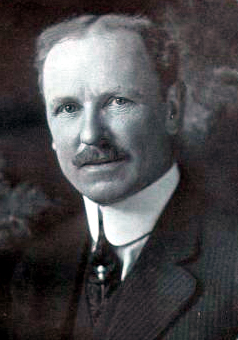
The facility was named after Joseph C. Trees, "a true Pitt man" according to the 1915 The Owl student yearbook.

Trees Hall, designed by the architectural firm of Deeter & Ritchey in the international style, first opened in 1962, with a second phase of construction was completed in 1965. It serves as the home to University of Pittsburgh School of Education's Department of Health and Physical Activity.

Trees facilities include a dance studio, weight room, racquetball and handball courts, three basketball/volleyball courts, a gymnastics area, climbing wall, golf practice area, classrooms, and a computer lab and also serves as the home of the athletic training program at the university.

Trees Hall's pool serves as the home to Pitt's varsity men's and women's swimming and diving teams and the facility also houses the training facility for Pitt's women's gymnastics team. Trees Hall previously served as the primary home to the Pitt women's volleyball team from 1974-1981 until they moved into Fitzgerald Field House starting with the 1982 season.

Trees Hall underwent significant renovations in 1999 when the gymnasium floors were resurfaced to provide a secondary practice facility for many of the Panthers teams, a $5.1 million renovation in 2004 when gymnastics and other training facilities were added, and a $2 million renovation to Trees Pool in 2008.

Trees Hall is named for Pitt alumnus, trustee, benefactor, and prominent athletic supporter Joseph Clifton Trees (M.E. 1895) who donated $100,000 for the construction of the original Trees Gymnasium in 1912 which, now demolished, sat near the site of the present day Veterans Administration Hospital in Oakland. While at Pitt in 1891, Trees became Pitt's first subsidized athlete as a star 210 pound tackle on Pitt's football team.

== Trees Pool ==
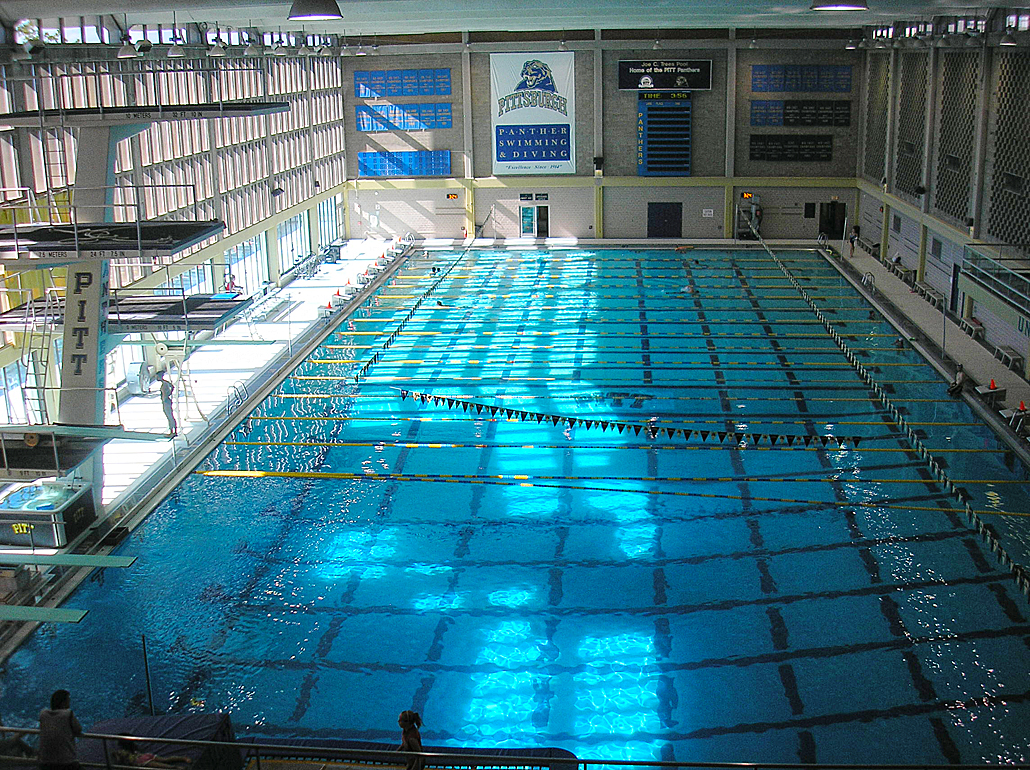
Trees Pool

Joseph C. Trees Pool, housed in the left wing of Trees Hall, is home of the men's and women's Pittsburgh Panthers swimming and diving teams and features a 75-by-165 foot (23-by-50 meter) Olympic-size swimming pool with a 770,000-gallon capacity. This main pool has the dual capability of an eight-lane, 50-meter course or a 20-lane 25-yard (23 m) course. When completed in 1962, it was hailed as the largest indoor pool in the country. Although it was one of the last 55-yard (50 m) pools constructed in the United States, it was also one of the first pools with a 10-meter high-dive tower, underwater windows, underwater sound system, and heated deck and benches. Along with the 10-meter diving platform, it also has 5- and 7-meter platforms.

An additional 6-lane 25-yard (23 m) pool was added in the summer of 1963. In 2002, a Daktronic scoreboard was installed and dedicated the Ben Grady, a former Pitt head swimming coach. In 2003, a Panthers' Wall of Fame was unveiled that featured plaques of every Pitt Swimming and Diving All-American as well as conference and meet championship trophies. Currently, the diving area is equipped with two one-meter and two three-meter durafirm stands with maxiflex boards, in addition to multiple diving towers with a 16-foot (4.9 m) water depth. Trees pool is underwent a $1.92 million major renovation completed in September 2008 which includes a new bottom logo, new 1-meter diving platforms, new pool deck, new deck heating, new water heating, filtration and circulation systems, and a reduction of the pool length from 55m to 50m. Trees Pool is also the home of Team Pittsburgh youth and masters swimming program.

=== Notable Trees Pool Events ===
- 1964 Women's Senior Indoor National Amateur Athletic Union (AAU) Championships
- 1979 Women's College Nationals AIAW Championships
- 17 Big East Conference Swimming and Diving Championships (1983–1996, 1998, 2010, 2012).
- Numerous Eastern College Athletic Conference (ECAC) Championships (including 2004, 2008, and 2011)
- 2003 Long Course Eastern Zone Championships
- 2005 Senior Olympics (swimming, Trees Hall also hosted badminton and volleyball)

== Gymnastics Training Center ==
Completed and official opened on October 23, 2004, the Gymnastics Training Center provides 12,000 square feet (1,100 m^{2}) of gymnastics training space to the University of Pittsburgh women's gymnastics team. The second-largest training facility in the East Atlantic Gymnastics League, the Trees Hall gymnastics training facility has two complete vaulting set-ups (one landing into a resipit and the other into foam blocks), three sets of uneven bars (one over a resipit), a single bar over a foam block/resipit, a trench bar system, five balance beams with mount and dismount areas, low beam space, stack beams and beam dismounts into pits, a full floor exercise including tumbling pits, a rod floor/tumble trac into a resipit, an in-ground trampoline, and other amenities such as cardio equipment, lockers, and a music center. The gymnastics team holds its home meets in Fitzgerald Field House, which sits across Aliquippa Street from Trees Hall and is also connected by a tunnel.

== Gallery ==
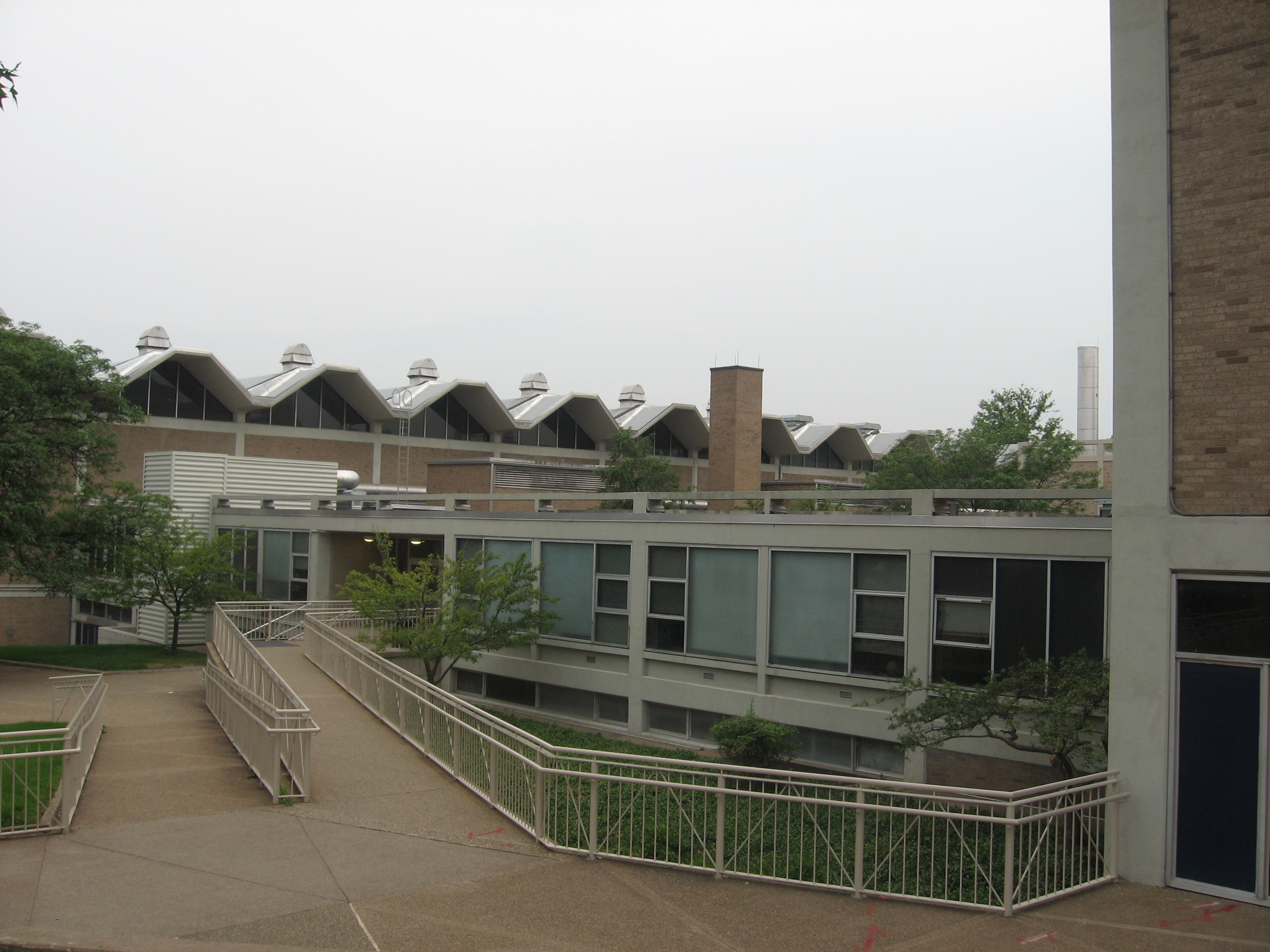
General view

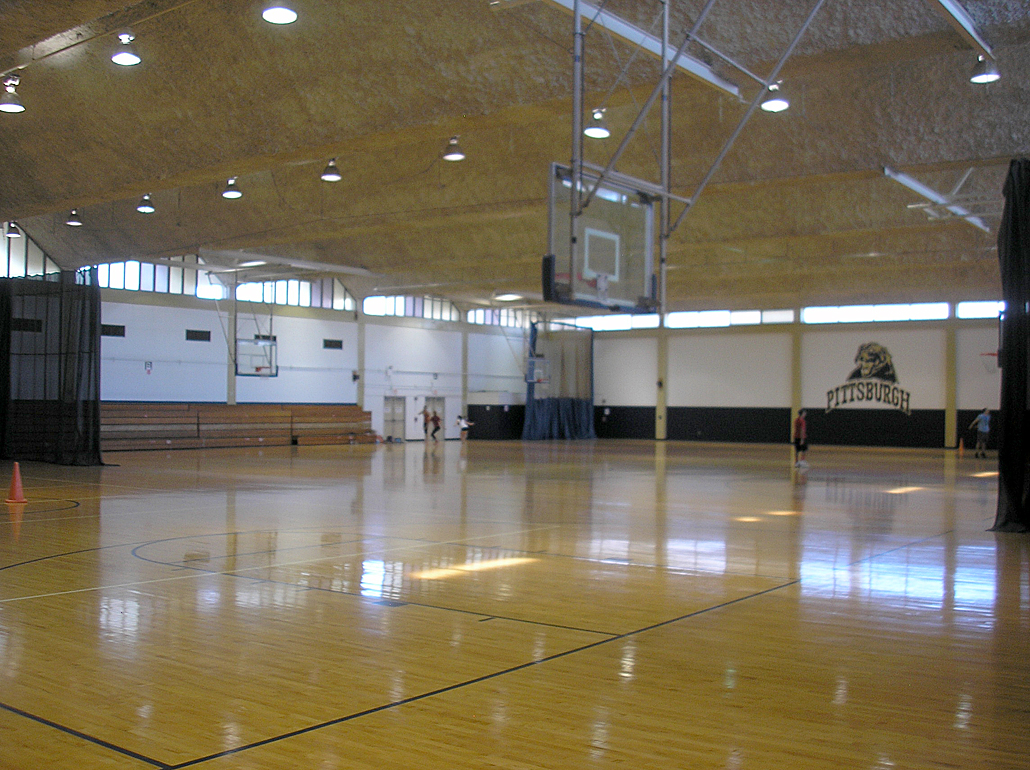
Intramural basketball courts

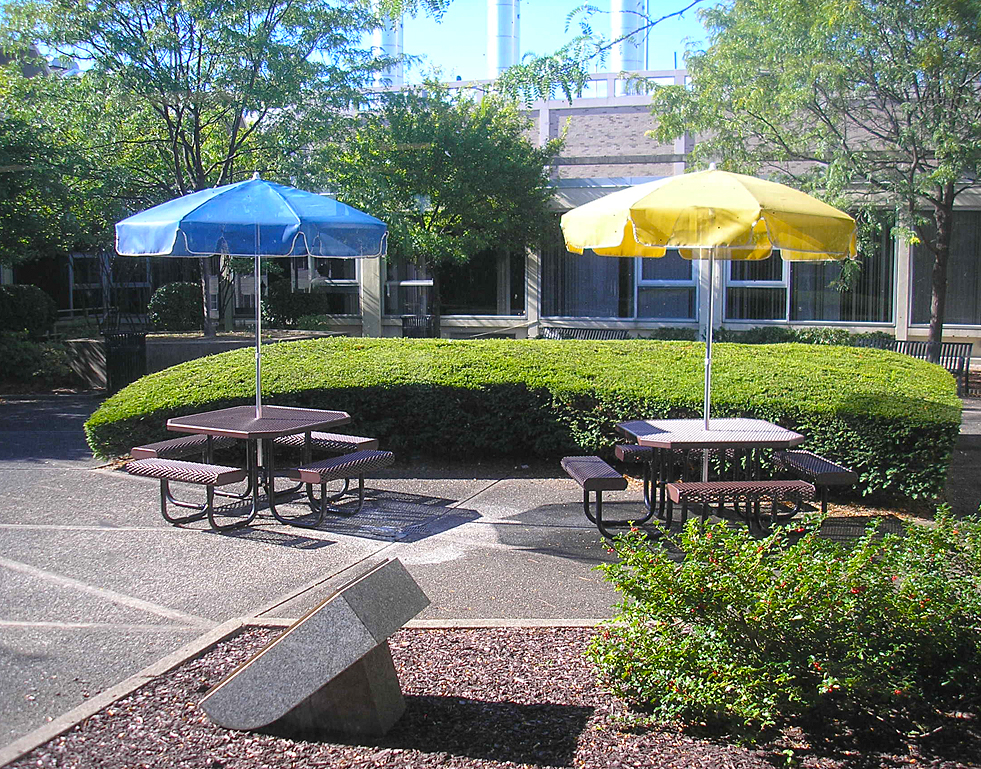
Interior court yard

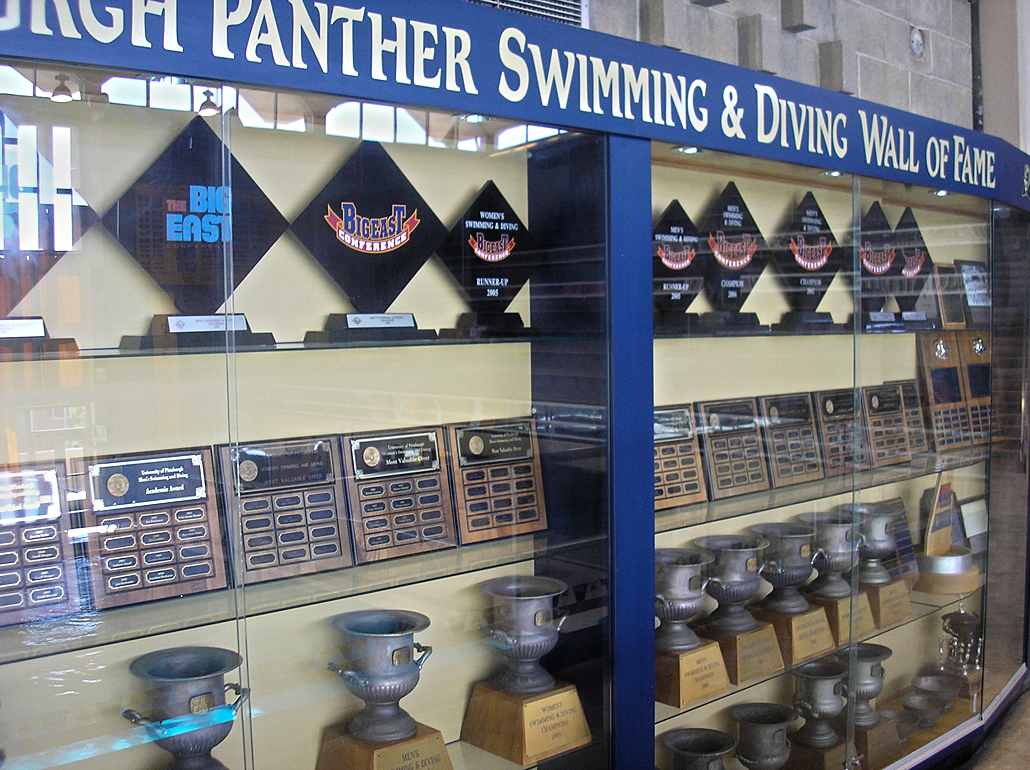
Swimming trophies case

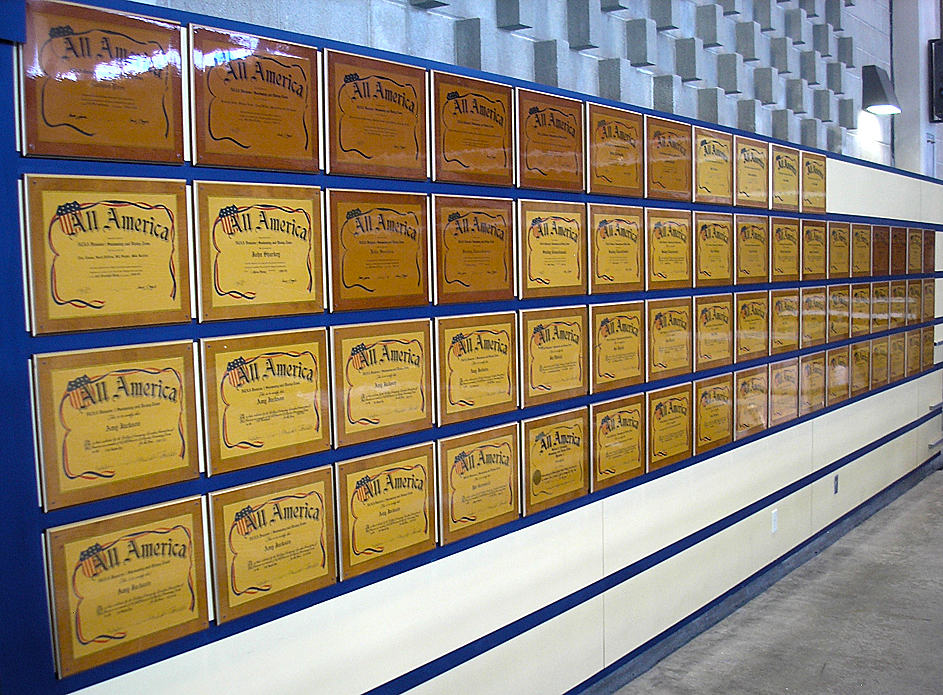
Swimming Hall of Fame

Preceded by Langley Hall	University of Pittsburgh buildings Trees Hall; Constructed: 1958-1962, 1965	Succeeded by Litchfield Towers
