= Pittsburgh Panthers men's volleyball =

American college volleyball team

- University: University of Pittsburgh
- Location: Pittsburgh, Pennsylvania, US
- Nickname: Panthers
- Colors: Blue and gold

Varsity men's volleyball was sponsored at the University of Pittsburgh for five seasons from to 1979 to 1983 before it was dropped as a varsity sport due to athletic department budget cuts. The team was coached by Ray Reilly, and in only its second season of existence, went 8–0 against its division of the Eastern Collegiate Volleyball League (ECVL), winning its division and finishing third in the league championship. In the program's final year, the team, led by All-East players David Baird and Tony Zortea, defeated a top ten team for the first time in program history, finished third in the ECVL, and was ranked 12th in the final NCAA volleyball poll. Competitive intercollegiate men's volleyball at the university now exists as a non-varsity club sport.
