= The Basketball Tournament 2019 =

Single elimination basketball tournament

The Basketball Tournament
- 2019

Tournament information
- Dates: July 19–August 6, 2019
- Tournament format(s): Single elimination
- Host(s): (Ohio) Bexley, OH; (North Carolina) Greensboro, NC; (Kentucky) Lexington, KY; (Tennessee) Memphis, TN; (Virginia) Richmond, VA; (New York (state)) Syracuse, NY; (Utah) West Valley City, UT; (Kansas) Wichita, KS; (Illinois) Chicago, IL
- Participants: 64
- Purse: Regionals: 25% of ticket proceeds, winner-take all Championship: US$2,000,000 winner-take-all

Final positions
- Champions: Carmen's Crew
- Runner-up: Golden Eagles

Tournament statistics
- MVP: William Buford
- Top scorer(s): Dwight Buycks (123 pts)
- Games played: 63

The Basketball Tournament 2019 was the sixth edition of The Basketball Tournament (TBT), a 5-on-5, single elimination basketball tournament broadcast by the ESPN family of networks. The tournament, involving 64 teams, started on July 19 and continued through the championship game on August 6 at Wintrust Arena in Chicago. The winner of the final, Carmen's Crew, received a $2 million prize.

== Format ==
The tournament began with a field of 64 teams, organized into eight regions of 8 teams, all of which were seeded. In a first for TBT, each regional was hosted by a competing team, with the winner of each regional receiving a prize equal to 25% of that region's ticket proceeds. Host teams were announced on January 29, 2019, ahead of the start of the open entry period on March 1. The full bracket was announced on June 11.

=== Dunk contest ===
The Puma Posterize Dunk Contest was held during the quarterfinals, on August 2. The contest "features players attempting to dunk over one another." The contest and $40,000 top prize was won by William Coleman of Bluff City, a team of Memphis Tigers alumni.

== Venues ==
The Basketball Tournament 2019 was staged in nine locations. Red dots mark regional locations and the green dot marks the championship location. The Wichita Regional, held near McConnell Air Force Base, was branded as "The Wichita Regional Presented by Air Force Reserve", through sponsorship by the Air Force Reserve.

== Alumni teams ==
Multiple teams in the tournament were comprised mostly or exclusively of alumni of a particular school, program, or a group of closely related schools. These teams are listed below.

Region	Seed	Team	School/program	Origins of name
Columbus	1	Carmen's Crew	Ohio State Buckeyes	School song "Carmen Ohio"
Columbus	2	Kohl Blooded	Wisconsin Badgers	Kohl Center, the Badgers' home
Columbus	3	Red Scare	Dayton Flyers	Primary school color and student section nickname
Columbus	7	Mid-American Unity	Mid-American Conference schools	
Greensboro	2	Team CP3 (Note: Alumni of the AAU youth program sponsored by NBA star Chris Paul.)	AAU	Chris Paul's nickname
Greensboro	3	Power of the Paw	Clemson Tigers	Clemson's athletic logo is a tiger's paw
Lexington	2	Bluegrass Boys	Kentucky Wildcats	State nickname; also, the Wildcats' home of Lexington is a major city in the state's Bluegrass region
Memphis	1	Gael Force	Saint Mary's Gaels	
Memphis	2	Bluff City	Memphis Tigers	City nickname
Memphis	3	Team Arkansas	Arkansas Razorbacks	
Richmond	2	Ram Nation	VCU Rams	
Richmond	3	Green Machine	George Mason Patriots	Primary school color
Richmond	4	Best Virginia	West Virginia Mountaineers	
Richmond	5	Seven City Royalty	Old Dominion Monarchs	"Seven Cities", a nickname sometimes applied to ODU's home of the Hampton Roads area
Richmond	6	The Web	Richmond Spiders	
Richmond	8	Hilltop Dawgs	UMBC Retrievers	School's physical location
Salt Lake	4	Sons of Westwood	UCLA Bruins	Title of one of UCLA's fight songs, derived from the school's location in the Los Angeles neighborhood of Westwood
Salt Lake	7	Utah Stallions	Utah State Aggies	
Syracuse	1	Boeheim's Army	Syracuse Orange	Current Orange head coach Jim Boeheim
Syracuse	5	GaelNation	Iona Gaels	
Syracuse	6	Playing for Jimmy V (Note: A charity team in partnership with the V Foundation, a cancer-related charity founded by team namesake Jim Valvano.)	Rutgers Scarlet Knights	Rutgers player and head coach Jim Valvano (1946–1993)
Syracuse	7	Team Draddy	Manhattan Jaspers	Draddy Gymnasium, the Jaspers' home
Syracuse	8	We Are D3	NCAA Division III programs	Common abbreviation for NCAA Division III
Wichita	1	Golden Eagles	Marquette Golden Eagles	
Wichita	2	AfterShocks	Wichita State Shockers	
Wichita	3	Self Made	Kansas Jayhawks	Current Jayhawks head coach Bill Self
Wichita	4	Team Colorado	Colorado Buffaloes	
Wichita	5	Purple & Black	Kansas State Wildcats	School colors
Wichita	7	Iowa United	Iowa's four Division I schools (Drake, Iowa, Iowa State, Northern Iowa)	

== Schedule ==
Regional games were televised on ESPN or ESPN2, or streamed on ESPN3; the quarterfinals were televised on ESPN, ESPN2, or ESPNU; the semifinals and final were televised on ESPN. Each regional winner received 25% of the ticket sales in their region as a prize.

Regional Schedule
Round	Dates	Region	Venue & Location	Host team	Winning team	Prize
Regional	July 19–21	Columbus	Capital University Performance Arena; Bexley, Ohio	Carmen's Crew		$21,025
Regional	July 19–21	Greensboro	Greensboro Coliseum Fieldhouse; Greensboro, North Carolina	Team CP3	Team Hines	$3,732
Regional	July 19–21	Lexington	Frederick Douglass High School; Lexington, Kentucky	Bluegrass Boys	Loyalty Is Love	$5,343
Regional	July 19–21	Memphis	Elma Roane Fieldhouse; Memphis, Tennessee	Bluff City	Jackson TN Underdawgs	$6,226
Regional	July 25–27	Salt Lake	Maverik Center; West Valley City, Utah	Team Fredette	Eberlein Drive	$3,584
Regional	July 25–28	Wichita	Charles Koch Arena; Wichita, Kansas	AfterShocks	Golden Eagles	$96,439
Regional	July 26–28	Richmond	Siegel Center; Richmond, Virginia	Ram Nation	Overseas Elite	$17,349
Regional	July 26–28	Syracuse	SRC Arena, Onondaga Community College; Syracuse, New York	Boeheim's Army	Team Brotherly Love	$31,871

Final Eight Schedule
Round	Dates	Venue & Location
Quarterfinals	August 1–2	Wintrust Arena; Chicago, Illinois
Semifinals	August 4	Wintrust Arena; Chicago, Illinois
Finals	August 6	Wintrust Arena; Chicago, Illinois

== Bracket ==
All times Eastern.

=== Richmond Regional – Siegel Center, Richmond, VA ===
Round 1 July 26
1	Overseas Elite	104
8	Hilltop Dawgs	76
4	Best Virginia	79
5	Seven City Royalty	63
2	Green Machine	93
7	The Web	94
3	Ram Nation	64
6	Team DRC	73

Round 2 July 27
1	Overseas Elite	80
4	Best Virginia	68
7	The Web	71
6	Team DRC	75

Round 3 July 28
1	Overseas Elite	78
6	Team DRC	70

==== Richmond Regional Final ====
ESPN

July 28, 2019
12 noon EDT

Summary, Stats

#1 Overseas Elite 78, #6 Team DRC 70
Scoring by quarter: 21–13, 20–16, 11–29, 26–12
Pts: Jeremy Pargo, Justin Burrell 16; Rebs: Justin Burrell 10; Asts: Jeremy Pargo 9	Pts: Kenny Brown 18; Rebs: Quincy Ford 11; Asts: Tristan Spurlock 3

Siegel Center
Richmond, Virginia

=== Lexington Regional – Frederick Douglass HS, Lexington, KY ===
Round 1 July 19
1	Loyalty Is Love	107
8	Illinois Hoopville Warriors	98
4	Team KBC	94
5	Peoria All-Stars	82
2	Bluegrass Boys	62
7	D2	77
3	Fort Wayne Champs	96
6	Showtime	59

Round 2 July 20
1	Loyalty Is Love	91
4	Team KBC	80
7	D2	81
3	Fort Wayne Champs	83

Round 3 July 21
1	Loyalty Is Love	88
3	Fort Wayne Champs	71

==== Lexington Regional Final ====
ESPN

July 21, 2019
2:00 pm EDT

Summary, Stats

#1 Loyalty Is Love 88, #3 Fort Wayne Champs 71
Scoring by quarter: 19–20, 18–18, 28–19, 23–14
Pts: Isaiah Austin 23; Rebs: Quincy Miller 12; Asts: Darius Johnson-Odom 5	Pts: 3 players 14; Rebs: Travis Leslie 7 Asts: Trey McKinney-Jones 4

Frederick Douglass HS
Lexington, Kentucky
Referees: Earl Walton, Alfred Smith, Edwing Young

=== Salt Lake Regional – Maverik Center, West Valley City, UT ===
Round 1 July 25
1	Eberlein Drive	83
8	Team Utah	80
4	Sons of Westwood	85
5	L.A. Cheaters	87
2	Team Challenge ALS	72
7	Utah Stallions	66
3	Team Fredette	99
6	CitiTeam Blazers	96

Round 2 July 26
1	Eberlein Drive	86
5	L.A. Cheaters	84
2	Team Challenge ALS	83
3	Team Fredette	80

Round 3 July 27
1	Eberlein Drive	68
2	Team Challenge ALS	67

==== Salt Lake Regional Final ====
ESPN3

July 27, 2019
9:00 pm EDT

Summary, Stats

#1 Eberlein Drive 68, #2 Team Challenge ALS 67
Scoring by quarter: 16–17, 19–18, 18–15, 15–17
Pts: Jerome Randle 18; Rebs: Keith Benson 8 Asts: Donald Sloan 5	Pts: Dee Bost, Marvelle Harris 13; Rebs: Dee Bost 11; Asts: Marvelle Harris 5

Maverik Center
West Valley City, Utah

=== Columbus Regional – Capital University Performance Arena, Bexley, OH ===
Round 1 July 19
1	Carmen's Crew	88
8	Illinois BC	71
4	Big X	83
5	West Virginia Wildcats	76
2	Kohl Blooded	71
7	Mid-American Unity	80
3	Red Scare	108
6	The Region	82

Round 2 July 20
1	Carmen's Crew	89
4	Big X	75
7	Mid-American Unity	78
3	Red Scare	80

Round 3 July 21
1	Carmen's Crew	85
3	Red Scare	71

==== Columbus Regional Final ====
ESPN

July 21, 2019
12 noon EDT

Summary, Stats

#1 Carmen's Crew 85, #3 Red Scare 71
Scoring by quarter: 15–19, 27–21, 20–12, 23–19
Pts: William Buford 23; Rebs: Jon Diebler 8 Asts: David Lighty 3	Pts: Darrell Davis 18; Rebs: Devin Oliver 9 Asts: Devin Oliver, Vee Sanford 4

Capital University Performance Arena
Bexley, Ohio
Attendance: 2,912

=== Syracuse Regional – SRC Arena, Onondaga Community College, Syracuse, NY ===
Round 1 July 26
1	Boeheim's Army	68
8	We Are D3	65
4	Team Fancy	93
5	GaelNation	99
2	Armored Athlete	96
7	Team Draddy	69
3	Team Brotherly Love	80
6	Playing for Jimmy V	67

Round 2 July 27
1	Boeheim's Army	84
5	GaelNation	74
2	Armored Athlete	82
3	Team Brotherly Love	90

Round 3 July 28
1	Boeheim's Army	72
3	Team Brotherly Love	84

==== Syracuse Regional Final ====
ESPN

July 28, 2019
2:00 pm EDT

Summary, Stats

#1 Boeheim's Army 72, #3 Team Brotherly Love 84
Scoring by quarter: 20–25, 20–15, 16–24, 16–20
Pts: Hakim Warrick 16; Rebs: Hakim Warrick 10; Asts: Eric Devendorf 3	Pts: Novar Gadson 22; Rebs: Shannon Givens 11; Asts: Novar Gadson 5

SRC Arena, Onondaga Community College
Syracuse, New York
Attendance: 2,600
Referees: Brian O'Connell, Pat Toumey, Pat O'Connell

=== Greensboro Regional – Greensboro Coliseum Fieldhouse, Greensboro, NC ===
Round 1 July 19
1	Team Hines	89
8	Boo Williams	78
4	PrimeTime Players	68
5	Florida TNT	71
2	Team CP3	79
7	Tampa 20/20	76
3	Power of the Paw	82
6	Team 23	78

Round 2 July 20
1	Team Hines	91
5	Florida TNT	82
2	Team CP3	73
3	Power of the Paw	68

Round 3 July 21
1	Team Hines	73
2	Team CP3	68

==== Greensboro Regional Final ====
ESPN3

July 21, 2019
9:00 pm EDT

Summary, Stats

#1 Team Hines 73, #2 Team CP3 68
Scoring by quarter: 17–21, 15–19, 19–11, 22–17
Pts: Mike James 23; Rebs: Isaiah Miles 6 Asts: Nick Calathes, Mike James 5	Pts: Nate Mason 23; Rebs: Kennedy Meeks 8 Asts: Nate Mason 5

Greensboro Coliseum Fieldhouse
Greensboro, North Carolina
Referees: Ted Valentine, Roy Natill, Bill Covington

=== Wichita Regional – Charles Koch Arena, Wichita, KS ===
Round 1 July 25 & 26
1	Golden Eagles	89
8	Fort Hood Wounded Warriors	72
Friday games
4	Team Colorado	96
5	Purple & Black	93
2	AfterShocks	85
7	Iowa United	76
Thursday games
3	Self Made	63
6	Sideline Cancer	87

Round 2 July 27
1	Golden Eagles	83
4	Team Colorado	81
2	AfterShocks	79
6	Sideline Cancer	87

Round 3 July 28
1	Golden Eagles	88
6	Sideline Cancer	80

==== Wichita Regional Final ====
ESPN

July 28, 2019
4:00 pm EDT

Summary, Stats

#1 Golden Eagles 88, #6 Sideline Cancer 80
Scoring by quarter: 26–18, 24–19, 21–16, 17–27
Pts: Dwight Buycks 34; Rebs: Jamil Wilson 8 Asts: 3 players 3	Pts: Raymond Cowels 20; Rebs: Maurice Creek, Remy Abell 6 Asts: Maurice Creek 5

Charles Koch Arena
Wichita, Kansas
Referees: Ray Natili, Kelly Self, Chance Moore

=== Memphis Regional – Elma Roane Fieldhouse, Memphis, TN ===
Round 1 July 19
1	Gael Force	50
8	Jackson TN Underdawgs	59
4	Broad Street Brawlers	82
5	Southern Gentlemen	92
2	Bluff City	92
7	Team 901	80
3	Team Arkansas	60
6	Louisiana United	76

Round 2 July 20
8	Jackson TN Underdawgs	103
5	Southern Gentlemen	78
2	Bluff City	78
6	Louisiana United	80

Round 3 July 21
8	Jackson TN Underdawgs	102
6	Louisiana United	83

==== Memphis Regional Final ====
ESPN3

July 21, 2019
3:00 pm EDT

Summary, Stats

#8 Jackson TN Underdawgs 102, #6 Louisiana United 83
Scoring by quarter: 24–22, 32–17, 22–31, 24–13
Pts: Jaylen Barford 29; Rebs: Allen Durham 11; Asts: Jaylen Barford 12	Pts: Tyren Johnson 24; Rebs: Marcus Posley 6 Asts: Marcus Posley 5

Elma Roane Fieldhouse
Memphis, Tennessee
Attendance: 452
Referees: Wes Ford, Chris Pacsi, Raymond Tate

=== Championship – Wintrust Arena, Chicago, IL ===
Quarterfinals; August 1 & 2 Chicago
UT 1	Eberlein Drive	71
OH 1	Carmen's Crew	79
^ Thursday / Friday v
VA 1	Overseas Elite	86
KY 1	Loyalty Is Love	73
KS 1	Golden Eagles	79
TN 8	Jackson TN Underdawgs	62
^ Thursday / Friday v
NY 3	Team Brotherly Love	75
NC 1	Team Hines	88

Semifinals; August 4 Chicago
OH 1	Carmen's Crew	71
VA 1	Overseas Elite	66
KS 1	Golden Eagles	68
NC 1	Team Hines	62

Final; August 6 Chicago
OH 1	Carmen's Crew	66
KS 1	Golden Eagles	60

==== Semifinals ====
ESPN

August 4, 2019
12:00 p.m. EDT

Summary, Stats

VA 1 Overseas Elite 66, OH 1 Carmen's Crew 71
Scoring by quarter: 16–24, 20–17, 12–13, 18–17
Pts: Jeremy Pargo 17; Rebs: Justin Burrell 12; Asts: J. Burrell, Jonathon Simmons 2	Pts: David Lighty 18; Rebs: Jeff Gibbs 6 Asts: Jeff Gibbs 5

Wintrust Arena
Chicago, Illinois
Referees: Jeff Anderson, Earl Walton, Ray Natili

ESPN

August 4, 2019
2:00 p.m. EDT

Summary, Stats

KS 1 Golden Eagles 68, NC 1 Team Hines 62
Scoring by quarter: 24–24, 15–17, 16–14, 13–7
Pts: Elgin Cook 21; Rebs: Jamil Wilson 13; Asts: 3 players 3	Pts: Kyle Hines 12; Rebs: Kyle Hines 6 Asts: Mike James 5

Wintrust Arena
Chicago, Illinois
Referees: Ted Valentine, Lamar Simpson, Wes Ford

==== Championship ====
ESPN

August 6, 2019
9:00 p.m. EDT

Summary, Stats

OH 1 Carmen's Crew 66, KS 1 Golden Eagles 60
Scoring by quarter: 16–8, 13–23, 19–17, 18-12
Pts: David Lighty 17; Rebs: David Lighty 7 Asts: David Lighty, Aaron Craft 4	Pts: Elgin Cook 17; Rebs: Dwight Buycks 5 Asts: Travis Diener 5

Wintrust Arena
Chicago, Illinois
Referees: Keith Kimble, Brian O'Connell, Clarence Armstrong

Game statistics

Starters:			Pts	Reb	Ast
G	4	Aaron Craft	7	5	4
F	11	Jeff Gibbs	11	5	1
G/F	23	David Lighty	17	7	4
F	24	Evan Ravenel	2	3	1
G	44	William Buford	14	2	3
Reserves:					
G	2	Courtney Pigram	0	1	0
G	12	Demetri McCamey	0	1	2
G/F	21	LaQuinton Ross	4	1	0
G	33	Jon Diebler	11	2	0
Head coach:
Jared Sullinger

Carmen's Crew	Golden Eagles

Crew	Statistics	Eagles
17/35 (48%)	2-pt field goals	13/24 (54%)
7/16 (43%)	3-pt field goals	9/25 (36%)
11/14 (78%)	Free throws	7/10 (70%)
7	Offensive rebounds	4
23	Defensive rebounds	21
30	Total rebounds	25
15	Assists	14
12	Turnovers	12
6	Steals	7
1	Blocks	5
14	Fouls	17

Starters:			Pts	Reb	Ast
F	0	Jamil Wilson	11	4	2
G	3	Dwight Buycks	10	5	2
G	4	Maurice Acker	13	3	2
F	5	Elgin Cook	17	4	0
G	12	Derrick Wilson	4	0	1
Reserves:					
F	20	Mo Charlo	0	0	1
G	22	Jerel McNeal	0	3	1
G	30	Andrew Rowsey	0	1	0
G	34	Travis Diener	5	0	5
Head coach:
Wesley Matthews

== Winning roster ==
No.	Pos	Player	College
0	F	Jared Sullinger (Head coach)	Ohio State
1	F	Leon Rodgers	Northern Illinois
2	G	Courtney Pigram	East Tennessee State
4	G	Aaron Craft	Ohio State
11	F	Jeff Gibbs	Otterbein
12	G	Demetri McCamey	Illinois
21	G/F	LaQuinton Ross	Ohio State
22	F	Deshaun Thomas	Ohio State
23	G/F	David Lighty	Ohio State
24	F	Evan Ravenel	Ohio State
33	G	Jon Diebler	Ohio State
34	F	John Williamson	Cincinnati
44	G	William Buford	Ohio State
52	F	Dallas Lauderdale	Ohio State
99	F	Evan Turner (Asst. coach)	Ohio State
	GM	Scoonie Penn	Ohio State

== Awards ==
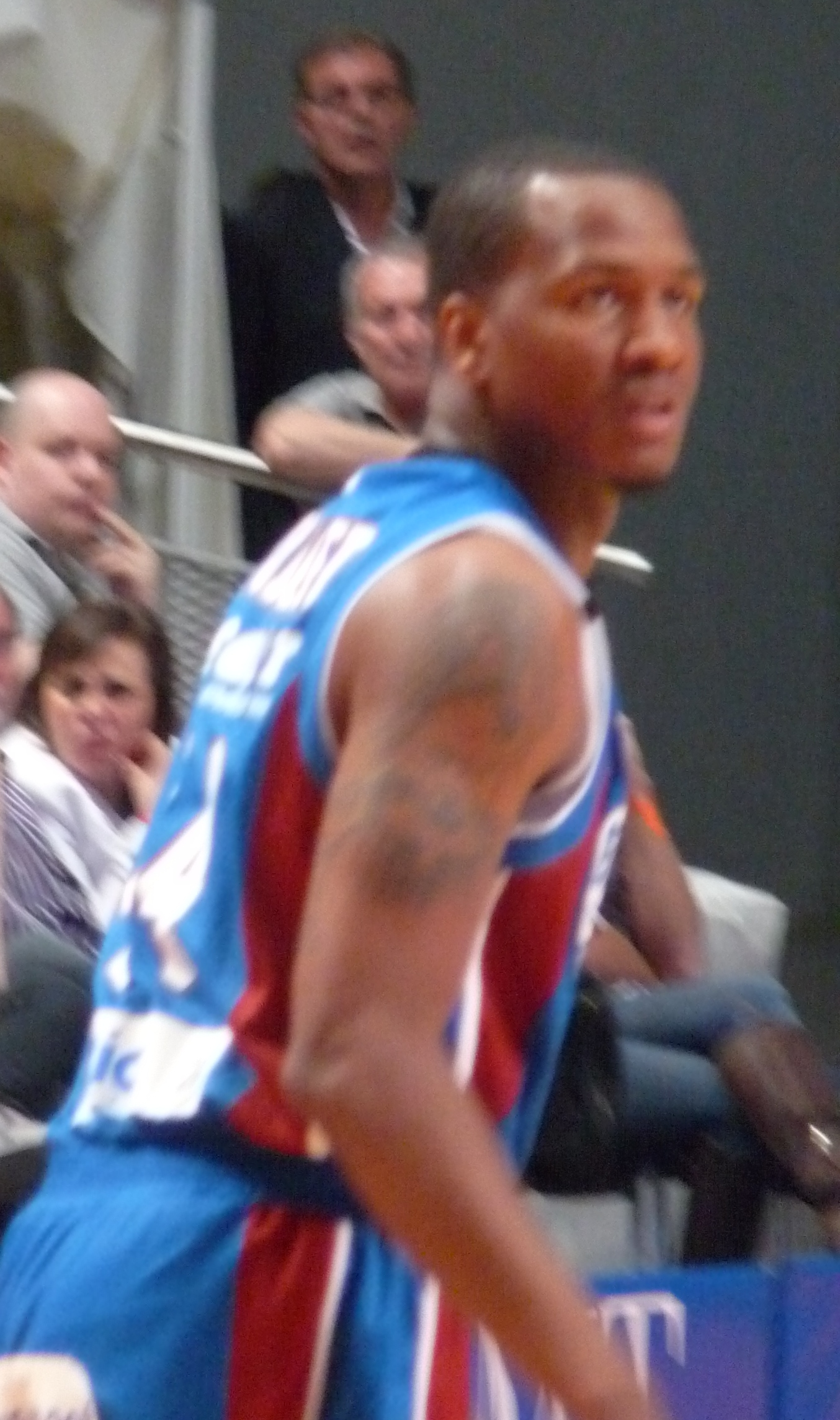
Tournament MVP William Buford in 2013

All Tournament Team
Pos	Player	Team
G	William Buford (MVP)	Carmen's Crew
G	Aaron Craft	Carmen's Crew
F	D. J. Kennedy	Overseas Elite
G	Jaylen Barford	Jackson TN Underdawgs
G	Dwight Buycks	Golden Eagles
GM	Daniel Fitzgerald	Golden Eagles
