= Daniel Fitzgerald =

Daniel Fitzgerald may refer to:

- Daniel Fitzgerald (Neighbours), fictional character on the Australian soap opera, Neighbours
- Dan Fitzgerald (1942–2010), American college basketball coach
- Daniel Fitzgerald (Gaelic footballer), see Brian Cuthbert
- Dan Fitzgerald (baseball), American baseball player
- Daniel Fitzgerald (basketball) (born 1984)
- Daniel Fitzgerald (referee) from 2012 New York Red Bulls season
- Danny Fitzgerald (baseball) from Niagara Stars
- Daniel J. Fitzgerald (1898–1990), American Massachusetts State Deputy of the Knights of Columbus
