= Garrett Byrne =

- Garrett Byrne (Irish politician) (1829–1897), Irish MP in the House of Commons of the United Kingdom of Great Britain and Ireland (1880–83, 1885–92)
- Garrett H. Byrne (1897–1989), District Attorney of Suffolk County, Massachusetts from 1952 to 1979
