= Golden Eagles (basketball) =

Professional basketball team

- Leagues: The Basketball Tournament
- Founded: 2016
- History: Golden Eagles (2016–present)
- Team colors: Blue and gold
- General manager: Dan Fitzgerald
- Head coach: Joe Chapman
- Championships: 1 TBT (2020)
- Website: Team page
Home	Away	Third

The Golden Eagles are an American basketball team that participates in The Basketball Tournament (TBT), an annual winner-take-all single-elimination tournament. The team first played in the tournament in 2016, was the runner-up in 2019, and won the championship (and $1 million prize) in 2020. The Golden Eagles' roster consists of professional basketball players who compete outside of the NBA, most of whom played college basketball for the Marquette Golden Eagles men's basketball team. The TBT team is an independent entity that was named after the college team.

== History ==
=== 2016: First tournament ===
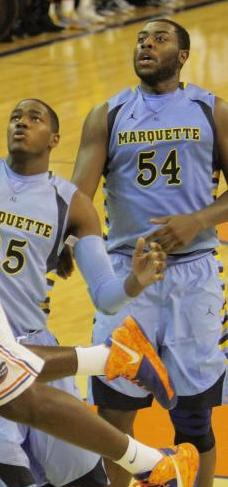
Davante Gardner (No. 54) played on the first two editions of the team.

The "Golden Eagles Alumni" were the No. 6 seed in the Midwest region.

==== Games ====
Date	Round	Location	Score	Opponent		Ref.
Date	Round	Location	Score	Team	Seed	Ref.
July 16	Regional	Chicago, IL	95–92	Hoopville Warriors	Midwest No. 11	
July 17	Regional	Chicago, IL	97–70	Spartan Heroes	Midwest No. 3	
July 22	Super 16	Philadelphia, PA	82–71	Armored Athlete	Midwest No. 7	
July 23	Quarterfinals	Philadelphia, PA	81–89	Always a Brave	Midwest No. 9	

==== Players ====
- Maurice Acker
- Dwight Burke
- Dwight Buycks
- Joe Chapman
- Davante Gardner
- Marcus Jackson
- Darius Johnson-Odom
- Trent Lockett
- Jerel McNeal
- Derrick Wilson
- Jamil Wilson
- Wesley Matthews (coach)
- Travis Diener (asst. coach)

=== 2017: Second tournament ===
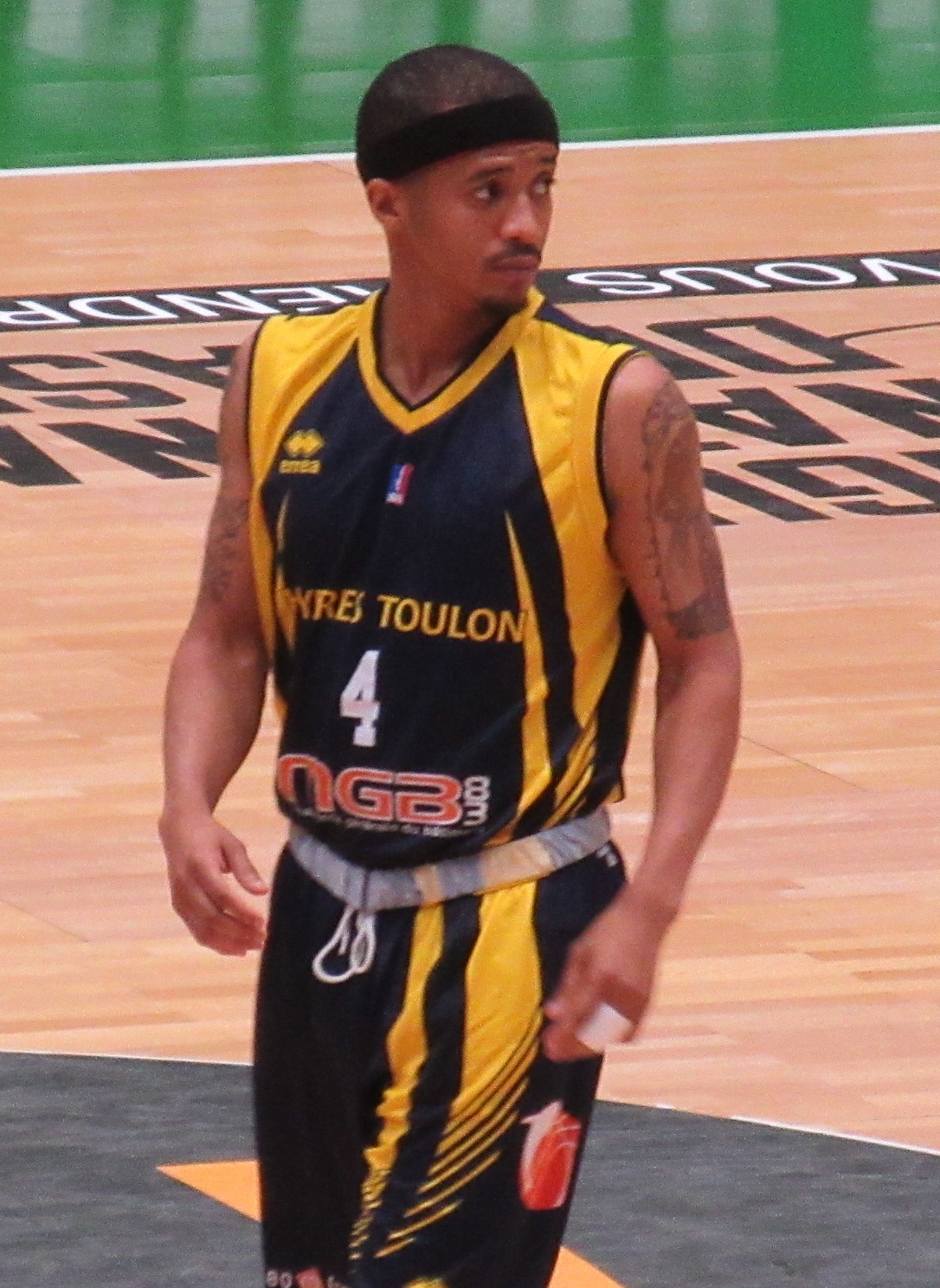
Maurice Acker has played on the team each year.

The Golden Eagles were the No. 1 seed in the Midwest region.

==== Games ====
Date	Round	Location	Score	Opponent		Stats
Date	Round	Location	Score	Team	Seed	Stats
July 8	Regional	Peoria, IL	103–89	Midwest Dream Squad	Midwest No. 16	
July 9	Regional	Peoria, IL	81–70	Majerus SLU Crew	Midwest No. 8	
July 22	Super 16	Brooklyn, NY	84–77	Purple and Black	Midwest No. 4	
July 23	Quarterfinals	Brooklyn, NY	56–81	Scarlet & Gray	Midwest No. 2	

==== Players ====
- Maurice Acker
- Juan Anderson
- Lawrence Blackledge
- Dwight Burke
- Dwight Buycks
- Joe Chapman
- Davante Gardner
- Darius Johnson-Odom
- Trent Lockett
- Jerel McNeal
- Jamil Wilson
- Wesley Matthews (coach)
- Travis Diener (asst. coach)

=== 2018: Final four appearance ===
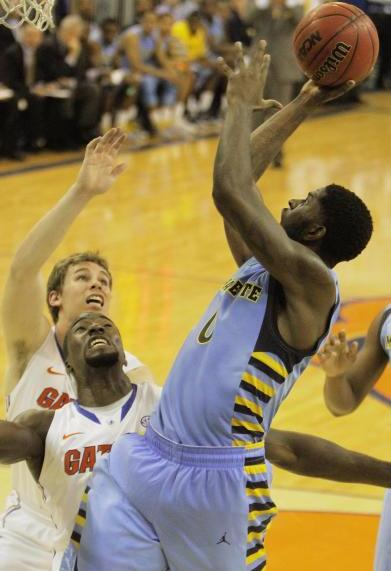
Jamil Wilson received All-Tournament honors in 2018 and 2020.

The Golden Eagles were the No. 3 seed in the Northeast region.

==== Games ====
Date	Round	Location	Score	Opponent		Stats
Date	Round	Location	Score	Team	Seed	Stats
July 21	Regional	Milwaukee, WI	78–67	Johnnies	Northeast No. 14	
July 22	Regional	Brooklyn, NY	96–76	Hall In	Northeast No. 11	
July 28	Super 16	Atlanta, GA	73–66	Talladega Knights	Northeast No. 15	
July 29	Quarterfinals	Atlanta, GA	90–86	Boeheim's Army	Northeast No. 1	
August 2	Semifinals	Baltimore, MD	60–85	Overseas Elite	South No. 1	

==== Players ====
- Maurice Acker
- Willie Atwood
- Lawrence Blackledge
- Cinmeon Bowers
- Elgin Cook
- Travis Diener
- Jerel McNeal
- Brett Prahl
- Jake Thomas
- Derrick Wilson
- Jamil Wilson
- Joe Chapman (coach)

=== 2019: Title game appearance ===
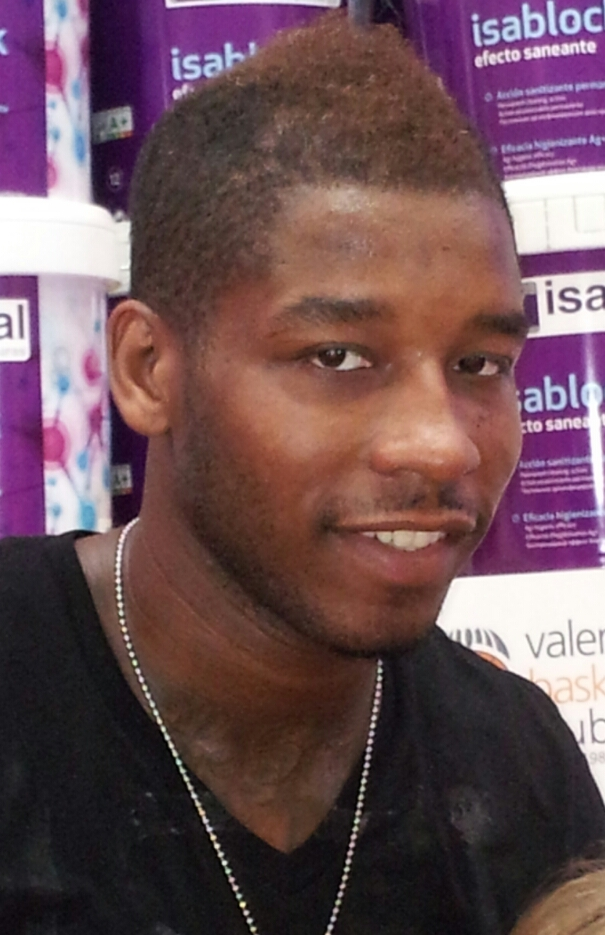
Dwight Buycks was named to the All-Tournament team in 2016 and 2019.

The Golden Eagles were the No. 1 seed in the Wichita regional. By winning their region, the team received 25% of the region's ticket sales as a prize, which was $96,439.

==== Games ====
Date	Round	Location	Score	Opponent		Stats
Date	Round	Location	Score	Team	Seed	Stats
July 26	Regional	Wichita, KS	89–72	Fort Hood Wounded Warriors	Wichita No. 8	
July 27	Regional	Wichita, KS	83–81	Team Colorado	Wichita No. 4	
July 28	Regional	Wichita, KS	88–80	Sideline Cancer	Wichita No. 6	
August 1	Quarterfinals	Chicago, IL	79–62	Jackson TN Underdawgs	Memphis No. 8	
August 4	Semifinals	Chicago, IL	68–62	Team Hines	Greensboro No. 1	
August 6	Final	Chicago, IL	60–66	Carmen's Crew	Columbus No. 1	

==== Players ====
- Maurice Acker
- Juan Anderson
- Lawrence Blackledge
- Cinmeon Bowers
- Dwight Buycks
- Mo Charlo
- Elgin Cook
- Travis Diener
- Jerel McNeal
- Andrew Rowsey
- Jake Thomas
- Jarvis Williams
- Derrick Wilson
- Jamil Wilson
- Joe Chapman (coach)

=== 2020: Championship ===
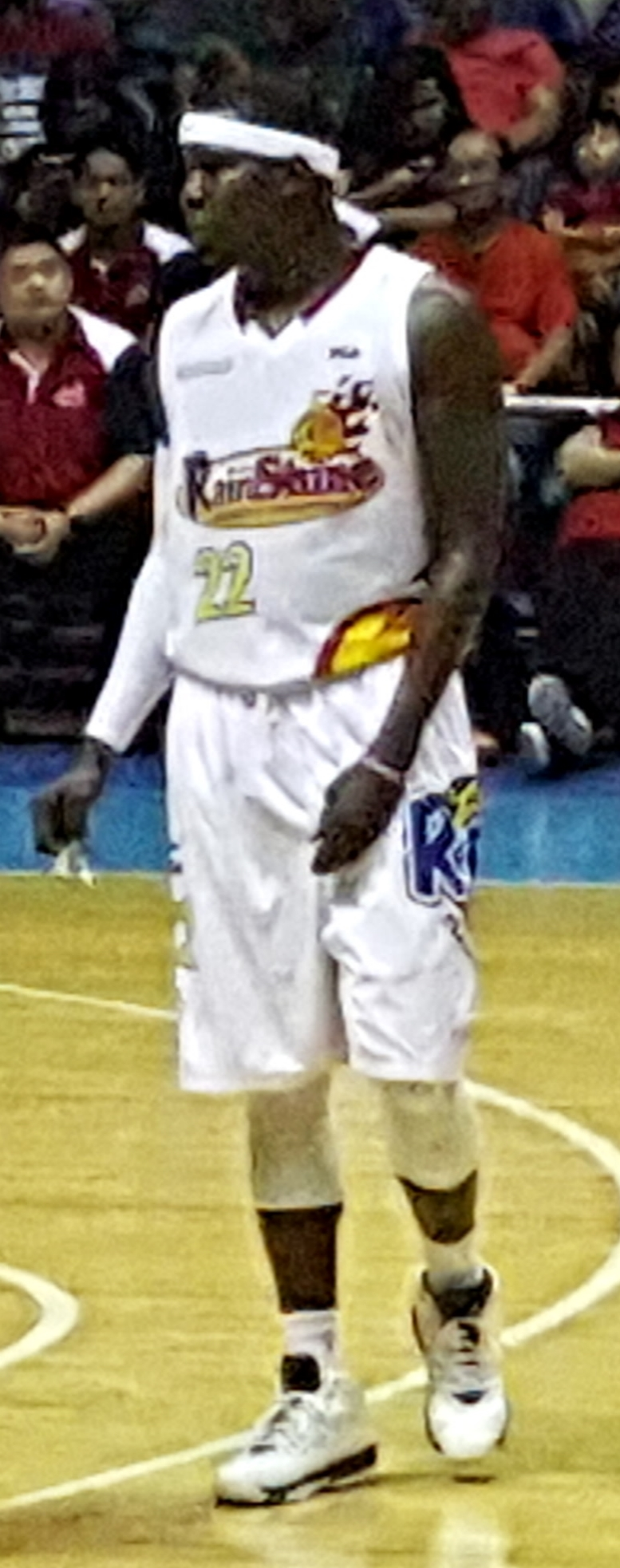
Mo Charlo played on the 2019 and 2020 teams.

The Golden Eagles were the No. 4 overall seed, in a field reduced to 24 teams due to the COVID-19 pandemic.

==== Games ====
The team received a first-round bye.

Date	Round	Location	Score	Opponent		Stats
Date	Round	Location	Score	Team	Seed	Stats
July 6	Super 16	Nationwide Arena, Columbus, Ohio	76–67	Team CP3	13th overall	
July 10	Quarterfinals	Nationwide Arena, Columbus, Ohio	83–76	Brotherly Love	12th overall	
July 12	Semifinals	Nationwide Arena, Columbus, Ohio	79–70	Red Scare	8th overall	
July 14	Final	Nationwide Arena, Columbus, Ohio	78–73	Sideline Cancer	22nd overall	

==== Players ====
- Maurice Acker
- Dwight Buycks
- Mo Charlo
- Elgin Cook
- Travis Diener
- Luke Fischer
- Darius Johnson-Odom
- Andrew Rowsey
- Jarvis Williams
- Derrick Wilson
- Jamil Wilson
- Joe Chapman (coach)

=== 2021: Championship defense ===
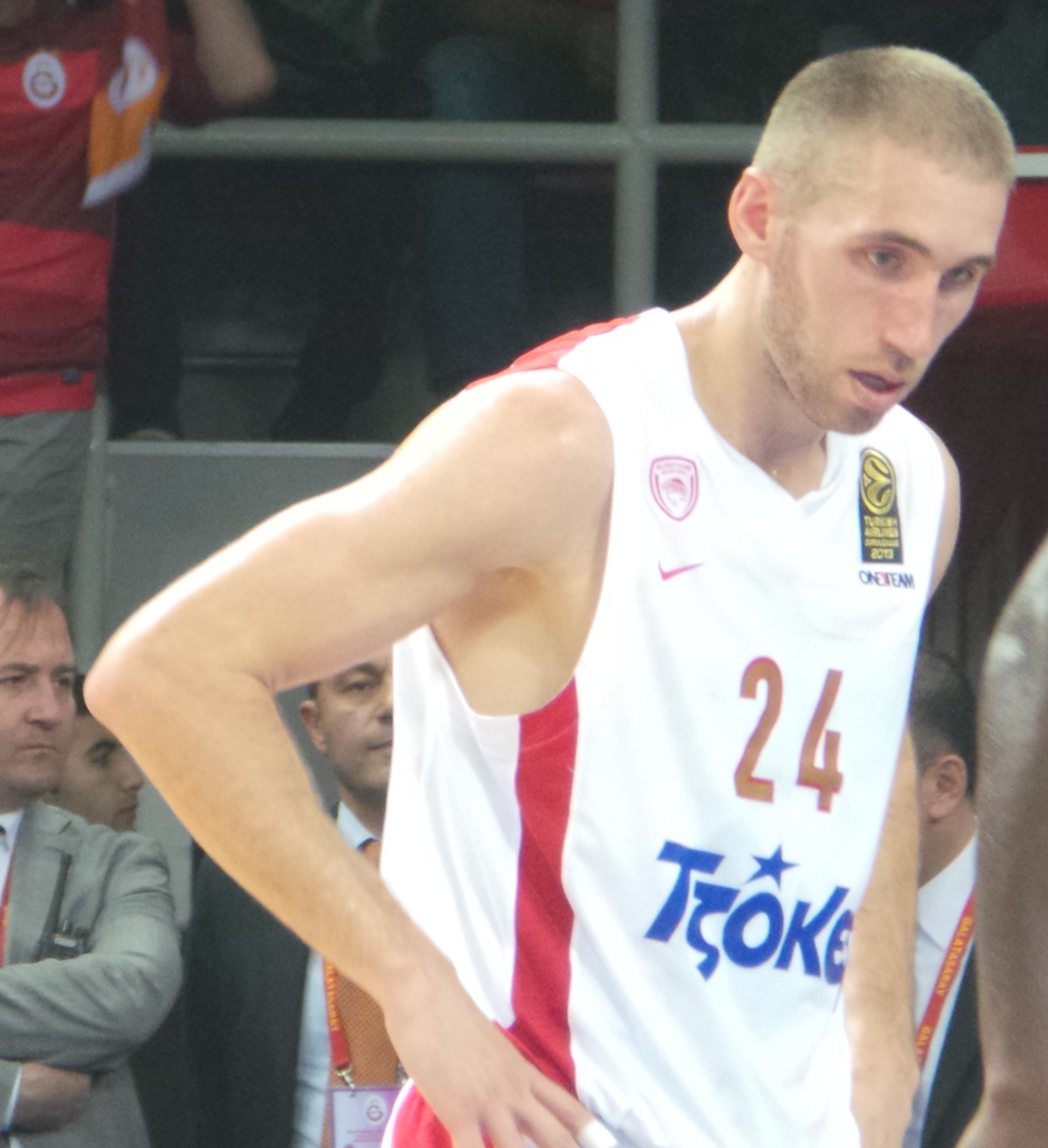
Matt Lojeski joined the team in 2021.

The Golden Eagles were placed in the 16-team Illinois Regional as the top seed.

==== Games ====
Date	Round	Location	Score	Opponent		Stats
Date	Round	Location	Score	Team	Seed	Stats
July 25	First round	Peoria Civic Center, Peoria, Illinois	94–66	B1 Ballers	Illinois No. 16	
July 26	Second round	Peoria Civic Center, Peoria, Illinois	71–64	Playing for Jimmy V	Illinois No. 9	
July 28	Regional semifinals	Peoria Civic Center, Peoria, Illinois	88–75	Autism Army	Illinois No. 5	
July 31	Regional final	UD Arena, Dayton, Ohio	69–73	Boeheim's Army	Illinois No. 3	

==== Players ====
- Maurice Acker
- Sacar Anim
- Vander Blue
- Dwight Buycks
- Elgin Cook
- Travis Diener
- Luke Fischer
- Matt Lojeski
- Andrew Rowsey
- Jarvis Williams
- Derrick Wilson
- Jamil Wilson
- Joe Chapman (coach)

=== 2022 ===
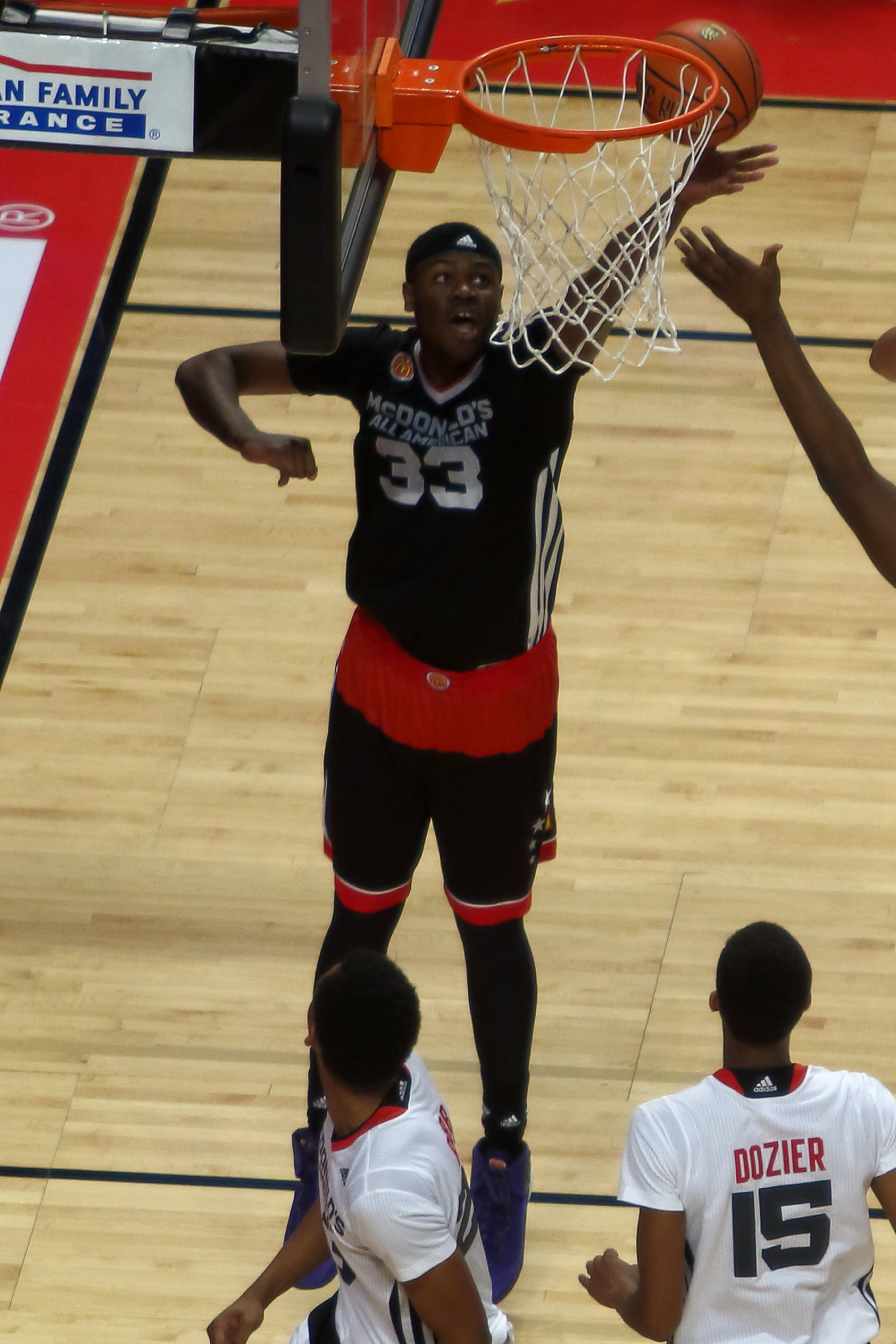
Diamond Stone was added to the roster for the 2022 tournament.

For TBT 2022, the team was seeded no. 2 in the Dayton Regional.

Date	Round	Location	Score	Opponent		Ref.
Date	Round	Location	Score	Team	Seed	Ref.
July 24	First round	UD Arena; Dayton, Ohio	77–72	Ohio 1804	Dayton No. 7	box
July 26	Second round	UD Arena; Dayton, Ohio	56–62	Red Scare	Dayton No. 3	box

==== Players ====
- Maurice Acker
- Sacar Anim
- Vander Blue
- Dwight Buycks
- Elgin Cook
- Travis Diener
- Luke Fischer
- Darius Johnson-Odom
- Diamond Stone
- Jarvis Williams
- Derrick Wilson
- Jamil Wilson
- Joe Chapman (coach)

== Record by years ==
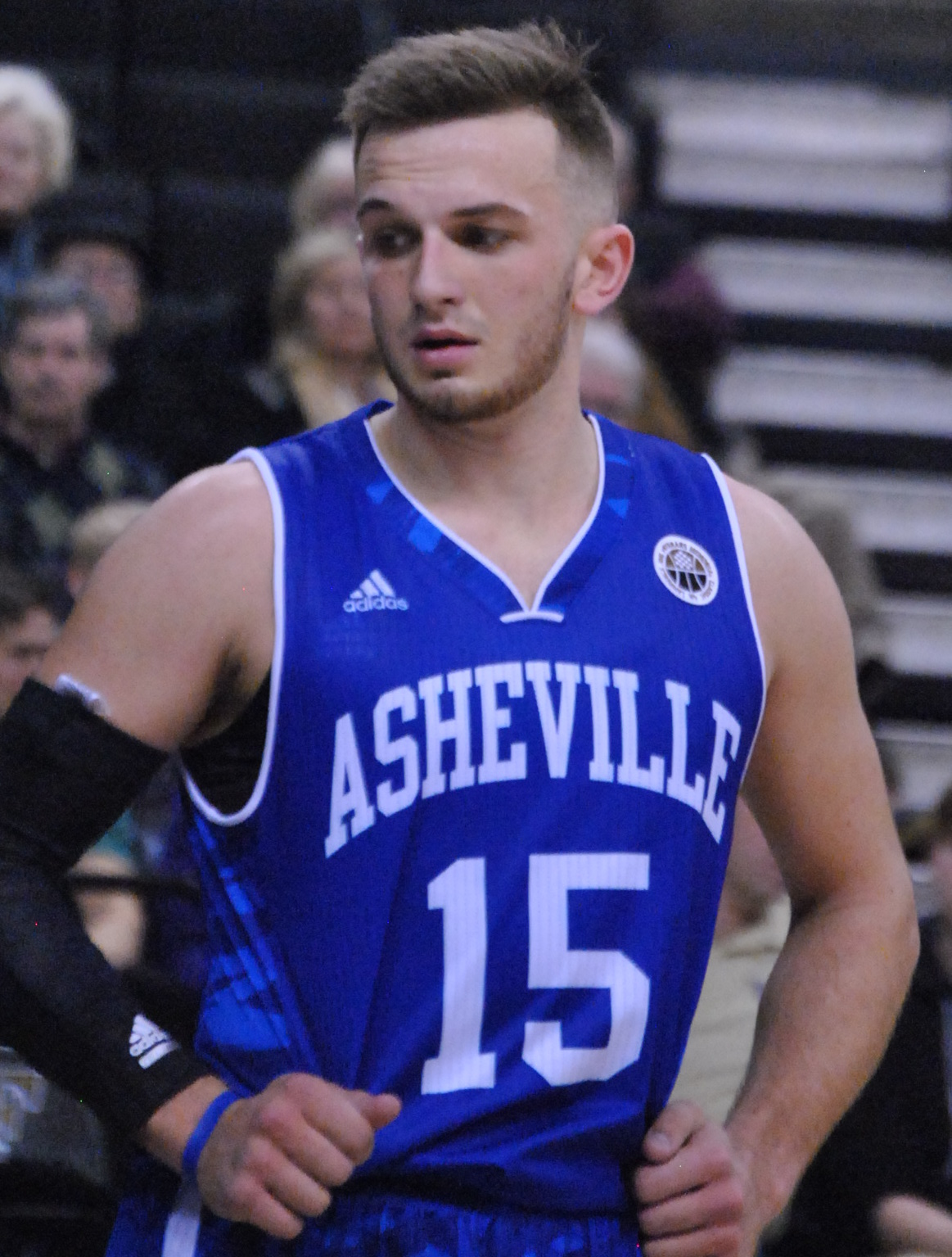
Andrew Rowsey joined the team in 2019.

Through the 2020 tournament, Golden Eagles recorded the second-most number of victories of any team competing in TBT, after four-time champion Overseas Elite.

Year	Seed	Won	Lost	Notes
2016	6th Midwest	3	1	lost in Quarterfinals
2017	1st Midwest	3	1	lost in Quarterfinals
2018	3rd Northeast	4	1	lost in Semifinals
2019	1st Wichita	5	1	lost in Final
2020	4th overall	4	0	Champions
2021	1st Illinois	3	1	lost in Quarterfinals
2022	2nd Dayton	1	1	lost in second round
Total		23	6	

== Awards ==
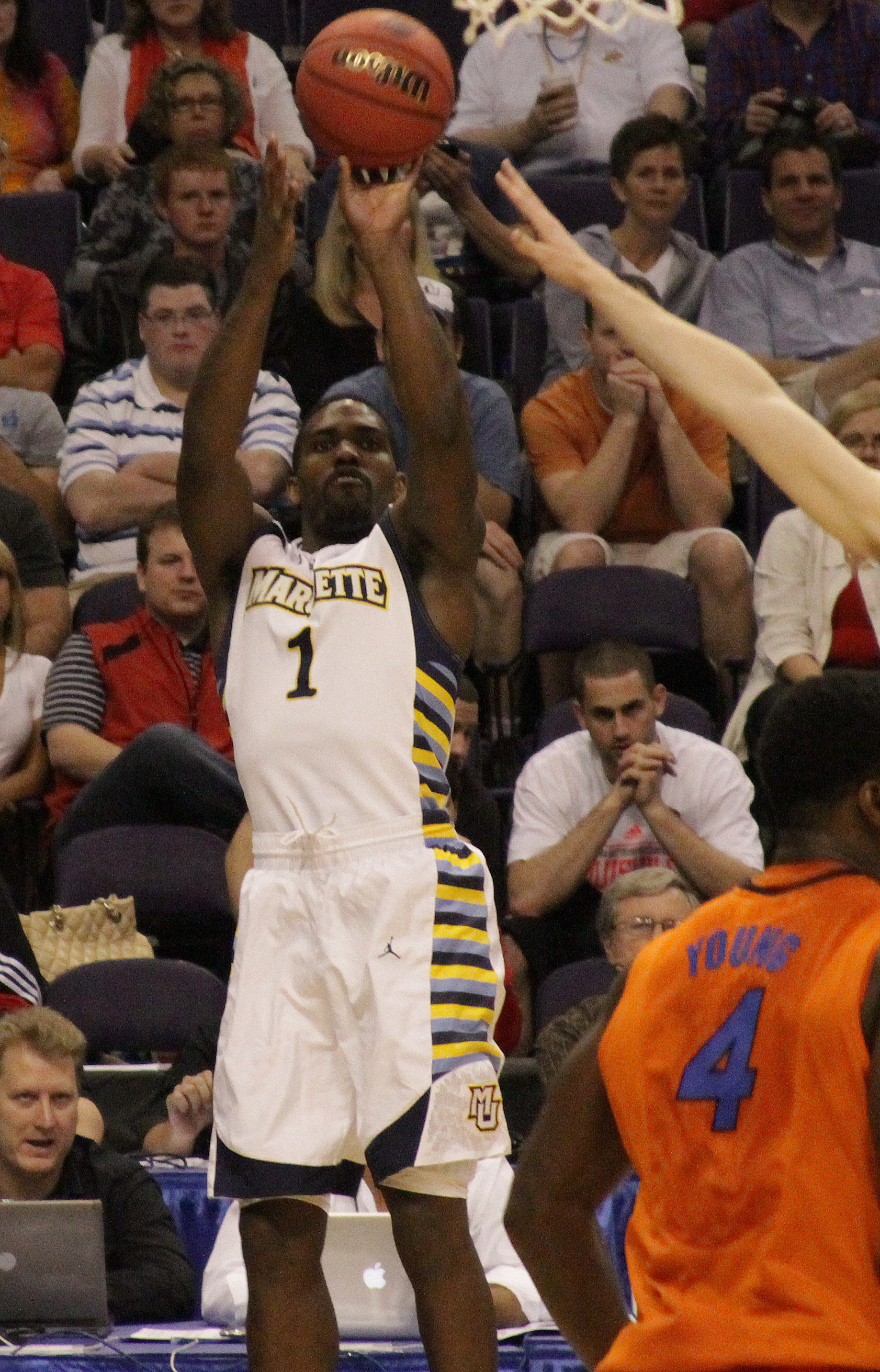
Darius Johnson-Odom was named the 2020 tournament MVP.

Year	Player	Award	Ref.
2016	Dwight Buycks	All-Tournament	
2018	Jamil Wilson	All-Tournament	
2019	Dwight Buycks	All-Tournament	
2019	Daniel Fitzgerald (GM)	All-Tournament	
2020	Darius Johnson-Odom	All-Tournament & MVP	
2020	Jamil Wilson	All-Tournament	
2020	Joe Chapman (Coach)	All-Tournament	
