= William Buford =

American basketball player (born 1990)

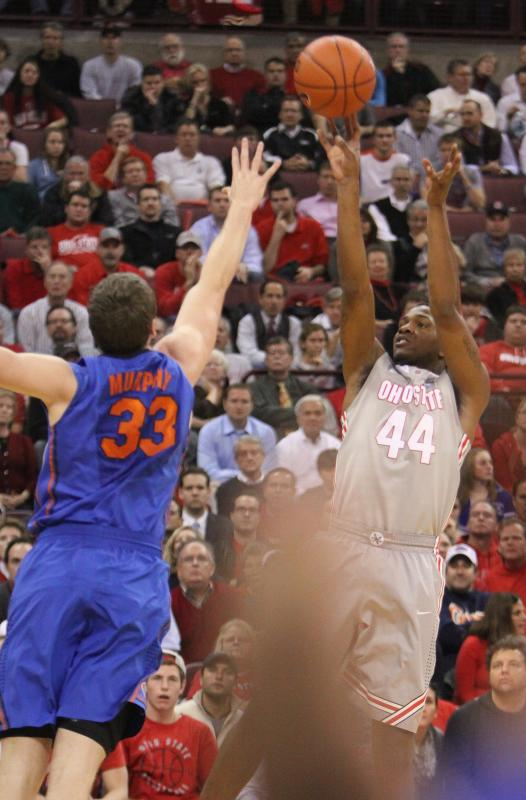
- Buford with Ohio State in 2011

No. 44 – s.Oliver Würzburg
- Position: Shooting guard
- League: Basketball Bundesliga

Personal information
- Born: January 10, 1990 (age 36) Toledo, Ohio, U.S.
- Listed height: 6 ft 5 in (1.96 m)
- Listed weight: 216 lb (98 kg)

Career information
- High school: Libbey (Toledo, Ohio)
- College: Ohio State (2008–2012)
- NBA draft: 2012: undrafted
- Playing career: 2012–present

Career history
- 2012–2013: Obradoiro CAB
- 2013–2014: Santa Cruz Warriors
- 2014: Canton Charge
- 2015: Texas Legends
- 2015–2016: Tigers Tübingen
- 2016–2017: Limoges CSP
- 2017: BCM Gravelines
- 2018: BG Göttingen
- 2019: Lavrio
- 2019–2020: Virtus Roma
- 2020–2021: Darüşşafaka Tekfen
- 2021–present: s.Oliver Würzburg

Career highlights
- 2× Second-team All-Big Ten (2011, 2012); Third-team All-Big Ten (2010); Big Ten Freshman of the Year (2009); Big Ten All-Freshman team (2009); First-team Parade All-American (2008); McDonald's All-American (2008); Ohio Mr. Basketball (2008)
- Stats at Basketball Reference

William Buford (born January 10, 1990) is an American professional basketball player for s.Oliver Würzburg of the Basketball Bundesliga. Buford played college basketball for the Ohio State Buckeyes. He has played professionally in the NBA G League and overseas in Spain, France, Germany, Italy, Turkey, and Greece.

== High school career ==
As a junior at Libbey High School, Buford averaged 28 points and 12 rebounds per game, earning All-State honors. During his senior season, Buford averaged 23 points and 11 rebounds per game. Buford was also named Ohio Mr. Basketball. Buford also participated in the McDonald's All-American Game and the Jordan Brand Classic.

== College career ==
=== Freshman season ===
In Buford's freshman season at Ohio State, he averaged 11.3 points and 3.7 rebounds per game. For the week of January 19, Buford was named the Big Ten Player of the Week, after averaging 17 points and 6 rebounds per game in two Ohio State wins. He was also named the Big Ten Freshman of the Year and was an Honorable Mention All-Big Ten selection.

=== Sophomore season ===
As a sophomore, Buford averaged 14.4 points and 5.7 rebounds per game. He was also a Third Team All Big-Ten selection.

=== Junior season ===
In his junior season at Ohio State, Buford averaged 14.4 points and 3.9 rebounds per game. He was also a Second Team All Big-Ten selection.

=== Senior season ===
Before his senior season at Ohio State, Buford was a preseason All Big-Ten selection, as well as a Top-50 Naismith and Wooden Award watch. In his senior season, Buford averaged 14.5 points and 4.9 rebounds per game. Following the season, Buford was named to the All Big-Ten Second Team. He was also named a Lowe's Senior Class Award finalist.

== Professional career ==
After going undrafted in the 2012 NBA draft, Buford joined the Minnesota Timberwolves for their pre-Summer League mini-camp and the Timberwolves' Las Vegas Summer League team. In two games with the Timberwolves, Buford recorded a total of five rebounds and two assists.

In August 2012, he signed his first professional contract with Blu:sens Monbús of Spain.

Buford joined the Utah Jazz for the 2013 NBA Summer League. In November 2013, he was acquired by the Santa Cruz Warriors. On March 8, 2014, he was traded to Canton Charge.

On November 2, 2014, Buford was reacquired by the Canton Charge. He was waived by Canton on December 17, 2014. On January 9, 2015, he was acquired by the Texas Legends.

On July 18, 2015, he signed with the Tigers Tübingen of the Basketball Bundesliga.

On June 10, 2016, he signed with Limoges CSP of the LNB Pro A.

On August 23, 2019, he has signed with Virtus Roma of the Italian Lega Basket Serie A (LBA).

On October 5, 2020, he has signed with Darüşşafaka of the Basketball Super League.

On August 6, 2021, Buford signed with s.Oliver Würzburg of the Basketball Bundesliga.

== See also ==
- The Basketball Tournament 2019, which named Buford as its MVP
