= Paul A. Flanagan =

Paul A. Flanagan was the State Deputy of Massachusetts in the Knights of Columbus from 2018 to 2020. His father, Newman A. Flanagan, and grandfather James H. Flanagan, were also state deputies. They are the only grandfather-father-son combination of state deputies in the history of the Knights of Columbus.

On July 10, 2018, he was honored at Fenway Park during the pregame ceremony for a Boston Red Sox game. He is a member of San Salvador number 200 in Stoughton, Massachusetts.

== Works cited ==
- Lapomarda, Vincent A. (1992). The Knights of Columbus in Massachusetts (second ed.). Norwood, Massachusetts: Knights of Columbus Massachusetts State Council.
