= List of Massachusetts State Deputies of the Knights of Columbus =

The Massachusetts State Deputy of the Knights of Columbus is the highest official in the Knights of Columbus within the Commonwealth of Massachusetts.

State Deputy	Term	Council	Total Members	Total Councils
James E. Hayes	1893–1897	Bunker Hill Council #62	~6,000	73
Edward L. Hearn	1897–1899	Coeur de Leon Council #87	~11,000	
James F. Cavanagh	1899–1901	Everett Council #97	12,873	122
Joseph C. Pelletier	1901–1906	Franklin Council #168	16,435	127
Daniel F. Buckley	1906–1908	North Easton Council #238	19,033	130
William J. O'Brien	1908–1912	Robert Fulton Council #134	23,742	138
Louis T. Watson	1912–1916	Brighton Council #121	31,815	142
Daniel J. Gallagher	1916–1918	Dorchester Lower Mills Council #180	34,466	
William J. Day	1918–1921	Bunker Hill Council #62	72,076	
William C. Prout	1921–1924	Back Bay Council #331	67,891 (Note: Membership peaked in 1922 with 72,943 knights.)	154
Edmund J. Brandon	1924–1927	Cambridge Council #74	58,557	
John E. Swift	1927–1930	Valencia Council #80	51,859	155
Joseph M. Kirby	1930–1934	Fr. John B. DeValles Council #213	42,587	155
Joseph H. Martin	1934–1936	Taunton Council #82	38,847	
Patrick J. Moynihan	1936–1938	Abp. John J. Williams Council #1308	37,971	153
John J. Spillane	1938–1940	Crusader Council #2706	36,697 (Note: Membership dipped in 1939 but then rose in 1940 for the first time in several years.)	
Walter G. Powers	1940–1942	Taunton Council #82	34,971	148
Frank W. Tomasello	1942–1944	North Quincy Council #22592	34,312	148
James H. Flanagan	1944–1946	Jamaica Plain Council #120	38,013	152
Joseph L. Francis	1946–1948	Dorchester Lower Mills Council #180	44,713	154
John W. McDevitt	1948–1950	Santa Maria Council #105	44,713	154
Joseph P. Lally	1950–1952	Mount Pleasant Council #98	47,942	154
Daniel J. Fitzgerald	1952–1954	Home City Council #63	50,157	162
Thomas J. Spring	1954–1956	Columbus Council #116	57,353	174
James H. Norton	1956–1958	Redberry Council #117	62,411	183
Thomas G. Feenan	1958–1960	Dorchester Lower Mills Council #180	66,651	193
Joseph E. Boothroyd	1960–1962	Maynard Council #2121	67,397	203
John T. Howland	1962–1964	Msgr. James J. Chittick Council #89	68,221	206
John J. McCullough	1964–1966	Reading Council #1031	68,517	209
John M. Cataldo	1966–1968	Ausonia Council #1513	65,517	211
John E. Nugent	1968–1970	North Cambridge Council #269	63,561	211
Gerard M. O'Meara	1970–1972	Dorchester Lower Mills Council #180	60,203	212
Michael E. Faherty	1972–1974	North Quincy Council #2259	59,414	208
Joseph Arena	1974–1976	St. Francis Council #2962	60,323	207
Francis A. Sheehan	1976–1978	Northampton Council #480	59,447	207
John J. Donovan	1978–1980	Norwood Council #252	59,548	207
Newman A. Flanagan	1980–1982	Cardinal O'Connell Council #2919	59,496	209
Kenneth C. Pearson	1982–1984	Stoneham Council #489	56,835	
Edmond J. Benoit	1984–1986	Mumford Council #365	55,730	
Walter L. Almond	1986–1988	Belmont Council #332	54,883	
John J. Rigali	1988–1990	Fairview Council #4044	53,883	
John F. Oteri	1990–1992	Columbus Council #116	53,547	217
Kenneth N. Ryan	1992–1994	Pere Marquette Council #271		
P. Frank Fougere	1994–1996	Coeur de Leon Council #87		
Peter J. Giordano	1996–1998	Belmont Council #332		225
James R. Sawyer	1998–2000	Falmouth Council #813	~50,000	
James W. Devine	2000–2001	Holyoke Council #90		
Thomas M. Ledbetter	2001–2004	Mt. Pleasant Council #98	~46,000	
Richard F. Guerriero	2004–2006	St Francis Xavier Council #5027	~46,000	
Vincent M. Rumasuglia	2006–2008	St. Raphael's Council # 11628		
William F. Donovan	2008–2010	Walpole Council # 1319	~45,000	
Michael J. Baldner	2010–2012	Dorchester Council #107		
Peter K. Healy	2012–2014	Fitchburg Council #99	~43,000	270
Russell A. Steinbach	2014–2016	Dorchester #107	~40,000	273
Paul G. O'Sullivan	2016–2018	Foxboro/Sharon #6063		287
Paul A. Flanagan	2018-2020	San Salvador #200	36,550	290
Michael Lesperence	2020-2022	Milville #11020		
Thomas Butler	2022-2024	Unity Council #2212		

== Works cited ==
- Lapomarda, Vincent A. (1992). The Knights of Columbus in Massachusetts (second ed.). Norwood, Massachusetts: Knights of Columbus Massachusetts State Council.
