= William C. Prout =

American athlete

William Christopher Prout (December 24, 1886 – August 4, 1927) was an American athlete. He competed at the 1908 Summer Olympics in London. He was president of the American Olympic Committee. He was also the tenth state deputy of the Massachusetts Knights of Columbus from 1921 to 1924. Prout stood for election to become the District Attorney of Suffolk County, Massachusetts, in 1926, but lost.

== Early life ==
William Prout was born in the West End of Boston, Massachusetts on December 24, 1886. He was frail as a child. He attended Boston Latin School and English High School in Andover, Massachusetts, and then Brown University and Boston University where he was president of his class. Prout is in the Brown University Athletic Hall of Fame.

== Athletics ==
Prout won his preliminary heat of the 400 metres at the 1908 Summer Olympics with a time of 50.4 seconds. He advanced to the semifinals, where he was eliminated following a fourth and last place finish in his semifinal heat.

He was elected president of the American Athletic Union in 1921. Prout founded the Boston Irish-American Athletic Association. From 1926 until his death, he was president of the American Olympic Committee.

== Knights of Columbus ==
Prout served as the tenth state deputy of the Massachusetts Knights of Columbus from 1921 to 1924. He was also a Supreme Director from 1922 to 1927. As a knight, he sponsored the resolution that led to the creation of the Columbian Squires.

For his service to the Catholic Church, he was made a knight of the Order of St. Gregory the Great in 1924.

== Works cited ==
- Lapomarda, Vincent A. (1992). The Knights of Columbus in Massachusetts (second ed.). Norwood, Massachusetts: Knights of Columbus Massachusetts State Council.
- Cook, Theodore Andrea (1908). The Fourth Olympiad, Being the Official Report. London: British Olympic Association.
- De Wael, Herman (2001). "Athletics 1908". Herman's Full Olympians. Archived from the original on 27 September 2006.
- Wudarski, Pawel (1999). "Wyniki Igrzysk Olimpijskich" (in Polish). Archived from the original on 16 February 2009.
