= Newman A. Flanagan =

American attorney and politician (1930–2025)

Newman Flanagan

District Attorney of Suffolk County
- In office 1979–1992
- Preceded by: Garrett H. Byrne
- Succeeded by: Ralph C. Martin II

Personal details
- Born: March 5, 1930 Roslindale, Boston, Massachusetts, U.S.
- Died: November 17, 2025 (aged 95)
- Children: Paul A. Flanagan
- Education: Boston College (BA); New England School of Law (JD)

Military service
- Branch/service: United States Navy
- Battles/wars: Korean War

Newman A. Flanagan (March 5, 1930 – November 17, 2025) was an American attorney and politician who served as the district attorney of Suffolk County, Massachusetts, from 1978 to 1992. Active in the Knights of Columbus, he served as a State Deputy of Massachusetts in the fraternal organization.

== Early life and education ==
Flanagan was born in the Roslindale neighborhood of Boston. He graduated from Boston College High School in 1947 and served in the United States Navy during the Korean War, where he won three battle stars and a unit citation.

After his service, he attended college, graduating in 1954 from Boston College. He studied for two years at Boston College Law School and transferred to New England Law Boston, where he graduated in 1957.

== Career ==
In May 1961, Flanagan began legal work for Suffolk County District Attorney Garrett H. Byrne and in November 1962 he was made an Assistant District Attorney. He prosecuted 2,500 cases, including a successful manslaughter case against physician Kenneth C. Edelin in 1975 for performing an abortion.

Edelin appealed the case. The 6-person Massachusetts Supreme Judicial Court unanimously ruled in 1976 to overturn the conviction. They stated strong disagreement with the prosecutor's theory, ruled on questions of interpretation, and formally acquitted Edelin, exonerating him.

Despite losing that appeal, Flanagan continued in his political career. He resigned his ADA position on December 31, 1977 and ran against the incumbent Byrne for the position of Suffolk County District Attorney. He beat Byrne and three others in the Democratic primary on September 19, 1978, and faced no opposition in the general election.

=== Handling of Carol Stuart murder case ===
During the manhunt for a purported Black suspect related to the murder of Carol Stuart, a pregnant white woman, and wounding of her husband, also white, Flanagan supported the false claim that the killer was a black man.

Flanagan's proposal gained some support in the state legislature. But the family of Charles Stuart, the white man who was Carol's husband, confessed that he had fabricated the story of a Black carjacker as a racist hoax to deflect the investigators' attention from his own role in the crime. He was successful for a time. Stuart committed suicide after his hoax was revealed. He was found to have killed his wife for insurance.

After news of the hoax was publicized, Flanagan resigned as District Attorney in 1992. He next served as the executive director of the National Association of District Attorneys.

== Legacy ==
In 2019, Suffolk County District Attorney Rachael Rollins formally apologized for the SCDA office's complicity in the Boston Police Department's "traumatizing, humiliating and assaulting black men of every age" in the Mission Hill neighborhood during the 1989 manhunt for Stuart's killer.

=== Knights of Columbus ===
Flanagan joined the Knights of Columbus, a Catholic fraternal organization, while at Boston College. He rose through the ranks and was elected State Deputy on May 18, 1980. He served until 1982.

His father, James H. Flanagan, had served as state deputy from 1944 to 1946. They were the only father-son duo to have served as state deputy in Massachusetts history and the sixth in the history of the order.

Flanagan's son Paul A. Flanagan was elected state deputy in 2018. The men became known as the first three-generation set of state deputies in the history of the Knights of Columbus. He went on to become a supreme director.

== Death ==
Flanagan died on November 17, 2025, at the age of 95.

== Works cited ==
- Lapomarda, Vincent A. (1992). The Knights of Columbus in Massachusetts (second ed.). Norwood, Massachusetts: Knights of Columbus Massachusetts State Council.
