= Thomas J. Spring =

Thomas J. Spring was an American judge and a State Deputy of Massachusetts for the Knights of Columbus.

Spring was born on July 31, 1904, to Francis and Catherine (Cronin) Spring. He attended Boston College, the Staley School of the Spoken Word, and Northeastern University School of Law. One of his children with his wife, Gertrude J. McCabe, had Governor Paul A. Dever as a godfather.

In November 1951, Spring was appointed a judge in Roxbury District Court. On December 7, 1960, he was sworn in by Governor Foster Furcolo as a justice of the Massachusetts Superior Court. He retired in 1975 and in 1980 became a Commissioner of the United States Courts.

On May 16, 1954, he was elected State Deputy of the Knights of Columbus. Under his leadership, Massachusetts experienced the largest increase in councils in the 20th century. He was a master of the fourth degree.

Spring was buried in Milton Cemetery.

== Works cited ==
- Lapomarda, Vincent A. (1992). The Knights of Columbus in Massachusetts (second ed.). Norwood, Massachusetts: Knights of Columbus Massachusetts State Council.
