= Garrett H. Byrne =

American lawyer and politician

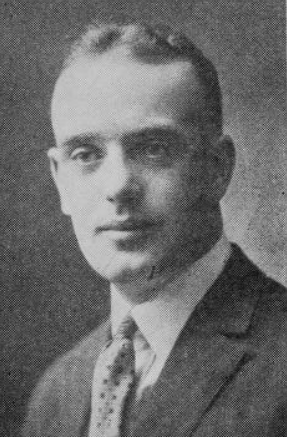

District Attorney of Suffolk County, Massachusetts
- In office 1952–1979
- Preceded by: William J. Foley
- Succeeded by: Newman A. Flanagan

Personal details
- Born: November 29, 1897 Roxbury, Massachusetts
- Died: September 21, 1989 (aged 91) Milton, Massachusetts
- Party: Democratic
- Education: Burdett College; Boston University; Suffolk Law School
- Occupation: Lawyer

Garrett H. Byrne (November 29, 1897 – September 21, 1989) was an American lawyer and politician who served as District Attorney of Suffolk County, Massachusetts, from 1952 to 1979.

== Early life ==
Byrne was born on November 29, 1897, in Roxbury, Boston. He attended Mechanic Arts High School, Burdett College, Boston University, and Suffolk Law School. He passed the bar in 1923 and began practicing law following his graduation the next year. During World War I, he served in the United States Navy.

== Political career ==
From 1925 to 1929, Byrne represented the 12th Suffolk District in the Massachusetts House of Representatives. In 1928 he was an unsuccessful candidate for Suffolk County Registrar of Deeds.

In 1933, Byrne joined the Suffolk County District Attorney's office, where he developed a close relationship with DA William J. Foley. He tried a number of murder cases and beginning in 1942 he exclusively handled grand jury work. A close friend of Governor Paul A. Dever, Byrne was mentioned as a candidate for a number of prominent positions, including Boston Police Commissioner.

Foley died on December 1, 1952, and on December 17, Dever appointed Byrne to succeed him. Byrne was chosen despite pressure to give the job to William J. Foley Jr., a fellow assistant district attorney and Boston City Councilor, or another well known political figure. Following his appointment, Byrne gave up his private law practice, making him the first district attorney in Massachusetts not to have any outside business or professional activities. Throughout his tenure as DA, Byrne opposed Boston's Combat Zone. Following the murder of Andrew Puopolo, Byrne received the support of Mayor Kevin White and the Boston Redevelopment Authority and began a crackdown on the vice district. Byrne also established the Suffolk County Investigation and Prosecution Project (SCIPP) to combat organized and white collar crime and the Major Violators Division to expedite to prosecution of violent crimes. SCIPP's work with the Federal Bureau of Investigation and Bureau of Alcohol, Tobacco, Firearms and Explosives led to convictions of organized crime leaders Raymond L. S. Patriarca, Enrico Tameleo, Peter Limone, and Ilario Zannino and political figures Paul J. Ellison and George Maitland. Byrne was also the lead prosecutor of the perpetrators of the Great Brink's Robbery, as the federal statute of limitations had expired and only state charges could be brought against the gang. In 1965, Byrne had the Muhammad Ali vs. Sonny Liston rematch banned from Boston, calling it a "setup", "unlicensed", and a "common nuisance." As a result, the fight was moved to Lewiston, Maine. In 1978, Byrne, then 80, was defeated in the Democratic primary by his former assistant district attorney, Newman A. Flanagan, who claimed that Byrne was too old to "fight the war against crime". During the campaign, the Boston Finance Commission announced that Byrne had "misrepresented" the qualifications of a company in order to grant two no-bid contracts to a former legal aide.

Byrne died on September 21, 1989, in Milton, Massachusetts.

== See also ==
- 1925–1926 Massachusetts legislature
- 1927–1928 Massachusetts legislature
