= Maurice Acker =

American basketball player

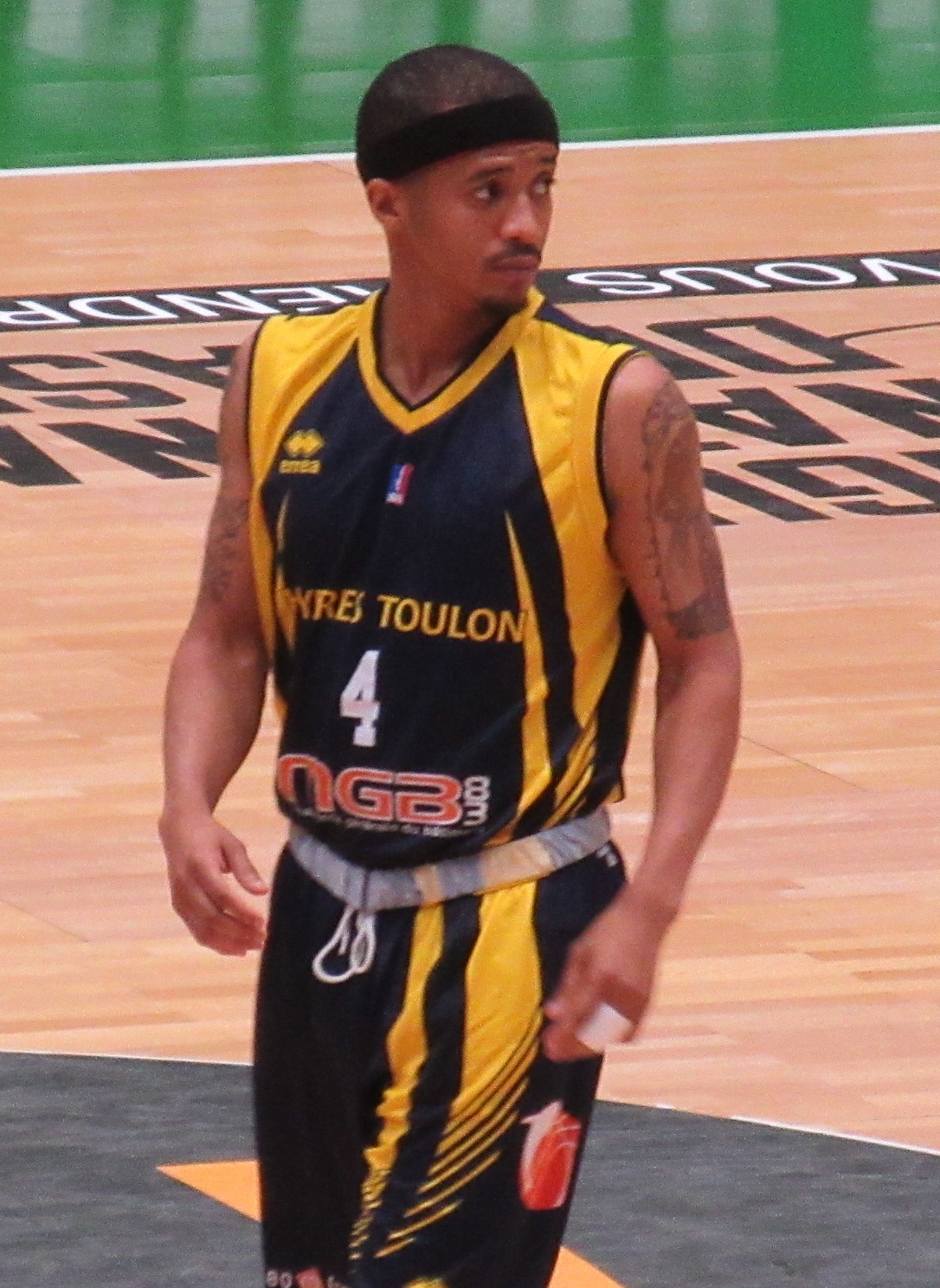
- Acker with Hyères-Toulon in 2017

Personal information
- Born: June 25, 1987 (age 39) Hazel Crest, Illinois, U.S.
- Listed height: 5 ft 8 in (1.73 m)
- Listed weight: 165 lb (75 kg)

Career information
- High school: Hillcrest (Country Club Hills, Illinois)
- College: Ball State (2005–2006); Marquette (2007–2010)
- NBA draft: 2010: undrafted
- Playing career: 2010–2023
- Position: Point guard

Career history
- 2010–2011: Quebec Kebs
- 2011: Bucaneros de La Guaira
- 2011–2012: Matrixx Magixx
- 2012: Trefl Sopot
- 2012–2013: Nová Ves
- 2013–2014: Denain
- 2014–2015: Bakken Bears
- 2015–2017: Hyères-Toulon
- 2017–2019: Lille Métropole
- 2019-2020: Caen Basket Calvados
- 2022-2023: Pays Salonais Basket 13

Career highlights
- DBL All-Star (2012); MAC Freshman of the Year (2006)

Maurice Orlando Acker (born June 25, 1987) is an American professional basketball player who played for Lille Métropole BC. He was a standout college player for the Marquette Golden Eagles. He played high school basketball at Hillcrest High School, a teammate of Marquette alumni Jerel McNeal. He was drafted in the eighth round of the 2010 NBA D League Draft by the Bakersfield Jam, but was waived in November of that year.

== College career ==
Maurice averaged 9.2 points, 4.6 assists and 2.4 rebounds in 31.7 minutes and started in all 28 games as a freshman at Ball State University. He was named Mid-American Conference Freshman of the Year in 2005–06. After his freshman season he transferred to Marquette University and sat out the 2006–07 season before suiting up as a sophomore in 2007–08. In the 2008–09 season, Acker took over the starting point guard position because regular starter Dominic James broke his ankle in a loss to the Connecticut Huskies, and started the rest of the season in his place. He started almost every game in the 2009–10 season, averaging 29.2 minutes, 8.7 points, 3.7 assists, and an impressively low 1.2 turnovers per game.

== The Basketball Tournament ==
Acker played for the Golden Eagles in the 2018 edition of The Basketball Tournament (TBT). In five games, he averaged 14.8 points, 7.8 assists, and played team-leading 28.8 minutes per game all while shooting 50 percent from the field. The Golden Eagles reached the semi-finals before falling to Overseas Elite. In 2020, Acker was a member of the Golden Eagles team that won the tournament.

== Personal life ==
Acker is the son of Maurice Sr and Renee Acker. He has two sisters.
