= Jeff Gibbs =

American basketball player (born 1980)

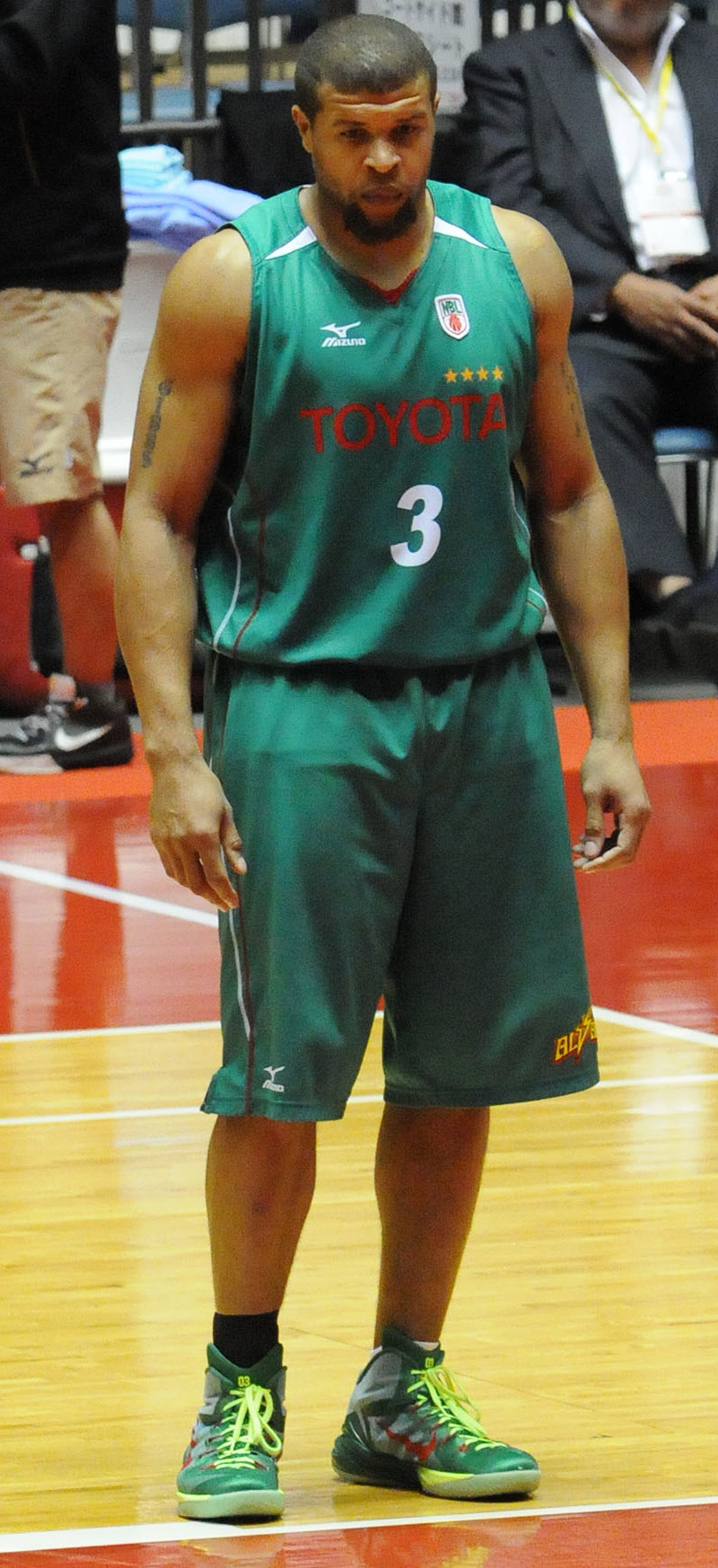

No. 4 – Koshigaya Alphas
- Position: Power forward
- League: B.League

Personal information
- Born: August 4, 1980 (age 46) Columbus, Ohio, U.S.
- Listed height: 188 cm (6 ft 2 in)
- Listed weight: 111 kg (245 lb)

Career information
- High school: Columbus East (Columbus, Ohio)
- College: Otterbein (1999–2002)
- NBA draft: 2003: undrafted
- Playing career: 2004–present

Career history
- 2004–2005: TSG Humana Ehingen
- 2005–2009: Ratiopharm Ulm
- 2009–2010: Eisbären Bremerhaven
- 2010–2016: Toyota Alvark
- 2016–2021: Link Tochigi Brex
- 2021–2023: Nagasaki Velca
- 2023–2024: Sun Rockers Shibuya
- 2024–present: Koshigaya Alphas

Career highlights
- 4× All-German League (2007–2010); NABC Division III Player of the Year (2002); First-team Division III All-American (2002); 2xOAC Player of the Year (2000, 2002); 3× First-team All-OAC (2000–2002)

Jeffrey Gibbs (born August 4, 1980) is an American professional basketball player for the Koshigaya Alphas of the B.League. Gibbs played college basketball for Otterbein University and is a professional player since 2004.

== College career ==
Gibbs played basketball and football at Otterbein University and won All-America honors in both sports. He left Otterbein as the leading rebounder (1496) and fifth all-time leading scorer (1924). As a senior, Gibbs averaged 23.5 points, 16.3 rebounds, 3.4 assists, 2.4 blocks and 2.3 steals a contest en route to capturing the 2002 NCAA Division III championship, while earning NABC NCAA Division III Player of the Year honors and making the D3hoops.com All-America First Team. He was later named to the D3hoops.com All-Decade Second Team. Gibbs was inducted into the Otterbein University Hall of Fame in 2008.

== Professional career ==
After a short stint in the CBA and after playing in Pro-Am Leagues, Summer Leagues and on a touring team, Gibbs signed his first overseas contract in January 2004, when he joined German second-division side TSG Ehingen. In his second year in Germany, Gibbs took home Eurobasket.com All-2. Bundesliga Second Team distinction and headed to ratiopharm Ulm for the 2005–06 campaign. Averaging a double-double (16.3 ppg, 12.0rpg) on the season, he helped the Ulm team win the championship in the 2. Bundesliga South division and promotion to the country's top-flight Basketball Bundesliga. For his efforts, Gibbs received 2006 Eurobasket.com All-German 2. Bundesliga Forward of the Year honors.

Gibbs led Germany's top division in rebounding four straight seasons (2006–2010), garnering Eurobasket.com All-German Bundesliga First Team honors in 2007 and 2009 and attending the German All Star Game twice. Due to his rebounding prowess at only 6 ft 2 in (1.88 m), he was given the nickname "Mr. Incredible" in Germany. He had spent the 2009–10 season with Eisbären Bremerhaven and signed with Toyota Alvark of Japan prior to the 2010–11 campaign. In his six-year stint with the club, Gibbs helped Alvark win the 2012 JBL Superleague Championship and the 2012 Emperor's Cup. He was recognized with Asia-Basket.com All-Japanese JBL Superleague First Team honors in 2013 and participated in the JBL All Star Game the same year. In 2016, he received Asia-Basket.com All-Japanese NBL Defensive Player of the Year and All-NBL First Team honors.

Gibbs inked a deal with Link Tochigi Brex of Japan's B.League in 2016.

== Career statistics ==
Legend
GP	Games played	GS	Games started	MPG	Minutes per game
FG%	Field goal percentage	3P%	3-point field goal percentage	FT%	Free throw percentage
RPG	Rebounds per game	APG	Assists per game	SPG	Steals per game
BPG	Blocks per game	PPG	Points per game	**Bold**	Career high

†	Denotes seasons in which Gibbs won an championship
*	Led the league

Year	Team	GP	GS	MPG	FG%	3P%	FT%	RPG	APG	SPG	BPG	PPG
2013–14	Toyota	52	47	25.6	.575	.433	.766	10.4	1.9	1.9	1.2	17.7
2014–15	Toyota	50	17	22.9	.571	.284	.815	8.9	2.2	2.2*	0.6	16.3
2015–16	Toyota	54	48	26.3	.523	.393	.799	9.2	2.9	2.0*	0.7	14.9
2016–17†	Tochigi	55	2	20.5	.513	.180	.820	8.0	1.9	1.6	0.5	12.3
2017–18	Tochigi	35	29	21.9	.492	.294	.822	7.0	1.7	1.3	0.8	11.7
