= Daniel J. Fitzgerald =

American civil servant

Daniel Joseph Fitzgerald (June 9, 1898 – March 12, 1990) was the Hampden County, Massachusetts Registrar of Probate and a State Deputy of Massachusetts for the Knights of Columbus.

Fitzgerald was born June 9, 1898, in Springfield, Massachusetts, to Thomas J. and Nellie V. (Moriaty) Fitzgerald. He had a brother, Gerald, and a sister, Mae. He graduated from Technical High School in 1917 and Bay Path Institute in 1918, both in Springfield. He served in the Army as a private during World War I and the Navy in World War II as a yeoman first class. He married Marguerite A. O'Donnell, but she died on December 12, 1936, after 15 months of marriage.

He was elected the Hampden County Registrar of Probate and retired on July 1, 1968, after 35 years in office. Prior to that we worked in the Registry. He was also a Knight of Malta. Fitzgerald was elected on in 1952 as the Massachusetts State Deputy of the Knights of Columbus. He was the first man from Western Massachusetts to hold the post.

Fitzgerald lived at 179 Thompson St. in Springfield. He died March 12, 1990, and is buried in Calvary Cemetery in Chicopee.

== Works cited ==
- Lapomarda, Vincent A. (1992). The Knights of Columbus in Massachusetts (second ed.). Norwood, Massachusetts: Knights of Columbus Massachusetts State Council.
