= Darius Johnson-Odom =

American basketball player (born 1989)

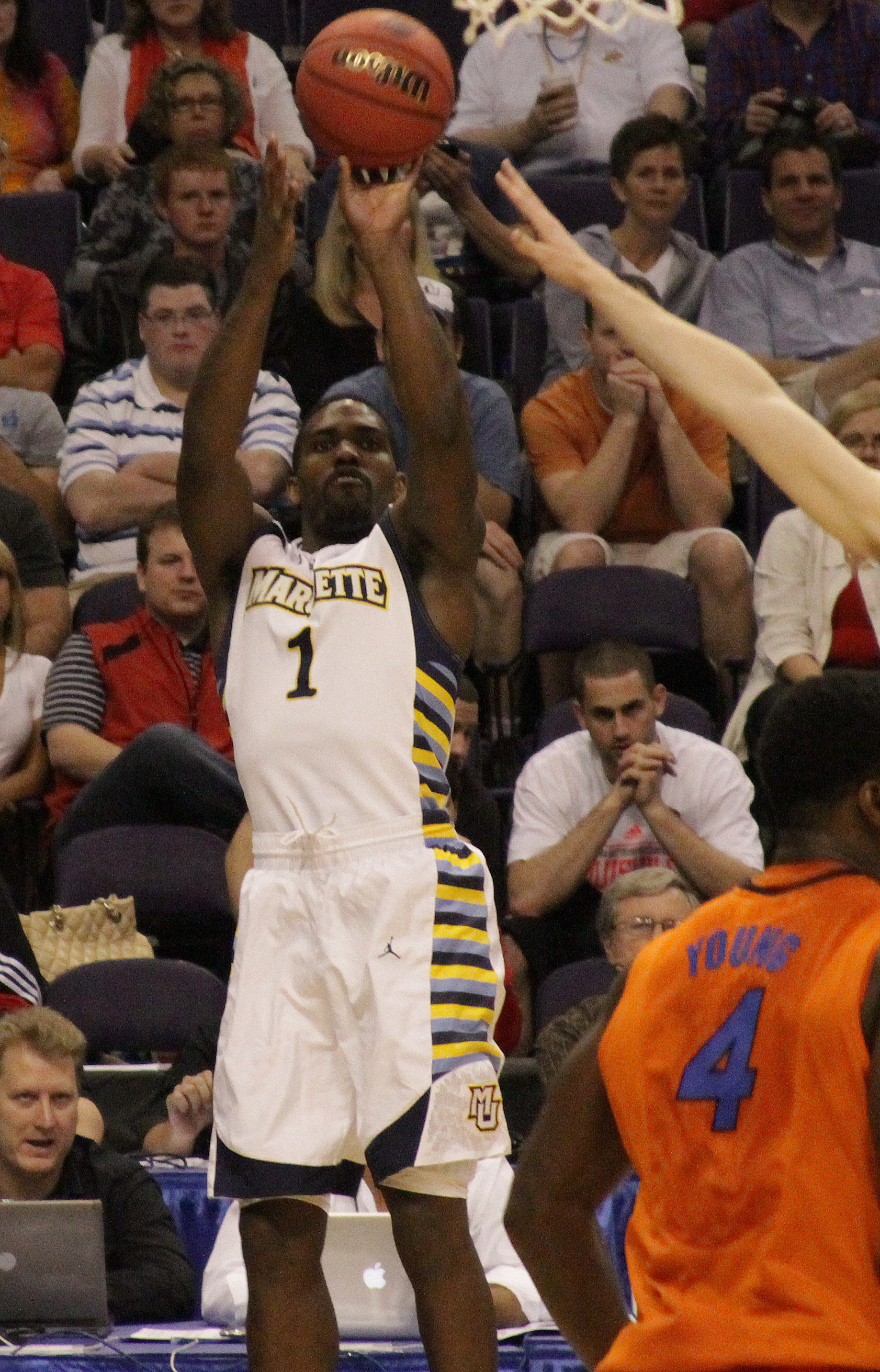

Free agent
- Position: Point guard / shooting guard

Personal information
- Born: September 28, 1989 (age 37) Raleigh, North Carolina, U.S.
- Listed height: 6 ft 2 in (1.88 m)
- Listed weight: 216 lb (98 kg)

Career information
- High school: Wakefield (Raleigh, North Carolina)
- College: Hutchinson CC (2008–2009); Marquette (2009–2012)
- NBA draft: 2012: 2nd round, 55th overall pick
- Drafted by: Dallas Mavericks
- Playing career: 2012–present

Career history
- 2012–2013: Los Angeles Lakers
- 2012–2013: →Los Angeles D-Fenders
- 2013: Spartak St. Petersburg
- 2013: Sichuan Blue Whales
- 2014: Springfield Armor
- 2014: Philadelphia 76ers
- 2014–2015: Pallacanestro Cantù
- 2015: Trabzonspor
- 2016: Olympiacos
- 2016–2017: Dinamo Sassari
- 2017–2018: Vanoli Cremona
- 2018–2019: Iowa Wolves
- 2019–2020: Pallacanestro Reggiana
- 2020–2021: Orléans Loiret Basket
- 2021–2022: Le Mans Sarthe
- 2022–2023: Rapid București
- 2024: Orléans Loiret Basket
- 2024–2026: Al-Difaa Al-Jawi
- 2026: Astros de Jalisco

Career highlights
- First-team All-Big East (2012)
- Stats at NBA.com
- Stats at Basketball Reference

Darius "Darjo" Earvin Johnson-Odom (born September 28, 1989) is an American professional basketball player who last played for the Astros de Jalisco of the Mexican CIBACOPA. In 2009, he transferred to Marquette University from Hutchinson Community College. As a senior, Johnson-Odom was named first-team All-Big East.

== Player profile ==
Johnson-Odom is listed as a 6'2" tall (1.88 m) and 100 kg (220 lb.) point guard-shooting guard. He was measured at 6'3" tall with shoes on at the 2012 NBA draft combine.

== Professional career ==
Johnson-Odom spent three seasons at Marquette University before he was selected 55th overall in the 2012 NBA draft by the Dallas Mavericks, who immediately traded him to the Los Angeles Lakers. Johnson-Odom was assigned to the Lakers' D-League team, the Los Angeles D-Fenders, several times during 2012–13 season.

On January 7, 2013, Johnson-Odom was waived by the Lakers. It was the final day for NBA teams to cut players on non-guaranteed contracts before their contracts became guaranteed for the season. He played four games and had just 6 minutes in total for the Lakers, spending most of his time in the D-League where he was the D-Fenders' leading scorer, averaging 21 points per game.

On January 24, 2013, Johnson-Odom joined Spartak St. Petersburg of Russia for the remainder of the 2012–13 season.

He joined the Boston Celtics for the 2013 Orlando Summer League. On September 25, 2013, he re-signed with the Lakers. However, he was later waived again on October 16. On October 18, 2013, he signed with the Sichuan Blue Whales of China. In November 2013, just four games into the season, he left the Blue Whales.

On January 3, 2014, he was acquired by the Springfield Armor.

On March 14, 2014, he signed a 10-day contract with the Philadelphia 76ers. On March 24, 2014, he was not offered a second 10-day contract after his first 10-day contract expired. Johnson-Odom has not played in an NBA game since.

During his time in the NBA, Johnson-Odom tied Luther Green's NBA record for most career field goal attempts without a made field goal, going 0–11 on field goals in his 21 minutes of NBA play. However, Green did score 3 points in his career, all of which came from free throws; Johnson-Odom, however, went 0-2 from the free throw line throughout his 7-game NBA career, never scoring a single point. This makes Johnson-Odom the record-holder for the most career field goal attempts with 0 career points scored. Johnson-Odom also holds the record for the most career games played without scoring any points, at 7; second on the list are Pete Nance and Martynas Andriuškevičius, with 6 career games. He is second in minutes played (MP) without scoring a point, with 21 MP, behind Patricio Garino (43 MP).

On August 2, 2014, he signed with Pallacanestro Cantù of Italy for the 2014–15 season.

On June 14, 2015, Johnson-Odom signed with Trabzonspor of the Turkey for the 2015–16 season. On December 28, 2015, he left Trabzonspor and signed with Olympiacos Piraeus of Greece for the rest of the season.

On June 11, 2016, Johnson-Odom signed with Dinamo Sassari of Italy for the 2016–17 season. On February 1, 2017, he left Sassari and signed with Vanoli Cremona for the rest of the season. On September 28, 2017, he re-signed with Cremona.

On September 24, 2018, Johnson-Odom signed with the Minnesota Timberwolves. This came after it was announced that an Italian anti-doping court suspended him for eight months after he tested positive to a THC test on May 6, 2018. On October 13, 2018, he was waived by the Timberwolves. Johnson-Odom was added to the Iowa Wolves opening night roster. Appearing in 49 games, Johnson-Odom led the 2018–19 Wolves in points per game among players of any service time, putting up 22.5 points per game.

On March 25, 2019, Johnson-Odom signed with Reggio Emilia in the Italian Lega Basket Serie A (LBA). On July 25, 2019, he extended his contract with Reggio Emilia for 2 more years.

On July 21, 2020, Johnson-Odom signed with Orléans Loiret Basket of the French Pro A.

On October 26, 2021, Johnson-Odom signed with Le Mans Sarthe of the LNB Pro A.

On July 21, 2022, he has signed with Rapid București of the Liga Națională.

On February 19, 2024, Johnson-Odom signed with Orléans Loiret Basket of the LNB Pro B. He averaged 13.9 points and 6.4 assists per game across 16 appearances.

On September 21, 2024, Johnson-Odom signed with Al-Difaa Al-Jawi of the Iraqi Basketball Premier League.

== The Basketball Tournament ==
Johnson-Odom has played in The Basketball Tournament (TBT), a million-dollar winner-take-all annual tournament, as a member of the Golden Eagles, a team mainly consisting of former Marquette players. He first played on the team in TBT 2016 and TBT 2017. He next played in TBT 2020, when the team won the tournament and its $1 million prize. Johnson-Odom was named MVP of the tournament. He averaged 16.8 points, 1.5 assists and 1.0 steals per game and had 15 points in the title game. He returned to the Golden Eagles for TBT 2022.

== Career statistics ==
Legend
GP	Games played	GS	Games started	MPG	Minutes per game
FG%	Field goal percentage	3P%	3-point field goal percentage	FT%	Free throw percentage
RPG	Rebounds per game	APG	Assists per game	SPG	Steals per game
BPG	Blocks per game	PPG	Points per game	**Bold**	Career high

=== College ===
Year	Team	GP	GS	MPG	FG%	3P%	FT%	RPG	APG	SPG	BPG	PPG
2009–10	Marquette	34	22	29.7	**.455**	**.474**	.677	2.7	2.4	**.9**	**.2**	13.0
2010–11	Marquette	**37**	**35**	30.0	.433	.364	.708	3.0	2.4	.8	**.2**	15.8
2011–12	Marquette	34	33	**32.9**	.447	.385	**.764**	**3.5**	**2.7**	**.9**	.1	**18.3**
Career		105	90	30.8	.443	.402	.722	3.1	2.5	.9	.2	15.7

=== NBA ===
==== Regular season ====
Year	Team	GP	GS	MPG	FG%	3P%	FT%	RPG	APG	SPG	BPG	PPG
2012–13	L.A. Lakers	**4**	0	1.5	.000	.000	.000	**1.0**	**.3**	.0	.0	.0
2013–14	Philadelphia	3	0	**5.0**	.000	.000	.000	.7	**.3**	**.3**	.0	.0
Career		7	0	3.0	.000	.000	.000	.9	.3	.1	.0	.0

=== NBA D-League ===
==== Regular season ====
Year	Team	GP	GS	MPG	FG%	3P%	FT%	RPG	APG	SPG	BPG	PPG
2012–13	Los Angeles	13	13	**39.8**	.440	**.393**	**.817**	**5.2**	5.2	1.3	**.2**	21.0
2013–14	Springfield	**27**	**26**	35.9	**.453**	.356	.815	4.4	**6.1**	**1.4**	**.2**	**22.0**
Career		40	39	37.2	.448	.369	.816	4.7	5.8	1.4	.2	21.7

=== International Leagues ===
==== Regular season ====
Year	Team	GP	GS	MPG	FG%	3P%	FT%	RPG	APG	SPG	BPG	PPG
2012–13	St. Petersburg	**13**	**4**	10.3	.418	.200	.692	.9	.9	.3	.0	5.3
2013–14	Sichuan	5	0	**30.8**	**.596**	**.556**	**.806**	**3.4**	**2.2**	**.6**	**.2**	**20.4**
Career		18	4	16.0	.509	.294	.758	1.6	1.2	.4	.1	9.5
