= Jerel McNeal =

American basketball player (born 1987)

Personal information
- Born: June 1, 1987 (age 39) Chicago, Illinois, U.S.
- Listed height: 6 ft 3 in (1.91 m)
- Listed weight: 200 lb (91 kg)

Career information
- High school: Hillcrest (Country Club Hills, Illinois)
- College: Marquette (2005–2009)
- NBA draft: 2009: undrafted
- Playing career: 2009–2020
- Position: Point guard / shooting guard

Career history
- 2009–2010: Dexia Mons-Hainaut
- 2010–2011: Rio Grande Valley Vipers
- 2011–2012: Sutor Basket Montegranaro
- 2012–2013: Bakersfield Jam
- 2013: Zhejiang Golden Bulls
- 2014–2015: Bakersfield Jam
- 2015: Phoenix Suns
- 2015–2016: Aris Thessaloniki
- 2016–2017: Brose Bamberg
- 2017–2019: Hapoel Tel Aviv
- 2019–2020: Ironi Nahariya

Career highlights
- Israeli League All-Star (2019); All-Greek League Second Team (2016); All-Greek League Defensive Team (2016); NBA D-League All-Star (2013); All-NBA D-League First Team (2013); 2× All-NBA D-League Third Team (2011, 2015); NBA D-League Impact Player of the Year (2015); Second-team All-American – AP, SN (2009); Third-team All-American – NABC (2009); Big East Defensive Player of the Year (2007); Third-team Parade All-American (2005)
- Stats at NBA.com
- Stats at Basketball Reference

Jerel McNeal (born June 1, 1987) is an American former professional basketball player. He played college basketball for Marquette University before playing professionally in Belgium, the NBA D-League, Italy, China, Greece, Germany and Israel, including a short stint in the NBA with the Phoenix Suns in 2014.

== Early life ==
McNeal was born in Chicago, Illinois to parents Edward and Meryln McNeal. He has 2 siblings (January and Jeremy). He attended Hillcrest High School along with point guard Maurice Acker, an eventual college teammate. McNeal was a third-team Parade All-American in 2005.

== College career ==
McNeal won the Big East's Defensive Player of the Year award as a sophomore in the 2006–07 season and was the only guard on the Big East's All-First Team in 2008–09. McNeal was an Associated Press second team All-American in 2008–09 as well.

On February 10, 2009, in a 102–84 loss at Villanova, McNeal broke George Thompson's 41-year-old school record of 1,773 points. Markus Howard passed McNeal for the Marquette scoring record, but McNeal remains Marquette's all-time leader in steals, field goals made, and field goal attempts. He is third all-time in games played and seventh in assists.

== Professional career ==
=== 2009–10 season ===
After going undrafted in the 2009 NBA draft, McNeal joined the Sacramento Kings for the 2009 Las Vegas Summer League. On September 28, 2009, he signed with the Los Angeles Clippers. However, he was waived on October 19, 2009. In November 2009, he signed with Dexia Mons-Hainaut of Belgium for the 2009–10 season. In March 2010, he left Dexia after drawing a two-week suspension for a positive marijuana test.

=== 2010–11 season ===
In July 2010, he joined the Charlotte Bobcats for the Orlando Summer League and the Chicago Bulls for the Las Vegas Summer League. On October 9, 2010, he signed with the Houston Rockets. However, he was waived by the Rockets on October 18. On October 30, 2010, he was acquired by the Rio Grande Valley Vipers. On March 9, 2011, he signed a 10-day contract with the New Orleans Hornets. On March 19, he returned to the Vipers after his 10-day contract expired. He did not appear in a game for the Hornets during his 10 days with the team.

=== 2011–12 season ===
In July 2011, he signed with Sutor Basket Montegranaro of Italy for the 2011–12 season.

=== 2012–13 season ===
On September 21, 2012, McNeal signed with the Toronto Raptors. However, he was waived by the Raptors on October 22. On November 1, 2012, he was re-acquired by the Vipers. The next day, he was traded to the Bakersfield Jam. On February 4, 2013, McNeal was named to the Prospects All-Star roster for the 2013 NBA D-League All-Star Game.

On March 27, 2013, McNeal signed a 10-day contract with the Utah Jazz. On April 6, 2013, McNeal signed with the Utah Jazz for the rest of the 2012–13 season. He joined the Jazz for the 2013 NBA Summer League. On September 25, 2013, he was waived by the Jazz before appearing in a game for them.

=== 2013–14 season ===
In October 2013, McNeal signed with the Zhejiang Golden Bulls for the 2013–14 season. In December 2013, he was released by the Golden Bulls after 15 games. On February 24, 2014, he was reacquired by the Bakersfield Jam.

=== 2014–15 season ===
On August 4, 2014, McNeal signed a one-year deal with the Spanish team Baloncesto Sevilla. However, he left the team in September 2014 before appearing in a game for them following the death of his father. On January 13, 2015, he was reacquired by the Bakersfield Jam once again and was later named the NBA D-League Impact Player of the Year.

On April 1, 2015, McNeal signed a 10-day contract with the Phoenix Suns. The following day, he made his NBA debut, scoring two points in a 107–106 loss to the Golden State Warriors. On April 11, he signed with the Suns through the 2015–16 season. On July 17, 2015, he was waived by the Suns. Despite this, McNeal continued to play for the Suns at the 2015 Las Vegas Summer League, where he averaged 2.1 points and 1.3 rebounds in seven games.

=== 2015–16 season ===
On July 31, 2015, McNeal signed with Aris Thessaloniki of Greece for the 2015–16 season. In 36 league games for Aris, he averaged 14.1 points, 3.9 rebounds, 2.7 assists and 1.1 steals per game. He also appeared in 16 EuroCup games, averaging 14.4 points, 4.3 rebounds, 2.2 assists and 1.6 steals per game.

=== 2016–17 season ===
On December 21, 2016, McNeal signed a two-month contract with German club Brose Bamberg. On February 23, 2017, he re-signed with Bamberg for the rest of the season.

=== 2017–18 season ===
On August 22, 2017, McNeal signed with French team SIG Strasbourg. However, on September 2, 2017, he parted ways with Strasbourg before appearing in a game for them.

On September 30, 2017, McNeal signed a one-year deal with the Israeli team Hapoel Tel Aviv. On March 10, 2018, McNeal recorded a season-high 25 points along with eight rebounds, four assists and four steals in a 90–87 win over Maccabi Rishon LeZion. In 37 games played for Hapoel, he averaged 13.7 points, 3.3 rebounds, 4 assists and 1.9 steals per game. McNeal helped Hapoel reach the 2018 Israeli League Final Four, where they eventually lost to Maccabi Tel Aviv in the Semifinals.

=== 2018–19 season ===
On November 2, 2018, McNeal returned to Hapoel Tel Aviv for the 2018–19 season. On April 12, 2019, McNeal participated in the 2019 Israeli League All-Star game. McNeal helped Hapoel reach the 2019 Israeli League Playoffs, where they eventually were eliminated by Maccabi Tel Aviv in the Quarterfinals.

=== 2019–20 season ===
On September 6, 2019, McNeal signed a one-year deal with Ironi Nahariya, joining his former head coach Danny Franco and teammate Tony Gaffney. On October 28, 2019, McNeal recorded a season-high 27 points, shooting 9-of-13 from the field, along with eight rebounds and two assists in an 86–84 win over his former team Hapoel Tel Aviv.

== The Basketball Tournament ==
McNeal played for the Golden Eagles in the 2018 edition of The Basketball Tournament. In five games, he averaged 13.4 points, 5 rebounds, and 2.4 steals per game while shooting 53 percent from the field. The Golden Eagles reached the semi-finals before falling to Overseas Elite.

== Career statistics ==
Legend
GP	Games played	GS	Games started	MPG	Minutes per game
FG%	Field goal percentage	3P%	3-point field goal percentage	FT%	Free throw percentage
RPG	Rebounds per game	APG	Assists per game	SPG	Steals per game
BPG	Blocks per game	PPG	Points per game	**Bold**	Career high

=== NBA ===
==== Regular season ====
Year	Team	GP	GS	MPG	FG%	3P%	FT%	RPG	APG	SPG	BPG	PPG
2014–15	Phoenix	6	0	6.1	.273	.500	1.000	.5	.3	.5	.1	1.5
Career		6	0	6.1	.273	.500	1.000	.5	.3	.5	.1	1.5

=== College ===
Year	Team	GP	GS	MPG	FG%	3P%	FT%	RPG	APG	SPG	BPG	PPG
2005–06	Marquette	31	31	27.5	.442	.283	**.750**	4.5	2.7	2.1	.5	11.1
2006–07	Marquette	29	28	30.2	.417	.313	.682	4.8	3.8	**2.6**	**.6**	14.7
2007–08	Marquette	**35**	**35**	30.2	**.456**	.304	.702	**4.9**	3.5	2.2	.4	14.9
2008–09	Marquette	31	31	**33.9**	.452	**.407**	.720	4.6	**3.9**	2.2	**.6**	**20.1**

== See also ==
- 2009 NCAA Men's Basketball All-Americans
