= Lawrence Blackledge =

American basketball player (born 1985)

Personal information
- Born: November 24, 1985 (age 40) Carbondale, Illinois, U.S.
- Listed height: 6 ft 9 in (2.06 m)
- Listed weight: 187 lb (85 kg)

Career information
- High school: Carbondale (Carbondale, Illinois)
- College: Southwestern Illinois College (2004–2006); Marquette (2006–2008)
- NBA draft: 2008: undrafted
- Playing career: 2008–present

Career history

Playing
- 2009–2010: Vancouver BC Titans
- 2010–2011: Osaka Evessa
- 2011: Vancouver BC Titans
- 2011–2012: Osaka Evessa
- 2012: Hamamatsu Higashimikawa Phoenix
- 2012–2015: Iwate Big Bulls
- 2015–2016: Osaka Evessa
- 2016: C.D. Universidad de Concepción Básquetbol
- 2016–2017: Ehime Orange Vikings
- 2017: San-en NeoPhoenix
- 2017–2018: Kyoto Hannaryz
- 2017–2018: Iwate Big Bulls

Coaching
- 2022–2023: Salt Lake City Stars (assistant)

Lawrence Blackledge (born November 24, 1985) is an American professional basketball player. Nicknamed Lawrence "Trend" Blackledge.

== The Basketball Tournament ==
Lawrence Blackledge played for the Golden Eagles in the 2018 edition of The Basketball Tournament. In 5 games, he averaged 3.4 points, 3.4 rebounds, and 1.2 blocks per game. The Golden Eagles reached the semi-finals before falling to Overseas Elite.

== Career statistics ==
Legend
GP	Games played	GS	Games started	MPG	Minutes per game
FG%	Field goal percentage	3P%	3-point field goal percentage	FT%	Free throw percentage
RPG	Rebounds per game	APG	Assists per game	SPG	Steals per game
BPG	Blocks per game	PPG	Points per game	**Bold**	Career high

Year	Team	GP	GS	MPG	FG%	3P%	FT%	RPG	APG	SPG	BPG	PPG
2010–11	Osaka	42	15	24.2	52.4	34.1	53.3	7.7	1.6	1.1	2.2	10.2
2011–12	Osaka	22	22	31.5	40.7	22.2	53.7	10.0	3.2	1.3	3.0	9.4
2011–12	Hamamatsu	28	28	19.8	49.3	22.2	53.8	5.2	1.2	0.9	2.1	9.1
2012–13	Iwate	32	22	27.1	52.5	18.2	51.7	9.2	1.9	0.8	2.6	11.9
2013–14	Iwate	52	50	30.0	48.1	5.9	52.9	7.4	2.8	1.6	2.0	13.9
2014–15	Iwate	52	52	30.9	48.5	22.6	61.8	9.1	3.0	1.5	1.9	14.6
2015–16	Osaka	52	50	31.9	47.5	26.6	60.1	7.2	3.9	1.8	1.9	14.4
2016–17	Ehime	45	3	23.2	41.7	20.0	63.5	5.8	2.2	1.2	1.8	10.8
2017–18	San-en	8	0	10.9	45.5	0.0	80.0	2.9	0.5	0.4	1.2	10.9
2017–18	Kyoto	6	0	6.2	50.0	50.0	57.1	1.0	0.7	0.2	0.2	6.2
2017–18	Iwate	29	1	21.4	39.2	23.6	59.2	5.1	1.7	1.0	1.4	11.3
