= Dwight Buycks =

American basketball player (born 1989)

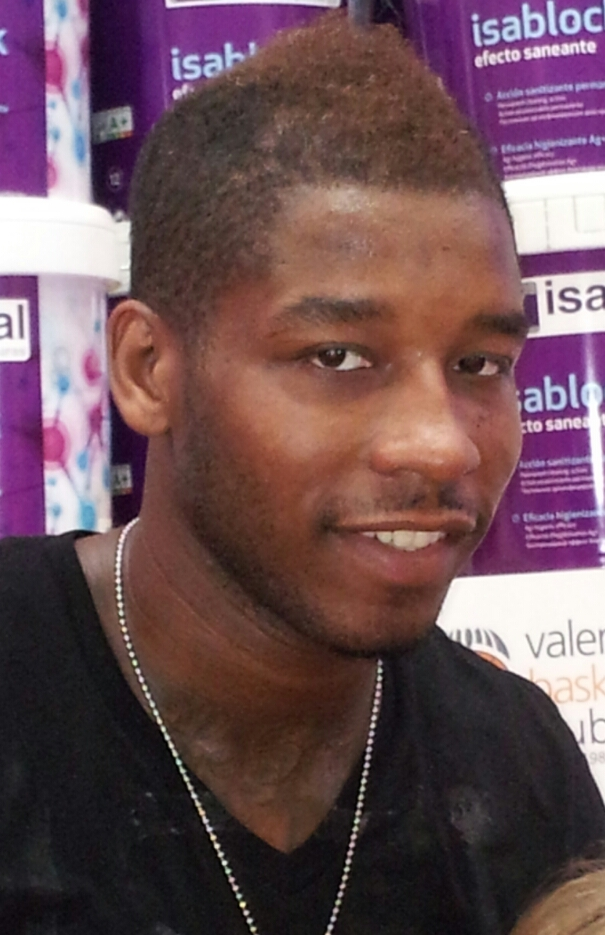
- Buycks in 2014

Free agent
- Position: Point guard / shooting guard

Personal information
- Born: March 6, 1989 (age 37) Milwaukee, Wisconsin, U.S.
- Listed height: 6 ft 3 in (1.91 m)
- Listed weight: 190 lb (86 kg)

Career information
- High school: Bay View (Milwaukee, Wisconsin)
- College: Indian Hills CC (2007–2009); Marquette (2009–2011)
- NBA draft: 2011: undrafted
- Playing career: 2011–present

Career history
- 2011–2012: Tulsa 66ers
- 2012: Oostende
- 2012–2013: BCM Gravelines
- 2013–2014: Toronto Raptors
- 2014: →Bakersfield Jam
- 2014: Valencia
- 2014–2015: Tianjin Ronggang
- 2015: Oklahoma City Blue
- 2015: Los Angeles Lakers
- 2015–2016: Fujian Sturgeons
- 2016: Oklahoma City Blue
- 2016–2017: Fujian Sturgeons
- 2017–2018: Detroit Pistons
- 2017–2018: →Grand Rapids Drive
- 2018–2020: Shenzhen Leopards
- 2020: Olympiacos
- 2020–2021: Nanterre 92
- 2021–2022: Indios de Mayagüez
- 2022–2023: Al-Shamal SC
- 2023–2024: Zob Ahan Isfahan
- 2024–2025: Kalleh Mazandaran

Career highlights
- French Leaders Cup winner (2013); French Pro A Foreign MVP (2013); French Pro A All-Star (2013); Belgian League champion (2012); NBA D-League All-Rookie First Team (2012)
- Stats at NBA.com
- Stats at Basketball Reference

Dwight Buycks (/ˈbaɪks/ BYKES; born March 6, 1989) is an American professional basketball player who last played for Kalleh Mazandaran of the Iranian Basketball Super League. He played college basketball for the Indian Hills Warriors and Marquette Golden Eagles.

== High school career ==
Buycks attended Bay View High School in Milwaukee, Wisconsin. He was a four-year starter on the basketball team and finished his career with 1,312 points. He was the first player in school history to reach 1,000 points. He was named to the All-League Team all four years and the AP and Coaches All-State Team in his senior year. He was voted the top AAU player in the state and led his team to the state championship.

== College career ==
=== Junior college ===
Buycks attended Indian Hills Community College for the 2007–08 and 2008–09 seasons. In his two years, he had 1,254 points, the third most in school history. During his time there, his team was 58–13. They also won a conference tournament championship and made a national tournament appearance. He was on the first team All-Region Team in both his seasons. He was also a First Team NJCAA All-American selection in his sophomore year. His team was ranked in the top five all year and were second in the final poll. They finished sixth in the national tournament.

=== 2009–10 season ===
During the 2009–10 season, Buycks was mainly Marquette's sixth man. During the season, he started 11 games and averaged 24 minutes per game. He averaged 6.3 points per game and 3 rebounds per game while earning his first letter.

=== 2010–11 season ===
In his senior season, Buycks had an increased role, averaging 28.1 minutes per game. In 36 games, he averaged 8.8 points, 3.1 rebounds, 3.4 assists and 1.1 steals per game.

== Professional career ==
=== 2011–12 season ===
Buycks went undrafted in the 2011 NBA draft. In November 2011, he was acquired by the Tulsa 66ers of the NBA Development League (D-League). On December 11, 2011, he signed with the Phoenix Suns. However, he was later waived by the Suns on December 19, 2011. He then returned to the 66ers. In April 2012, following the conclusion of the D-League season, he signed with Oostende of Belgium for the remainder of the 2011–12 Ethias League season.

=== 2012–13 season ===
In July 2012, Buycks joined the Oklahoma City Thunder for the Orlando Summer League and the San Antonio Spurs for the Las Vegas Summer League. In August 2012, he signed with BCM Gravelines of France for the 2012–13 season.

=== 2013–14 season ===
In July 2013, Buycks re-joined the Oklahoma City Thunder for the 2013 Orlando Summer League. On July 16, 2013, he signed a two-year deal with the Toronto Raptors after playing well for them in the Las Vegas Summer League. On January 3, 2014, he was assigned to the Bakersfield Jam. On January 13, 2014, he was recalled by the Raptors. On March 5, 2014, he was reassigned to the Jam. On March 9, 2014, he was recalled by the Raptors.

=== 2014–15 season ===
On July 19, 2014, Buycks was waived by the Toronto Raptors. Six days later, he signed a one-year deal with Valencia Basket of the Liga ACB. On November 7, 2014, he parted ways with Valencia after five Spanish League games and three EuroLeague games. Head coach Velimir Perasović said that Buycks' release was consensual and that Valencia wanted to part ways with him due to bad results. Perasović pointed to himself as the possible reason as to why Buycks did not fit in with the team.

On December 16, 2014, Buycks signed with Tianjin Ronggang for the rest of the 2014–15 CBA season. Following the conclusion of the CBA season, he returned to the United States, and on March 4, he was acquired by the Oklahoma City Blue of the NBA Development League. On April 3, he signed a 10-day contract with the Los Angeles Lakers to help the team deal with numerous injuries. The Lakers had to use an NBA hardship exemption in order to sign him as he made their roster stand at 16, one over the allowed limited of 15. The Lakers parted ways with Buycks on April 13 after he suffered a broken right hand in the team's loss to the Dallas Mavericks the previous night.

=== 2015–16 season ===
In July 2015, Buycks re-joined the Los Angeles Lakers for the 2015 NBA Summer League. On September 24, 2015, he signed with the Fujian Sturgeons for the 2015–16 CBA season, returning to China for a second stint. In 38 games for Fujian, he averaged 25.6 points, 6.4 rebounds, 5.7 assists and 2.2 steals per game.

Following the conclusion of the CBA season, Buycks returned to the United States, where on February 27, he was re-acquired by the Oklahoma City Blue. He made his season debut for the Blue that night in a 90–78 win over the Austin Spurs, recording 14 points, five rebounds, five assists and two steals in 26 minutes.

=== 2016–17 season ===
On August 7, 2016, Buycks re-signed with the Fujian Sturgeons for the 2016–17 CBA season.

=== 2017–18 season ===
In July 2017, Buycks joined the Dallas Mavericks for the Orlando Summer League. He helped lead them to the championship, scoring a team-leading 28 points in their overtime win over the Detroit Pistons.

On September 12, 2017, Buycks signed a two-way contract with the Detroit Pistons. Under the terms of the deal, he will split time between the Pistons and their NBA G League affiliate, the Grand Rapids Drive. Four months later, on January 12, 2018, Buycks' deal would be converted into a full, regular season deal. He averaged 7.4 points and 2.0 assists per game. On July 7, 2018, he was waived by the Pistons.

=== 2018–19 season ===
In November 2018 Buycks signed with the Shenzhen Leopards for the 2018–19 CBA season. He averaged 20.5 points, 4.7 rebounds and 5.3 assists per game.

=== 2019–20 season ===
Buycks signed with Olympiacos on February 16, 2020.

=== 2020–21 season ===
On August 9, 2020, Buycks signed with Nanterre 92 of the LNB Pro A. In four games, he averaged 9.5 points, 1.3 rebounds and 3.3 assists per game. Buycks parted ways with the team on November 9.

=== 2024–25 season ===
On September 15, 2024, Buycks signed with Kalleh Mazandaran of the Iranian Basketball Super League.

== NBA career statistics ==
Legend
GP	Games played	GS	Games started	MPG	Minutes per game
FG%	Field goal percentage	3P%	3-point field goal percentage	FT%	Free throw percentage
RPG	Rebounds per game	APG	Assists per game	SPG	Steals per game
BPG	Blocks per game	PPG	Points per game	**Bold**	Career high

=== Regular season ===
Year	Team	GP	GS	MPG	FG%	3P%	FT%	RPG	APG	SPG	BPG	PPG
2013–14	Toronto	14	0	10.4	.313	.294	.889	1.6	.7	.6	.0	3.1
2014–15	L.A. Lakers	6	0	**20.5**	**.450**	**.636**	**.900**	**2.0**	**2.3**	.5	.0	**8.7**
2017–18	Detroit	**29**	0	14.7	.414	.333	.878	1.4	2.0	**.7**	**.1**	7.4
Career		49	0	14.2	.402	.370	.883	1.6	1.7	.6	.0	6.3

== International ==
Legend
GP	Games played	MPG	Minutes per game	FG%	Field goal percentage
3P%	3-point field goal percentage	FT%	Free throw percentage	RPG	Rebounds per game
APG	Assists per game	SPG	Steals per game	BPG	Blocks per game
PPG	Points per game	**Bold**	Career high		Led the league

Year	Team	League	GP	MPG	FG%	3P%	FT%	RPG	APG	SPG	BPG	PPG
2018–19	Shenzhen Aviators	CBA	39	33.2	.515	.331	.777	4.7	4.9	2.2	.1	20.5
Career		All Leagues	39	33.2	.515	.331	.777	4.7	4.9	2.2	.1	20.5

== Personal life ==
Buycks is the son of Maryann Woods and has a daughter named Sanyha and a son named Draylen.

== See also ==
- Golden Eagles (TBT)
