= Daniel Fitzgerald (basketball) =

American basketball player (born 1984)

Personal information
- Born: August 12, 1984 (age 42) Saint Paul, Minnesota, U.S.
- Listed height: 6 ft 11 in (2.11 m)
- Listed weight: 220 lb (100 kg)

Career information
- High school: Saint Thomas Academy (Mendota Heights, Minnesota)
- College: Tulane (2003–2004); Marquette (2005–2008)
- NBA draft: 2008: undrafted
- Playing career: 2008–present
- Position: Power forward
- Number: 14

Career history
- 2008–2009: Ratiopharm Ulm
- 2009–2010: SAM Massagno Basket
- 2011: Ratiopharm Ulm
- 2011–2012: Sendai 89ers
- 2012: Obras Sanitarias
- 2012–2013: Akita Northern Happinets
- 2013: SAM Massagno
- 2013–2014: Oviedo CB

Daniel John Fitzgerald (born August 12, 1984) is an American former professional basketball player who last played for Oviedo CB.

== College statistics ==
Year	Team	GP	GS	MPG	FG%	3P%	FT%	RPG	APG	SPG	BPG	PPG
2003–04	Tulane	28	3	14.8	.600	.291	.625	1.82	0.96	0.54	0.14	4.18
2005–06	Marquette	31	7	19.9	.479	.394	.724	2.42	1.65	0.65	0.19	5.26
2006–07	Marquette	34	11	21.7	.483	.423	.762	3.88	0.71	0.44	0.12	7.41
2007–08	Marquette	29	4	14.5	.412	.379	.769	2.00	0.34	0.72	0.00	4.38
Career		122	25	17.9	.471	.378	.716	2.59	0.92	0.58	0.11	5.40

== Professional career ==
Fitzgerald started his career with German league club Ratiopharm Ulm.

During the 2012–13 season, he played for the Japanese team Akita Northern Happinets. In the summer of 2013, he returned to SAM Massagno, but he only played one game with them before transferring to Spain in October 2013 to play with Oviedo CB of the LEB Oro.

== Career statistics ==
Legend
GP	Games played	GS	Games started	MPG	Minutes per game
FG%	Field goal percentage	3P%	3-point field goal percentage	FT%	Free throw percentage
RPG	Rebounds per game	APG	Assists per game	SPG	Steals per game
BPG	Blocks per game	PPG	Points per game	**Bold**	Career high

=== NBA Summer League Stats ===
Year	Team	GP	GS	MPG	FG%	3P%	FT%	RPG	APG	SPG	BPG	PPG
2008–09	MIN	3	0	6.6	.333	.000	.000	1.0	0.00	0.33	0.00	0.67

=== Regular season ===
Year	Team	GP	GS	MPG	FG%	3P%	FT%	RPG	APG	SPG	BPG	PPG
2008–09	Ulm	37	2	18.9	.385	.370	.702	2.43	0.65	0.57	0.16	7.95
2009–10	SAM	30		31.6	.478	.410	.827	3.5	1.4	1.5	0.1	14.7
2010–11	Ulm	10	0	15.4	.468	.413	.600	1.00	0.50	0.20	0.00	8.30
2011–12	Sendai	50	48	32.7	.410	.346	.834	6.2	1.4	1.5	0.3	18.9
2012–13	Obras/SAM	14	2	15.8	.443	.440	1.000	2.43	0.50	0.29	0.07	6.93
2012–13	Akita	16		19.2	.226	.187	.838	5.2	1.1	0.6	0.1	7.3
2013–14	Oviedo	14	2	18.1	.487	.442	.773	2.93	0.36	0.57	0.07	8.43

=== Playoffs ===
Year	Team	GP	GS	MPG	FG%	3P%	FT%	RPG	APG	SPG	BPG	PPG
2008–09	Ulm	3		15.7	.167	.000	.800	1.7	0.3	0.0	0.3	2.7
2011–12	Sendai	2		33.5	.250	.308	.750	4.5	1.0	0.5	0.0	8.5

== See also ==
- Golden Eagles (TBT)
