= The Basketball Tournament 2020 squads =

Squads used for the 2020 edition of The Basketball Tournament

This article details the squads that were used for the 2020 edition of The Basketball Tournament.

== Seeds 1–8 ==
These teams received first-round byes, and played their first games in the Round of 16.

=== No. 1 Carmen's Crew ===
Carmen's Crew roster
Players
Coaches

Pos.	No.	Nat.	Name	Ht.	Wt.	Age
PG	4	(United States)	Craft, Aaron	6 ft 2 in (1.88 m)	187 lb (85 kg)	34 – 12 February 1991
PF	11	(United States)	Gibbs, Jeff	6 ft 2 in (1.88 m)	245 lb (111 kg)	44 – 4 August 1980
PG	12	(United States)	McCamey, Demetri	6 ft 3 in (1.91 m)	200 lb (91 kg)	36 – 21 February 1989
C	21	(Senegal)	Dime, Malik	6 ft 9 in (2.06 m)	220 lb (100 kg)	32 – 6 October 1992
PF	22	(United States)	Thomas, Deshaun	6 ft 7 in (2.01 m)	220 lb (100 kg)	33 – 29 August 1991
SG	23	(United States)	Lighty, David	6 ft 5 in (1.96 m)	216 lb (98 kg)	37 – 27 May 1988
SF	32	(United States)	Smith Jr., Lenzelle	6 ft 5 in (1.96 m)	212 lb (96 kg)	33 – 3 October 1991
SG	33	(United States)	Diebler, Jon	6 ft 6 in (1.98 m)	205 lb (93 kg)	36 – 22 June 1988
SG	44	(United States)	Buford, William	6 ft 5 in (1.96 m)	216 lb (98 kg)	35 – 10 January 1990
PF	52	(United States)	Lauderdale, Dallas	6 ft 7 in (2.01 m)	260 lb (120 kg)	36 – 11 September 1988

Head coach

- Jared Sullinger

Legend

- (C) Team captain
- Injured

- Roster
Updated: July 4, 2020

=== No. 2 Overseas Elite ===
Overseas Elite roster
Players
Coaches

Pos.	No.	Nat.	Name	Ht.	Wt.	Age
SF	1	(United States)	Baulkman, Devon	6 ft 6 in (1.98 m)	201 lb (91 kg)	33 – 10 November 1991
PG	2	(United States)	Session, Franklin	6 ft 2 in (1.88 m)	175 lb (79 kg)	36 – 23 January 1989
PG	4	(United States) (Ukraine)	Jeter, Pooh	5 ft 11 in (1.80 m)	175 lb (79 kg)	41 – 2 December 1983
PG	6	(United States)	Brown, Bobby	6 ft 2 in (1.88 m)	175 lb (79 kg)	40 – 24 September 1984
SF	7	(United States)	Johnson, Joe	6 ft 7 in (2.01 m)	240 lb (110 kg)	43 – 29 June 1981
PF	12	(United States)	Kyser, Michale	6 ft 10 in (2.08 m)	220 lb (100 kg)	33 – 26 November 1991
SG	14	(United States)	Tucker, Dakarai	6 ft 5 in (1.96 m)	195 lb (88 kg)	31 – 13 May 1994
PF	24	(United States)	Burrell, Justin	6 ft 9 in (2.06 m)	245 lb (111 kg)	37 – 18 April 1988
PF	33	(United States)	Putney, Raphiael	6 ft 10 in (2.08 m)	185 lb (84 kg)	35 – 21 April 1990
C	34	(United States)	Tatum, Asauhn	7 ft 0 in (2.13 m)	226 lb (103 kg)	34 – 1 February 1991
SG	44	(United States)	Silas, Xavier	6 ft 5 in (1.96 m)	202 lb (92 kg)	37 – 22 January 1988

Head coach

- Marc Hughes

Assistant coach(es)

- Paris Horne

Legend

- (C) Team captain
- Injured

- Roster
Updated: July 11, 2020

=== No. 3 Boeheim's Army ===
Boeheim's Army roster
Players
Coaches

Pos.	No.	Nat.	Name	Ht.	Wt.	Age
SG	2	(United States)	Devendorf, Eric	6 ft 4 in (1.93 m)	180 lb (82 kg)	38 – 21 April 1987
SF	3	(United States)	White, Andrew	6 ft 7 in (2.01 m)	210 lb (95 kg)	31 – 16 June 1993
PG	4	(United States)	Gillon, John	6 ft 0 in (1.83 m)	178 lb (81 kg)	31 – 31 March 1994
SF	8	(United States)	Nichols, Demetris	6 ft 8 in (2.03 m)	211 lb (96 kg)	40 – 4 September 1984
PF	13	(United States)	Greene, Donté	6 ft 9 in (2.06 m)	226 lb (103 kg)	37 – 21 February 1988
SG	20	(United States)	Triche, Brandon	6 ft 5 in (1.96 m)	210 lb (95 kg)	34 – 21 February 1991
SG	22	(United States)	Richardson, Malachi	6 ft 5 in (1.96 m)	205 lb (93 kg)	29 – 5 January 1996
SF	24	(United States)	Rayman, Will	6 ft 9 in (2.06 m)	216 lb (98 kg)	28 – 1 April 1997

Head coach

- Kevin Belbey

Legend

- (C) Team captain
- Injured

- Roster
Updated: July 4, 2020

=== No. 4 Golden Eagles ===
Golden Eagles roster
Players
Coaches

Pos.	No.	Nat.	Name	Ht.	Wt.	Age
SF	0	(United States)	Wilson, Jamil	6 ft 7 in (2.01 m)	229 lb (104 kg)	34 – 21 November 1990
PG	1	(United States)	Johnson-Odom, Darius	6 ft 2 in (1.88 m)	216 lb (98 kg)	35 – 28 September 1989
SG	3	(United States)	Buycks, Dwight	6 ft 3 in (1.91 m)	190 lb (86 kg)	36 – 6 March 1989
PG	4	(United States)	Acker, Maurice	5 ft 9 in (1.75 m)	165 lb (75 kg)	37 – 25 June 1987
SF	5	(United States)	Cook, Elgin	6 ft 5 in (1.96 m)	210 lb (95 kg)	32 – 15 January 1993
SF	11	(United States)	Williams, Jarvis	6 ft 6 in (1.98 m)	215 lb (98 kg)	35 – 10 October 1989
PG	12	(United States)	Wilson, Derrick	6 ft 1 in (1.85 m)	210 lb (95 kg)	33 – 29 January 1992
SF	22	(United States)	Charlo, Mo	6 ft 7 in (2.01 m)	210 lb (95 kg)	41 – 22 July 1983
C	24	(United States) (Armenia)	Fischer, Luke	6 ft 11 in (2.11 m)	259 lb (117 kg)	30 – 29 October 1994
PG	30	(United States)	Rowsey, Andrew	5 ft 11 in (1.80 m)	175 lb (79 kg)	30 – 18 June 1994
SG	34	(United States) (Italy)	Diener, Travis	6 ft 0 in (1.83 m)	174 lb (79 kg)	43 – 1 March 1982

Head coach

- Joe Chapman

Legend

- (C) Team captain
- Injured

- Roster
Updated: July 4, 2020

=== No. 5 Eberlein Drive ===
Eberlein Drive roster
Players
Coaches

Pos.	No.	Nat.	Name	Ht.	Wt.	Age
SG	1	(United States)	Quarterman, Tim	6 ft 6 in (1.98 m)	190 lb (86 kg)	30 – 27 October 1994
SF	2	(United States)	Johnson, Jaron	6 ft 6 in (1.98 m)	205 lb (93 kg)	33 – 5 May 1992
SG	3	(United States)	Hannahs, Dusty	6 ft 3 in (1.91 m)	195 lb (88 kg)	31 – 2 September 1993
PF	14	(United States)	Williams, Emmitt	6 ft 6 in (1.98 m)	230 lb (100 kg)	26 – 15 September 1998
C	21	(United States)	Odiase, Tai	6 ft 9 in (2.06 m)	240 lb (110 kg)	29 – 21 September 1995
SF	22	(United States)	Gates, Kaiser	6 ft 7 in (2.01 m)	225 lb (102 kg)	28 – 8 November 1996
SG	32	(United States)	Thomas, Adonis	6 ft 7 in (2.01 m)	232 lb (105 kg)	32 – 25 March 1993
SG	55	(United States)	Macura, J. P.	6 ft 4 in (1.93 m)	203 lb (92 kg)	29 – 25 June 1995
PG	99	(United States)	Buchanan, Shaq	6 ft 3 in (1.91 m)	190 lb (86 kg)	28 – 30 January 1997

Head coach

- Cody Toppert

Legend

- (C) Team captain
- Injured

- Roster
Updated: July 4, 2020

=== No. 6 Team Challenge ALS ===
Team Challenge ALS roster
Players
Coaches

Pos.	No.	Nat.	Name	Ht.	Wt.	Age
PG	1	(United States)	Bland, Jaylen	6 ft 3 in (1.91 m)	205 lb (93 kg)	32 – 29 March 1993
SG	3	(United States)	Harris, Marvelle	6 ft 4 in (1.93 m)	207 lb (94 kg)	31 – 16 December 1993
PG	4	(United States) (Montenegro)	Rice, Tyrese	6 ft 1 in (1.85 m)	190 lb (86 kg)	38 – 15 May 1987
PF	9	(United States)	Stephens, Deshawn	6 ft 8 in (2.03 m)	225 lb (102 kg)	35 – 9 October 1989
SF	13	(United States)	Branch, Stephaun	6 ft 4 in (1.93 m)	208 lb (94 kg)	29 – 7 November 1995
PF	22	(United States)	Thomas, Malcolm	6 ft 9 in (2.06 m)	225 lb (102 kg)	36 – 8 November 1988
SF	23	(United States)	Marshall, Sean	6 ft 5 in (1.96 m)	210 lb (95 kg)	40 – 11 April 1985
PG	24	(United States) (Georgia (country))	Haynes, MarQuez	6 ft 2 in (1.88 m)	185 lb (84 kg)	38 – 19 December 1986
PF	40	(United States)	Faison, Jordan	6 ft 7 in (2.01 m)	225 lb (102 kg)	30 – 17 October 1994

Head coach

- Sean Marshall

Legend

- (C) Team captain
- Injured

- Roster
Updated: July 4, 2020

=== No. 7 The Money Team ===
The Money Team roster
Players
Coaches

Pos.	No.	Nat.	Name	Ht.	Wt.	Age
PG	0	(United States)	Crawford, Jordon	5 ft 6 in (1.68 m)	150 lb (68 kg)	34 – 17 July 1990
PG	1	(United States)	Wroten, Tony	6 ft 6 in (1.98 m)	205 lb (93 kg)	32 – 13 April 1993
SG	8	(United States)	Ledbetter, Jeff	6 ft 3 in (1.91 m)	195 lb (88 kg)	36 – 15 June 1988
SG	13	(United States)	Johnson, Nick	6 ft 3 in (1.91 m)	200 lb (91 kg)	32 – 22 December 1992
SF	21	(United States)	Darden, Tremmell	6 ft 5 in (1.96 m)	220 lb (100 kg)	43 – 17 November 1981
SG	22	(United States)	Alford, Bryce	6 ft 3 in (1.91 m)	185 lb (84 kg)	30 – 18 January 1995
PF	23	(United States)	Aldridge, Peyton	6 ft 8 in (2.03 m)	225 lb (102 kg)	29 – 10 November 1995
PF	24	(United States)	Wiley, Jacob	6 ft 8 in (2.03 m)	213 lb (97 kg)	30 – 4 September 1994
PF	33	(Canada) (United States)	Wiltjer, Kyle	6 ft 10 in (2.08 m)	240 lb (110 kg)	32 – 20 October 1992
C	35	(United States)	Reed, Willie	6 ft 11 in (2.11 m)	245 lb (111 kg)	35 – 16 May 1990
C	40	(United States)	Welsh, Thomas	7 ft 0 in (2.13 m)	255 lb (116 kg)	29 – 3 February 1996
PF	44	(United States)	Williams, Devin	6 ft 9 in (2.06 m)	285 lb (129 kg)	31 – 31 May 1994

Head coach

- David Nurse

Assistant coach(es)

- T. J. Fredette
- E. J. Gallup
- Jamaal Tatum

Legend

- (C) Team captain
- Injured

- Roster
Updated: July 4, 2020

=== No. 8 Red Scare ===
Red Scare roster
Players
Coaches

Pos.	No.	Nat.	Name	Ht.	Wt.	Age
PF	1	(United States)	Tillman, Justin	6 ft 8 in (2.03 m)	220 lb (100 kg)	29 – 2 February 1996
SG	2	(United States)	Davis, Darrell	6 ft 6 in (1.98 m)	168 lb (76 kg)	29 – 9 May 1996
PG	3	(United States)	Davis, Kyle	6 ft 0 in (1.83 m)	175 lb (79 kg)	30 – 7 January 1995
SG	4	(United States)	Landers, Trey	6 ft 5 in (1.96 m)	221 lb (100 kg)	26 – 20 June 1998
SF	5	(United States)	Oliver, Devin	6 ft 8 in (2.03 m)	224 lb (102 kg)	32 – 2 July 1992
PG	6	(United States)	Lowery, Robert	6 ft 3 in (1.91 m)	173 lb (78 kg)	37 – 23 December 1987
C	21	(United States)	Robinson, Jalen	6 ft 9 in (2.06 m)	243 lb (110 kg)	31 – 25 December 1993
C	24	(United States)	Thompson, Trevor	7 ft 0 in (2.13 m)	250 lb (110 kg)	30 – 12 June 1994
SG	30	(United States)	McMahon, Ryan	6 ft 0 in (1.83 m)	185 lb (84 kg)	28 – 22 September 1996
SF	33	(United States)	Mikesell, Ryan	6 ft 7 in (2.01 m)	217 lb (98 kg)	28 – 29 December 1996

Head coach

- Joey Gruden

Legend

- (C) Team captain
- Injured

- Roster
Updated: July 4, 2020

== Seeds 9–16 ==
These teams were the higher seeds in their round of 24 matches.

=== No. 9 Big X ===
Big X roster
Players
Coaches

Pos.	No.	Nat.	Name	Ht.	Wt.	Age
PG	1	(United States) (Puerto Rico)	Hughes, Trévon	6 ft 0 in (1.83 m)	195 lb (88 kg)	38 – 4 April 1987
SG	2	(United States)	Morris, Jamel	6 ft 4 in (1.93 m)	201 lb (91 kg)	32 – 14 November 1992
PG	3	(United States)	Jackson, C. J.	6 ft 1 in (1.85 m)	175 lb (79 kg)	29 – 9 May 1996
C	20	(United States)	Floyd, Jehyve	6 ft 9 in (2.06 m)	226 lb (103 kg)	27 – 27 June 1997
PF	21	(United States)	Iverson, Khalil	6 ft 5 in (1.96 m)	210 lb (95 kg)	27 – 19 July 1997
SG	22	(United States)	Bess, Javon	6 ft 5 in (1.96 m)	220 lb (100 kg)	29 – 1 April 1996
SG	24	(United States)	Dunham, Kellen	6 ft 4 in (1.93 m)	205 lb (93 kg)	31 – 18 June 1993
SF	32	(United States)	Williams, L. D.	6 ft 5 in (1.96 m)	210 lb (95 kg)	37 – 8 May 1988
PF	33	(United States)	Brown, Vitto	6 ft 8 in (2.03 m)	235 lb (107 kg)	29 – 13 July 1995
C	44	(United States)	Ward, Nick	6 ft 9 in (2.06 m)	245 lb (111 kg)	27 – 2 September 1997
PG	94	(United States)	Dakich, Andrew	6 ft 2 in (1.88 m)	190 lb (86 kg)	31 – 10 May 1994

Head coach

- Andrew Dakich

Legend

- (C) Team captain
- Injured

- Roster
Updated: July 4, 2020

=== No. 10 Peoria All-Stars ===
Peoria All-Stars roster
Players
Coaches

Pos.	No.	Nat.	Name	Ht.	Wt.	Age
PG	1	(United States)	Cowherd, Eljay	5 ft 11 in (1.80 m)	175 lb (79 kg)
PG	2	(United States)	Davis, Kendall	6 ft 2 in (1.88 m)	194 lb (88 kg)
PG	3	(United States)	Allen, Trevon	6 ft 2 in (1.88 m)	190 lb (86 kg)
SG	4	(United States)	Lundy, Luqman	6 ft 3 in (1.91 m)	200 lb (91 kg)	29 – 4 April 1996
SG	5	(United States)	Harris, Jerome	6 ft 5 in (1.96 m)	175 lb (79 kg)	33 – 22 June 1991
PG	6	(United States)	Peary, Ryan	6 ft 0 in (1.83 m)		30 – 24 August 1994
PF	9	(United States)	Charles, Zachary	6 ft 7 in (2.01 m)	209 lb (95 kg)	29 – 17 September 1995
C	12	(England)	Menzies, Aaron	7 ft 3 in (2.21 m)	264 lb (120 kg)	28 – 11 July 1996
PF	12	(South Sudan)	Bar, Koch	6 ft 11 in (2.11 m)	224 lb (102 kg)	28 – 15 September 1996

Head coach

- Willie Williams

Legend

- (C) Team captain
- Injured

- Roster
Updated: July 4, 2020

=== No. 11 Team Hines ===
Team Hines roster
Players
Coaches

Pos.	No.	Nat.	Name	Ht.	Wt.	Age
SG	5	(United States)	Brown, Gilbert	6 ft 5 in (1.96 m)	215 lb (98 kg)	37 – 5 September 1987
PF	6	(United States)	Miles, Isaiah	6 ft 7 in (2.01 m)	220 lb (100 kg)	30 – 9 June 1994
SG	20	(United States) (Philippines)	Gray, Jeremiah	6 ft 4 in (1.93 m)	169 lb (77 kg)	28 – 16 August 1996
SF	21	(United States)	Griffin, Eric	6 ft 9 in (2.06 m)	205 lb (93 kg)	35 – 26 May 1990
PF	22	(United States)	Happ, Ethan	6 ft 10 in (2.08 m)	238 lb (108 kg)	29 – 7 May 1996
PG	23	(United States)	Thornton, Marcus	6 ft 3 in (1.91 m)	190 lb (86 kg)	32 – 9 February 1993
SG	24	(United States)	Paul, Brandon	6 ft 4 in (1.93 m)	200 lb (91 kg)	34 – 30 April 1991
PF	33	(United States)	Peters, Alec	6 ft 8 in (2.03 m)	235 lb (107 kg)	30 – 13 April 1995
PF	42	(United States)	Benimon, Jerrelle	6 ft 9 in (2.06 m)	245 lb (111 kg)	33 – 1 August 1991
SF	44	(United States)	Moore, McKenzie	6 ft 7 in (2.01 m)	190 lb (86 kg)	33 – 11 May 1992

Head coach

- Tyler Hines

Legend

- (C) Team captain
- Injured

- Roster
Updated: July 4, 2020

=== No. 12 Brotherly Love ===
Brotherly Love roster
Players
Coaches

Pos.	No.	Nat.	Name	Ht.	Wt.	Age
SG	1	(United States)	Newbill, D. J.	6 ft 4 in (1.93 m)	210 lb (95 kg)	33 – 22 May 1992
PF	2	(United States)	Ringgold, Michael	6 ft 8 in (2.03 m)		37 – 10 June 1987
PG	3	(United States)	Watson, Maurice	5 ft 10 in (1.78 m)	175 lb (79 kg)	32 – 8 March 1993
PG	5	(United States)	Givens, Shannon	6 ft 0 in (1.83 m)	189 lb (86 kg)
SG	10	(United States)	Moore, Ramone	6 ft 5 in (1.96 m)	190 lb (86 kg)	36 – 27 May 1989
PG	11	(United States)	Wyatt, Khalif	6 ft 4 in (1.93 m)	205 lb (93 kg)	33 – 10 June 1991
SF	13	(United States)	Gadson, Novar	6 ft 7 in (2.01 m)	218 lb (99 kg)	35 – 17 December 1989
PG	15	(United States)	Inge, Semaj	6 ft 6 in (1.98 m)	179 lb (81 kg)	37 – 25 August 1987
C	23	(United States)	Johnson, Marlon	6 ft 10 in (2.08 m)	216 lb (98 kg)	31 – 28 February 1994
C	32	(United States)	Marshall, Wayne	6 ft 10 in (2.08 m)	287 lb (130 kg)	39 – 7 January 1986
PF	45	(United States)	Givens, Samme	6 ft 5 in (1.96 m)	220 lb (100 kg)	35 – 9 August 1989

Head coach

- Kyle Sample

Assistant coach(es)

- Danny Holdsman

Legend

- (C) Team captain
- Injured

- Roster
Updated: July 4, 2020

=== No. 13 Team CP3 ===
Team CP3 roster
Players
Coaches

Pos.	No.	Nat.	Name	Ht.	Wt.	Age
SG	0	(United States)	Harris, C. J.	6 ft 3 in (1.91 m)	189 lb (86 kg)	34 – 19 February 1991
SG	1	(United States)	Miller-McIntyre, Codi	6 ft 3 in (1.91 m)	199 lb (90 kg)	31 – 1 June 1994
PG	2	(United States)	Mason, Nate	6 ft 2 in (1.88 m)	190 lb (86 kg)	29 – 25 July 1995
PG	5	(United States)	Baldwin, Diante	6 ft 0 in (1.83 m)	181 lb (82 kg)	30 – 17 October 1994
SF	6	(United States)	Gladden, B. J.	6 ft 6 in (1.98 m)	209 lb (95 kg)	28 – 17 June 1996
PF	21	(United States)	Dickey, James	6 ft 10 in (2.08 m)	216 lb (98 kg)	28 – 28 November 1996
PG	24	(United States)	Hunt, Sam	6 ft 2 in (1.88 m)	174 lb (79 kg)	30 – 20 February 1995
SF	25	(United States)	Rountree, Aaron	6 ft 8 in (2.03 m)	200 lb (91 kg)	32 – 12 January 1993
C	34	(United States)	Weaver, David	6 ft 10 in (2.08 m)	250 lb (110 kg)	37 – 9 October 1987

Head coach

- Jon Adams

Team manager

- Chris Paul

Legend

- (C) Team captain
- Injured

- Roster
Updated: July 4, 2020

=== No. 14 HEARTFIRE ===
HEARTFIRE roster
Players
Coaches

Pos.	No.	Nat.	Name	Ht.	Wt.	Age
C	1	(United States)	Austin, Isaiah	7 ft 1 in (2.16 m)	225 lb (102 kg)	31 – 25 October 1993
PG	2	(United States)	Lyons, Mark	6 ft 1 in (1.85 m)	200 lb (91 kg)	35 – 4 July 1989
SG	3	(United States)	Adams, Jordan	6 ft 5 in (1.96 m)	209 lb (95 kg)	30 – 8 July 1994
PF	4	(United States)	Doolittle, Kristian	6 ft 7 in (2.01 m)	232 lb (105 kg)	27 – 17 October 1997
PF	15	(United States)	Dawson, Branden	6 ft 7 in (2.01 m)	230 lb (100 kg)	32 – 1 February 1993
PG	29	(United States)	Carter, Tweety	5 ft 11 in (1.80 m)	185 lb (84 kg)	38 – 25 October 1986
SF	30	(United States)	Owens, Larry	6 ft 7 in (2.01 m)	210 lb (95 kg)	42 – 8 January 1983
PG	32	(United States)	Wood, Brandon	6 ft 3 in (1.91 m)	190 lb (86 kg)	36 – 5 January 1989
SG	33	(United States)	Johnson, Dominique	6 ft 4 in (1.93 m)	195 lb (88 kg)	37 – 9 June 1987
C	34	(United States)	McGhee, Gary	6 ft 11 in (2.11 m)	250 lb (110 kg)	36 – 28 October 1988

Head coach

- Billy Kennedy

Legend

- (C) Team captain
- Injured

- Roster
Updated: July 4, 2020

=== No. 15 Armored Athlete ===
Armored Athlete roster
Players
Coaches

Pos.	No.	Nat.	Name	Ht.	Wt.	Age
PG	3	(United States)	Roberson, John	5 ft 11 in (1.80 m)	172 lb (78 kg)	36 – 28 October 1988
SF	4	(United States)	Hicks, Steph	6 ft 6 in (1.98 m)	200 lb (91 kg)	33 – 2 April 1992
PG	6	(Brazil) (United States)	Machado, Scott	6 ft 2 in (1.88 m)	180 lb (82 kg)	34 – 8 June 1990
PF	7	(United States)	Clarke, Coty	6 ft 7 in (2.01 m)	237 lb (108 kg)	32 – 4 July 1992
SG	8	(United States)	Mobley, Matt	6 ft 3 in (1.91 m)	185 lb (84 kg)	30 – 1 September 1994
PF	24	(United States)	Waterman, Zane	6 ft 9 in (2.06 m)	220 lb (100 kg)	29 – 12 October 1995
SF	31	(United States)	Bostic, Josh	6 ft 5 in (1.96 m)	230 lb (100 kg)	38 – 12 May 1987
C	44	(United States)	Gilbeck, Brandon	7 ft 0 in (2.13 m)	235 lb (107 kg)	28 – 9 December 1996

Head coach

- B. J. Dunne

Legend

- (C) Team captain
- Injured

- Roster
Updated: July 4, 2020

=== No. 16 House of 'Paign ===
House of 'Paign roster
Players
Coaches

Pos.	No.	Nat.	Name	Ht.	Wt.	Age
PG	0	(United States) (Puerto Rico)	Vinales, Kyle	6 ft 2 in (1.88 m)	180 lb (82 kg)	32 – 18 June 1992
SF	2	(United States)	Garrett Jr., Billy	6 ft 6 in (1.98 m)	213 lb (97 kg)	30 – 16 October 1994
PG	10	(Dominican Republic)	Feliz, Andrés	6 ft 2 in (1.88 m)	195 lb (88 kg)	27 – 15 July 1997
SF	12	(United States)	Black, Leron	6 ft 7 in (2.01 m)	220 lb (100 kg)	29 – 31 January 1996
SG	21	(United States)	Hill, Malcolm	6 ft 6 in (1.98 m)	220 lb (100 kg)	29 – 26 October 1995
PF	24	(United States)	Daum, Mike	6 ft 9 in (2.06 m)	235 lb (107 kg)	29 – 30 October 1995
C	32	(Nigeria) (United States)	Egwu, Nnanna	6 ft 11 in (2.11 m)	250 lb (110 kg)	32 – 22 October 1992
PF	43	(United States)	Finke, Michael	6 ft 10 in (2.08 m)	235 lb (107 kg)	29 – 26 April 1996

Head coach

- Mike LaTulip

Assistant coach(es)

- Cameron Liss

Legend

- (C) Team captain
- Injured

- Roster
Updated: July 4, 2020

== Seeds 17–24 ==
These teams were the lower seeds in their Round of 24 matchups.

=== No. 17 War Tampa ===
War Tampa roster
Players
Coaches

Pos.	No.	Nat.	Name	Ht.	Wt.	Age
SG	0	(United States)	Brown, Bryce	6 ft 3 in (1.91 m)	198 lb (90 kg)	27 – 24 July 1997
SG	1	(United States)	Magee, Fletcher	6 ft 4 in (1.93 m)	200 lb (91 kg)	28 – 13 November 1996
PF	2	(United States)	Davis, Shaheed	6 ft 9 in (2.06 m)	210 lb (95 kg)	31 – 14 February 1994
SF	3	(United States)	Willett, Shaun	6 ft 4 in (1.93 m)	209 lb (95 kg)	28 – 15 November 1996
SG	5	(United States)	Gray, Justin	6 ft 6 in (1.98 m)	193 lb (88 kg)	41 – 31 March 1984
SG	8	(United States)	Jackson, Brent	6 ft 5 in (1.96 m)	200 lb (91 kg)	31 – 2 March 1994
SF	13	(United States)	Murray, DeSean	6 ft 4 in (1.93 m)	216 lb (98 kg)	29 – 30 January 1996
PG	14	(United States)	Persons, Tayler	6 ft 3 in (1.91 m)	207 lb (94 kg)	29 – 31 August 1995
PF	15	(United States)	Spencer, Horace	6 ft 8 in (2.03 m)	224 lb (102 kg)	31 – 31 January 1994
C	22	(United States)	James, Scottie	6 ft 9 in (2.06 m)	227 lb (103 kg)	28 – 7 November 1996

Head coach

- John Bianchi

Legend

- (C) Team captain
- Injured

- Roster
Updated: July 4, 2020

=== No. 18 Power of the Paw ===
Power of the Paw roster
Players
Coaches

Pos.	No.	Nat.	Name	Ht.	Wt.	Age
PG	1	(Nigeria) (United States)	Akognon, Josh	5 ft 10 in (1.78 m)	185 lb (84 kg)	39 – 10 February 1986
PG	2	(United States)	Reed, Marcquise	6 ft 3 in (1.91 m)	193 lb (88 kg)	30 – 21 April 1995
SG	3	(United States)	Mack, Tevin	6 ft 6 in (1.98 m)	227 lb (103 kg)	28 – 1 May 1997
SG	4	(United States)	Phills, Trey	6 ft 2 in (1.88 m)	185 lb (84 kg)	28 – 25 July 1996
PG	5	(United States)	Hudson, Ty	6 ft 4 in (1.93 m)	200 lb (91 kg)	28 – 1 November 1996
SG	10	(United States)	DeVoe, Gabe	6 ft 3 in (1.91 m)	207 lb (94 kg)	29 – 16 December 1995
SG	13	(United States)	Anderson, Karvel	6 ft 2 in (1.88 m)	190 lb (86 kg)	33 – 3 June 1991
SF	20	(United States)	James, K. J.	6 ft 6 in (1.98 m)	240 lb (110 kg)	29 – 10 October 1995
PF	22	(United States)	Grantham, Donte	6 ft 8 in (2.03 m)	210 lb (95 kg)	30 – 19 March 1995
C	24	(United States)	Thomas, Elijah	6 ft 9 in (2.06 m)	238 lb (108 kg)	28 – 10 October 1996
PF	34	(United States)	Gant, JaKeenan	6 ft 8 in (2.03 m)	216 lb (98 kg)	29 – 6 May 1996

Head coach

- Brian Judski

Legend

- (C) Team captain
- Injured

- Roster
Updated: July 4, 2020

=== No. 19 Men of Mackey ===
Men of Mackey roster
Players
Coaches

Pos.	No.	Nat.	Name	Ht.	Wt.	Age
PG	0	(United States)	Octeus, Jonathan	6 ft 4 in (1.93 m)	169 lb (77 kg)	33 – 23 October 1991
SG	1	(United States)	Gaines, Frank	6 ft 4 in (1.93 m)	194 lb (88 kg)	34 – 10 October 1990
SG	2	(United States)	Stair, Ethan	6 ft 4 in (1.93 m)	205 lb (93 kg)	28 – 6 November 1996
C	3	(United States)	Taylor, Jacquil	6 ft 10 in (2.08 m)	235 lb (107 kg)	30 – 17 May 1995
PG	11	(United States)	Dentmon, Justin	6 ft 0 in (1.83 m)	185 lb (84 kg)	39 – 5 September 1985
PG	14	(United States)	Moore, Ronald	6 ft 0 in (1.83 m)	165 lb (75 kg)	36 – 14 July 1988
PF	22	(United States)	Boudreaux, Evan	6 ft 8 in (2.03 m)	220 lb (100 kg)	28 – 23 January 1997
PF	32	(United States)	West, Lamont	6 ft 8 in (2.03 m)	222 lb (101 kg)	27 – 2 June 1997
C	44	(United States)	Haas, Isaac	7 ft 3 in (2.21 m)	295 lb (134 kg)	29 – 2 October 1995

Head coach

- Ryne Smith

Legend

- (C) Team captain
- Injured

- Roster
Updated: July 4, 2020

=== No. 20 PrimeTime Players ===
PrimeTime Players roster
Players
Coaches

Pos.	No.	Nat.	Name	Ht.	Wt.	Age
PG	2	(United States)	Moore, Chris	6 ft 1 in (1.85 m)	195 lb (88 kg)	39 – 3 May 1986
SG	3	(United States)	Turner, Robert	6 ft 3 in (1.91 m)	180 lb (82 kg)	31 – 4 August 1993
SG	4	(United States)	Lolar, Zeriq	6 ft 3 in (1.91 m)	185 lb (84 kg)	29 – 12 April 1996
SG	5	(United States)	Keeling, Christian	6 ft 3 in (1.91 m)	180 lb (82 kg)	37 – 1 June 1988
SF	6	(United States)	Heath, P. J.	6 ft 6 in (1.98 m)	245 lb (111 kg)
PF	7	(United States)	Britton, Trey	6 ft 8 in (2.03 m)	214 lb (97 kg)	36 – 1 June 1989
SG	8	(United States)	Barnette, Sean	6 ft 5 in (1.96 m)	220 lb (100 kg)	38 – 25 June 1986
PF	9	(United States)	Turner, Odell	6 ft 6 in (1.98 m)
SF	10	(United States)	Wray, Chris	6 ft 8 in (2.03 m)	189 lb (86 kg)	30 – 30 October 1994
C	12	(United States)	Glenn, Ricardo	6 ft 8 in (2.03 m)	246 lb (112 kg)	35 – 1 May 1990

Head coach

- Chris Thomas

Legend

- (C) Team captain
- Injured

- Roster
Updated: July 4, 2020

=== No. 21 Stillwater Stars ===
Stillwater Stars roster
Players
Coaches

Pos.	No.	Nat.	Name	Ht.	Wt.	Age
SG	0	(United States)	Williams, Brian	6 ft 5 in (1.96 m)	209 lb (95 kg)	32 – 20 September 1992
PG	1	(United States)	Tharpe, Naadir	5 ft 11 in (1.80 m)	169 lb (77 kg)	33 – 23 July 1991
SF	2	(United States)	Nash, Le'Bryan	6 ft 8 in (2.03 m)	225 lb (102 kg)	32 – 30 June 1992
SG	3	(United States)	Taylor, Tyshawn	6 ft 3 in (1.91 m)	200 lb (91 kg)	35 – 12 April 1990
SG	4	(United States)	Dziagwa, Thomas	6 ft 4 in (1.93 m)	189 lb (86 kg)	27 – 27 January 1998
C	24	(United States)	Banks, James	6 ft 9 in (2.06 m)	242 lb (110 kg)	27 – 16 January 1998
SG	30	(United States)	Brooks, Armoni	6 ft 4 in (1.93 m)	195 lb (88 kg)	26 – 5 June 1998

Head coach

- Bryndon Manzer

Legend

- (C) Team captain
- Injured

- Roster
Updated: July 4, 2020

=== No. 22 Sideline Cancer ===
Sideline Cancer roster
Players
Coaches

Pos.	No.	Nat.	Name	Ht.	Wt.	Age
SG	1	(United States)	Creek, Maurice	6 ft 5 in (1.96 m)	195 lb (88 kg)	34 – 16 August 1990
SF	2	(United States)	Artis, Jamel	6 ft 7 in (2.01 m)	213 lb (97 kg)	32 – 12 January 1993
PG	3	(United States)	Keene, Marcus	5 ft 9 in (1.75 m)	175 lb (79 kg)	30 – 6 May 1995
SG	4	(United States)	McGlynn, Four	6 ft 2 in (1.88 m)	180 lb (82 kg)	32 – 4 December 1992
C	5	(United States)	Thompson, Eric	6 ft 9 in (2.06 m)	241 lb (109 kg)	32 – 8 April 1993
SG	10	(United States)	Abell, Remy	6 ft 5 in (1.96 m)	201 lb (91 kg)	32 – 17 August 1992
SF	12	(United States)	Johnson, Duane	6 ft 7 in (2.01 m)	190 lb (86 kg)	34 – 2 April 1991
SF	23	(United States)	Wright, Dion	6 ft 7 in (2.01 m)	220 lb (100 kg)	32 – 18 February 1993
C	34	(United States)	Stone, Diamond	7 ft 0 in (2.13 m)	255 lb (116 kg)	28 – 10 February 1997

Head coach

- Charles Parker

Assistant coach(es)

- Jordan Griffith

Legend

- (C) Team captain
- Injured

- Roster
Updated: July 4, 2020

=== No. 23 Herd That ===
Herd That roster
Players
Coaches

Pos.	No.	Nat.	Name	Ht.	Wt.	Age
PG	1	(United States)	Watson, Rondale	6 ft 4 in (1.93 m)	187 lb (85 kg)	29 – 13 March 1996
PG	2	(United States)	Browning, Stevie	6 ft 3 in (1.91 m)	177 lb (80 kg)	31 – 30 November 1993
PG	3	(United States)	diTrapano, Santino	5 ft 10 in (1.78 m)	180 lb (82 kg)
PF	15	(United States)	Cokley, Chris	6 ft 8 in (2.03 m)	229 lb (104 kg)	28 – 27 July 1996
PF	22	(United States)	Williams, JaCorey	6 ft 8 in (2.03 m)	220 lb (100 kg)	30 – 12 June 1994
PF	23	(United States)	Smith, Zach	6 ft 8 in (2.03 m)	216 lb (98 kg)	29 – 5 January 1996
SG	24	(United States)	Elmore, Ot	6 ft 2 in (1.88 m)	196 lb (89 kg)	30 – 1 January 1995
PF	25	(United States)	Taylor, Ryan	6 ft 5 in (1.96 m)	227 lb (103 kg)	32 – 18 June 1992
PF	32	(United States)	Luther, Ryan	6 ft 9 in (2.06 m)	225 lb (102 kg)	29 – 10 September 1995
PG	33	(United States)	Elmore, Jon	6 ft 3 in (1.91 m)	184 lb (83 kg)	28 – 20 December 1996

Head coach

- Gay Elmore

Legend

- (C) Team captain
- Injured

- Roster
Updated: July 4, 2020

=== No. 24 D2 ===
D2 roster
Players
Coaches

Pos.	No.	Nat.	Name	Ht.	Wt.	Age
PG	0	(United States)	Capers, Kevin	6 ft 2 in (1.88 m)	170 lb (77 kg)	32 – 2 May 1993
PG	2	(United States)	Thrower, DeShaun	6 ft 1 in (1.85 m)	205 lb (93 kg)	28 – 10 September 1996
SG	4	(United States)	Davis, Mike	6 ft 4 in (1.93 m)	190 lb (86 kg)	29 – 27 May 1996
PF	10	(United States)	Davis, Wendell	6 ft 6 in (1.98 m)	229 lb (104 kg)	29 – 24 July 1995
SG	11	(United States) (Iraq)	Mayfield, DeMario	6 ft 4 in (1.93 m)	210 lb (95 kg)	34 – 23 May 1991
PF	12	(United States)	Skeens, Brady	6 ft 8 in (2.03 m)	216 lb (98 kg)	29 – 8 August 1995
SF	13	(United States)	Sullivan, Taren	6 ft 6 in (1.98 m)	220 lb (100 kg)	29 – 30 July 1995
SF	21	(United States)	Harper, Brian	6 ft 10 in (2.08 m)	198 lb (90 kg)	39 – 19 July 1985
PG	22	(United States)	Hardin, Jesse	6 ft 2 in (1.88 m)	180 lb (82 kg)	31 – 6 October 1993

Head coach

- Grant Leonard

Legend

- (C) Team captain
- Injured

- Roster
Updated: July 4, 2020
