= The Basketball Tournament 2020 =

Single elimination basketball tournament

The Basketball Tournament
- 2020

Tournament information
- Location: Nationwide Arena; Columbus, Ohio
- Dates: July 4–July 14, 2020
- Tournament format: Single elimination
- Participants: 24
- Purse: Championship: US$1,000,000 winner-take-all

Final positions
- Champions: Golden Eagles
- Runner-up: Sideline Cancer

Tournament statistics
- MVP: Darius Johnson-Odom
- Top scorer: Marcus Keene (86 pts)
- Games played: 22 (plus one walkover)

The Basketball Tournament 2020 was the seventh edition of The Basketball Tournament (TBT), a 5-on-5, single elimination basketball tournament. The tournament, involving 24 teams, started on July 4 and continued through the championship game on July 14, with all games held at Nationwide Arena in Columbus, Ohio. The winner of the final, Golden Eagles, received a $1 million prize.

== Format ==
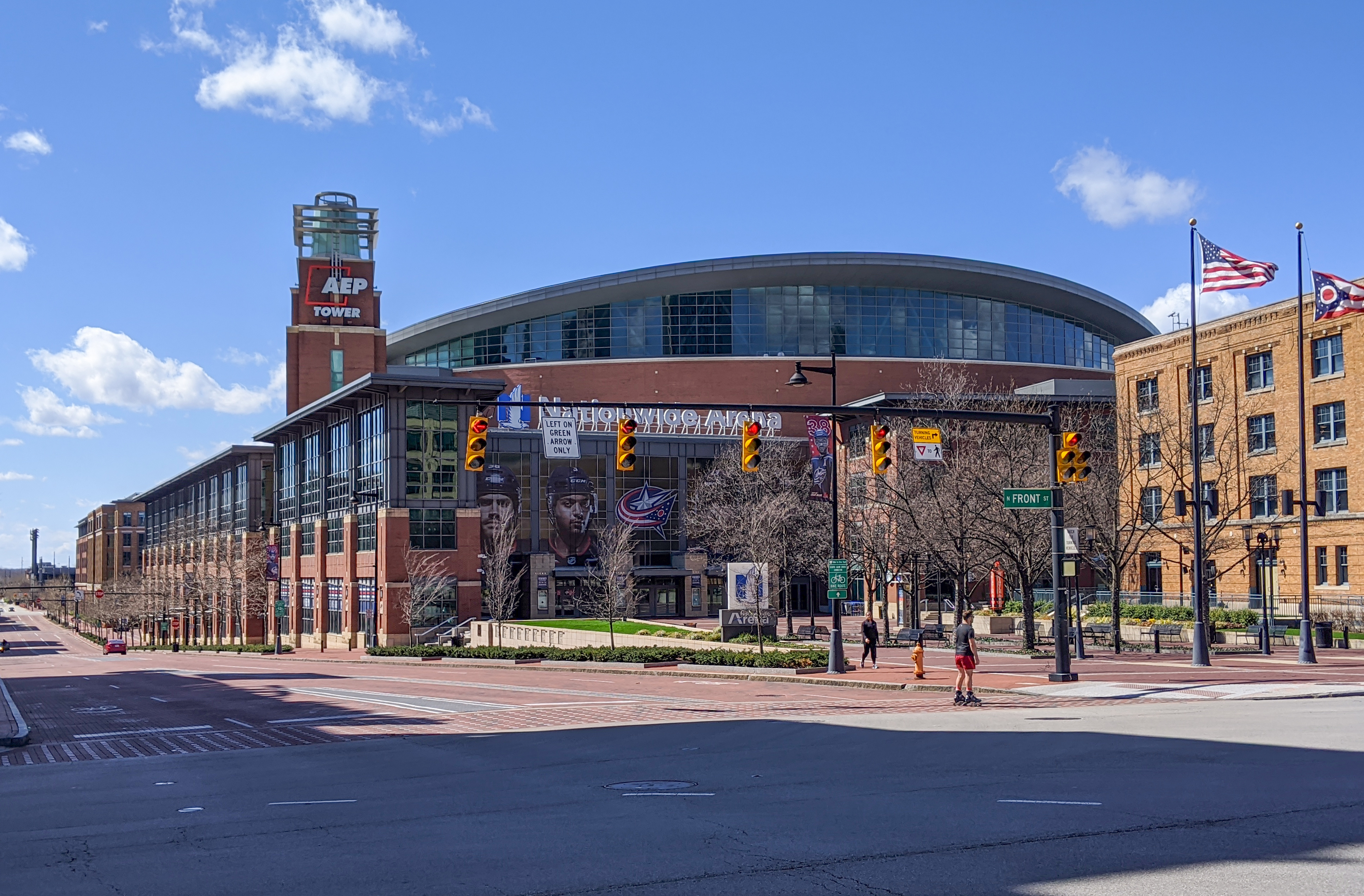
Nationwide Arena, site of TBT 2020

Initial plans for TBT 2020 called for a field of 64 teams, organized into eight regions of 8 teams, all of which would be seeded. Each regional in the 2019 edition was hosted by a competing team, with the winner of each regional received a prize equal to 25% of that region's ticket proceeds, although it was unclear whether this procedure was slated to continue in 2020. The open entry period was set as March 15 to June 15.

Due to the COVID-19 pandemic, it was announced on June 11 that the start of the event would be moved up to July 4 in a modified form, with the entire tournament taking place at Nationwide Arena in Columbus, Ohio, and downsized to 24 teams with a $1,000,000 purse. It marked the first televised basketball event held in the United States since the onset of the pandemic and the suspension of all U.S. professional sports in mid-March, as the NBA did not plan to resume its 2019–20 season until July 31 (with all games hosted by the ESPN Wide World of Sports complex in Orlando, Florida). TBT 2020 organizers put extensive quarantine and testing protocols in place, including the immediate disqualification of any team that had a player test positive. Games were broadcast via ESPN networks (with ESPN having also announced a renewal of its media rights to the tournament), and closed to the public. State governor Mike DeWine considered the event "another step forward in our state's efforts to responsibly restart Ohio".

As with previous years, all tournament games operated with the "Elam Ending", a format of ending the game without the use of a game clock. Under the Elam Ending, the clock is turned off at the first dead-ball whistle with under four minutes to play in the game. At that time, a target score, equal to the score of the leading team plus eight, is set, and the first team to reach this target score is declared the winner of the game. Thus, all games end on a made basket (field goal or free throw) and there is no overtime.

== Teams ==
Multiple teams in the tournament were expected to be comprised mostly or exclusively of alumni of a particular school, program, or a group of closely related schools. As early as October 2019, Florida State had announced plans to enter a team, and St. Bonaventure and Virginia Tech had also announced the same by the end of 2019. In January 2020, Purdue also announced plans to enter a team. By the end of February 2020, Alabama, Illinois, Marshall, Maryland, Oklahoma State, and Virginia had also announced plans to enter TBT 2020. The status of defending champion Carmen's Crew (Ohio State) was initially uncertain; the team did officially enter by early March. Other alumni teams confirmed included Syracuse, West Virginia, and Wichita State. Additionally, Luke Hancock announced that he was exploring entering a Louisville alumni team.

Ultimately, alumni teams from Clemson, Dayton, Illinois, Marquette, Marshall, Ohio State, Oklahoma State, Purdue, Syracuse, and West Virginia were entered, along with teams representing the Big Ten and Mid-American (MAC) conferences. The remaining fifteen teams were not associated with a specific school or conference. The teams representing West Virginia and the MAC would later withdraw, due to each having a player test positive for COVID-19.

The tournament bracket was released on June 16, 2020.

Key: Alumni team representing a specific school

Seed	Team	School/program	Origins of name
1	Carmen's Crew	Ohio State Buckeyes	School song "Carmen Ohio"
2	Overseas Elite		"a collection of stars who play hoops at basketball outposts around the world"
3	Boeheim's Army	Syracuse Orange	Current Syracuse men's basketball head coach Jim Boeheim
4	Golden Eagles	Marquette Golden Eagles	School nickname
5	Eberlein Drive		Street in Fraser, Michigan that co-GM Jacob Hirschmann grew up on
6	Team Challenge ALS		Supporting measures to help in cure of Amyotrophic lateral sclerosis (ALS), also known as Lou Gehrig's disease
7	The Money Team		Nickname of American boxer Floyd Mayweather Jr., who is supporting the team
8	Red Scare	Dayton Flyers	Name given to the Dayton student section at home basketball games
9	Big X		Big Ten Conference, in which most of the team's players played
10	Peoria All-Stars		City of Peoria, Illinois
11	Team Hines		American basketball players Tyler and Kyle Hines, who are the team's head coach and booster, respectively
12	Brotherly Love		City of Philadelphia, known as the "City of Brotherly Love"
13	Team CP3		American basketball player Chris Paul, who is serving as the team's GM
14	HEARTFIRE		Arizona nonprofit HeartFire Missions, a mission trip provider
15	Armored Athlete		
16	House of 'Paign	Illinois Fighting Illini	Champaign, Illinois—the Illinois campus is divided between that city and neighboring Urbana
17	War Tampa		Variation of Auburn's battle cry, "War Eagle" (players are from Auburn and the state of Florida)
18	Power of the Paw	Clemson Tigers	Reference to school's nickname, the Tigers, and main athletic mark, a tiger paw
19	Men of Mackey	Purdue Boilermakers	Mackey Arena, Purdue's home basketball arena
20	PrimeTime Players		
21	Stillwater Stars	Oklahoma State Cowboys	Stillwater, Oklahoma, the location of Oklahoma State University
22	Sideline Cancer		Supporting measures to help in cure of cancer
23	Herd That	Marshall Thundering Herd	Short version of school nickname
24	D2		NCAA Division II, the division in which the schools attended by the players compete

=== Replacements ===
Tournament organizers announced that any team that had a player test positive for COVID-19 would be immediately disqualified and removed from the tournament. Five teams had positive tests; all five were removed before playing in the tournament. Four of the teams were replaced, with the final removal, that of Eberlein Drive, resulting in another team being awarded a walkover.

- On June 22, Best Virginia (No. 10), a team for West Virginia alumni, withdrew after having several players test positive. They were replaced by Playing for Jimmy V, a team in support of the V Foundation.
- On July 1, Jackson TN UnderDawgs (No. 24) were diagnosed with a case and replaced by D2, a team of former NCAA Division II players.
- On July 2, Mid-American Unity (No. 20), had one of their players test positive, although he was asymptomatic. The team withdrew and was replaced by PrimeTime Players.
- On July 3, Playing for Jimmy V (No. 10), themselves a replacement team, had a player test positive and were subsequently disqualified. They were replaced with Peoria All-Stars.
- On July 5, the day before their opening game, Eberlein Drive (No. 5) was disqualified after a player tested positive, despite being asymptomatic. Their Round of 16 opponent, Brotherly Love, advanced automatically to the quarterfinals.

== Schedule ==
Session	Game	Time*	Matchup^{#}	Television	Score
Round of 24
Saturday, July 4	1	3:00 p.m.	No. 9 Big X vs. No. 24 D2	ESPN	79–74
Saturday, July 4	2	5:00 p.m.	No. 12 Brotherly Love vs. No. 21 Stillwater Stars	ESPN	87–71
Saturday, July 4	3	8:00 p.m.	No. 16 House of 'Paign vs. No. 17 War Tampa	ESPN	76–53
Saturday, July 4	4	10:00 p.m.	No. 13 Team CP3 vs. No. 20 PrimeTime Players	ESPN	76–74
Sunday, July 5	5	2:00 p.m.	No. 10 Peoria All-Stars vs. No. 23 Herd That	ESPN	65–80
Sunday, July 5	6	4:00 p.m.	No. 11 Team Hines vs. No. 22 Sideline Cancer	ESPN	91–93
Sunday, July 5	7	7:00 p.m.	No. 14 HEARTFIRE vs. No. 19 Men of Mackey	ESPN2	79–85
Sunday, July 5	8	9:00 p.m.	No. 15 Armored Athlete vs. No. 18 Power of the Paw	ESPN2	98–91
Round of 16
Monday, July 6	9		No. 5 Eberlein Drive vs. No. 12 Brotherly Love	ESPN	w/o
Monday, July 6	10	7:00 p.m.	No. 4 Golden Eagles vs. No. 13 Team CP3	ESPN	76–67
Tuesday, July 7	11	2:00 p.m.	No. 6 Team Challenge ALS vs. No. 22 Sideline Cancer	ESPN	66–76
Tuesday, July 7	12	4:00 p.m.	No. 3 Boeheim's Army vs. No. 19 Men of Mackey	ESPN	76–69
Wednesday, July 8	13	2:00 p.m.	No. 8 Red Scare vs. No. 9 Big X	ESPN	77–68
Wednesday, July 8	14	4:00 p.m.	No. 1 Carmen's Crew vs. No. 16 House of 'Paign	ESPN	68–76
Thursday, July 9	15	2:00 p.m.	No. 7 The Money Team vs. No. 23 Herd That	ESPN	99–102
Thursday, July 9	16	4:00 p.m.	No. 2 Overseas Elite vs. No. 15 Armored Athlete	ESPN	76–70
Quarterfinals
Friday, July 10	17	2:00 p.m.	No. 4 Golden Eagles vs. No. 12 Brotherly Love	ESPN	83–76
Friday, July 10	18	4:00 p.m.	No. 8 Red Scare vs. No. 16 House of 'Paign	ESPN	83–76
Saturday, July 11	19	2:00 p.m.	No. 2 Overseas Elite vs. No. 23 Herd That	ESPN	93–76
Saturday, July 11	20	4:00 p.m.	No. 3 Boeheim's Army vs. No. 22 Sideline Cancer	ESPN	48–65
Semifinals
Sunday, July 12	21	4:00 p.m.	No. 4 Golden Eagles vs. No. 8 Red Scare	ESPN	79–70
Sunday, July 12	22	6:00 p.m.	No. 2 Overseas Elite vs. No. 22 Sideline Cancer	ESPN	65–67
Championship Game
Tuesday, July 14	23	7:00 p.m.	No. 4 Golden Eagles vs. No. 22 Sideline Cancer	ESPN	78–73
*Game times in Eastern Time • #Rankings denote tournament seeding. • Schedule source

== Tournament bracket ==
Round of 24; July 4–5
16	House of 'Paign	76
17	War Tampa	53
9	Big X	79
24	D2	74
13	Team CP3	76
20	PrimeTime Players	74
12	Brotherly Love	87
21	Stillwater Stars	71
14	HEARTFIRE	79
19	Men of Mackey	85
11	Team Hines	91
22	Sideline Cancer	93
10	Peoria All-Stars	65
23	Herd That	80
15	Armored Athlete	98
18	Power of the Paw	91

Round of 16; July 6–9
1	Carmen's Crew	68
16	House of 'Paign	76
8	Red Scare	77
9	Big X	68
4	Golden Eagles	76
13	Team CP3	67
5	Eberlein Drive
12	Brotherly Love	w/o
3	Boeheim's Army	76
19	Men of Mackey	69
6	Team Challenge ALS	66
22	Sideline Cancer	76
7	The Money Team	99
23	Herd That	102
2	Overseas Elite	76
15	Armored Athlete	70

Quarterfinals; July 10–11
16	House of 'Paign	76
8	Red Scare	83
4	Golden Eagles	83
12	Brotherly Love	76
3	Boeheim's Army	48
22	Sideline Cancer	65
23	Herd That	76
2	Overseas Elite	93

Semifinals; July 12
8	Red Scare	70
4	Golden Eagles	79
22	Sideline Cancer	67
2	Overseas Elite	65

Championship; July 14
4	Golden Eagles	78
22	Sideline Cancer	73

== Game summaries ==
=== Round of 24 ===
ESPN

July 4, 2020
3:00 p.m. EDT

Report

No. 9 Big X	79–74	No. 24 D2
Scoring by quarter: 11–23, 19–13, 27–23, 22–15
Pts: Ward 18; Rebs: Iverson 11; Asts: three tied 3		Pts: Capers 25; Rebs: Mayfield 9 Asts: Mayfield 4

Nationwide Arena – Columbus, Ohio
Referees: Alfred Smith, Steve McJunkins, Edwin Young

ESPN

July 4, 2020
5:00 p.m. EDT

Report

No. 12 Brotherly Love	87–71	No. 21 Stillwater Stars
Scoring by quarter: 18–26, 22–11, 28–14, 19–20
Pts: Wyatt 27; Rebs: Watson, Marshall 7 Asts: Givens 3		Pts: Nash 30; Rebs: Taylor 7 Asts: Taylor 5

Nationwide Arena – Columbus, Ohio
Referees: Anthony Eades, Jamahl Ralls, Ryan Sassano

ESPN

July 4, 2020
8:00 p.m. EDT

Report

No. 16 House of 'Paign	76–53	No. 17 War Tampa
Scoring by quarter: 19–14, 20–14, 20–15, 17–10
Pts: Daum 21; Rebs: Daum 13; Asts: Vinales 4		Pts: Murray 13; Rebs: Willett, Spencer 6 Asts: Brown, Magee 2

Nationwide Arena – Columbus, Ohio
Referees: Anthony Eades, Jamahl Ralls, Ryan Sassano

ESPN

July 4, 2020
10:00 p.m. EDT

Report

No. 13 Team CP3	76–74	No. 20 PrimeTime Players
Scoring by quarter: 13–26, 23–20, 16–15, 24–13
Pts: Mason 26; Rebs: Baldwin 9 Asts: three tied 2		Pts: Keeling 25; Rebs: Glenn 13; Asts: Barnette 4

Nationwide Arena – Columbus, Ohio
Referees: Alfred Smith, Steve McJunkins, Edwin Young

ESPN

July 5, 2020
2:00 p.m. EDT

Report

No. 10 Peoria All-Stars	65–80	No. 23 Herd That
Scoring by quarter: 17–25, 15–21, 20–17, 13–17
Pts: Allen 26; Rebs: Cowherd, Allen 8 Asts: Cowherd 9		Pts: Williams 22; Rebs: Williams 9 Asts: J. Elmore 10

Nationwide Arena – Columbus, Ohio
Referees: Anthony Eades, Jamahl Ralls, Ryan Sassano

ESPN

July 5, 2020
4:00 p.m. EDT

Report

No. 11 Team Hines	91–93	No. 22 Sideline Cancer
Scoring by quarter: 24–17, 23–29, 18–14, 16–23
Pts: Paul 23; Rebs: Paul 13; Asts: Brown 4		Pts: Keene 29; Rebs: Thompson 10; Asts: Keene 6

Nationwide Arena – Columbus, Ohio
Referees: Alfred Smith, Steve McJunkins, Edwin Young

ESPN2

July 5, 2020
7:00 p.m. EDT

Report

No. 14 HEARTFIRE	79–85	No. 19 Men of Mackey
Scoring by quarter: 17–21, 25–14, 23–20, 14–30
Pts: Austin 17; Rebs: three tied 6 Asts: Lyons 4		Pts: Dentmon 32; Rebs: Haas 10; Asts: Octeus 5

Nationwide Arena – Columbus, Ohio
Referees: Alfred Smith, Steve McJunkins, Edwin Young

ESPN2

July 5, 2020
9:00 p.m. EDT

Report

No. 15 Armored Athlete	98–91	No. 18 Power of the Paw
Scoring by quarter: 24–14, 29–25, 24–28, 21–24
Pts: Roberson 26; Rebs: Gilbeck 10; Asts: Roberson 5		Pts: Grantham 20; Rebs: Grantham, Thomas 4 Asts: Anderson 7

Nationwide Arena – Columbus, Ohio
Referees: Anthony Eades, Jamahl Ralls, Ryan Sassano

=== Round of 16 ===
ESPN

No. 5 Eberlein Drive	–	No. 12 Brotherly Love
Eberlein Drive had a player test positive for COVID-19 on July 5, thus the team was removed from the tournament.

Nationwide Arena – Columbus, Ohio

ESPN

July 6, 2020
7:00 p.m. EDT

Report

No. 4 Golden Eagles	76–67	No. 13 Team CP3
Scoring by quarter: 24–19, 21–13, 16–17, 15–18
Pts: Johnson-Odom 21; Rebs: Wilson 11; Asts: Buycks 5		Pts: Harris 19; Rebs: Baldwin 7 Asts: Mason, Baldwin 3

Nationwide Arena – Columbus, Ohio
Referees: Alfred Smith, Steve McJunkins, Edwin Young

ESPN

July 7, 2020
2:00 p.m. EDT

Report

No. 6 Team Challenge ALS	66–76	No. 22 Sideline Cancer
Scoring by quarter: 18–14, 22–19, 17–19, 9–24
Pts: Rice 19; Rebs: Thomas 9 Asts: Rice 6		Pts: Abell 17; Rebs: Thompson 13; Asts: Keene 6

Nationwide Arena – Columbus, Ohio
Referees: Alfred Smith, Steve McJunkins, Edwin Young

ESPN

July 7, 2020
4:00 p.m. EDT

Report

No. 3 Boeheim's Army	76–69	No. 19 Men of Mackey
Scoring by quarter: 19–19, 23–13, 16–24, 18–13
Pts: Devendorf 21; Rebs: Greene 9 Asts: Triche, Gillon 2		Pts: Gaines 18; Rebs: Haas 8 Asts: three tied 3

Nationwide Arena – Columbus, Ohio
Referees: Anthony Eades, Jamahl Ralls, Ryan Sassano

ESPN

July 8, 2020
2:00 p.m. EDT

Report

No. 8 Red Scare	77–68	No. 9 Big X
Scoring by quarter: 15–12, 18–26, 22–19, 22–11
Pts: D. Davis 15; Rebs: Oliver 8 Asts: D. Davis, K. Davis 4		Pts: Hughes 20; Rebs: Brown 9 Asts: Bess 3

Nationwide Arena – Columbus, Ohio
Referees: Alfred Smith, Steve McJunkins, Edwin Young

ESPN

July 8, 2020
4:00 p.m. EDT

Report

No. 1 Carmen's Crew	68–76	No. 16 House of 'Paign
Scoring by quarter: 15–19, 29–20, 12–19, 12–18
Pts: Lighty 21; Rebs: Craft 7 Asts: Craft 5		Pts: Daum 23; Rebs: Feliz, Daum 8 Asts: Feliz 5

Nationwide Arena – Columbus, Ohio
Referees: Ryan Sassano, Ray Natili, Tommy Morrissey

ESPN

July 9, 2020
2:00 p.m. EDT

Report

No. 7 The Money Team	99–102	No. 23 Herd That
Scoring by quarter: 40–24, 22–31, 20–19, 17–28
Pts: Alford 20; Rebs: Welsh 10; Asts: Crawford 7		Pts: Cokley 32; Rebs: Cokley 7 Asts: J. Elmore 10

Nationwide Arena – Columbus, Ohio
Referees: Ray Natili, Tommy Morrissey, Jamahl Ralls

ESPN

July 9, 2020
4:00 p.m. EDT

Report

No. 2 Overseas Elite	76–70	No. 15 Armored Athlete
Scoring by quarter: 29–16, 12–20, 20–14, 15–20
Pts: Jeter 22; Rebs: Burrell 6 Asts: Johnson 4		Pts: Clarke 20; Rebs: Clarke 8 Asts: Machado 4

Nationwide Arena – Columbus, Ohio
Referees: Ray Natili, Tommy Morrissey, Jamahl Ralls

=== Quarterfinals ===
ESPN

July 10, 2020
2:00 p.m. EDT

Report

No. 4 Golden Eagles	83–76	No. 12 Brotherly Love
Scoring by quarter: 19–20, 22–20, 24–9, 18–27
Pts: Buycks 19; Rebs: Cook 8 Asts: Buycks 2		Pts: Sh. Givens 22; Rebs: Sh. Givens 13; Asts: Ringgold, Sh. Givens 4

Nationwide Arena – Columbus, Ohio
Referees: Ray Natili, Tommy Morrissey, Ryan Sassano

ESPN

July 10, 2020
4:00 p.m. EDT

Report

No. 8 Red Scare	83–76	No. 16 House of 'Paign
Scoring by quarter: 22–17, 16–15, 20–17, 25–27
Pts: Landers 19; Rebs: Oliver 11; Asts: Oliver 4		Pts: Feliz 17; Rebs: Feliz 14; Asts: Vinales 3

Nationwide Arena – Columbus, Ohio
Referees: Jeff Anderson, Earl Walton, Clarence Armstrong

ESPN

July 11, 2020
2:00 p.m. EDT

Report

No. 2 Overseas Elite	93–76	No. 23 Herd That
Scoring by quarter: 27–17, 20–24, 20–14, 26–21
Pts: Johnson 35; Rebs: Johnson, Tucker 7 Asts: Johnson 5		Pts: J. Elmore 23; Rebs: Williams, Smith 5 Asts: J. Elmore 4

Nationwide Arena – Columbus, Ohio
Referees: Ray Natili, Tommy Morrissey, Jamahl Ralls

ESPN

July 11, 2020
4:00 p.m. EDT

Report

No. 3 Boeheim's Army	48–65	No. 22 Sideline Cancer
Scoring by quarter: 10–10, 14–14, 10–24, 14–17
Pts: Devendorf 14; Rebs: Greene 9 Asts: Gillon 4		Pts: Creek 22; Rebs: Thompson 18; Asts: Artis, Abell 3

Nationwide Arena – Columbus, Ohio
Referees: Jeff Anderson, Earl Walton, Clarence Armstrong

=== Semifinals ===
ESPN

July 12, 2020
4:00 p.m. EDT

Report

No. 4 Golden Eagles	79–70	No. 8 Red Scare
Scoring by quarter: 15–16, 23–18, 23–23, 18–13
Pts: Johnson-Odom 23; Rebs: Wilson 7 Asts: Buycks 4		Pts: Landers 21; Rebs: Landers, Mikesell 6 Asts: D. Davis 4

Nationwide Arena – Columbus, Ohio
Referees: Ray Natili, Tommy Morrissey, Ryan Sassano

ESPN

July 12, 2020
6:00 p.m. EDT

Report

No. 2 Overseas Elite	65–67	No. 22 Sideline Cancer
Scoring by quarter: 19-15, 18-12, 17-20, 11-20
Pts: Johnson 18; Rebs: Tucker 9 Asts: Johnson 3		Pts: Keene 22; Rebs: Thompson 10; Asts: Keene 4

Nationwide Arena – Columbus, Ohio
Referees: Jeff Anderson, Earl Walton, Clarence Armstrong

=== Championship ===
ESPN

July 14, 2020
7:00 p.m. EDT

Stats

No. 4 Golden Eagles	78–73	No. 22 Sideline Cancer
Scoring by quarter: 22–23, 21–21, 17–17, 18–12
Pts: J. Wilson 16; Rebs: J. Wilson, Acker 5 Asts: Buycks 5		Pts: Creek 20; Rebs: Artis 6 Asts: Keene 4

Nationwide Arena – Columbus, Ohio
Referees: Clarence Armstrong, Jeff Anderson, Earl Watson

== Championship game statistics ==
Statistics for the title game are below. The championship basket (reaching the Elam Ending target score) was made by Travis Diener.

Key

No	Uniform number
*	Starting lineup
Pos	Position
	led team in category

Pts	Points scored
Reb	Rebounds
Ast	Assists
Min	Minutes played

Golden Eagles

Coach: Joe Chapman

No.	Pos	Player	Pts	Reb	Ast	Min	College
0*	SF	Jamil Wilson	16	5	0	29	Marquette
1	PG	Darius Johnson-Odom	15	0	3	21	Marquette
3*	SG	Dwight Buycks	15	3	5	26	Marquette
4*	PG	Maurice Acker	6	5	3	18	Marquette
5*	SF	Elgin Cook	15	4	1	29	Oregon
11	SF	Jarvis Williams	2	2	0	10	Minnesota State
12*	PG	Derrick Wilson	1	4	1	14	Marquette
22	SF	Mo Charlo	5	3	1	9	Nevada
24	C	Luke Fischer	0	0	0	4	Marquette
34	SG	Travis Diener	3	1	3	19	Marquette

Inactive: Andrew Rowsey

Sideline Cancer

Coach: Charles Parker
Asst: Jordan Griffith

No.	Pos	Player	Pts	Reb	Ast	Min	College
1*	SG	Maurice Creek	20	4	0	34	George Washington
2*	SF	Jamel Artis	17	6	2	35	Pittsburgh
3*	PG	Marcus Keene	6	5	4	32	Central Michigan
4	SG	Four McGlynn	4	3	1	9	Towson
5*	C	Eric Thompson	7	4	2	30	Pacific
10	SG	Remy Abell	14	3	3	30	Xavier
12	SF	Duane Johnson	0	0	0	2	East Stroudsburg
23*	SF	Dion Wright	5	1	0	10	St. Bonaventure

Inactive: Diamond Stone

== Awards ==
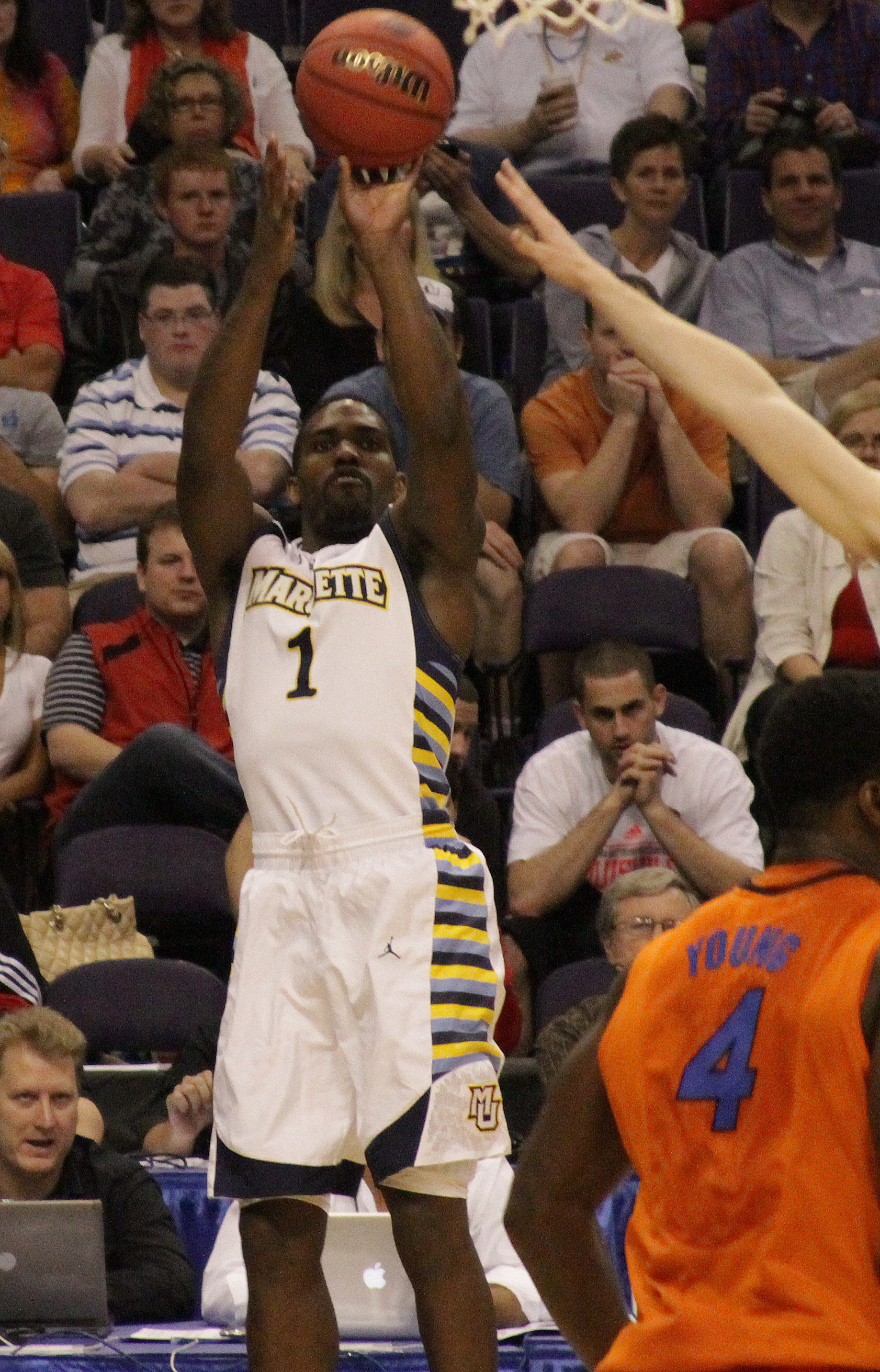
Darius Johnson-Odom, tournament MVP

All Tournament Team
Pos	Player	Team
PG	Darius Johnson-Odom (MVP)	Golden Eagles
SF	Jamil Wilson	Golden Eagles
PG	Marcus Keene	Sideline Cancer
SF	Joe Johnson	Overseas Elite
SG	Trey Landers	Red Scare
GM	Billy Clapper	Sideline Cancer
Coach	Joe Chapman	Golden Eagles
