= David D. Aitken =

American politician (1853–1930)

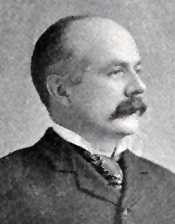

Member of the U.S. House of Representatives from Michigan's 6th district
- In office March 4, 1893 – March 3, 1897
- Preceded by: Byron G. Stout
- Succeeded by: Samuel W. Smith
- Constituency: 6th Congressional District of Michigan

45th Mayor of the City of Flint, Michigan
- In office 1904–1905
- Preceded by: Bruce J. McDonald
- Succeeded by: George E. McKinley

4th City Clerk
- In office 1883–1886
- Preceded by: Albert C. Lyon
- Succeeded by: John H. Hicok
- Constituency: City of Flint

Personal details
- Born: David Demerest Aitken; September 5, 1853 Flint Township, Michigan, U.S.
- Died: May 26, 1930 (aged 76) Flint, Michigan, U.S.
- Resting place: Glenwood Cemetery
- Party: Republican
- Parent: Robert P. Aitken (father)

David Demerest Aitken (September 5, 1853 – May 26, 1930) was an American lawyer, accountant and politician who served two terms as a U.S. representative from the state of Michigan from 1893 to 1897. He also served as mayor of Flint, Michigan.

== Early life ==
Aitken was born on a farm in Flint Township, Michigan in Genesee County. His father, Robert P. Aitken, served in the Michigan House of Representatives from 1865 to 1868. Aitken attended the district schools and the local high school in Flint. He taught in a district school of Genesee County from 1871 to 1872 and moved to New Jersey in 1872, where he was employed as a bookkeeper. He studied law in New York City, was admitted to the bar in 1878, and commenced practice in Flint.

== Career ==
He was Flint city clerk from 1883 to 1886 and city attorney 1886–1890.

=== U.S. House of Representatives ===
Aitken was elected as a Republican to the U.S. House of Representatives from the 6th District of Michigan for the 53rd and 54th Congresses, serving from March 4, 1893, to March 3, 1897. He was chairman of the House Committee on Mines and Mining in the 54th Congress.

He was not a candidate for renomination, running instead for Governor of Michigan in 1896.

=== Later career ===
After losing that election to Hazen S. Pingree, Aitken resumed the practice of law and also engaged in banking. He served as mayor of the City of Flint in 1905 and 1906.

== Death and legacy ==
He died in Flint on May 26, 1930, and is interred in his family's plot at historic Glenwood Cemetery in Flint.

His boyhood home at 1110 N. Linden Rd. in Flint Township, Michigan is listed on The National Register of Historic Places.

== See also ==
- The Robert P. Aitken House, built circa 1843 (David's boyhood home), which is listed on The National Register of Historic Places

U.S. House of Representatives
| Preceded by Byron G. Stout | Member of the United States House of Representatives from Michigan's 6th congressional district 1893–1897 | Succeeded by Samuel W. Smith |
| Preceded by Bruce J. McDonald | Mayor of Flint; 1904–1905 | Succeeded by George E. McKinley |
| Preceded by Albert C. Lyon | Clerk of Flint; 1883–1886 | Succeeded by John H. Hicok |
