= Samuel W. Smith =

American politician (1852–1931)

Samuel William Smith
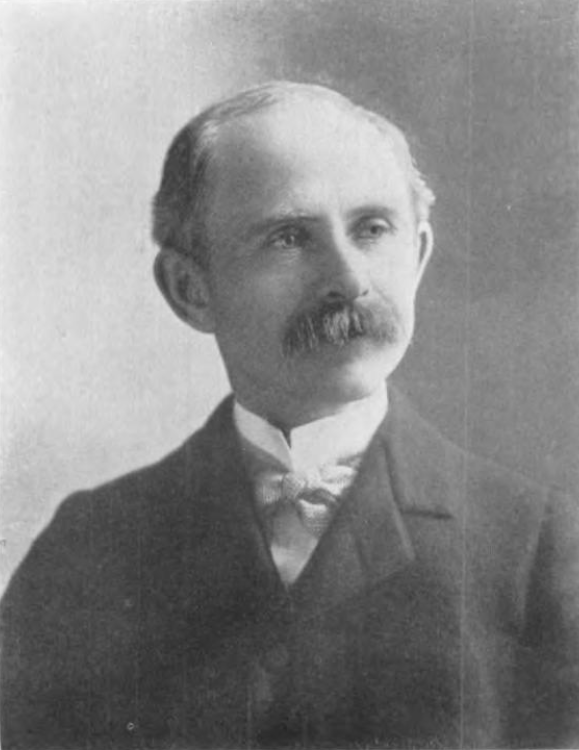

Chair of the Committee on the District of Columbia
- In office March 4, 1907 – March 4, 1911
- Preceded by: Joseph W. Babcock
- Succeeded by: Ben Johnson

Member of the U.S. House of Representatives from Michigan's 6th district
- In office March 4, 1897 – March 3, 1915
- Preceded by: David D. Aitken
- Succeeded by: Patrick H. Kelley

Member of the Michigan Senate
- In office 1885–1887

Personal details
- Born: August 23, 1852 Independence Township, Michigan, U.S.
- Died: June 19, 1931 (aged 78) Detroit, Michigan, U.S.
- Resting place: Oakwood Cemetery
- Party: Republican
- Education: University of Michigan

Samuel William Smith (August 23, 1852 – June 19, 1931), was a politician from the U.S. state of Michigan.

== Early life and education ==
He was born in Independence Township and attended the common schools in Clarkston and Detroit. He began teaching school in 1869, served as superintendent of schools in Waterford Township in 1875 and also served as principal of the school at Waterford, Michigan. He went on to study law, was admitted to the bar in 1877 and graduated from the law department of the University of Michigan at Ann Arbor in 1878.

== Career ==
He began legal practice in Pontiac, where for six months he worked alone with considerable success, and then formed a partnership with Levi Taft and Aaron Perry. Perry retired from the firm during the second year of the partnership, but the connection between Taft and Smith continued until the death of the former in 1897. Smith was prosecuting attorney of Oakland County from 1880 to 1884. He served in the Michigan Senate from 1885 to 1887, representing the 15th District. He was elected as a Republican from Michigan's 6th congressional district to the 55th United States Congress and to the eight succeeding Congresses, serving from March 4, 1897, to March 3, 1915. During his tenure, Smith was chairman of the Committee on the District of Columbia in the 60th and 61st Congresses. He did not stand for reelection to the 64th Congress, but moved to Detroit in 1913 and continued the practice of law.

== Death ==
He died in Detroit and was buried in Oakwood Cemetery in Adrian, Michigan.

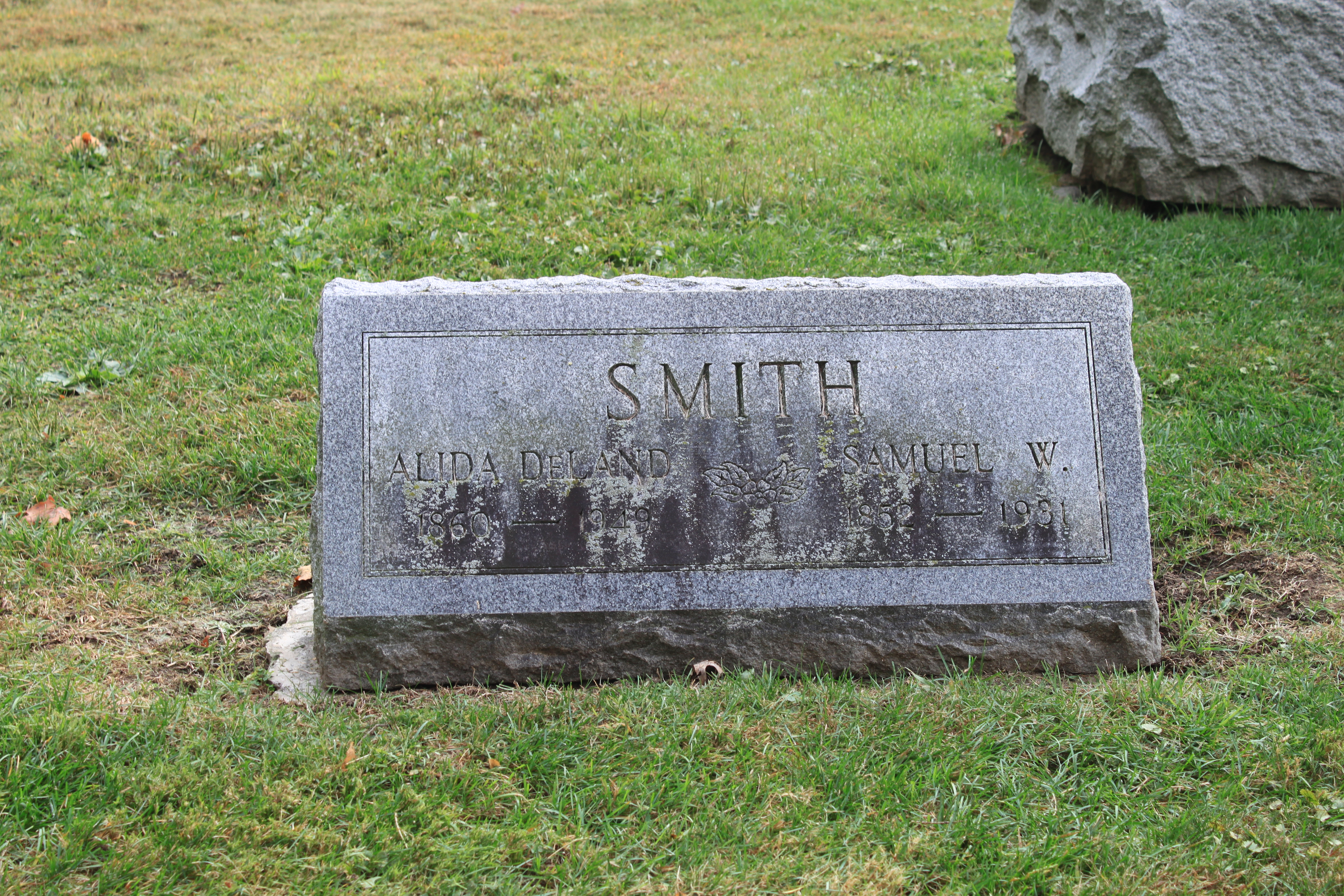
Smith grave

U.S. House of Representatives
Preceded by David D. Aitken	United States Representative for the 6th congressional district of Michigan; 1897 – 1915	Succeeded by Patrick H. Kelley
