= Guy W. Selby =

American politician (1871–1968)

48th Mayor of the City of Flint, Michigan
- In office 1909–1911
- Preceded by: Horace C. Spencer
- Succeeded by: John A. C. Menton

Personal details
- Born: April 1871 Michigan, U.S.
- Died: May 9, 1968 (aged 97) Genesee County, Michigan

Guy W. Selby (April 1871 – May 9, 1968) was a Michigan, United States, politician.

== Political life ==
He was elected as the Mayor of the City of Flint in 1909 for the first of two 1 year terms. defeating the incumbent. In the 1910 election, he defeated former mayor Austin D. Alvord.

== Post-political life ==
In 1916, Selby was president of the Genesee County Bar Association.

Political offices
Preceded by Horace C. Spencer	Mayor of Flint; 1909–1911	Succeeded by John A. C. Menton
