= Robert P. Aitken =

American politician (1819–1905)

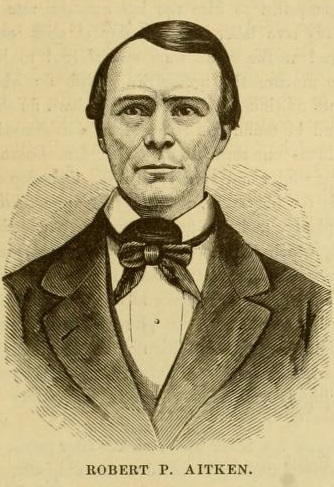

Member of the Michigan House of Representatives from the Genesee County 2 district
- In office January 1, 1865 – 1868

Personal details
- Born: February 5, 1819 Perth, New York, US
- Died: April 3, 1905 (age 86) Flint Township, Michigan, US
- Party: Republican
- Spouse: Sarah Aitken (née Johnstone)
- Relations: Ten children including David D. Aitken
- Parent(s): William Aitken; Helen Aitken (née Chalmers)
- Profession: Farmer, Township Supervisor, Insurance company secretary

Robert P. Aitken (February 5, 1819 – April 3, 1905) was an American politician. He was a member of the Republican Party and served in the Michigan House of Representatives from 1865 to 1868. He was also a township supervisor, a fire insurance company secretary, and a farmer.

== Early life ==
Aitken was born on February 5, 1819, in what is now Perth, New York to William Aitken and Helen Aitken (née Chalmers), both of whom were born in Scotland. He was raised as an Episcopalian and remained a devout follower of this denomination for his entire life. He was the fifth of six children. As a teenager he worked in his uncle William Hinton's office. In 1842, he moved to Flint Township, Michigan.

== Career ==
=== Political ===
In 1865, Aitken was elected to the Michigan House of Representatives for Genesee County's 2nd District, and was re-elected in 1867. He also held the office of Supervisor of Flint Township for twenty nine years.

=== Other ===
He also acted as secretary of the Genesee County Fire Insurance Company.

== Personal life ==
On March 12, 1843, he married Sarah Johnstone. They had ten children, five sons and five daughters. One of their sons was David D. Aitken, also a politician.

== Death ==
Aitken died on April 3, 1905. He is buried in historic Glenwood Cemetery in Flint, next to his wife and children.

== Legacy ==
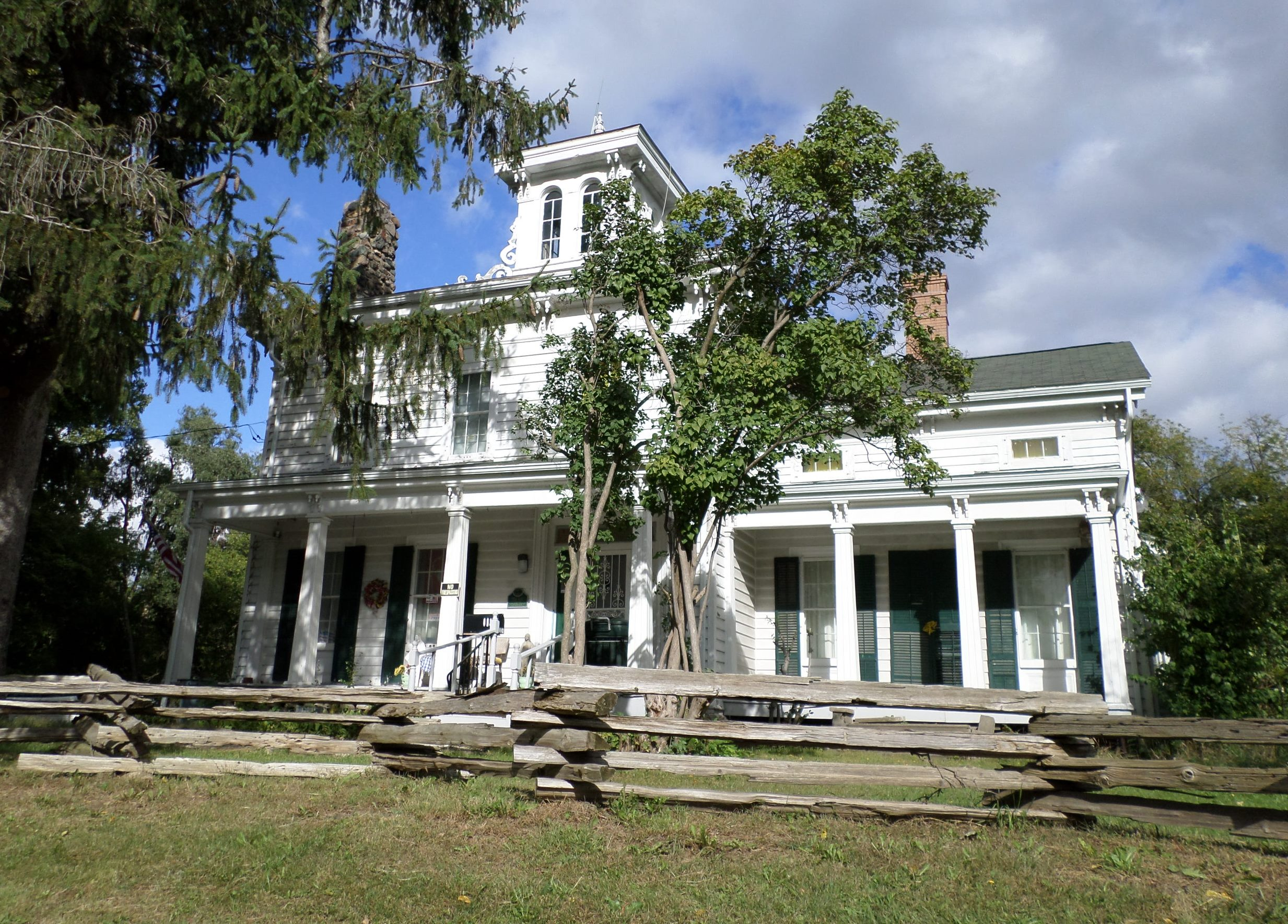
Robert P. Aitken Farm House

Aitken's 1843 Greek Revival/Italianate style farmhouse at 1110 N. Linden Rd. in Flint Township, Michigan was added to The National Register of Historic Places as an example of high-quality 19th century architecture on November 26, 1982. It was later owned by his son David D. Aitken and remains a private residence.
