= George E. McKinley =

American politician

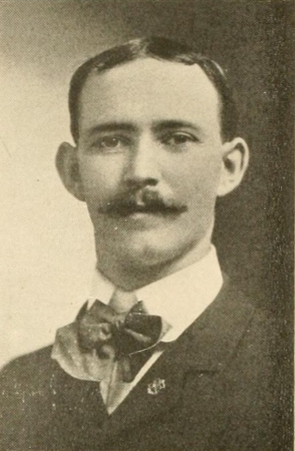

46th Mayor of the City of Flint, Michigan
- In office 1906–1908
- Preceded by: David D. Aitken
- Succeeded by: Horace C. Spencer

Personal details
- Born: c. 1872
- Died: July 25, 1941 (aged 68–69) Genesee County, Michigan
- Party: Democratic

George E. McKinley (c. 1872 – July 25, 1941) was a Michigan politician.

== Political life ==
He was elected as the Mayor of City of Flint in 1906 for the first of two 1 year terms. He ran for reelection in 1908 but lost to Horace C. Spencer, the Republican candidate. In 1916, he ran for 13th District Michigan state senator but lost to Hugh A. Stewart.

Political offices
Preceded by David D. Aitken	Mayor of Flint; 1906–1908	Succeeded by Horace C. Spencer
