= Robert P. Aitken Farm House =

Historic house in Michigan, United States

- Robert Aitken Farm House
- U.S. National Register of Historic Places
- Michigan State Historic Site
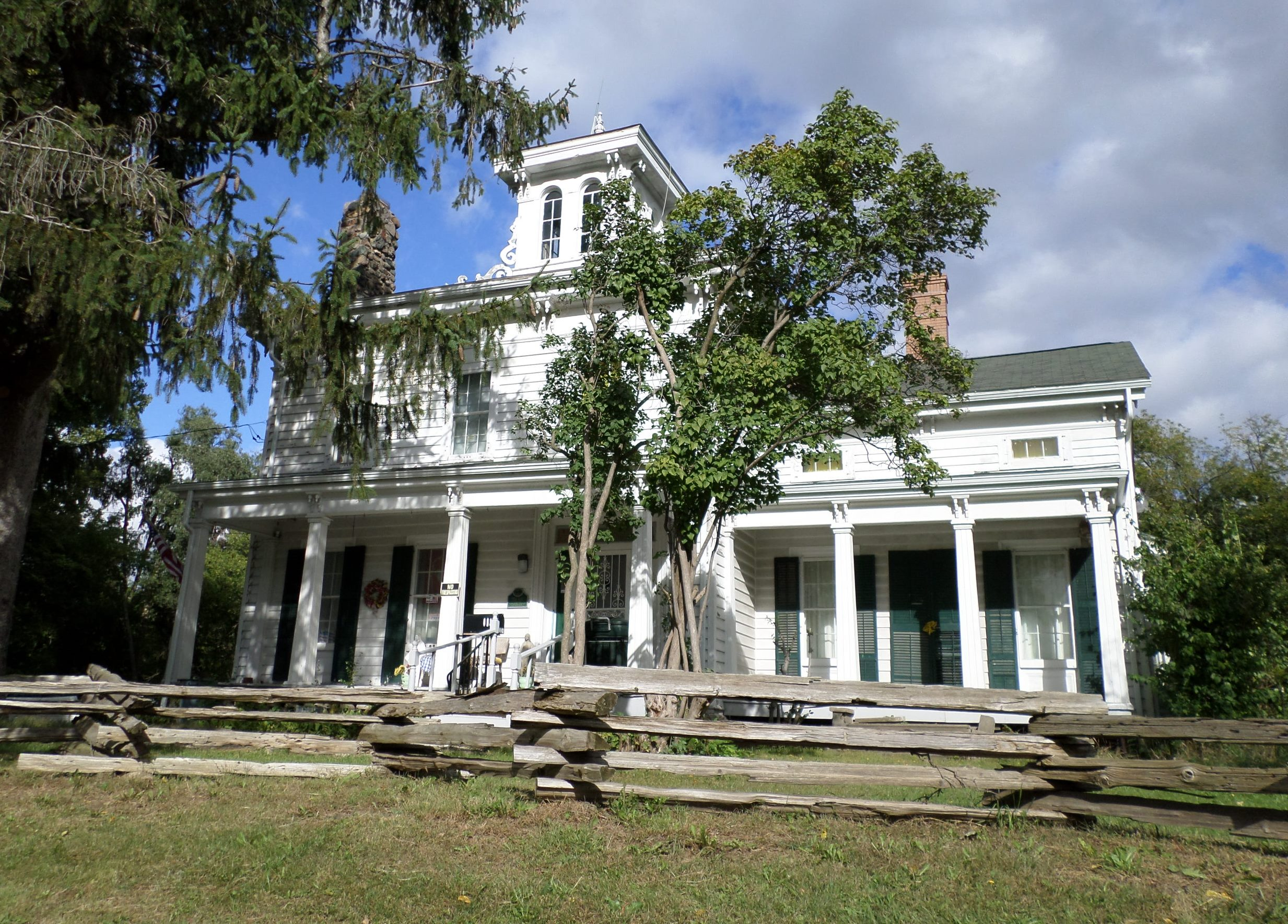
- The house in September 2014

- Location within Michigan Location within the United States
- Interactive map
- Location: 1110 N Linden Rd. Flint Township, Michigan
- Coordinates: 43°1′10.5″N 83°46′21.5″W
- Built by: Robert P. Aitken
- Architectural style: Italianate, Greek Revival
- MPS: Genesee County MRA
- NRHP reference No.: 82000496

Significant dates
- Added to NRHP: November 26, 1982
- Designated MSHS: October 27, 1983

Robert P. Aitken Farm House is an Italianate residence in Flint Township, Michigan, United States. The house was listed on the National Register of Historic Places on November 26, 1982.

== Description ==
The house has several excellent qualities of the Italianate style. The main portion of the house is two stories tall, with paired eavesline brackets, a hip roof, and a cupola. The cupola has delicate scrollwork brackets in the corners, rounded arch windows, and paired brackets under the eaves. The house has two additions with gable roofs and eyebrow windows, indicating Greek Revival architecture, so there is some speculation that those additions were earlier parts of the structure (picture shown to the right.)

== History ==
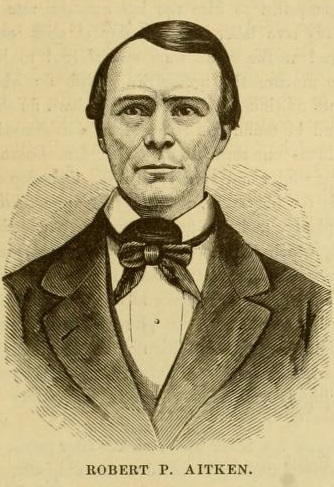
Robert P. Aitken, the home's original owner

Robert P. Aitken moved to Flint Township, Michigan from New York in 1842. He married Sarah Johnstone, also from New York, in 1843. The exact date of construction is not known, but is presumed to be after 1843. Aitken was a successful farmer, and a politician, serving as the supervisor of Flint Township and a representative to the Michigan Legislature. The family had five daughters and five sons. His son David D. Aitken later operated the farm and served in the United States House of Representatives.
