= John A. C. Menton =

American politician

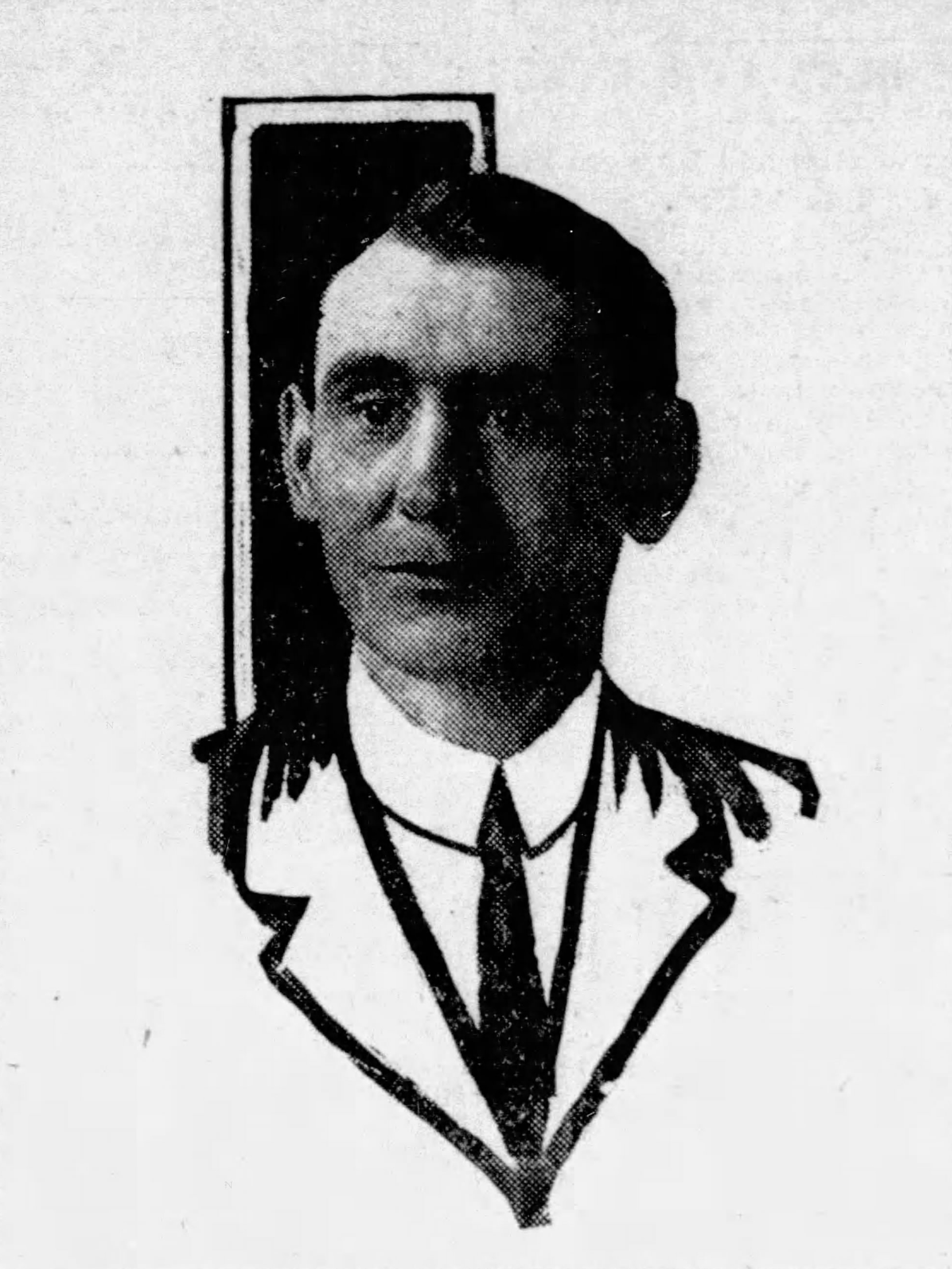
- Menton c. 1911

49th Mayor of Flint, Michigan
- In office 1911–1912
- Preceded by: Guy W. Selby
- Succeeded by: Charles Stewart Mott

Personal details
- Born: September 4, 1866 Saginaw, Michigan
- Died: December 24, 1947 (aged 81) Genesee County, Michigan
- Party: Socialist Party of America

John A. C. Menton (September 4, 1866 – December 24, 1947) was an American politician, the only Socialist mayor of Flint, Michigan (1911–1912). Menton was not only a member of the Socialist Party of America, he was also secretary-treasurer of the Central Labor Council and president of the local Cigar Makers' Union, one of the largest in the city. In 1906 and 1910 he ran unsuccessfully as a Socialist candidate for U.S. Representative from Michigan, 6th District.

Due to a coalition of the Democratic Party, Republican Party, General Motors Corporation and Charles S. Mott in the so-called Independent Citizen's Party, Menton was decisively defeated in the 1912 election, never to serve again.

Political offices
Preceded by Guy W. Selby	Mayor of Flint; 1911–1912	Succeeded by Charles Stewart Mott

== See also ==
- List of elected socialist mayors in the United States
