= Vitto Brown =

American basketball player (born 1995)

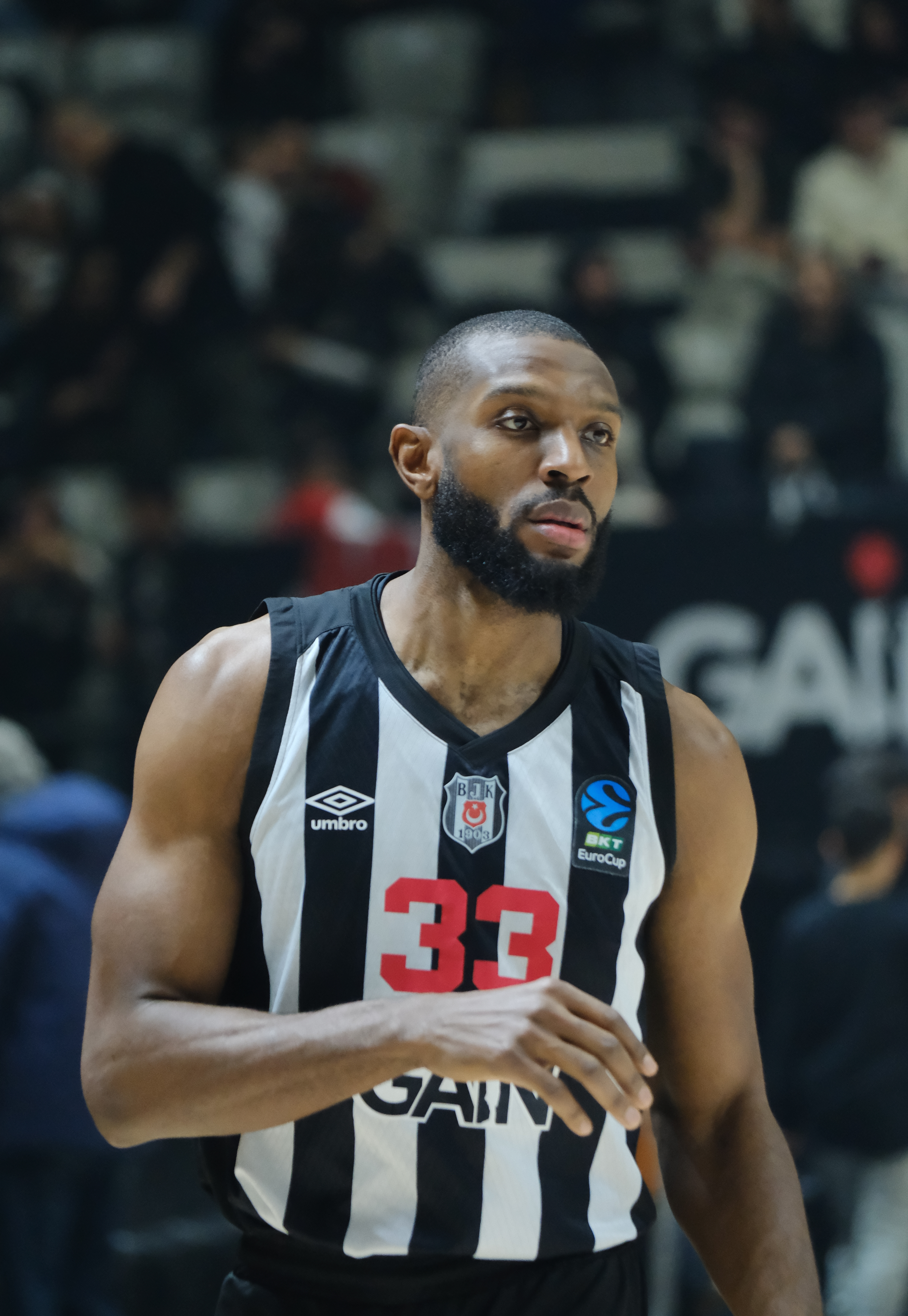
- Brown with Beşiktaş in 2026

San-en NeoPhoenix
- Position: Power forward / small forward
- League: B.League

Personal information
- Born: July 13, 1995 (age 31) Ada, Oklahoma, U.S.
- Listed height: 6 ft 8 in (2.03 m)
- Listed weight: 235 lb (107 kg)

Career information
- High school: Bowling Green (Bowling Green, Ohio)
- College: Wisconsin (2013–2017)
- NBA draft: 2017: undrafted
- Playing career: 2017–present

Career history
- 2017: Wisconsin Herd
- 2017–2018: Agua Caliente Clippers
- 2018–2019: Maine Red Claws
- 2019–2020: Erie BayHawks
- 2020–2021: Le Mans
- 2021–2022: Real Betis
- 2022–2024: Pınar Karşıyaka
- 2024–2025: AS Monaco
- 2025–2026: Beşiktaş
- 2026–present: San-en NeoPhoenix

Vittorio Joseph Brown (born July 13, 1995) is an American professional basketball player for San-en NeoPhoenix of the Japanese B.League. He played college basketball for the Wisconsin Badgers.

== Early life ==
Brown is the son of Sheila and Angelo Brown and grew up in Bowling Green, Ohio. At an early age he developed a passion for singing and performed at weddings and church services. He attended Bowling Green High School where he turned into a highly recruited player despite rarely shooting as a freshman and sophomore.

== College career ==
In his first two seasons at Wisconsin, Brown seldom played. According to coach Greg Gard, he generally entered a game to allow Frank Kaminsky time to grab some water. Early in his junior year, he began displaying flashes of his scoring ability, contributing 16 points in a win against Siena. Brown increased his scoring average to 9.7 points per game as a junior while averaging 5.1 rebounds per game and shooting 40.5% from three-point range. As a senior, Brown averaged 6.8 points and 3.9 rebounds per game for Wisconsin's 2017 Sweet 16 team. He was the school's Outstanding Sportsmanship Award winner and was a two-time Academic All-Big Ten honoree. Over the course of his Wisconsin career, Brown helped the team to 115 wins, equaling the highest four-year win total in school history. He was a nominee for the Allstate Good Works Team in honor of his volunteerism and civic involvement.

== Professional career ==
=== Wisconsin Herd (2017) ===
In November 2017, Brown signed with the Wisconsin Herd of the NBA G League. Explaining why he joined the G-League, he said, “We could have went [sic] to Europe or to Canada but they wouldn’t have gotten as good of competition.” He appeared in five games for the Herd and averaged 7.6 points and 5.2 rebounds in 17.6 minutes per game.

=== Agua Caliente Clippers (2017–2018) ===
On November 29, he signed with the Agua Caliente Clippers.

=== Maine Red Claws (2018–2019) ===
In January 2018 he was acquired by the Maine Red Claws in a trade for Cameron Ayers and JayVaughn Pinkston.

=== Rethymno Cretan Kings (2019) ===
On August 7, 2019, Brown signed his first contract overseas with the Rethymno Cretan Kings of the Greek Basket League, replacing the injured Brandon Taylor. However, he later got injured and was replaced by Ramon Harris on August 19, 2019. He did not feature in a single game for the club.

=== Erie BayHawks (2019–2020) ===
On October 28, Brown was traded to the Erie BayHawks for Codi Miller-McIntyre. On January 10, 2020, Brown had 31 points, nine rebounds and three assists in a win against the Greensboro Swarm. On March 3, Brown posted 24 points, eight rebounds, three steals, two blocks and one assist in a loss to the Long Island Nets. He averaged 15.2 points and 6.5 rebounds per game.

=== Le Mans (2020–2021) ===
On May 25, 2020, Brown signed with Le Mans of the LNB Pro A. On June 12, 2021, Brown scored 27 points, 5 rebounds, and 2 steals in a victory against Nanterre 92. Brown appeared in 32 games for Le Mans and averaged 9.9 points, 3.5 rebounds, and 0.9 assists in 20.8 minutes.

=== Real Betis (2021–2022) ===
On August 21, 2021, Brown signed with Real Betis of the Liga ACB. On November 7, 2021, Brown scored 23 points, 9 rebounds, 3 assists, and 1 steal in a loss to Casademont Zaragoza.

=== Pınar Karşıyaka (2022–2024) ===
On August 11, 2022, he signed with Pınar Karşıyaka of the Basketbol Süper Ligi (BSL) and Basketball Champions League.

=== AS Monaco (2024–2025) ===
On June 27, 2024, Brown signed with AS Monaco of the LNB Pro A and the EuroLeague.

=== Beşiktaş (2025–2026) ===
On July 12, 2025, he signed with Beşiktaş Gain of the Basketbol Süper Ligi (BSL). He spent one season in Istanbul before mutually parting ways with the club in July 2026.

=== San-en NeoPhoenix (2026–present) ===
On July 24, 2026, Brown officially opened a new chapter in his career by signing with San-en NeoPhoenix of the Japanese B.League.

== The Basketball Tournament ==
Brown joined Big X, a team composed primarily of former Big Ten players in The Basketball Tournament 2020. He had three rebounds in a 79–74 win over alternate D2 in the first round.

== Career statistics ==
=== NBA G League ===
Year	Team	GP	GS	MPG	FG%	3P%	FT%	RPG	APG	SPG	BPG	PPG
2017–18	Wisconsin	5	0	17.6	.457	.500	1.000	5.2	.6	.6	.6	7.6
2017–18	A.C. Clippers	19	5	20.1	.374	.279	.783	4.3	.9	.5	.4	7.1
2017–18	Maine	21	2	21.7	.467	.435	.750	4.4	.4	.3	.6	9.3
2018–19	Maine	47	22	25.0	.409	.364	.893	4.7	1.0	.5	.4	10.4
Career		92	29	22.8	.417	.367	.845	4.6	.8	.4	.4	9.3
