= Devon Baulkman =

American basketball player (born 1991)

Free agent
- Position: Shooting guard

Personal information
- Born: November 10, 1991 (age 35) Bainbridge, Georgia, U.S.
- Listed height: 6 ft 4 in (1.93 m)
- Listed weight: 201 lb (91 kg)

Career information
- High school: Bainbridge (Bainbridge, Georgia)
- College: Gulf Coast State College (2012–2014); Tennessee (2014–2016)
- NBA draft: 2016: undrafted
- Playing career: 2016–present

Career history
- 2016: OrangeAcademy
- 2017–2019: Westchester Knicks
- 2019–2020: Grand Rapids Drive
- 2021–2022: Motor City Cruise

Devon Jemel Baulkman (born November 10, 1991) is an American professional basketball player who last played for the Motor City Cruise of the NBA G League. He played college basketball for the Tennessee Volunteers.

== High school career ==
Baulkman played high school basketball for Bainbridge High School in Bainbridge, Georgia.

== College career ==
Baulkman played his first two years of eligibility at Gulf Coast State College in Panama City, Florida. He set the school record for most points scored in a single game with 48. On May 12, 2014, Baulkman signed paperwork to play for the Tennessee Volunteers. Baulkman averaged 7.2 points, 2.9 rebounds, and 1.2 assists per game for the Tennessee Volunteers.

== Professional career ==
=== Orange Academy (2016) ===
After not being selected in the 2016 NBA draft, Baulkman signed a deal with ratiopharm Ulm of the German Basketball Bundesliga, but ended up playing for the ProB affiliate, OrangeAcademy, where he played eight games and averaged 17.1 points and 6.4 rebounds.

=== Westchester Knicks (2017–2019) ===
On October 23, 2017, Baulkman was acquired by the New York Knicks G League affiliate team, the Westchester Knicks via team tryout. On March 19, 2019, he was waived.

=== Grand Rapids Drive (2019–2020) ===
Baulkman joined the Grand Rapids Drive for the 2019–20 season.

=== Motor City Cruise (2021–2022) ===
In 2021, Baulkman was selected in the third round of the NBA G League draft by the Motor City Cruise. On November 12, 2022, Baulkman was reacquired by the Motor City Cruise.

== Career statistics ==
Legend
GP	Games played	GS	Games started	MPG	Minutes per game
FG%	Field goal percentage	3P%	3-point field goal percentage	FT%	Free throw percentage
RPG	Rebounds per game	APG	Assists per game	SPG	Steals per game
BPG	Blocks per game	PPG	Points per game	**Bold**	Career high

=== College ===
Year	Team	GP	GS	MPG	FG%	3P%	FT%	RPG	APG	SPG	BPG	PPG
2014–15	Tennessee	31	7	14.7	**.381**	**.382**	.795	2.3	.6	.6	.1	4.7
2015–16	Tennessee	**34**	**32**	**27.4**	.373	.333	**.815**	**3.4**	**1.8**	**1.0**	**.4**	**9.5**
Career		65	39	21.4	.376	.346	.806	2.9	1.2	.8	.2	7.2

=== NBA G League ===
Year	Team	GP	GS	MPG	FG%	3P%	FT%	RPG	APG	SPG	BPG	PPG
2017–18	Westchester	32	3	16.2	.370	**.373**	**.811**	2.6	.7	**1.1**	.3	5.4
2018–19	Westchester	**39**	**7**	**20.5**	**.411**	.358	.750	**3.0**	**1.1**	.7	**.5**	**7.6**
2019–20	Grand Rapids	36	4	13.6	.317	.291	.632	1.5	.8	.4	.2	5.5
2021–22	Motor City	9	5	18.0	.318	.269	.714	1.7	.9	.6	.1	4.6
Career		116	19	17.0	.367	.327	.747	2.3	.9	.7	.3	6.1
