= JaCorey Williams =

American basketball player (born 1994)

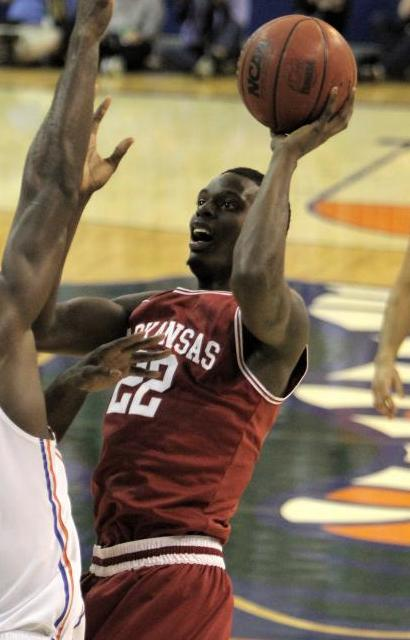
- Williams with Arkansas in college

No. 22 – New Basket Brindisi
- Position: Power forward / center
- League: Serie A2

Personal information
- Born: June 12, 1994 (age 32) Birmingham, Alabama, U.S.
- Listed height: 6 ft 8 in (2.03 m)
- Listed weight: 225 lb (102 kg)

Career information
- High school: Central Park Christian (Birmingham, Alabama)
- College: Arkansas (2012–2015); Middle Tennessee (2016–2017)
- NBA draft: 2017: undrafted
- Playing career: 2017–present

Career history
- 2017–2018: Canton Charge
- 2018: Hapoel Gilboa Galil
- 2018–2019: Canton Charge
- 2019–2020: Ulsan Mobis Phoebus
- 2020: PAOK
- 2020–2021: Trento
- 2021–2022: Bourg
- 2022–2023: Napoli
- 2023–2024: Budućnost
- 2024: Hapoel Jerusalem
- 2024–2025: Dubai Basketball
- 2025–2026: Maroussi
- 2026–present: New Basket Brindisi

Career highlights
- All-Lega Serie A Team (2023); Lega Serie Top Scorer (2021); AP Honorable Mention All-American (2017); Conference USA Player of the Year (2017); First-team All-Conference USA (2017)
- Stats at Basketball Reference

JaCorey Williams (born June 12, 1994) is an American professional basketball player for New Basket Brindisi of the Italian Serie A2. He played college basketball at Middle Tennessee State University, where he was named the Conference USA Player of the Year in 2017.

== College career ==
A 6' 8" power forward, Williams, came from Central Park Christian High School in his hometown of Birmingham, Alabama, and originally attended the University of Arkansas. He played three seasons for the Razorbacks, averaging 4.8 points per game in three seasons for the team. In the summer of 2015 he was dismissed from the team after multiple incidents in the offseason.

Williams transferred to Middle Tennessee for his last season of eligibility, where he averaged 17.3 points and 7.3 rebounds per game for the Conference USA champion Blue Raiders, leading the team to the 2017 NCAA Tournament. They upset Minnesota from the Big Ten Conference before falling to Butler. At the close of the season, Williams was named the Conference player of the Year.

== Professional career ==
=== Canton Charge (2017–2018) ===
Williams signed an agreement on June 23, 2017, to play in the NBA Summer League with the defending NBA champions Golden State Warriors. He then signed to join the Cleveland Cavaliers roster for training camp on September 26, 2017. He was waived the next day so that Cleveland could sign new free agent Dwyane Wade. On November 2, 2017, Williams joined the Canton Charge, the Cavaliers' NBA G League team. In 49 games for the Charge, he averaged 15.4 points and 7.5 rebounds per game.

=== Hapoel Gilboa Galil (2018) ===
On March 22, 2018, Williams signed with the Israeli team Hapoel Gilboa Galil for the rest of the season. On April 21, 2018, Williams recorded a double-double and season-high of 18 points and 11 rebounds, shooting 8-of-15 from the field, along with two steals in a 78–76 win over Maccabi Rishon LeZion. Williams helped Gilboa Galil reach the 2018 Israeli League Playoffs, where they eventually were eliminated by Hapoel Jerusalem.

=== Return to the Charge (2018–2019) ===
On September 16, 2018, the Cleveland Cavaliers signed Williams to a training camp contract, but was waived by the Cavaliers four days later. He then rejoined the Cavaliers’ G League affiliate, the Canton Charge. In 50 games played for the Charge, he averaged 15.2 points, 7 rebounds and 2.3 assists per game.

=== Ulsan Mobis Phoebus (2019–2020) ===
On July 27, 2019, Williams signed with Ulsan Mobis Phoebus of the Korean Basketball League.

=== PAOK Thessaloniki (2020) ===
On January 23, 2020, Williams signed with Greek club PAOK, along with M. J. Rhett. He averaged 8.3 points and 6.7 rebounds per game in six games.

=== Aquila Basket Trento (2020–2021) ===
On August 1, 2020, Williams signed for Aquila Basket Trento of the Italian Lega Basket Serie A (LBA) and EuroCup Basketball.

=== JL Bourg (2021–2022) ===
On July 20, 2021, Williams signed for JL Bourg of the French LNB Pro A. JL Bourg also plays in the EuroCup.

=== Napoli Basket (2022–2023) ===
On July 5, 2022, he has signed with Napoli Basket of the Italian Lega Basket Serie A (LBA).

=== Budućnost VOLI (2023–2024) ===
On July 20, 2023, he signed with Budućnost VOLI of the Prva A Liga.

=== Hapoel Jerusalem (2024) ===
On January 15, 2024, he signed with Hapoel Jerusalem of the Israeli Basketball Premier League.

=== Dubai Basketball (2024–2025) ===
On August 5, 2024, Williams signed with Dubai Basketball of the ABA League.

=== Maroussi (2025–present) ===
On July 3, 2025, Williams signed with Maroussi, returning to the Greek Basketball League.

== The Basketball Tournament ==
Williams joined Herd That, a team composed primarily of Marshall alumni, in The Basketball Tournament 2020. He scored 30 points in a 102–99 come-from-behind win over the Money Team in the second round.

== Career statistics ==
Legend
GP	Games played	GS	Games started	MPG	Minutes per game
FG%	Field goal percentage	3P%	3-point field goal percentage	FT%	Free throw percentage
RPG	Rebounds per game	APG	Assists per game	SPG	Steals per game
BPG	Blocks per game	PPG	Points per game	**Bold**	Career high

=== College ===
Year	Team	GP	GS	MPG	FG%	3P%	FT%	RPG	APG	SPG	BPG	PPG
2012–13	Arkansas	30	0	9.3	.444	.211	**.773**	1.9	.5	.3	.3	3.4
2013–14	Arkansas	30	0	9.2	.398	**.333**	.684	2.1	.5	.3	.2	3.2
2014–15	Arkansas	**36**	7	16.2	.408	-	.424	2.8	1.1	.7	.4	4.8
2015–16	Middle Tennessee	Redshirt										
2016–17	Middle Tennessee	**36**	**36**	**29.7**	**.533**	.133	.696	**7.3**	**1.6**	**.9**	**.5**	**17.3**
Career		132	43	16.7	.481	.189	.637	3.7	1.0	.6	.4	7.5
