= Glenwood Cemetery (Flint, Michigan) =

Cemetery in Michigan

- U.S. National Register of Historic Places
- Michigan State Historic Site
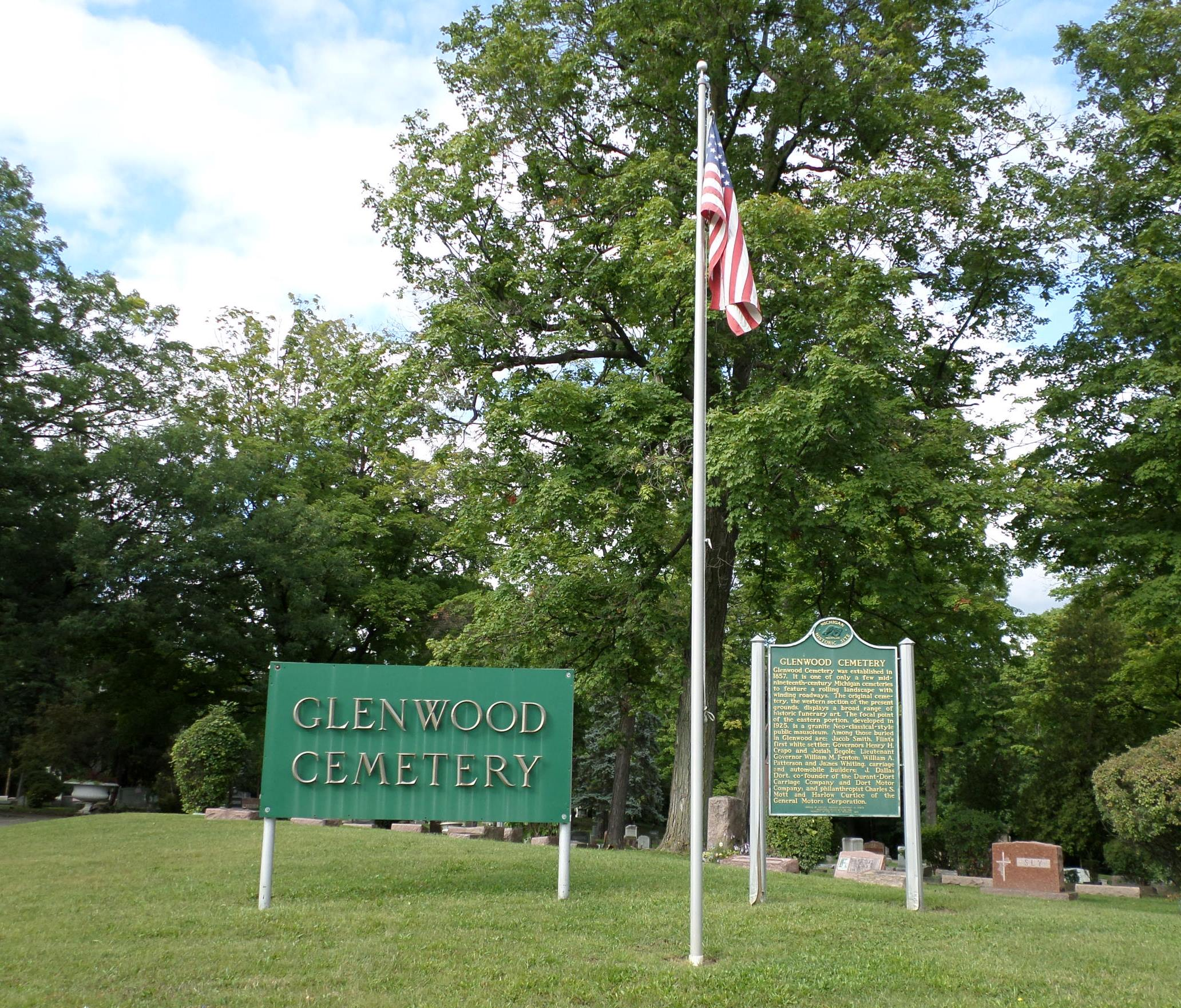
- Interactive map
- Location: 2500 W Court St, Flint, Michigan
- Coordinates: 43°0′25″N 83°43′17″W
- Area: 37.2 acres (15.1 ha)
- Built: 1857
- Architect: George T. Clark; et al.
- Architectural style: Classical Revival, Late Victorian
- NRHP reference No.: 10000616
- Added to NRHP: September 2, 2010

Glenwood Cemetery is a cemetery located at 2500 W Court Street in Flint, Michigan. It was listed on the National Register of Historic Places in 2010.

== History ==
Flint was incorporated as a city in 1855. At the time, the area cemetery was beginning to decay, so in 1857 a group of leading citizens met to plan the construction of a cemetery suitable for the new city. The group formed the Glenwood Cemetery Association. Thirty acres of land was quickly acquired, and George T. Clark hired as a civil engineer. The new Glenwood Cemetery formally dedicated in October 1857. A gateway, chapel, and receiving vault (all now long-demolished) and the sexton's office (still standing) were built soon after, and the grounds graded and landscaped, including broad, winding roads and footpaths.

The cemetery added six acres of land in 1901, and constructed a new mausoleum in 1914. No further additions to the cemetery grounds were made, and the Glenwood Cemetery Association continues to own and operate Glenwood Cemetery.

== Notable burials ==
Significant burials at Glenwood include:

- Jacob Smith, the first European settler of Flint, considered the founder of Flint (1780-1825).
- Henry H. Crapo, Michigan governor and businessman (1804-69).
- Josiah W. Begole, Michigan governor (1815-96).
- J. Dallas Dort, carriage maker and early auto pioneer (1861-1925).
- Charles Stewart Mott, director of General Motors and philanthropist (1875-1973).
- Harlow H. Curtice, CEO of General Motors (1893-1962).
- Robert P. Aitken, member of the Michigan House of Representatives (1819–1905).
- Arthur Giles Bishop, banker and GM executive, namesake of Bishop International Airport (1851–1944).
- Jackson (Jax) Miller, member of Static Lung (1974-1995)

== Description ==
Glenwood Cemetery is located on high, rolling ground overlooking the Flint River. The grounds are heavily wooded, and laid out with curving pathways through the grounds. A tall black wrought iron fence fronts the cemetery, and contains a main entrance with double-leaf iron gates between square random ashlar masonry gate posts of whitish random ashlar masonry that support double-leaf iron gates. Just inside the gate is the original sexton's office, a one-and-a-half-story gable-front building with a shed-roof addition. A second, similar entrance is located down the street. The later addition to the cemetery, located at the far eastern side, contains a Neoclassical mausoleum of gray granite.

The grounds contain gravestones and monuments dating from the founding of the cemetery through the present. Early monuments include a substantial number of white marble markers, many of them obelisks, dating from the late 1850s to the 1870s. A few early sandstone and limestone monuments are also in the cemetery. The majority of monuments are granite, coming in a range of hues, dating from the 1880s and later.
