= Wayne Marshall (basketball) =

American basketball player

No. 50 – Shinshu Brave Warriors
- Position: Center
- League: B.League

Personal information
- Born: January 7, 1986 (age 40) Philadelphia, Pennsylvania, U.S.
- Listed height: 6 ft 11 in (2.11 m)
- Listed weight: 287 lb (130 kg)

Career information
- College: Temple (2004–2008)
- NBA draft: 2008: undrafted
- Playing career: 2009–present

Career history
- 2009-2010: Lawton-Fort Sill Cavalry
- 2010: Vancouver Titans
- 2010-2012: Osaka Evessa
- 2012-2013: Shinshu Brave Warriors
- 2013-2015: Yokohama B-Corsairs
- 2015-2017: Shimane Susanoo Magic
- 2017-2018: Kanazawa Samuraiz
- 2018-present: Shinshu Brave Warriors

Career highlights
- B2 Block leader (2020)

Wayne Marshall (born January 7, 1986) is an American professional basketball player for Shinshu Brave Warriors of the Japanese B.League.

== Career statistics ==
Legend
GP	Games played	GS	Games started	MPG	Minutes per game
FG%	Field goal percentage	3P%	3-point field goal percentage	FT%	Free throw percentage
RPG	Rebounds per game	APG	Assists per game	SPG	Steals per game
BPG	Blocks per game	PPG	Points per game	**Bold**	Career high

Year	Team	GP	GS	MPG	FG%	3P%	FT%	RPG	APG	SPG	BPG	PPG
2011-12	Osaka	48		29.3	.456	.429	.626	6.9	1.6	0.7	1.6	11.2
2012-13	Shinshu	24		25.9	.533	.500	.769	7.3	1.1	0.8	2.0	14.6
2013-14	Yokohama	48		22.8	.485	.000	.566	5.1	1.2	0.5	1.4	11.0
2014-15	Yokohama	38		24.8	.467	.000	.637	5.9	2.1	1.0	1.0	11.3
