= Jamel Artis =

American basketball player (born 1993)

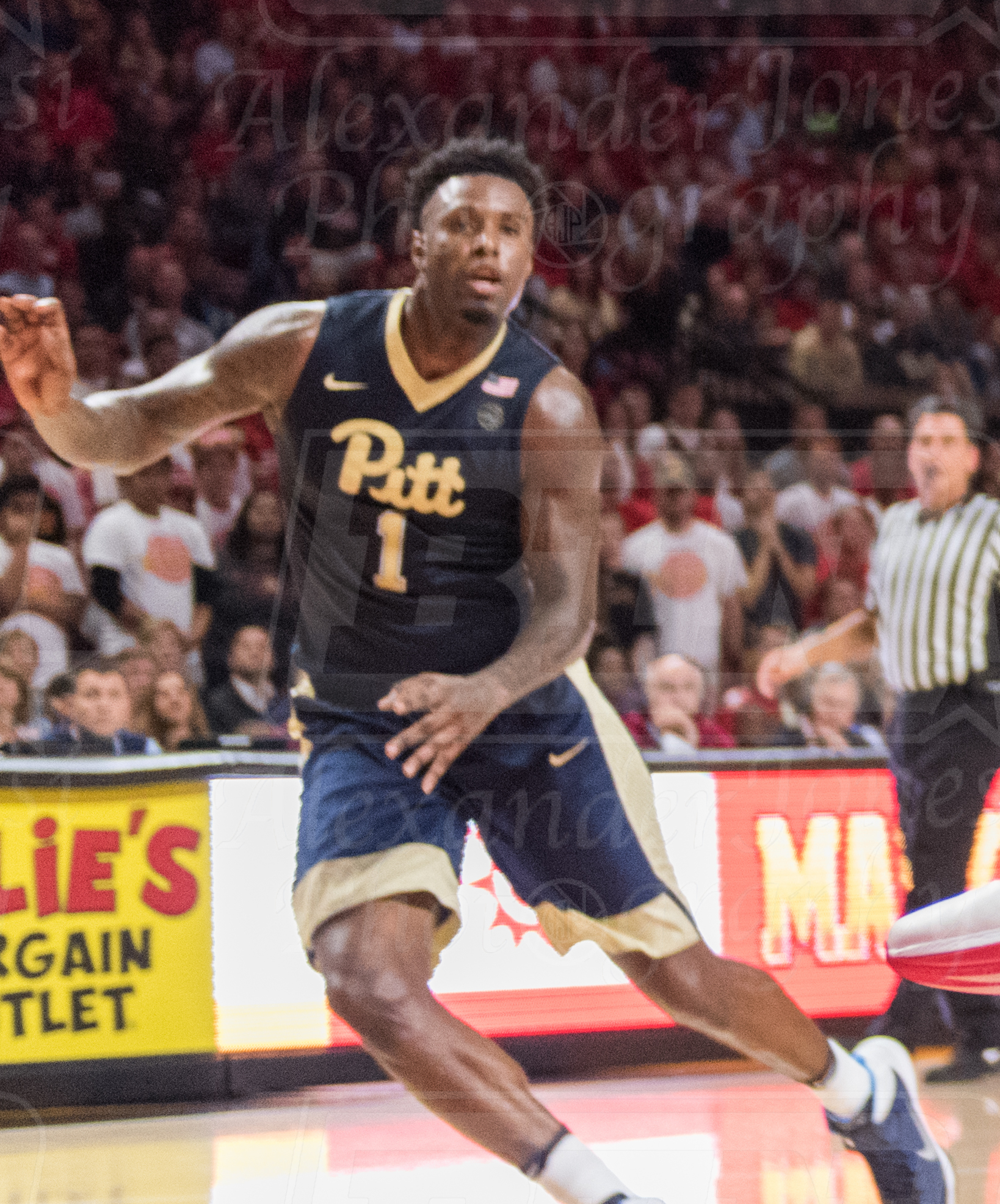
- Artis in 2018

No. 0 – Al Wahda Damascus
- Position: Shooting guard / small forward

Personal information
- Born: January 12, 1993 (age 33) Baltimore, Maryland, U.S.
- Listed height: 6 ft 7 in (2.01 m)
- Listed weight: 213 lb (97 kg)

Career information
- High school: Notre Dame Prep (Fitchburg, Massachusetts)
- College: Pittsburgh (2013–2017)
- NBA draft: 2017: undrafted
- Playing career: 2017–present

Career history
- 2017–2018: Orlando Magic
- 2017–2018: →Lakeland Magic
- 2018–2019: Agua Caliente Clippers
- 2019–2020: Levallois Metropolitans
- 2020: BC Juventus
- 2021: Chorale Roanne Basket
- 2021: Kyoto Hannaryz
- 2021: Ionikos Nikaias
- 2022: NorthPort Batang Pier
- 2022: Cape Town Tigers
- 2022–2023: Trepça
- 2023: Mineros de Zacatecas
- 2023–2024: CS Maristes
- 2024–present: Al Wahda

Career highlights
- Kosovo Cup winner (2023)
- Stats at NBA.com
- Stats at Basketball Reference

Jamel Gurley Artis (born January 12, 1993) is an American professional basketball player for Al Wahda. A native of Baltimore, he played college basketball for University of Pittsburgh.

== College career ==
From Notre Dame Prep in Massachusetts, on April 12, 2013, he signed to play for the Pittsburgh Panthers. As a freshman, Artis played at power forward coming off the bench. Following the 2014–15 Atlantic Coast Conference men's basketball season, Artis was named All-ACC third team. Artis received All-ACC honorable mention honors as a senior.

== Professional career ==
=== Orlando Magic (2017–2018) ===
After going undrafted in the 2017 NBA draft, Artis signed a partially guaranteed contract to join the New York Knicks' 2017 NBA Summer League roster on June 24, 2017. He averaged 8.8 points, 2.4 rebounds and 1.4 assists for 18 minutes per game through five games. On August 18, 2017, Artis signed with the New York Knicks. He was released during preseason training camp on October 4. Twelve days later, Artis agreed to a two-way contract with the Orlando Magic, meaning a split in his playing time between Orlando and their NBA G League affiliate, the Lakeland Magic. Artis made his NBA debut with Orlando on December 13, playing for a single minute in a 106–95 loss to the Los Angeles Clippers.

=== Agua Caliente Clippers (2018–2019) ===
On September 24, 2018, Artis signed with the Sacramento Kings for training camp. On October 7, 2018, Artis was waived by the Kings.

=== Levallois Metropolitans (2019–2020) ===
On July 3, 2019, Levallois Metropolitans announced that Artis joined them. He averaged 13.3 points, 4.1 rebounds and 1.7 assists per game.

=== BC Juventus (2020) ===
On September 21, 2020, Artis signed with BC Juventus of the Lithuanian Basketball League.

=== Chorale Roanne (2020–2021) ===
On December 25, 2020, he has signed with Chorale Roanne Basket of the LNB Pro A. In 26 games, he averaged 11.1 points, 2.7 rebounds, and 2.1 assists per game.

=== Kyoto Hannaryz (2021) ===
On August 31, 2021, Artis signed with Kyoto Hannaryz of the B.League.

=== Ionikos Nikaias (2021) ===
On September 29, 2021, Artis signed with Ionikos Nikaias of the Greek Basket League. On November 1, he was released from the Greek club.

=== NorthPort Batang Pier (2022) ===
On December 31, 2021, Artis joined the NorthPort Batang Pier of the Philippine Basketball Association (PBA) for the 2021 PBA Governors' Cup as a replacement for the injured Cameron Forte.

=== Cape Town Tigers (2022) ===
In April 2022, Artis was revealed to be on the roster of the Cape Town Tigers for the second season of the Basketball Africa League (BAL).

=== Trepça (2022–2023) ===
On December 12, 2022, Artis signed with Trepça of the Kosovo Superleague. Artis won the Kosovo Cup with Trepça.

== NBA career statistics ==
Legend
GP	Games played	GS	Games started	MPG	Minutes per game
FG%	Field goal percentage	3P%	3-point field goal percentage	FT%	Free throw percentage
RPG	Rebounds per game	APG	Assists per game	SPG	Steals per game
BPG	Blocks per game	PPG	Points per game	**Bold**	Career high

=== Regular season ===
Year	Team	GP	GS	MPG	FG%	3P%	FT%	RPG	APG	SPG	BPG	PPG
2017–18	Orlando	15	1	18.6	.392	.276	.583	2.5	1.2	.1	.2	5.1
Career		15	1	18.6	.392	.276	.583	2.5	1.2	.1	.2	5.1
