= Tyler Hines =

American basketball player and coach (born 1990)

Rowan Profs
- Title: Assistant coach
- League: New Jersey Athletic Conference

Personal information
- Born: June 27, 1990 (age 36) Philadelphia, Pennsylvania, U.S.
- Listed height: 6 ft 6 in (1.98 m)
- Listed weight: 230 lb (104 kg)

Career information
- High school: Timber Creek (Erial, New Jersey)
- College: Maryland Eastern Shore (2008–2012)
- NBA draft: 2012: undrafted
- Playing career: 2012–2018
- Position: Power forward / center
- Coaching career: 2024–present

Career history

Playing
- 2012–2013: Peristeri
- 2014: Caciques de Humacao
- 2014: KK Kumanovo
- 2015: RSV Eintracht Stahnsdorf
- 2016–2017: Enosis Neon Paralimni
- 2018: WBC Raiffeisen Wels

Coaching
- 2024–present: Rowan (assistant)

Reginald Tyler Hines (born June 27, 1990) is an American college basketball assistant coach for Rowan University of the New Jersey Athletic Conference. He played college basketball for Maryland Eastern Shore before playing professionally in Greece, Germany, Macedonia, Cyprus and Austria, as well as Puerto Rico.

== College career ==
Hines played college basketball for the University of Maryland Eastern Shore's Hawks, from 2008 to 2012.

== Professional career ==
After not being selected in the 2012 NBA draft, Hines signed with the Greek club Peristeri, where he played one season in the Greek Basket League. In 23 games played, he averaged 10.2 points, 6.2 rebounds, 1.0 Blocks and 1.4 assists per game. In August 2014, Hines signed a one-year contract with the Macedonian First League club Kumanovo. On January 30, 2018, Hines joined WBC Raiffeisen Wels of the Austrian ÖBL League

== Coaching career ==
Hines joined Rowan University's men's basketball coaching staff as an assistant coach prior to the 2024–25 season.

== Personal life ==
Born in Philadelphia, Pennsylvania, to Deidre Ledgister and Reggie Hines. Hines' father, Reggie, was a part of several different NFL training camps. He also has an older sibling, Kyle Hines (also a professional basketball player), and one younger sister.
