= Eric Thompson (basketball) =

American basketball player (born 1993)

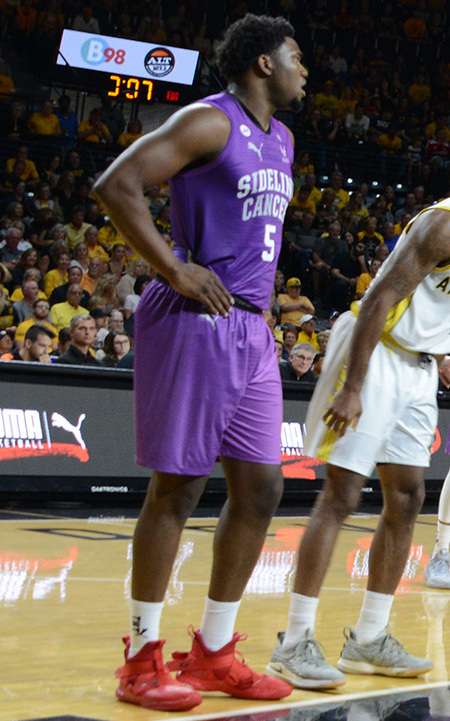
- Thompson during The Basketball Tournament 2019

Personal information
- Born: August 4, 1993 (age 32) Detroit, Michigan, U.S.
- Listed height: 6 ft 9 in (2.06 m)
- Listed weight: 240 lb (109 kg)

Career information
- High school: Clawson (Clawson, Michigan)
- College: Lake Michigan (2011–2012); Saddleback (2013–2014); Pacific (2014–2016)
- NBA draft: 2016: undrafted
- Playing career: 2016–present
- Position: Center

Career history
- 2016–2017: ETB Schwarz-Weiß
- 2017–2018: Swiss Central
- 2018: Hefei Yuanchuang
- 2018–2019: Hiroshima Dragonflies
- 2019: Kagawa Five Arrows
- 2019–2020: Hapoel Eilat
- 2020–2021: Incheon Electroland Elephants
- 2021: Hapoel Be'er Sheva
- 2021–2023: CSO Voluntari
- 2023: Dorados de Chihuahua
- 2023–2024: Iwate Big Bulls
- 2024: Cocodrilos de Caracas
- 2025: Indios de Ciudad Juárez
- 2026: Pioneros de Los Mochis

Career highlights
- Romanian Cup winner (2022)

Eric Thompson (born August 4, 1993) is an American professional basketball player for the Pioneros de Los Mochis of the CIBACOPA. He played college basketball for Lake Michigan, Saddleback and the University of the Pacific before playing professionally in Germany, Switzerland, China, Japan and Israel.

== Early life and college career ==
Thompson attended Pontiac High School in Pontiac, Michigan. He started his college basketball career at Lake Michigan College, where he averaged 9.7 points, 9.6 rebounds, 1.9 blocks and 1.2 steals per game, while shooting 55 percent from the field for the Red Hawks.

Thompson transferred to Saddleback College in Mission Viejo, California after redshirting in the 2012–13 season. Thompson led Saddleback to 24 wins, leading the team with 12.7 points and 8.6 rebounds (15th in state) per game. Thompson went on to play his final two years of college at the University of the Pacific, where he averaged 9.9 points, 7.5 rebounds and 1 block per game in his senior year.

== Professional career ==
=== 2016–17 season ===
On July 4, 2016, Thompson started his professional career with ETB Schwarz-Weiß of the German ProA. In 30 games played during the 2016–17 season, he averaged 10 points and 8 rebounds per game.

=== 2017–18 season ===
On September 5, 2017, Thompson signed a one-year deal with Swiss Central Basket Luzern of the Swiss Basketball League. On March 4, 2018, Thompson recorded a double-double with a season-high 27 points and 15 rebounds, shooting 10-of-13 from the field, in a 75–83 loss to SAM Basket Massagno. In 25 games played for Luzern, he averaged a double-double of 16.2 points and 11.2 rebounds, while shooting 63.3 percent from the field.

On June 13, 2018, Thompson signed with Hefei Yuanchuang of the Chinese NBL for the 2018 season. On July 11, 2018, Thompson recorded a career-high 42 points, shooting 16-of-24 from the field, along with 23 rebounds and three blocks in a 119–150 loss to Hebei Xianglan. In 25 games played for Hefei, he averaged an impressive 23 points and 20 rebounds per game, while shooting 69.6 percent from the field.

=== 2018–19 season ===
On September 18, 2019, Thompson signed with the Hiroshima Dragonflies of the Japanese B.League. On February 10, 2019, Thompson parted ways with the Dragonflies to join the Kagawa Five Arrows for the rest of the season. On March 2, 2019, Thompson recorded a double-double of 24 points and 21 rebounds for 45 PIR, leading the Arrows to an 82–65 win over the Shinshu Brave Warriors. He was subsequently named the B.League Round 44 Best Performer. In 17 games played for the Arrows, he averaged 16.1 points and 14.4 rebounds and 2.6 assists per game.

=== 2019–20 season ===
On August 28, 2019, Thompson signed a one-year deal with Hapoel Eilat of the Israeli Premier League. Thompson averaged 11.6 points and 9.3 rebounds per game.

=== 2020–21 season ===
On July 8, Thompson signed with Incheon Electroland Elephants of the Korean Basketball League.

=== 2021–22 season ===
On August 4, 2021, he has signed with CSO Voluntari of the Liga Națională. On February 17, 2022, Voluntari won the Romanian Cup after a final in which Thompson scored 13 points and grabbed 8 rebounds.

== Career statistics ==
Legend
GP	Games played	MPG	Minutes per game	FG%	Field goal percentage
3P%	3-point field goal percentage	FT%	Free throw percentage	RPG	Rebounds per game
APG	Assists per game	SPG	Steals per game	BPG	Blocks per game
PPG	Points per game	**Bold**	Career high		Led the league

Year	Team	League	GP	MPG	FG%	3P%	FT%	RPG	APG	SPG	BPG	PPG
2016–17	ETB Wohnbau Baskets	ProA	30	23.8	.529	.000	.626	8.0	.8	.8	.9	10.0
2017–18	Swiss Central Basket	Swiss League	23	29.4	.649	.000	.605	11.0	.9	.8	1.0	15.9
2017–18	Hefei Yuanchuang	NBL-China	25	**42.2**	**.685**	.000	**.653**	**20.0**	1.6	.8	**1.2**	**23.0**
2018–19	Hiroshima / Kagawa	B.League	**47**	31.8	.603	.000	.568	11.8	**2.0**	.8	.5	13.4
2019–20	Hapoel Eilat	IPL	21	28.9	.525	.000	.589	9.3	1.1	.8	.7	11.6
Career		All Leagues	146	31.1	.611	.000	.607	11.9	1.4	.8	.8	14.5

== Awards and accomplishments ==
Voluntari

- Romanian Cup: (2022)
