= Horace C. Spencer =

American politician (1832–1926)

Member of the Michigan Senate from the 19th district
- In office 1884–1887
- Governor: Josiah Begole; Russell A. Alger
- Preceded by: George E. Taylor
- Succeeded by: Albert K. Roof

47th Mayor of the City of Flint, Michigan
- In office 1908–1909
- Preceded by: George E. McKinley
- Succeeded by: Guy W. Selby

Personal details
- Born: July 1832 Springville, New York, U.S.
- Died: November 1, 1926 (aged 94) home, Flint, Michigan
- Party: Republican
- Spouse: Catherine Morris
- Relations: Arthur G. Bishop, son-in-law
- Occupation: Hardware, banking
- Profession: Businessman

Horace C. Spencer (July 1832 – November 1, 1926) was a Michigan, Illinois, politician.

== Early life ==
In 1832, Spencer was born in Springville, Erie County, New York State or possibly Coutland, New York, United States. In 1853, he married Catherine Morris. Traveling to Michigan in 1866, he entered the hardware business until 1880. In 1877, he invested his money as one of the original stockholders in the Second National Bank of Bay City, Michigan. With the Genesee County Savings Bank in 1885, he served as a director then later as a vice-president and a chairman of the board of directors. From 1891 to 1903, Spencer served as the first cashier of Citizens Commercial and Savings Bank. He was also an initial member of the Board of Director.

== Political life ==
Elected to the Michigan State Senate twice, Spencer served during Governor Alger's term and was a redistricting committee member. He was elected as the mayor of the City of Flint in 1908 for a single 1-year term defeating the incumbent. He serve several terms on the Flint City park board.

== Post-political life ==
Horace C. Spencer died November 1, 1926, at his home in Flint, Michigan.

Political offices
Preceded by George E. McKinley	Mayor of Flint; 1908–1909	Succeeded by Guy W. Selby
