= List of 2017–18 NBA season transactions =

This is a list of transactions that have taken place during the off-season and the 2017–18 NBA season.

== Retirement ==
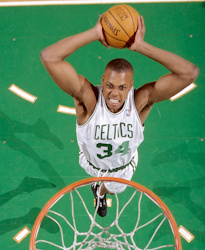
Paul Pierce with the Boston Celtics.

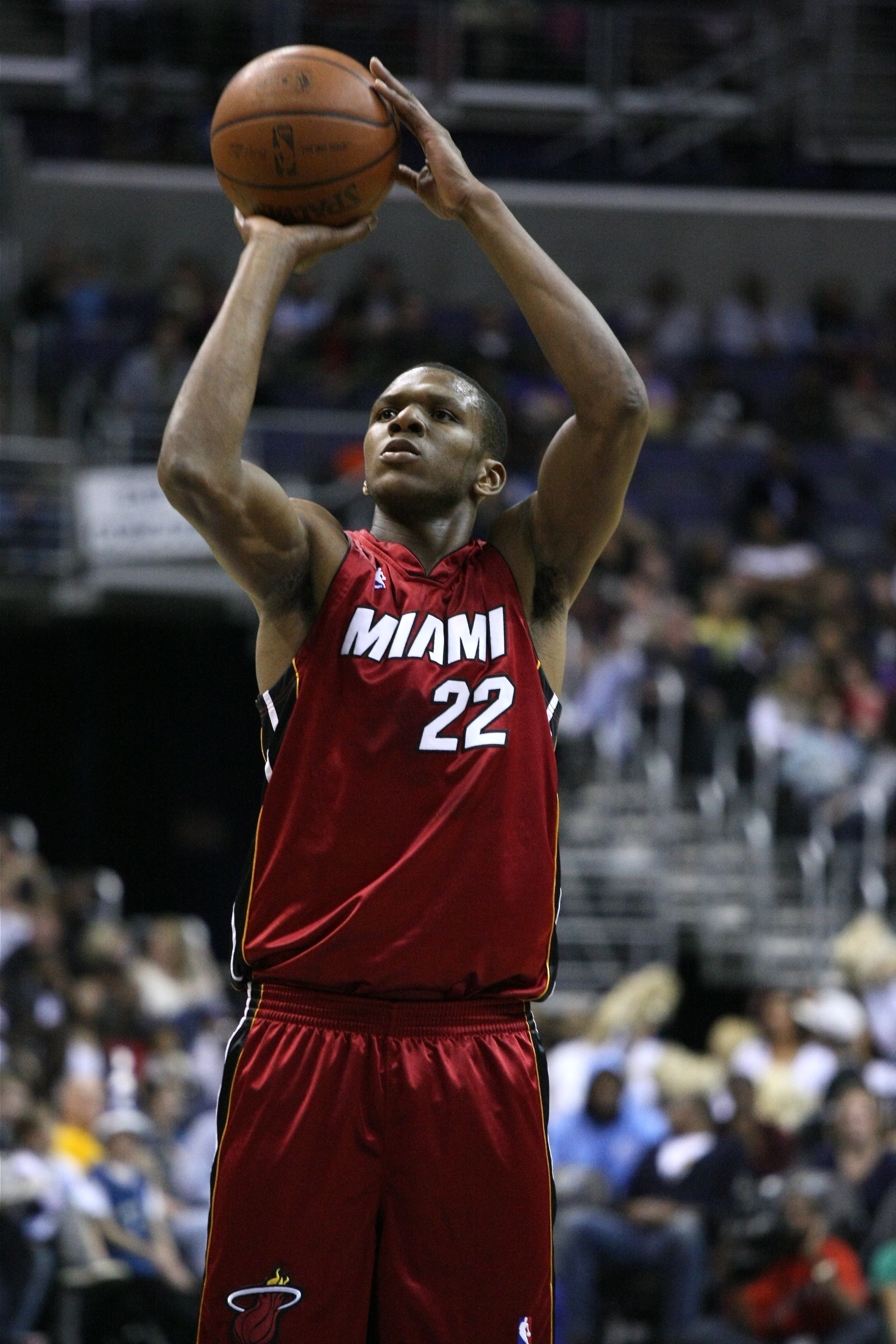
James Jones with the Miami Heat.

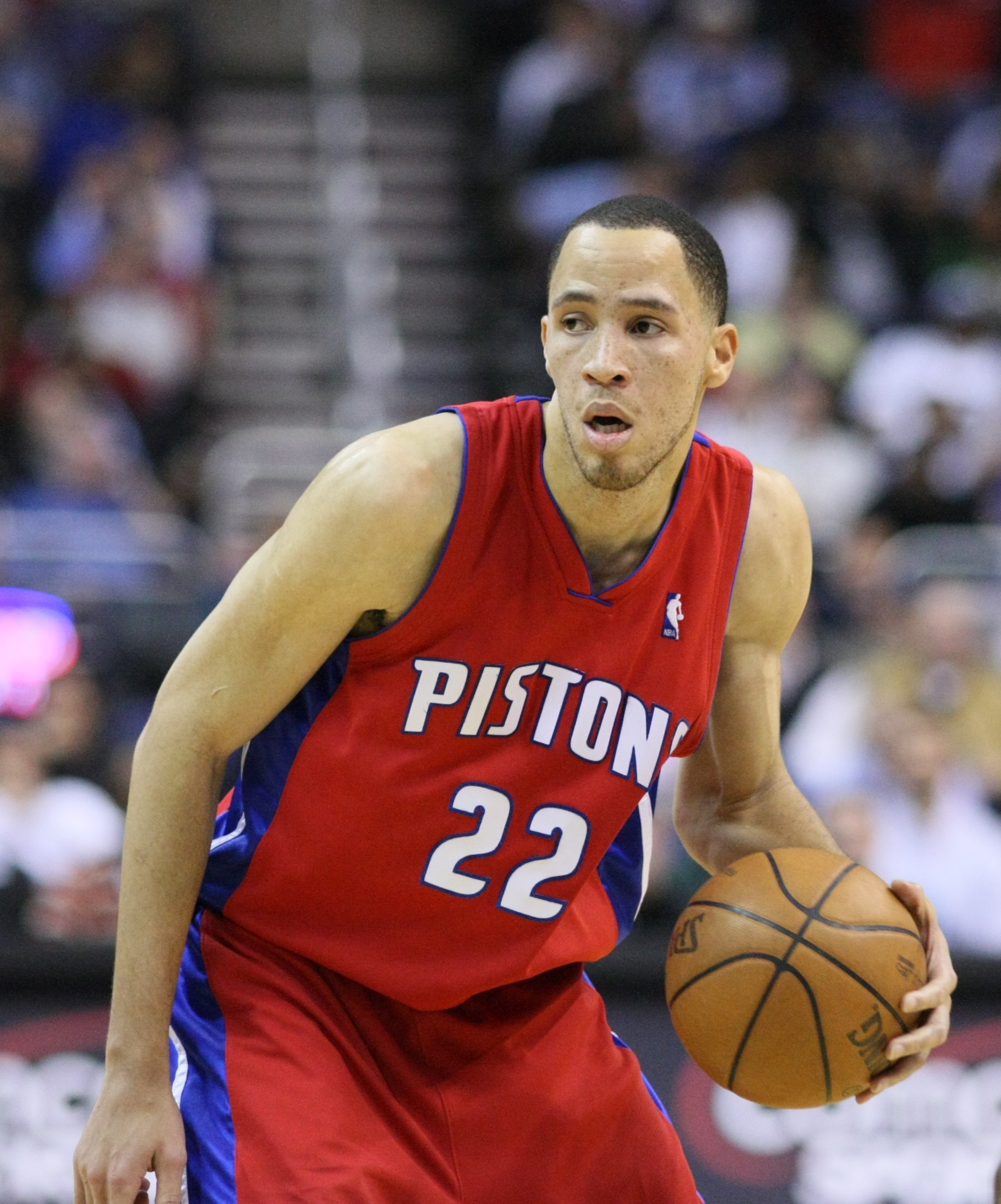
Tayshaun Prince with the Detroit Pistons during his first stint there.

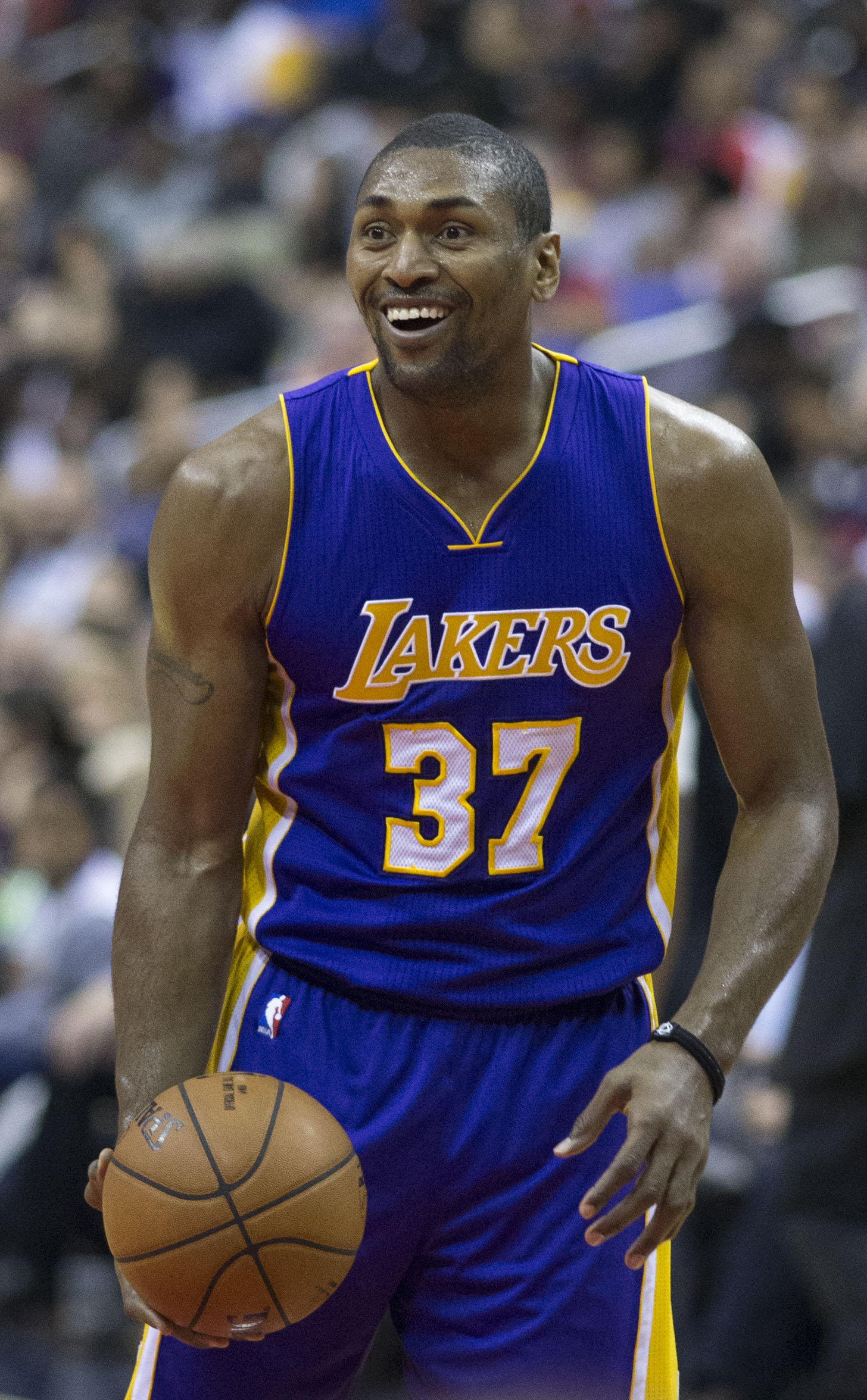
Metta World Peace with the Los Angeles Lakers during his second stint there.

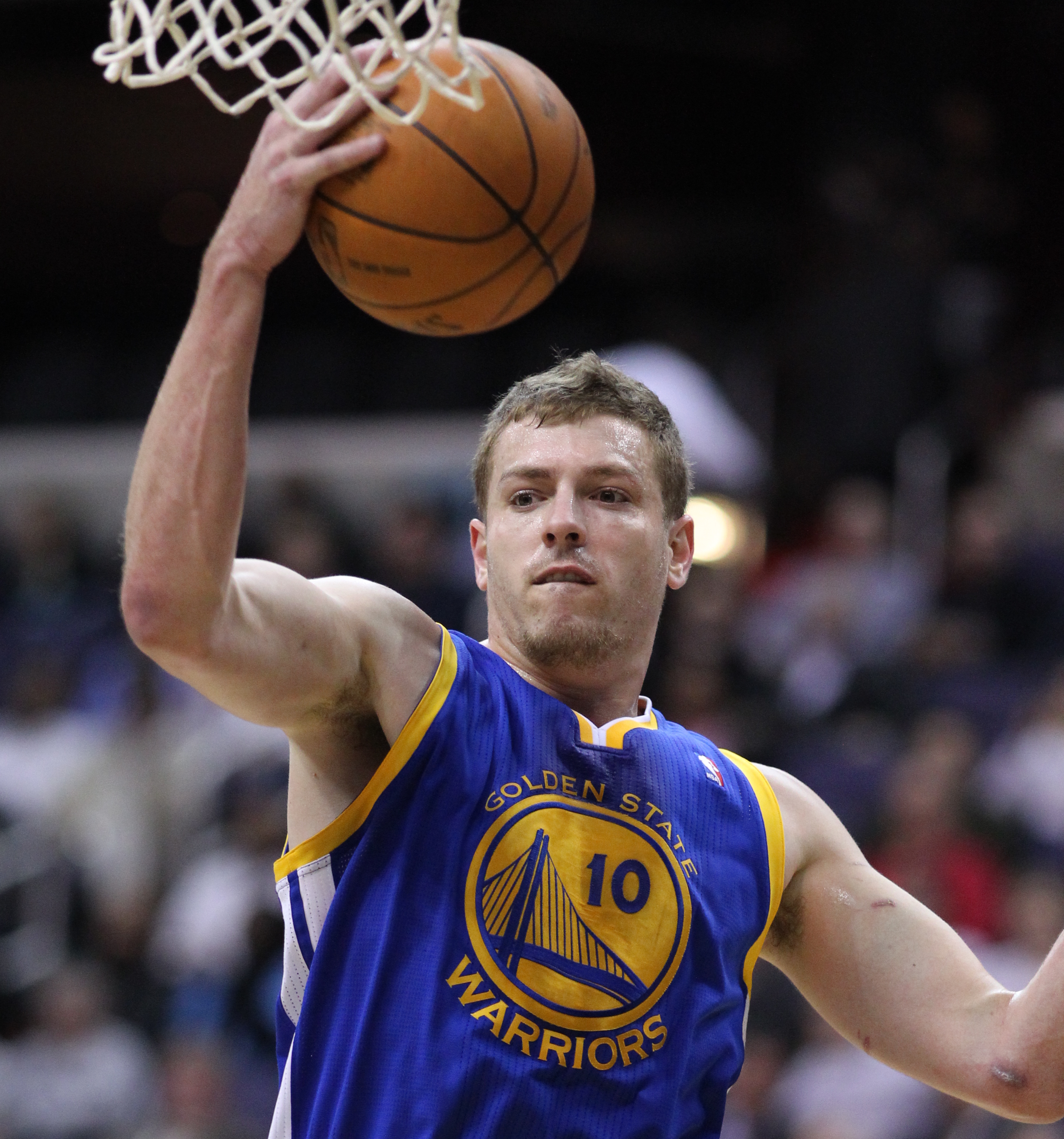
David Lee with the Golden State Warriors.

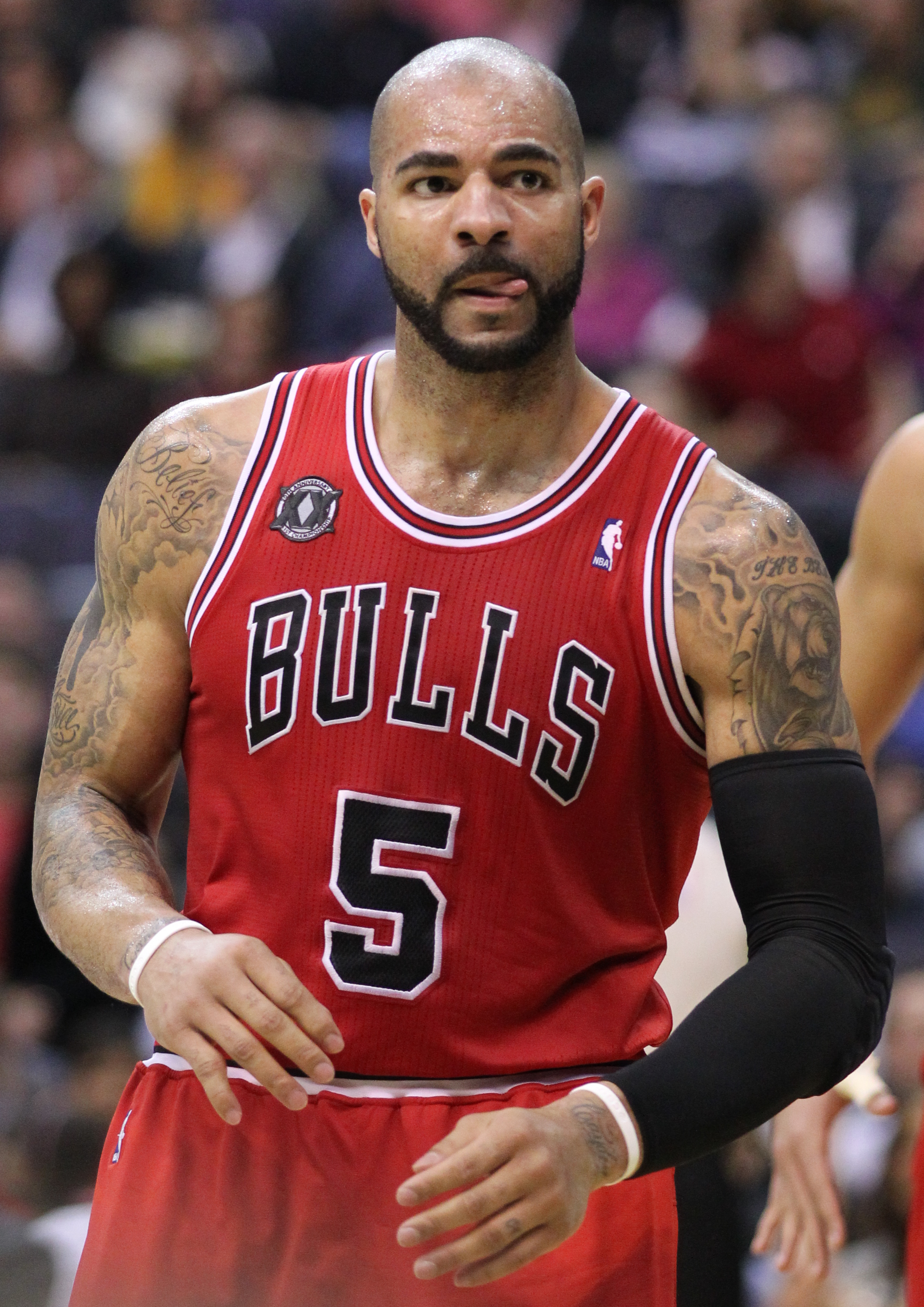
Carlos Boozer with the Chicago Bulls.

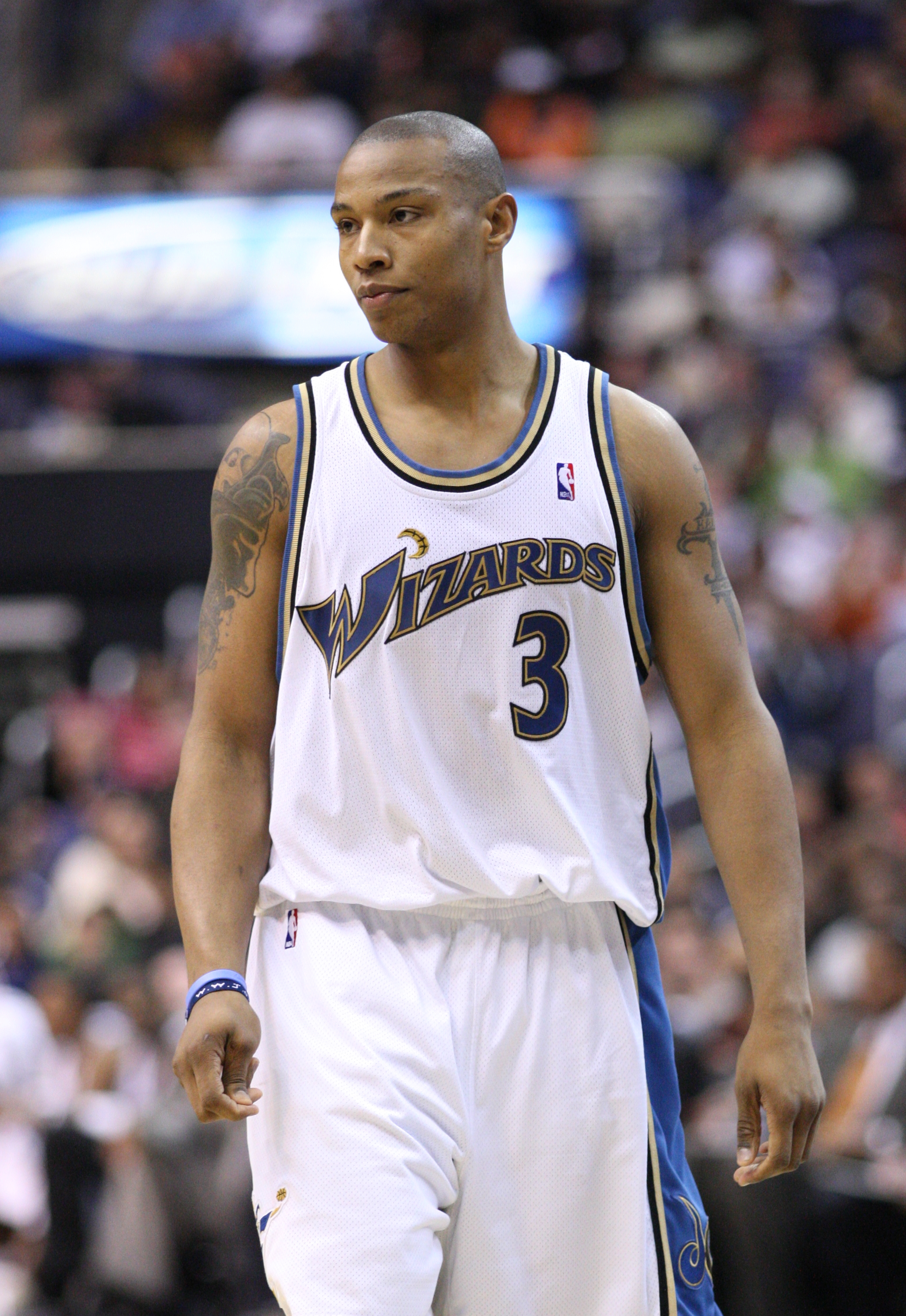
Caron Butler with the Washington Wizards.

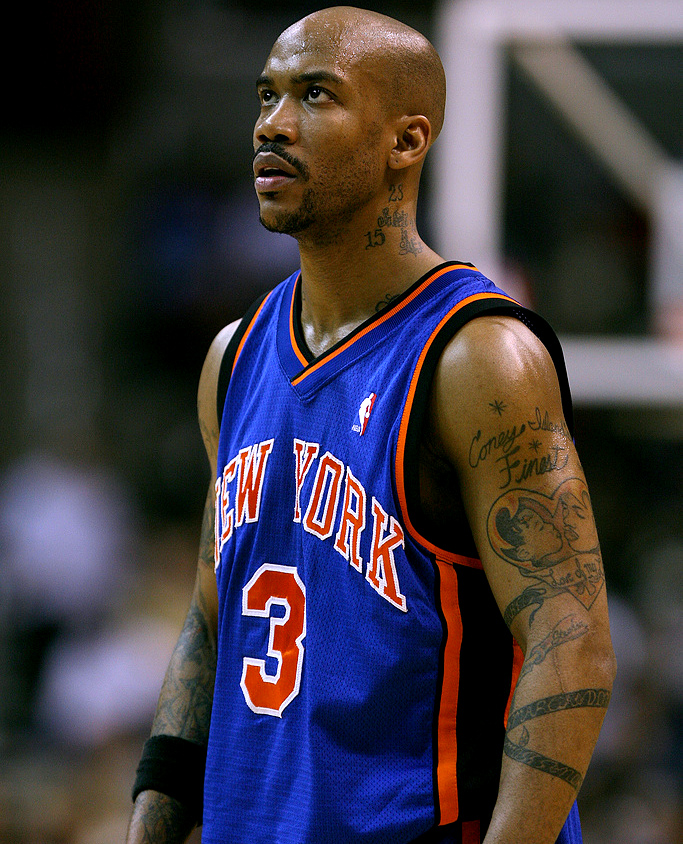
Stephon Marbury with the New York Knicks.

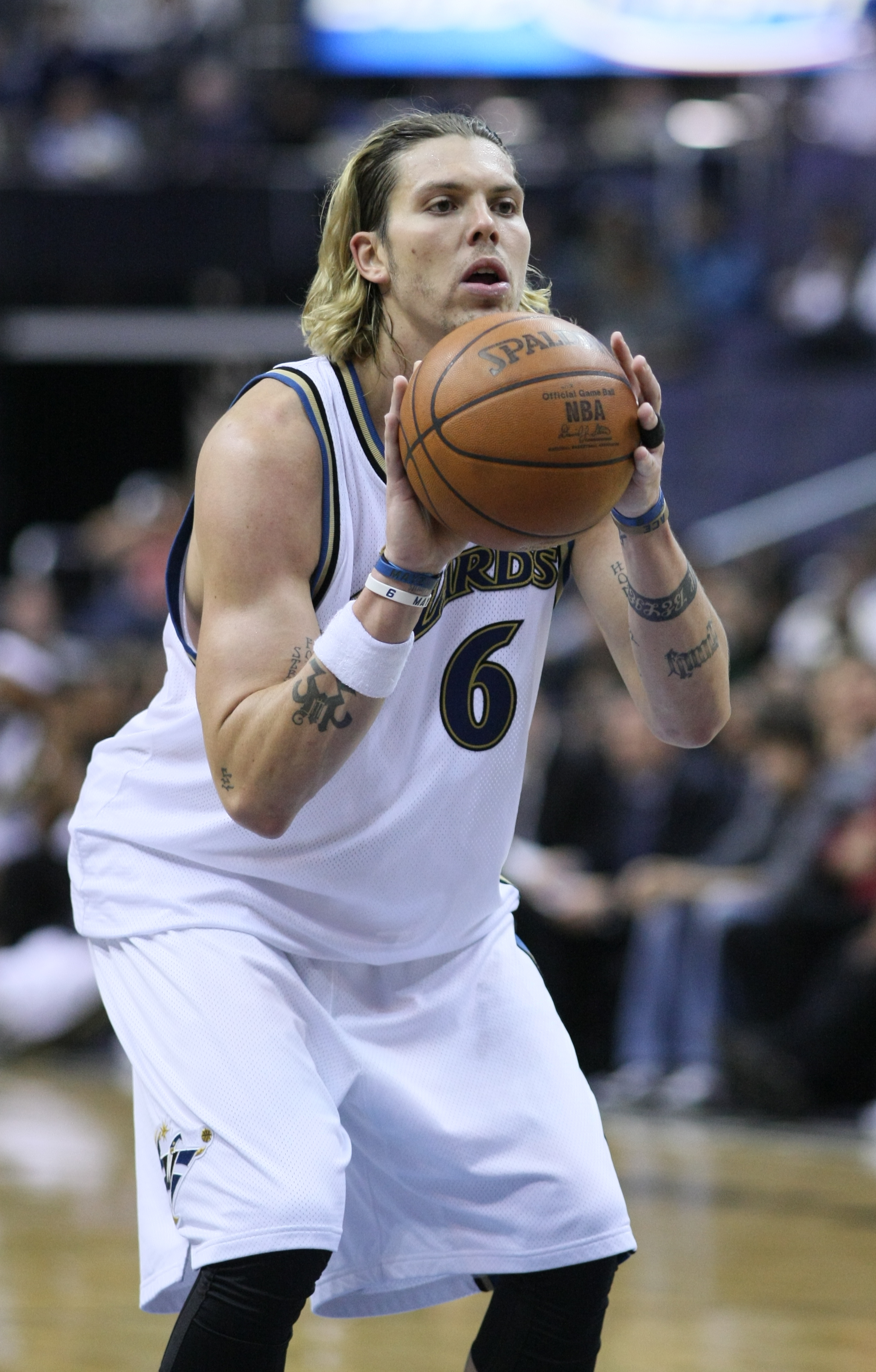
Mike Miller with the Washington Wizards.

Date	Name	Team(s) played (years)	Age	Notes	Ref.
June 17	Andrés Nocioni	Chicago Bulls (2004–2009); Sacramento Kings (2009–2010); Philadelphia 76ers (2010–2012)	37	Also played overseas	
July 17	Paul Pierce	Boston Celtics (1998–2013); Brooklyn Nets (2013–2014); Washington Wizards (2014–2015); Los Angeles Clippers (2015–2017)	39	NBA champion (2008); NBA Finals MVP (2008); 10× NBA All-Star (2002–2006, 2008–2012); All-NBA Second Team (2009); 3× All-NBA Third Team (2002, 2003, 2008); NBA All-Rookie First Team (1999)	
July 19	James Jones	Indiana Pacers (2003–2005); Phoenix Suns (2005–2007); Portland Trail Blazers (2007–2008); Miami Heat (2008–2014); Cleveland Cavaliers (2014–2017)	36	3x NBA champion (2012–2013, 2016); Three-Point Shootout Champion (2011); Hired as vice president of basketball operations by the Phoenix Suns	
August 4	Jason Maxiell	Detroit Pistons (2005–2013); Orlando Magic (2013–2014); Charlotte Hornets (2014–2015)	34	Also played overseas	
August 16	Tayshaun Prince	Detroit Pistons (2002–2013, 2015); Memphis Grizzlies (2013–2015); Boston Celtics (2015); Minnesota Timberwolves (2015–2016)	37	NBA champion (2004); 4x NBA All-Defensive Second Team (2005–2008); Hired as a special assistant to the GM by the Memphis Grizzlies	
August 25	Nazr Mohammed	Philadelphia 76ers (1998–2001); Atlanta Hawks (2001–2004); New York Knicks (2004–2005); San Antonio Spurs (2005–2006); Detroit Pistons (2006–2007); Charlotte Bobcats (2007–2011); Oklahoma City Thunder (2011–2012, 2016); Chicago Bulls (2012–2015)	39	NBA champion (2005)	
September 2	Primož Brezec	Indiana Pacers (2001–2004); Charlotte Bobcats (2004–2007); Detroit Pistons (2007–2008); Toronto Raptors (2008); Philadelphia 76ers (2009–2010); Milwaukee Bucks (2010)	37	Also played overseas Hired as an international scout by the Cleveland Cavaliers	
September 27	Steve Blake	Washington Wizards (2003–2005); Portland Trail Blazers (2005–2006, 2007–2010, 2014–2015); Milwaukee Bucks (2006–2007); Denver Nuggets (2007); Los Angeles Clippers (2010); Los Angeles Lakers (2010–2014); Golden State Warriors (2014); Detroit Pistons (2015–2016)	37	Also played overseas Hired as an intern in the Portland Trail Blazers coaching staff	
October 1	Martell Webster	Portland Trail Blazers (2005–2010); Minnesota Timberwolves (2010–2012); Washington Wizards (2012–2015)	30	Also played in the NBA D-League	
October 4	Robbie Hummel	Minnesota Timberwolves (2013–2015)	28	Also played overseas Became an ESPN Color Commentator and Studio Analyst	
October 7	Boštjan Nachbar	Houston Rockets (2002–2004); New Orleans/Oklahoma City Hornets (2004–2006); New Jersey Nets (2006–2008)	37	Also played overseas Hired as an international scout by the Detroit Pistons	
October 23	Metta World Peace	Chicago Bulls (1999–2002); Indiana Pacers (2002–2006); Sacramento Kings (2006–2008); Houston Rockets (2008–2009); Los Angeles Lakers (2009–2013, 2015–2017); New York Knicks (2013–2014)	37	NBA champion (2010); NBA All-Star (2004); NBA Defensive Player of the Year (2004); J. Walter Kennedy Citizenship Award (2011); Also played overseas Hired as Player Development Coach by the South Bay Lakers	
November 19	David Lee	New York Knicks (2005–2010); Golden State Warriors (2010–2015); Boston Celtics (2015–2016); Dallas Mavericks (2016); San Antonio Spurs (2016–2017)	34	NBA champion (2015); 2× NBA All-Star (2010, 2013); All-NBA Third Team (2013); NBA Rookie Challenge MVP (2007)	
November 20	Earl Barron	Miami Heat (2005–2008); New York Knicks (2010; 2013); Phoenix Suns (2010; 2015); Milwaukee Bucks (2011); Portland Trail Blazers (2011); Golden State Warriors (2012); Washington Wizards (2012)	36	NBA champion (2006); Also played overseas and in the D-League; Hired as assistant coach for the Northern Arizona Suns	
November 23	Kendall Marshall	Phoenix Suns (2012–2013); Los Angeles Lakers (2013–2014); Milwaukee Bucks (2014–2015); Philadelphia 76ers (2015–2016)	26	Also played in the D-League/G League	
December 11	Matt Barnes	Los Angeles Clippers (2004; 2012–2015); Sacramento Kings (2004–2005; 2016–2017); New York Knicks (2005); Philadelphia 76ers (2005–2006); Golden State Warriors (2006–2008; 2017); Phoenix Suns (2008–2009); Orlando Magic (2009–2010); Los Angeles Lakers (2010–2012); Memphis Grizzlies (2015–2016)	37	NBA champion (2017); Also played in the D-League and ABA	
December 18	Carlos Boozer	Cleveland Cavaliers (2002–2004); Utah Jazz (2004–2010); Chicago Bulls (2010–2014); Los Angeles Lakers (2014–2015)	36	2x NBA All-Star (2007–2008); All-NBA Third Team (2008); NBA All-Rookie Second Team (2003); Also played overseas in China	
February 6	Caron Butler	Miami Heat (2002–2004); Los Angeles Lakers (2004–2005); Washington Wizards (2005–2010); Dallas Mavericks (2010–2011); Los Angeles Clippers (2011–2013); Milwaukee Bucks (2013–2014); Oklahoma City Thunder (2014); Detroit Pistons (2014–2015); Sacramento Kings (2015–2016)	37	NBA champion (2011); 2× NBA All-Star (2007–2008); NBA All-Rookie First Team (2003)	
February 11	Stephon Marbury	Minnesota Timberwolves (1996–1999); New Jersey Nets (1999–2001); Phoenix Suns (2001–2004); New York Knicks (2004–2009); Boston Celtics (2009)	40	2x NBA All-Star (2001, 2003); 2x All-NBA Third Team (2000, 2003); NBA All-Rookie First Team (1997); Later played overseas in China	
February 19	Tiago Splitter	San Antonio Spurs (2010–2015); Atlanta Hawks (2015–2017); Philadelphia 76ers (2017)	33	Previously played overseas NBA champion (2014); Also played overseas and in the D-League	
April 12	Mike Miller	Orlando Magic (2000–2003); Memphis Grizzlies (2003–2008; 2013–2014); Minnesota Timberwolves (2008–2009); Washington Wizards (2009–2010); Miami Heat (2010–2013); Cleveland Cavaliers (2014–2015); Denver Nuggets (2015–2017)	38	2x NBA champion (2012, 2013); NBA Sixth Man of the Year Award (2006); NBA Rookie of the Year Award (2001); NBA All-Rookie First Team (2001); Hired as an assistant coach by Memphis	
May 10	Nick Collison	Seattle SuperSonics/Oklahoma City Thunder (2003–2018)	37	Spent his entire career with one franchise.	
May 14	Boštjan Nachbar	Houston Rockets (2002–2004); New Orleans / Oklahoma City Hornets (2004–2006); New Jersey Nets (2006–2008)	37	Also played overseas	
May 31	Jiří Welsch	Golden State Warriors (2002–2003); Boston Celtics (2003–2005); Cleveland Cavaliers (2005); Milwaukee Bucks (2005–2006)	38	Also played overseas	

== Front office movements ==
=== Head coach changes ===
In-season

Departure date	Team	Outgoing head coach	Reason for departure	Hire date	Incoming head coach	Last coaching position	Ref.
October 22	Phoenix Suns	Earl Watson	Fired	October 22	Jay Triano (interim)	Phoenix Suns associate coach (2016–2017)	
November 27	Memphis Grizzlies	David Fizdale	Fired	November 27	J. B. Bickerstaff	Memphis Grizzlies associate coach (2016–2017)	
January 22	Milwaukee Bucks	Jason Kidd	Fired	January 22	Joe Prunty (interim)	Milwaukee Bucks associate coach (2014–2018)	

=== General manager changes ===
Off-season

Departure date	Team	Outgoing general manager	Reason for departure	Hire date	Incoming general manager	Last managerial position	Ref.
April 13; May 23	Orlando Magic	Rob Hennigan; Matt Lloyd (interim)	Fired; Replaced/Demoted	May 23	John Hammond	Milwaukee Bucks general manager (2008–2017)	
May 5	Atlanta Hawks	Mike Budenholzer	Resigned	May 25	Travis Schlenk	Golden State Warriors assistant general manager (2012–2017)	
May 23	Milwaukee Bucks	John Hammond	Signed with Orlando	June 19	Jon Horst	Milwaukee Bucks director of basketball operations (2008–2017)	
June 14	Denver Nuggets	Tim Connelly	Promoted	June 14	Artūras Karnišovas	Denver Nuggets assistant general manager (2013–2017)	
June 19	Cleveland Cavaliers	David Griffin	Fired by owner	July 24	Koby Altman	Cleveland Cavaliers assistant general manager (2016–2017)	
July 14	New York Knicks	Steve Mills	Promoted	July 14	Scott Perry	Sacramento Kings vice president of basketball operations (2017)	
August 24	Los Angeles Clippers	Dave Wohl	Replaced	August 24	Michael Winger	Oklahoma City Thunder assistant general manager (2010–2017)	

In-season

Departure date	Team	Outgoing general manager	Reason for departure	Hire date	Incoming general manager	Last managerial position	Ref.
February 20; April 8	Charlotte Hornets	Rich Cho; Buzz Peterson (interim)	Contract not renewed Replaced/Demoted	April 8	Mitch Kupchak	Los Angeles Lakers general manager (2000–2017)	

== Player movement ==
=== Trades ===
June
June 19	To Philadelphia 76ers: 2017 Brooklyn first-round pick (#1)	To Boston Celtics: 2017 Sacramento first-round pick (#3); Future protected first-round pick (Note: Boston will receive the Lakers' own pick if it's #2-5. If Boston does not receive the Lakers' pick in 2018, they will receive the better of Sacramento's and the 76ers' 2019 first-round picks unless the better pick is No. 1, in which case Boston receives the worse of the two.)
June 20	To Charlotte Hornets: Dwight Howard; 2017 Brooklyn second-round pick (#31)	To Atlanta Hawks: Miles Plumlee; Marco Belinelli; 2017 Charlotte second-round pick (#41)
June 21	To New Orleans Pelicans: 2017 Washington second-round pick (#52)	To Washington Wizards: Tim Frazier
June 22 (Draft-day trades)	To Brooklyn Nets: D'Angelo Russell; Timofey Mozgov	To Los Angeles Lakers: Brook Lopez; Draft rights to Kyle Kuzma (#27)
June 22 (Draft-day trades)	To Charlotte Hornets: Draft rights to Dwayne Bacon (#40); Cash considerations	To New Orleans Pelicans: Draft rights to Frank Jackson (#31)
June 22 (Draft-day trades)	To Chicago Bulls: Cash considerations	To Golden State Warriors: Draft rights to Jordan Bell (#38)
June 22 (Draft-day trades)	To Chicago Bulls: Kris Dunn; Zach LaVine; Draft rights to Lauri Markkanen (#7)	To Minnesota Timberwolves: Jimmy Butler; Draft rights to Justin Patton (#16)
June 22 (Draft-day trades)	To Denver Nuggets: Trey Lyles; Draft rights to Tyler Lydon (#24)	To Utah Jazz: Draft rights to Donovan Mitchell (#13)
June 22 (Draft-day trades)	To Houston Rockets: Future second-round pick (Note: Details on which pick Houston will receive are scant; RealGM lists it as the worst of the three 2018 second-round picks originally belonging to Charlotte, Memphis, and Miami)	To Memphis Grizzlies: Draft rights to Dillon Brooks (#45)
June 22 (Draft-day trades)	To Indiana Pacers: Draft rights to Edmond Sumner (#52)	To New Orleans Pelicans: Cash considerations
June 22 (Draft-day trades)	To Los Angeles Clippers: Draft rights to Sindarius Thornwell (#48)	To Milwaukee Bucks: Cash considerations
June 22 (Draft-day trades)	To Los Angeles Lakers: Draft rights to Josh Hart (#30); Draft rights to Thomas Bryant (#42)	To Utah Jazz: Draft rights to Tony Bradley (#28)
June 22 (Draft-day trades)	To Memphis Grizzlies: Draft rights to Ivan Rabb (#35)	To Orlando Magic: 2019 Brooklyn second-round pick
June 22 (Draft-day trades)	To Orlando Magic: 2020 Oklahoma City first-round pick; 2020 second-round pick (Note: Orlando will receive the worse of Brooklyn and New York's picks.)	To Philadelphia 76ers: Draft rights to Anzejs Pasecniks (#25)
June 22 (Draft-day trades)	To Portland Trail Blazers: Draft rights to Zach Collins (#10)	To Sacramento Kings: Draft rights to Justin Jackson (#15); Draft rights to Harry Giles (#20)
June 28	To Atlanta Hawks: Cash considerations	To Houston Rockets: Ryan Kelly
June 28	To Dallas Mavericks: Cash considerations	To Houston Rockets: DeAndre Liggins
June 28	To Detroit Pistons: Cash considerations	To Houston Rockets: Darrun Hilliard
June 28	To Houston Rockets: Chris Paul	To Los Angeles Clippers: Patrick Beverley; Sam Dekker; Montrezl Harrell; Darrun Hilliard; DeAndre Liggins; Louis Williams; Kyle Wiltjer; 2018 first-round pick; Cash considerations
June 28	To Houston Rockets: Shawn Long	To Philadelphia 76ers: 2018 second-round pick; Cash considerations
June 28	To Houston Rockets: Tim Quarterman	To Portland Trail Blazers: Cash considerations
June 29	To Dallas Mavericks: Cash considerations	To Houston Rockets: Jarrod Uthoff
June 30	To Minnesota Timberwolves: 2018 Oklahoma City protected first-round pick	To Utah Jazz: Ricky Rubio
July
July 6	To Indiana Pacers: Victor Oladipo; Domantas Sabonis	To Oklahoma City Thunder: Paul George
July 6	To Los Angeles Clippers: Draft rights to Jawun Evans (#39)	To Philadelphia 76ers: Cash considerations
July 6	To Milwaukee Bucks: Draft rights to Sterling Brown (#46)	To Philadelphia 76ers: Cash considerations
July 6	Three-team trade	
July 6	To Atlanta Hawks: Jamal Crawford (from L.A. Clippers); Diamond Stone (from L.A. Clippers); 2018 Houston protected first-round pick (Note: Atlanta will receive Houston's 1st round pick (via L.A. Clippers) if it's #4-30; if not conveyed in 2018 the pick will roll over through 2023; if it hasn't been conveyed by 2023, Atlanta will get Houston's first-round pick in 2024.) (from L.A. Clippers); Cash considerations (from L.A. Clippers)	To Denver Nuggets: 2019 Washington second-round pick (from Atlanta)
July 6	To Los Angeles Clippers: Danilo Gallinari (from Denver) (sign and trade)	
July 7	To Dallas Mavericks: Josh McRoberts; 2023 second-round pick; Cash considerations	To Miami Heat: A.J. Hammons
July 7	To Boston Celtics: Marcus Morris	To Detroit Pistons: Avery Bradley; 2019 second-round pick
July 13	To Brooklyn Nets: DeMarre Carroll; 2018 lottery-protected first-round pick; 2018 second-round pick	To Toronto Raptors: Justin Hamilton
July 14	To Indiana Pacers: Cory Joseph	To Toronto Raptors: C. J. Miles; Draft rights to Emir Preldžić
July 14	To New York Knicks: Contractual release of Scott Perry (general manager)	To Sacramento Kings: 2019 second-round pick; Cash considerations
July 25	To Brooklyn Nets: Allen Crabbe	To Portland Trail Blazers: Andrew Nicholson
August
August 30	To Boston Celtics: Kyrie Irving	To Cleveland Cavaliers: Isaiah Thomas; Jae Crowder; Ante Žižić; 2018 Brooklyn first-round pick; 2020 Miami second-round pick
September
September 1	To Chicago Bulls: Quincy Pondexter; 2018 New Orleans second-round pick; Cash considerations	To New Orleans Pelicans: Draft rights to Ater Majok
September 22	To Phoenix Suns: Troy Daniels; 2018 second-round pick (Note: Phoenix will receive the middle of three selections originally belonging to Charlotte, Memphis and Miami.)	To Memphis Grizzlies: 2018 Phoenix protected second-round pick (Note: Memphis will receive Phoenix's 2018 second round pick if it's #56-60, otherwise they receive nothing.)
September 25	To New York Knicks: Enes Kanter; Doug McDermott; 2018 Chicago second-round pick	To Oklahoma City Thunder: Carmelo Anthony
September 25	To Atlanta Hawks: DeAndre Liggins; Cash considerations	To Los Angeles Clippers: Draft considerations (Note: Various unofficial sources state that the Clippers will receive the outstanding draft rights to an international player, which player will be named later; Atlanta currently owns such rights to Marcus Eriksson and Isaia Cordinier. RealGM has the traded pick as Atlanta's 2018 second-round pick protected for #31-55, extinguished if not conveyed.)
October
October 14	To Atlanta Hawks: Richard Jefferson; Kay Felder; 2019 second-round pick (Note: The second round pick is to be the lesser of second round picks owed by the Minnesota Timberwolves and Los Angeles Lakers in that year's draft.); 2020 Portland second-round pick; Cash considerations	To Cleveland Cavaliers: Draft rights to Sergiy Gladyr; Draft rights to Dimitrios Agravanis
November
November 7	To Milwaukee Bucks: Eric Bledsoe	To Phoenix Suns: Greg Monroe; 2018 protected first-round pick (Note: Phoenix will receive Milwaukee's 2018 first round pick if it's #11-16, 2019 if it's #4-16, 2020 if it's #8-30 and if still not yet conveyed it will be unprotected in 2021.); 2018 protected second-round pick (Note: Phoenix will receive Milwaukee's 2018 second round pick if it's #48-60, otherwise they receive nothing, with that selection going to Brooklyn later this year instead.)
December
December 7	To Philadelphia 76ers: Trevor Booker	To Brooklyn Nets: Jahlil Okafor; Nik Stauskas; 2019 New York second-round pick
January
January 29	To Detroit Pistons: Blake Griffin; Brice Johnson; Willie Reed	To Los Angeles Clippers: Avery Bradley; Boban Marjanović; Tobias Harris; 2018 Detroit protected first-round pick (Note: The Clippers will receive Detroit's pick if it's #5-30, else the pick will roll over with the same protection through 2020, then become unprotected in 2021.); 2019 second-round pick (Note: According to RealGM, Orlando has the right to swap picks with Cleveland or Houston; Portland will then receive the pick that Orlando ends up with and send the worse of the two to the Clippers.)
February
February 1	To New Orleans Pelicans: Nikola Mirotić; 2018 New Orleans second-round pick	To Chicago Bulls: Ömer Aşık; Tony Allen; Jameer Nelson; 2018 New Orleans protected first-round pick (Note: Chicago will receive the pick if it's #6-30, else the pick will roll over to 2019 (#9-30), 2020 (#11-30), 2021 (#10-30), and 2022 (#7-30); if not conveyed by 2022, it converts to the Pelicans' 2022 and 2023 second-round picks.); Right to swap 2021 second-round picks
February 5	To Brooklyn Nets: Rashad Vaughn; 2018 Milwaukee protected second-round pick (Note: Brooklyn will receive the pick if it's #31-47, else they will receive the Bucks' 2020 second-round pick)	To Milwaukee Bucks: Tyler Zeller
February 7	To Charlotte Hornets: Willy Hernangómez	To New York Knicks: Johnny O'Bryant III; 2020 Charlotte second-round pick; 2021 Charlotte second-round pick
February 8	To Chicago Bulls: Willie Reed; Right to swap 2022 second-round picks	To Detroit Pistons: Jameer Nelson
February 8	To Cleveland Cavaliers: Jordan Clarkson; Larry Nance Jr.	To Los Angeles Lakers: Isaiah Thomas; Channing Frye; 2018 protected first-round pick (Note: The pick is reported as being Cleveland's own 2018 first-round pick if it's number #4-30, else Cleveland's 2023 pick if it's #11-20, converting to Cleveland's second-round pick if not conveyed by then. The Cavaliers have already traded their 2019 first-round pick to Atlanta, so their own pick going to the Lakers would be against NBA rules against trading first-round picks in consecutive years; they do own Brooklyn's 2018 first-round pick, which they would be allowed to convey.)
February 8	To Detroit Pistons: James Ennis	To Memphis Grizzlies: Brice Johnson; 2022 second round pick (Note: Chicago has the option to swap picks with Detroit; Memphis will then receive the pick that Detroit has.)
February 8	To Atlanta Hawks: Okaro White	To Miami Heat: Luke Babbitt
February 8	Three-team trade	
February 8	To Cleveland Cavaliers: Rodney Hood (from Utah); George Hill (from Sacramento); Draft rights to Artūras Gudaitis (2015 #59) (from Sacramento)	To Sacramento Kings: Joe Johnson (from Utah); Iman Shumpert (from Cleveland); 2020 Miami second-round pick (from Cleveland); Draft rights to Dimitrios Agravanis (from Cleveland); Cash considerations (from Cleveland and Utah)
February 8	To Utah Jazz: Jae Crowder (from Cleveland); Derrick Rose (from Cleveland); Right to swap 2024 second-round picks with Cleveland	
February 8	To Cleveland Cavaliers: 2024 Miami protected second-round pick (Note: Cleveland will receive Miami's pick if it's #56-60, else they receive nothing.)	To Miami Heat: Dwyane Wade
February 8	Three-team trade	
February 8	To Dallas Mavericks: Doug McDermott (from New York); 2018 second-round pick (from Denver) (Note: Sacramento has the option to swap picks with Portland; Dallas will then receive the pick that Portland has.)	To Denver Nuggets: Devin Harris (from Dallas); 2018 second-round pick (from New York) (Note: Philadelphia has the option to swap New York's pick for the Los Angeles Clippers' pick; Denver will then receive the pick that New York has.)
February 8	To New York Knicks: Emmanuel Mudiay (from Denver)	
February 8	To Brooklyn Nets: Dante Cunningham	To New Orleans Pelicans: Rashad Vaughn
February 8	To Sacramento Kings: Bruno Caboclo	To Toronto Raptors: Malachi Richardson
February 8	To Chicago Bulls: Noah Vonleh	To Portland Trail Blazers: Draft rights to Milovan Raković; Cash considerations
February 8	To Atlanta Hawks: Sheldon Mac; Cash considerations	To Washington Wizards: 2019 Atlanta protected second-round pick (Note: Washington will receive the pick if it's #56-60, else they receive nothing.)
February 8	To Orlando Magic: 2018 second-round pick (Note: Orlando will receive the second-best of the three picks originally belonging to Charlotte, Memphis, and Miami.)	To Phoenix Suns: Elfrid Payton

=== Free agency ===
Free agency negotiation starts on Saturday, July 1, 2017. Players are allowed to sign new offers starting on July 6, after the July moratorium ended. The following players, who last played for an NBA team during the 2016–17 season, are scheduled to become free agents. All players became unrestricted free agents unless indicated otherwise. A restricted free agent's team has the right to keep the player by matching an offer sheet the player signs with another team.

Denotes unsigned players whose free-agent rights were renounced

Player	Date signed	New team	Former team	Ref
Wayne Selden Jr.**	July 1	Memphis Grizzlies		
Cristiano Felício (RFA)	July 6	Chicago Bulls		
Danilo Gallinari*	July 6	Los Angeles Clippers (via sign and trade)	Denver Nuggets	
Langston Galloway*	July 6	Detroit Pistons	Sacramento Kings	
Rudy Gay*	July 6	San Antonio Spurs	Sacramento Kings	
Nenê Hilario	July 6	Houston Rockets		
Jrue Holiday	July 6	New Orleans Pelicans		
Eric Moreland	July 6	Detroit Pistons	Canton Charge (G League)	
Dirk Nowitzki**	July 6	Dallas Mavericks		
P. J. Tucker	July 6	Houston Rockets	Toronto Raptors	
Michael Carter-Williams	July 7	Charlotte Hornets	Chicago Bulls	
Darren Collison	July 7	Indiana Pacers	Sacramento Kings	
Serge Ibaka	July 7	Toronto Raptors		
James Johnson	July 7	Miami Heat		
Kyle Lowry*	July 7	Toronto Raptors		
Ben McLemore	July 7	Memphis Grizzlies	Sacramento Kings	
Kelly Olynyk	July 7	Miami Heat	Boston Celtics	
Mike Scott (Note: Date of team/media announcement differs from that on the official NBA Transactions page. It's common for signings to be announced days after they take place.)	July 7	Washington Wizards	Phoenix Suns (waived on February 24)	
Dion Waiters*	July 7	Miami Heat		
Nick Young*	July 7	Golden State Warriors	Los Angeles Lakers	
Tim Hardaway Jr. (RFA)	July 8	New York Knicks	Atlanta Hawks	
Amir Johnson	July 8	Philadelphia 76ers	Boston Celtics	
JJ Redick	July 8	Philadelphia 76ers	Los Angeles Clippers	
Shelvin Mack	July 9	Orlando Magic	Utah Jazz	
Alfonzo McKinnie	July 9	Toronto Raptors	Windy City Bulls (G League)	
Bojan Bogdanović	July 10	Indiana Pacers	Washington Wizards	
José Calderón	July 10	Cleveland Cavaliers	Atlanta Hawks	
Vince Carter	July 10	Sacramento Kings	Memphis Grizzlies	
Tyreke Evans	July 10	Memphis Grizzlies	Sacramento Kings	
Raymond Felton	July 10	Oklahoma City Thunder	Los Angeles Clippers	
Taj Gibson	July 10	Minnesota Timberwolves	Oklahoma City Thunder	
George Hill	July 10	Sacramento Kings	Utah Jazz	
Justin Holiday	July 10	Chicago Bulls	New York Knicks	
Patrick Patterson	July 10	Oklahoma City Thunder	Toronto Raptors	
Zach Randolph	July 10	Sacramento Kings	Memphis Grizzlies	
Jeff Teague	July 10	Minnesota Timberwolves	Indiana Pacers	
Miloš Teodosić	July 10	Los Angeles Clippers	CSKA Moscow (Russia)	
Jeff Green	July 11	Cleveland Cavaliers	Orlando Magic	
Omri Casspi	July 12	Golden State Warriors	Minnesota Timberwolves	
Kyle Korver	July 12	Cleveland Cavaliers		
Jodie Meeks	July 12	Washington Wizards	Orlando Magic	
Kentavious Caldwell-Pope	July 13	Los Angeles Lakers	Detroit Pistons	
Maxi Kleber	July 13	Dallas Mavericks	FC Bayern Munich (Germany)	
Paul Millsap*	July 13	Denver Nuggets	Atlanta Hawks	
Otto Porter Jr. (RFA)	July 13	Washington Wizards		
Reggie Bullock	July 14	Detroit Pistons		
Gordon Hayward*	July 14	Boston Celtics	Utah Jazz	
David Nwaba	July 14	Chicago Bulls (claimed off waivers)	Los Angeles Lakers (waived on July 12)	
Brandon Paul	July 14	San Antonio Spurs	Anadolu Efes S.K. (Turkey)	
André Roberson (RFA)	July 14	Oklahoma City Thunder		
Anthony Tolliver	July 14	Detroit Pistons	Sacramento Kings (waived on June 1)	
Jonathon Simmons	July 15	Orlando Magic	San Antonio Spurs	
Tarik Black	July 17	Houston Rockets	Los Angeles Lakers (waived on July 1)	
Jonas Jerebko	July 17	Utah Jazz	Boston Celtics	
Joffrey Lauvergne	July 18	San Antonio Spurs	Chicago Bulls	
Kennedy Meeks	July 18	Toronto Raptors	North Carolina (undrafted in 2017)	
C. J. Miles*	July 18	Toronto Raptors (via sign and trade)	Indiana Pacers	
Thabo Sefolosha	July 18	Utah Jazz	Atlanta Hawks	
Aron Baynes*	July 19	Boston Celtics	Detroit Pistons	
Mario Chalmers	July 19	Memphis Grizzlies (Previously waived on March 10, 2016)		
Jamal Crawford	July 19	Minnesota Timberwolves	Atlanta Hawks (waived on July 7)	
Blake Griffin***	July 19	Los Angeles Clippers		
Luc Mbah a Moute*	July 19	Houston Rockets	Los Angeles Clippers	
Royce O'Neale	July 19	Utah Jazz	CB Gran Canaria (Spain)	
Udonis Haslem	July 20	Miami Heat		
Rajon Rondo	July 20	New Orleans Pelicans	Chicago Bulls (waived on June 30)	
Daniel Theis	July 20	Boston Celtics	Brose Bamberg (Germany)	
Nick Collison	July 21	Oklahoma City Thunder		
Dewayne Dedmon*	July 21	Atlanta Hawks	San Antonio Spurs	
Ersan İlyasova	July 21	Atlanta Hawks		
Ekpe Udoh	July 21	Utah Jazz	Fenerbahçe (Turkey)	
Nicolás Brussino	July 22	Atlanta Hawks (claimed off waivers)	Dallas Mavericks (waived on July 20)	
Pau Gasol*	July 24	San Antonio Spurs		
Matt Williams	July 24	Miami Heat	Central Florida (undrafted in 2017)	
Stephen Curry	July 25	Golden State Warriors		
Kevin Durant*	July 25	Golden State Warriors		
Andre Iguodala	July 25	Golden State Warriors		
Joe Ingles (RFA)	July 25	Utah Jazz		
Shaun Livingston	July 25	Golden State Warriors		
Mike Muscala	July 25	Atlanta Hawks		
Zaza Pachulia	July 25	Golden State Warriors		
Derrick Rose	July 25	Cleveland Cavaliers	New York Knicks	
David West	July 25	Golden State Warriors		
Troy Williams	July 25	Houston Rockets		
Tyler Ennis	July 26	Los Angeles Lakers		
Alan Williams (RFA)	July 26	Phoenix Suns		
Arron Afflalo	July 27	Orlando Magic	Sacramento Kings (waived on June 23)	
Khem Birch	July 27	Orlando Magic	Olympiacos B.C. (Greece)	
Darius Miller	July 27	New Orleans Pelicans	Brose Bamberg (Germany)	
Marreese Speights*	July 27	Orlando Magic	Los Angeles Clippers	
Shane Larkin	July 31	Boston Celtics	Saski Baskonia (Spain)	
Tony Snell (RFA)	July 31	Milwaukee Bucks		
Gian Clavell	August 1	Dallas Mavericks	Brujos de Guayama (Puerto Rico) (undrafted in 2017)	
JaVale McGee	August 1	Golden State Warriors		
Brandon Ashley	August 3	Dallas Mavericks	Alba Berlin (Germany)	
Ian Clark	August 3	New Orleans Pelicans	Golden State Warriors	
Willie Reed*	August 3	Los Angeles Clippers	Miami Heat	
Vander Blue	August 4	Los Angeles Lakers	Los Angeles D-Fenders (G League)	
Milton Doyle	August 4	Brooklyn Nets	Loyola (Illinois) (undrafted in 2017)	
Patty Mills	August 4	San Antonio Spurs		
Jeremy Senglin	August 4	Brooklyn Nets	Weber State (undrafted in 2017)	
Ron Baker (RFA)	August 7	New York Knicks		
Michael Beasley	August 8	New York Knicks	Milwaukee Bucks	
PJ Dozier	August 8	Dallas Mavericks	South Carolina (undrafted in 2017)	
Ramon Sessions**	August 8	New York Knicks	Charlotte Hornets	
Luke Babbitt	August 9	Atlanta Hawks	Miami Heat	
Stephen Zimmerman	August 9	Los Angeles Lakers	Orlando Magic (waived on July 4)	
V. J. Beachem	August 11	Los Angeles Lakers	Notre Dame (undrafted in 2017)	
Marcus Georges-Hunt	August 11	Minnesota Timberwolves	Orlando Magic (waived on July 31)	
Brianté Weber	August 14	Los Angeles Lakers	Charlotte Hornets (waived on July 28)	
Damien Wilkins	August 15	Indiana Pacers	Brujos de Guayama (Puerto Rico)	
Kyle Wiltjer	August 15	Toronto Raptors	Los Angeles Clippers (waived on July 15)	
Jamel Artis	August 18	New York Knicks	Pittsburgh (undrafted in 2017)	
Nigel Hayes	August 18	New York Knicks	Wisconsin (undrafted in 2017)	
Xavier Rathan-Mayes	August 18	New York Knicks	Florida State (undrafted in 2017)	
Jordan Mickey	August 20	Miami Heat	Boston Celtics (waived on July 14)	
Jeff Withey	August 21	Dallas Mavericks	Utah Jazz	
K. J. McDaniels**	August 22	Toronto Raptors	Brooklyn Nets	
London Perrantes	August 23	San Antonio Spurs	Virginia (undrafted in 2017)	
Julyan Stone	August 23	Charlotte Hornets	Umana Reyer Venezia (Italy)	
Manu Ginóbili	August 24	San Antonio Spurs		
Nerlens Noel (RFA)	August 28	Dallas Mavericks		
Maalik Wayns	August 28	Dallas Mavericks	Maccabi Rishon LeZion (Israel)	
James Blackmon Jr.	August 30	Philadelphia 76ers	Indiana (undrafted in 2017)	
Troy Caupain	August 31	Orlando Magic	Cincinnati (undrafted in 2017)	
Kalin Lucas	August 31	Orlando Magic	Erie BayHawks (G League)	
Larry Drew II	September 5	Miami Heat	Sioux Falls Skyforce (G League)	
Tyler Cavanaugh	September 6	Atlanta Hawks	George Washington (undrafted in 2017)	
Quinn Cook	September 6	Atlanta Hawks	New Orleans Pelicans (waived on July 25)	
James Young	September 6	Milwaukee Bucks	Boston Celtics	
DeQuan Jones	September 7	Indiana Pacers	Lille Métropole (France)	
Trey McKinney-Jones	September 7	Indiana Pacers	Fort Wayne Mad Ants (G League)	
Damjan Rudež	September 7	Orlando Magic		
Archie Goodwin	September 11	Portland Trail Blazers	Brooklyn Nets (waived on July 28)	
Josh Childress	September 12	Denver Nuggets	SAN-EN NeoPhoenix (Japan)	
Tyler Zeller	September 12	Brooklyn Nets	Boston Celtics (waived on July 2)	
Isaiah Briscoe	September 14	Portland Trail Blazers	Kentucky (undrafted in 2017)	
Naz Mitrou-Long	September 14	Utah Jazz	Iowa State (undrafted in 2017)	
Diamond Stone	September 14	Chicago Bulls	Atlanta Hawks (waived on July 31)	
Tony Allen	September 15	New Orleans Pelicans	Memphis Grizzlies	
Jarrett Jack	September 15	New York Knicks	New Orleans Pelicans	
Shabazz Muhammad	September 15	Minnesota Timberwolves		
Terry Henderson	September 18	Charlotte Hornets	NC State (undrafted in 2017)	
Amile Jefferson	September 18	Minnesota Timberwolves	Duke (undrafted in 2017)	
Erik McCree	September 18	Miami Heat	Louisiana Tech (undrafted in 2017)	
Anthony Morrow	September 18	Portland Trail Blazers	Chicago Bulls	
Luke Petrasek	September 18	Charlotte Hornets	Columbia (undrafted in 2017)	
Jason Terry	September 18	Milwaukee Bucks		
Melo Trimble	September 18	Minnesota Timberwolves	Maryland (undrafted in 2017)	
Andrew Bogut	September 19	Los Angeles Lakers	Cleveland Cavaliers (waived on March 13)	
Brandon Rush	September 19	Milwaukee Bucks	Minnesota Timberwolves	
Matt Jones	September 20	Sacramento Kings	Duke (undrafted in 2017)	
Mason Plumlee (RFA)	September 20	Denver Nuggets		
Aaron Brooks	September 21	Minnesota Timberwolves	Indiana Pacers	
Antonius Cleveland	September 21	Golden State Warriors	Southeast Missouri State (undrafted in 2017)	
Jeremy Evans	September 21	Atlanta Hawks	Khimki Moscow (Russia)	
Carrick Felix	September 21	Washington Wizards	Long Island Nets (G League)	
Michael Gbinije	September 21	Golden State Warriors	Detroit Pistons (waived on July 15)	
Alex Hamilton	September 21	Golden State Warriors	Santa Cruz Warriors (G League)	
Kendall Marshall	September 21	Milwaukee Bucks	Reno Bighorns (G League)	
Jordan Mathews	September 21	Atlanta Hawks	Gonzaga (undrafted in 2017)	
Georges Niang	September 21	Golden State Warriors	Indiana Pacers (waived on July 14)	
Donald Sloan	September 21	Washington Wizards	Guangdong Southern Tigers (China)	
Anthony Bennett	September 22	Phoenix Suns	Fenerbahçe (Turkey)	
Peter Jok	September 22	Phoenix Suns	Iowa (undrafted in 2017)	
Jacob Pullen	September 22	Philadelphia 76ers	Khimki Moscow (Russia)	
Kris Humphries	September 23	Philadelphia 76ers	Atlanta Hawks	
Jeremy Morgan	September 23	Memphis Grizzlies	Northern Iowa (undrafted in 2017)	
Emeka Okafor	September 23	Philadelphia 76ers	Phoenix Suns (Contract expired 2014)	
Bryce Alford	September 24	Oklahoma City Thunder	UCLA (undrafted in 2017)	
Joel Anthony	September 24	Milwaukee Bucks	San Antonio Spurs	
Markel Brown	September 24	Oklahoma City Thunder	Khimki Moscow (Russia)	
Isaiah Canaan	September 24	Oklahoma City Thunder	Chicago Bulls (waived on June 30)	
Gerald Green	September 24	Milwaukee Bucks	Boston Celtics	
Cliff Alexander	September 25	New Orleans Pelicans	Long Island Nets (G League)	
Bobby Brown	September 25	Houston Rockets		
Dante Cunningham*	September 25	New Orleans Pelicans		
Jarell Eddie	September 25	Chicago Bulls	Phoenix Suns	
John Jenkins	September 25	Atlanta Hawks	Westchester Knicks (G League)	
Chris Johnson	September 25	Houston Rockets	Rio Grande Valley Vipers (G League)	
Jaylen Johnson	September 25	Chicago Bulls	Louisville (undrafted in 2017)	
Perry Jones	September 25	New Orleans Pelicans	Iowa Energy (G League)	
Alex Len (RFA)	September 25	Phoenix Suns		
Akil Mitchell	September 25	Brooklyn Nets	Long Island Nets (G League)	
Landry Nnoko	September 25	Detroit Pistons	Victoria Libertas Pesaro (Italy)	
Kendrick Perkins	September 25	Cleveland Cavaliers	New Orleans Pelicans	
Andy Rautins	September 25	Toronto Raptors	Gaziantep (Turkey)	
Beno Udrih	September 25	Detroit Pistons		
Jarrod Uthoff	September 25	Indiana Pacers	Houston Rockets (waived on July 31)	
Martell Webster	September 25	New Orleans Pelicans	Washington Wizards (waived on November 30, 2015)	
Derek Willis	September 25	Detroit Pistons	Kentucky (undrafted in 2017)	
Taylor Braun	September 26	Utah Jazz	ratiopharm Ulm (Germany)	
Jonathan Holmes	September 26	Boston Celtics	Canton Charge (G League)	
Nikola Mirotić (RFA)	September 26	Chicago Bulls		
L. J. Peak	September 26	Boston Celtics	Georgetown (undrafted in 2017)	
Andrew White	September 26	Boston Celtics	Syracuse (undrafted in 2017)	
Devin Williams	September 26	Boston Celtics	Greensboro Swarm (G League)	
JaCorey Williams	September 26	Cleveland Cavaliers	Middle Tennessee (undrafted in 2017)	
Marcus Williams	September 26	Sacramento Kings	Cholet Basket (France)	
George de Paula	September 27	Houston Rockets	Paulistano (Brazil) (undrafted in 2017)	
JaMychal Green (RFA)	September 27	Memphis Grizzlies		
LaDontae Henton	September 27	Los Angeles Clippers	Alaska Aces (Philippines)	
Marshall Plumlee	September 27	Los Angeles Clippers	New York Knicks (waived on July 7)	
Dwyane Wade	September 27	Cleveland Cavaliers	Chicago Bulls (waived on Sept 25)	
Tyrone Wallace	September 27	Los Angeles Clippers	Salt Lake City Stars (G League)	
C. J. Williams	September 27	Los Angeles Clippers	Texas Legends (G League)	
Bronson Koenig	September 28	Chicago Bulls	Wisconsin (undrafted in 2017)	
Xavier Munford	October 5	Milwaukee Bucks	FC Barcelona Lassa (Spain)	
Durand Scott	October 5	Memphis Grizzlies	Enel Brindisi (Italy)	
Torian Graham	October 9	Utah Jazz	Arizona State (undrafted in 2017)	
Reggie Hearn	October 10	Sacramento Kings	Reno Bighorns (G League)	
David Stockton	October 10	Sacramento Kings	Reno Bighorns (G League)	
Trey Burke	October 11	New York Knicks	Washington Wizards	
Isaac Hamilton	October 11	Cleveland Cavaliers	UCLA (undrafted in 2017)	
Yannis Morin	October 11	Oklahoma City Thunder	STB Le Havre (France)	
Chris Wright	October 11	Oklahoma City Thunder	Oklahoma City Blue (G League)	
Tony Mitchell	October 12	Miami Heat	Sioux Falls Skyforce (G League)	
Tidjan Keita	October 13	Phoenix Suns	Cégep de Thetford (Canada) (undrafted in 2017)	
Kay Felder	October 16	Chicago Bulls (claimed off waivers)	Atlanta Hawks (waived on October 14)	
DeAndre Liggins	October 16	Milwaukee Bucks (claimed off waivers)	Miami Heat (waived on October 14)	
Isaiah Taylor	October 17	Atlanta Hawks	Houston Rockets (waived on October 13)	
Richard Jefferson	October 19	Denver Nuggets	Atlanta Hawks (waived on October 14)	
Jameer Nelson	October 22	New Orleans Pelicans	Denver Nuggets (waived on October 19)	
Isaiah Canaan	October 24	Houston Rockets	Oklahoma City Thunder (waived on October 14)	
Josh Smith	October 28	New Orleans Pelicans	Sichuan Blue Whales (China)	
Mike James****	December 7	Phoenix Suns (previously on a two-way contract)		
Isaiah Canaan	December 13	Phoenix Suns	Northern Arizona Suns (G League)	
Tyler Cavanaugh****	December 18	Atlanta Hawks (previously on a two-way contract)		
Gerald Green	December 28	Houston Rockets	Milwaukee Bucks (waived on October 14)	
Alex Poythress****	December 28	Indiana Pacers (previously on a two-way contract)		
Demetrius Jackson	January 6	Houston Rockets (previously on a two-way contract; signed 10-day contract)		
Joel Bolomboy****	January 7	Milwaukee Bucks (previously on a two-way contract)		
Sean Kilpatrick****	January 7	Milwaukee Bucks (previously on a two-way contract)		
DeAndre Liggins	January 10	New Orleans Pelicans (10-day contract)	Milwaukee Bucks (waived on January 7)	
Dwight Buycks****	January 12	Detroit Pistons (previously on a two-way contract)		
Kyle Collinsworth	January 13	Dallas Mavericks (previously on a two-way contract; signed 10-day contract)		
Trey Burke	January 14	New York Knicks	Westchester Knicks (G League)	
Nigel Hayes	January 19	Los Angeles Lakers (10-day contract)	Westchester Knicks (G League)	
Jarell Eddie	January 20	Boston Celtics (10-day contract)	Windy City Bulls (G League)	
DeAndre Liggins	January 20	New Orleans Pelicans (second 10-day contract)		
Larry Drew II	January 23	Philadelphia 76ers (10-day contract)	Sioux Falls Skyforce (G League)	
Kyle Collinsworth	January 24	Dallas Mavericks (second 10-day contract)		
Josh Gray	February 2	Phoenix Suns (10-day contract)	Northern Arizona Suns (G League)	
Emeka Okafor	February 3	New Orleans Pelicans (10-day contract)	Delaware 87ers (G League)	
DeAndre Liggins	February 5	New Orleans Pelicans (Second 10-day contract ended January 30, 2018; signed for multi-year contract)		
Kyle Collinsworth	February 8	Dallas Mavericks (Signed for rest of season)	Texas Legends (G League)	
Greg Monroe	February 8	Boston Celtics	Phoenix Suns (waived on February 1)	
Bobby Brown	February 10	Houston Rockets (Previously waived on January 5, 2018; signed for rest of season)		
Naz Mitrou-Long	February 11	Utah Jazz (10-day contract)	Salt Lake City Stars (G League)	
Marco Belinelli	February 12	Philadelphia 76ers	Atlanta Hawks (waived on February 9)	
Josh Gray	February 12	Phoenix Suns (second 10-day contract)		
Brandan Wright	February 12	Houston Rockets (Signed for rest of season)	Memphis Grizzlies (waived on February 10)	
Joe Johnson	February 14	Houston Rockets (Signed for rest of season)	Sacramento Kings (waived on February 11)	
Emeka Okafor	February 14	New Orleans Pelicans (second 10-day contract)		
Rashad Vaughn	February 20	Orlando Magic (10-day contract)	New Orleans Pelicans (waived on February 10)	
Shaquille Harrison	February 21	Phoenix Suns (10-day contract)	Northern Arizona Suns (G League)	
Walter Lemon Jr.	February 21	New Orleans Pelicans (10-day contract)	Fort Wayne Mad Ants (G League)	
Trey McKinney-Jones	February 21	Indiana Pacers (10-day contract)	Fort Wayne Mad Ants (G League)	
Brandon Rush	February 21	Portland Trail Blazers (10-day contract)	Milwaukee Bucks (waived on October 14)	
Troy Williams	February 21	New York Knicks (10-day contract)	Houston Rockets (waived on February 14)	
Antonius Cleveland	February 22	Atlanta Hawks (10-day contract)	Dallas Mavericks (waived on December 19)	
Marcus Thornton	February 22	Cleveland Cavaliers (10-day contract)	Canton Charge (G League)	
Ramon Sessions	February 23	Washington Wizards (10-day contract)	New York Knicks (waived on January 13)	
Naz Mitrou-Long	February 24	Utah Jazz (second 10-day contract)		
Scotty Hopson	February 26	Dallas Mavericks (10-day contract)	Galatasaray Odeabank (Turkey)	
Emeka Okafor	February 26	New Orleans Pelicans (Signed for rest of season)		
Ersan İlyasova	February 28	Philadelphia 76ers (Signed for rest of season)	Atlanta Hawks (waived on February 26)	
Jaylen Morris	February 28	Atlanta Hawks (10-day contract)	Erie BayHawks (G League)	
Jarell Eddie	March 1	Chicago Bulls (10-day contract)	Windy City Bulls (G League)	
Rashad Vaughn	March 2	Orlando Magic (second 10-day contract)		
Travis Wear	March 2	Los Angeles Lakers (10-day contract)	South Bay Lakers (G League)	
Trevor Booker	March 3	Indiana Pacers (Signed for rest of season)	Philadelphia 76ers (waived on February 28)	
Corey Brewer	March 3	Oklahoma City Thunder (Signed for rest of season)	Los Angeles Lakers (waived on February 28)	
Shaquille Harrison	March 3	Phoenix Suns (second 10-day contract)		
Troy Williams	March 3	New York Knicks (second 10-day contract)		
Antonius Cleveland	March 4	Atlanta Hawks (second 10-day contract)		
Sean Kilpatrick	March 4	Los Angeles Clippers (10-day contract)	Milwaukee Bucks (waived on March 2)	
Walter Lemon Jr.	March 4	New Orleans Pelicans (second 10-day contract)		
Shabazz Muhammad	March 4	Milwaukee Bucks (Signed for rest of season)	Minnesota Timberwolves (waived on March 1)	
Xavier Rathan-Mayes	March 5	Memphis Grizzlies (10-day contract)	Westchester Knicks (G League)	
Ramon Sessions	March 5	Washington Wizards (second 10-day contract)		
Nigel Hayes	March 6	Toronto Raptors (10-day contract)	Westchester Knicks (G League)	
Georgios Papagiannis	March 8	Portland Trail Blazers (10-day contract)	Sacramento Kings (waived on February 8)	
Rodney Purvis	March 8	Orlando Magic (10-day contract)	Lakeland Magic (G League)	
Derrick Rose	March 8	Minnesota Timberwolves (Signed for rest of season)	Utah Jazz (waived on February 10)	
Derrick Williams	March 9	Los Angeles Lakers (10-day contract)	Tianjin Gold Lions	
Brandon Jennings	March 11	Milwaukee Bucks (10-day contract)	Wisconsin Herd (G League)	
Jaylen Morris	March 11	Atlanta Hawks (second 10-day contract)		
Jameel Warney	March 11	Dallas Mavericks (10-day contract)	Texas Legends (G League)	
Wade Baldwin IV****	March 12	Portland Trail Blazers (previously on a two-way contract)		
Damion Lee	March 13	Atlanta Hawks (10-day contract)	Santa Cruz Warriors (G League)	
Shaquille Harrison	March 13	Phoenix Suns (Signed for multi-year contract)		
Troy Williams	March 13	New York Knicks (Signed for multi-year contract)		
Travis Wear	March 13	Los Angeles Lakers (second 10-day contract)		
Antonius Cleveland	March 14	Atlanta Hawks (Signed for multi-year contract)		
Sean Kilpatrick	March 14	Los Angeles Clippers (second 10-day contract)		
Brianté Weber	March 14	Memphis Grizzlies (10-day contract)	Sioux Falls Skyforce (G League)	
Larry Drew II	March 15	New Orleans Pelicans (10-day contract)	Sioux Falls Skyforce (G League)	
Nigel Hayes	March 16	Toronto Raptors (second 10-day contract)		
Ramon Sessions	March 16	Washington Wizards (Signed for rest of season)		
David Stockton	March 17	Utah Jazz (10-day contract)	Reno Bighorns (G League)	
Georgios Papagiannis	March 18	Portland Trail Blazers (Signed for multi-year contract)		
Rodney Purvis	March 18	Orlando Magic (second 10-day contract)		
Okaro White	March 18	Cleveland Cavaliers (10-day contract)	Atlanta Hawks (waived on February 8)	
Brandon Jennings	March 21	Milwaukee Bucks (second 10-day contract)		
Jaylen Morris	March 21	Atlanta Hawks (Signed for multi-year contract)		
Aaron Harrison	March 22	Dallas Mavericks (10-day contract)	Reno Bighorns (G League)	
Damion Lee	March 23	Atlanta Hawks (second 10-day contract)		
Travis Wear	March 23	Los Angeles Lakers (Signed for rest of season)		
Le'Bryan Nash	March 23	Houston Rockets (10-day contract)	Busan KT Sonicboom (South Korea)	
Jaylen Johnson	March 24	Chicago Bulls (Signed for rest of season)	Windy City Bulls (G League)	
Marquis Teague	March 24	Memphis Grizzlies (10-day contract)	Memphis Hustle (G League)	
C.J. Fair	March 25	Chicago Bulls (Signed for rest of season)	Windy City Bulls (G League)	
Larry Drew II	March 26	New Orleans Pelicans (second 10-day contract)		
Sean Kilpatrick	March 26	Chicago Bulls (Signed for multi-year contract)	Los Angeles Clippers (Second 10-day contract ended March 24)	
David Stockton	March 27	Utah Jazz (second 10-day contract)		
MarShon Brooks	March 27	Memphis Grizzlies (10-day contract)	Jiangsu Dragons (China)	
Rodney Purvis	March 28	Orlando Magic (Signed for rest of season)		
Xavier Silas	March 28	Boston Celtics (10-day contract)	Northern Arizona Suns (G League)	
Tim Quarterman	March 30	Houston Rockets (Signed for multi-year contract)	Agua Caliente Clippers (G League)	
Nigel Hayes	March 31	Sacramento Kings (Signed for rest of season)	Westchester Knicks (G League)	
Aaron Harrison	April 1	Dallas Mavericks (Signed for rest of season)		
Brandon Jennings	April 1	Milwaukee Bucks (Signed for multi-year contract)		
Jeremy Evans	April 1	Atlanta Hawks (10-day contract)	Erie BayHawks (G League)	
Damion Lee	April 2	Atlanta Hawks (Signed for rest of season)		
Marquis Teague	April 3	Memphis Grizzlies (Signed for rest of season)		
Jordan Crawford	April 5	New Orleans Pelicans (Signed for rest of season | Previously waived on October 22)		
MarShon Brooks	April 6	Memphis Grizzlies (Signed for multi-year contract)		
David Stockton	April 6	Utah Jazz (Signed for rest of season)		
Jonathan Gibson	April 6	Boston Celtics (Signed for rest of season)	Qingdao DoubleStar Eagles (China)	
Omari Johnson	April 6	Memphis Grizzlies (Signed for multi-year contract)	Memphis Hustle (G League)	
Okaro White	April 7	Cleveland Cavaliers (Signed for rest of season | 10-day contract ended March 28)		
Andre Ingram	April 9	Los Angeles Lakers (Signed for rest of season)	South Bay Lakers (G League)	
C. J. Williams****	April 9	Los Angeles Clippers (previously on a two-way contract)		
Quinn Cook****	April 10	Golden State Warriors (previously on a two-way contract)		
Lorenzo Brown****	April 11	Toronto Raptors (previously on a two-way contract)		
Amile Jefferson****	April 11	Minnesota Timberwolves (previously on a two-way contract)		
Aaron Jackson	April 11	Houston Rockets (Signed for rest of season)	Beijing Ducks (China)	
Kendrick Perkins	April 11	Cleveland Cavaliers (Signed for rest of season)	Canton Charge (G League)	
Ty Lawson	April 12	Washington Wizards (Signed for the playoffs)	Shandong Golden Stars (China)	
Mike Dunleavy Jr.			Atlanta Hawks (waived on June 30)	
Monta Ellis			Indiana Pacers (waived on July 5)	
Festus Ezeli			Portland Trail Blazers (waived on June 30)	
Randy Foye			Brooklyn Nets	
Spencer Hawes			Milwaukee Bucks (waived on September 1)	
Gerald Henderson Jr.			Philadelphia 76ers (waived on June 30)	
Roy Hibbert			Denver Nuggets	
Jordan Hill			Minnesota Timberwolves (waived on June 26)	
Dahntay Jones			Cleveland Cavaliers	
Nikola Peković			Minnesota Timberwolves (waived on June 20)	
Ronnie Price			Phoenix Suns	
Deron Williams			Cleveland Cavaliers	

* Player option
** Team option
*** Early termination option
**** Converted two-way contract to full contract

=== Going to other North American leagues ===
*	Denotes G-League players who returned to their former team

Player	Date signed	New team	New league	NBA team	NBA contract status	Ref
Kendrick Perkins	October 15	Canton Charge	NBA G League	Cleveland Cavaliers	Unrestricted free agent	
Emeka Okafor	October 15	Delaware 87ers	NBA G League	Philadelphia 76ers	Unrestricted free agent	
Derrick Jones Jr.*	December 12	Northern Arizona Suns	NBA G League	Phoenix Suns	Unrestricted free agent	
Isaiah Canaan	December 12	Northern Arizona Suns	NBA G League	Houston Rockets	Unrestricted free agent	
Archie Goodwin*	December 13	Greensboro Swarm	NBA G League	Portland Trail Blazers	Unrestricted free agent	
K. J. McDaniels	December 13	Grand Rapids Drive	NBA G League	Toronto Raptors	Unrestricted free agent	
Marcus Thornton	December 13	Grand Rapids Drive	NBA G League	Brooklyn Nets	Unrestricted free agent	
Alonzo Gee	December 16	Sioux Falls Skyforce	NBA G League	Denver Nuggets	Unrestricted free agent	
Matt Williams*	January 2	Sioux Falls Skyforce	NBA G League	Miami Heat	Unrestricted free agent	
Michael Young*	January 6	Northern Arizona Suns	NBA G League	Washington Wizards	Unrestricted free agent	
Joel Bolomboy*	January 10	Wisconsin Herd	NBA G League	Milwaukee Bucks	Unrestricted free agent	
Naz Mitrou-Long*	January 16	Salt Lake City Stars	NBA G League	Utah Jazz	Unrestricted free agent	
Yakuba Ouattara*	January 17	Long Island Nets	NBA G League	Brooklyn Nets	Unrestricted free agent	
Jamil Wilson	January 18	Fort Wayne Mad Ants	NBA G League	Los Angeles Clippers	Unrestricted free agent	
Brianté Weber*	January 22	Sioux Falls Skyforce	NBA G League	Houston Rockets	Unrestricted free agent	
James Michael McAdoo	January 26	Agua Caliente Clippers	NBA G League	Philadelphia 76ers	Unrestricted free agent	
Luis Montero*	January 27	Reno Bighorns	NBA G League	Detroit Pistons	Unrestricted free agent	
Nigel Hayes*	January 30	Westchester Knicks	NBA G League	Los Angeles Lakers	Unrestricted free agent	
Jarell Eddie*	January 31	Windy City Bulls	NBA G League	Boston Celtics	Unrestricted free agent	
Damien Wilkins*	February 1	Greensboro Swarm	NBA G League	Indiana Pacers	Unrestricted free agent	
Larry Drew II*	February 2	Sioux Falls Skyforce	NBA G League	Philadelphia 76ers	Unrestricted free agent	
Kyle Collinsworth*	February 3	Texas Legends	NBA G League	Dallas Mavericks	Unrestricted free agent	
Alan Anderson	February 10	Lakeland Magic	NBA G League	Los Angeles Clippers	Unrestricted free agent	
Josh Gray*	February 21	Northern Arizona Suns	NBA G League	Phoenix Suns	Unrestricted free agent	
Trey McKinney-Jones*	March 3	Fort Wayne Mad Ants	NBA G League	Indiana Pacers	Unrestricted free agent	
Marcus Thornton*	March 4	Canton Charge	NBA G League	Cleveland Cavaliers	Unrestricted free agent	
Naz Mitrou-Long*	March 6	Salt Lake City Stars	NBA G League	Utah Jazz	Unrestricted free agent	
Jarell Eddie*	March 10	Windy City Bulls	NBA G League	Chicago Bulls	Unrestricted free agent	
Walter Lemon Jr.*	March 14	Fort Wayne Mad Ants	NBA G League	New Orleans Pelicans	Unrestricted free agent	
Xavier Rathan-Mayes*	March 14	Westchester Knicks	NBA G League	Memphis Grizzlies	Unrestricted free agent	
Jameel Warney*	March 21	Texas Legends	NBA G League	Dallas Mavericks	Unrestricted free agent	
Nigel Hayes*	March 26	Westchester Knicks	NBA G League	Toronto Raptors	Unrestricted free agent	

=== Going overseas ===
*	Denotes international players who returned to their home country

Player	Date signed	New team	New country	NBA team	NBA contract status	Ref
Luis Scola	July 9	Shanxi Brave Dragons	China	Brooklyn Nets	Unrestricted free agent	
Pierre Jackson	July 14	Maccabi Tel Aviv	Israel	Dallas Mavericks	Unrestricted free agent	
Sergio Rodríguez	July 17	CSKA Moscow	Russia	Philadelphia 76ers	Unrestricted free agent	
Justin Hamilton	July 22	Beijing Ducks	China	Toronto Raptors	Unrestricted free agent	
Brian Roberts	July 23	Olympiacos Piraeus	Greece	Charlotte Hornets	Unrestricted free agent	
Marcelo Huertas	July 25	Saski Baskonia	Spain	Houston Rockets	Unrestricted free agent	
Axel Toupane	July 27	Žalgiris Kaunas	Lithuania	New Orleans Pelicans	Unrestricted free agent	
Brandon Jennings	July 28	Shanxi Brave Dragons	China	Washington Wizards	Unrestricted free agent	
Terrence Jones	July 31	Qingdao DoubleStar Eagles	China	Milwaukee Bucks	Unrestricted free agent	
Kevin Séraphin	August 4	FC Barcelona	Spain	Indiana Pacers	Unrestricted free agent	
Ty Lawson	August 9	Shandong Golden Stars	China	Sacramento Kings	Unrestricted free agent	
Donatas Motiejūnas	August 9	Shandong Golden Stars	China	New Orleans Pelicans	Unrestricted free agent	
Hollis Thompson	August 10	Olympiacos Piraeus	Greece	New Orleans Pelicans	Unrestricted free agent	
Christian Wood**	August 10	Fujian SBS Sturgeons	China	Charlotte Hornets	Unrestricted free agent	
Norris Cole	August 15	Maccabi Tel Aviv	Israel	Oklahoma City Thunder	Unrestricted free agent	
Rakeem Christmas	August 17	Galatasaray Odeabank	Turkey	Indiana Pacers	Unrestricted free agent	
Jordan McRae	August 20	Saski Baskonia	Spain	Cleveland Cavaliers	Unrestricted free agent	
Brandon Bass	August 22	Liaoning Flying Leopards	China	Los Angeles Clippers	Unrestricted free agent	
Carl Landry	August 26	Jilin Northeast Tigers	China	Philadelphia 76ers	Unrestricted free agent	
Ben Bentil	August 28	Champagne Châlons-Reims Basket	France	Dallas Mavericks	Unrestricted free agent	
Sasha Vujačić	August 29	Auxilium Pallacanestro Torino	Italy	New York Knicks	Unrestricted free agent	
Patricio Garino	September 1	Saski Baskonia	Spain	Orlando Magic	Unrestricted free agent	
Andrew Nicholson	September 5	Guangdong Southern Tigers	China	Portland Trail Blazers	Unrestricted free agent	
Ryan Kelly	September 12	Real Betis Energía Plus	Spain	Houston Rockets	Unrestricted free agent	
Jared Sullinger	September 12	Shenzhen Leopards	China	Toronto Raptors	Unrestricted free agent	
Boris Diaw*	September 17	Levallois Metropolitans	France	Utah Jazz	Unrestricted free agent	
Thomas Robinson	September 23	Khimki	Russia	Los Angeles Lakers	Unrestricted free agent	
Dorell Wright	October 3	Igokea	Bosnia and Herzegovina	Los Angeles Clippers	Unrestricted free agent	
Chasson Randle	October 7	Real Madrid	Spain	New York Knicks	Unrestricted free agent	
Josh Childress	October 21	Adelaide 36ers	Australia	Denver Nuggets	Unrestricted free agent	
Andy Rautins	October 24	Banvit	Turkey	Toronto Raptors	Unrestricted free agent	
Maalik Wayns	October 25	Joventut Badalona	Spain	Dallas Mavericks	Unrestricted free agent	
Damjan Rudež	October 26	Valencia Basket	Spain	Orlando Magic	Unrestricted free agent	
Kyle Wiltjer	October 29	Olympiacos B.C.	Greece	Toronto Raptors	Unrestricted free agent	
Isaiah Briscoe	November 3	BC Kalev/Cramo	Estonia	Portland Trail Blazers	Unrestricted free agent	
John Jenkins	November 7	San Pablo Burgos	Spain	Atlanta Hawks	Unrestricted free agent	
Leandro Barbosa*	November 17	Franca Basquetebol Clube	Brazil	Phoenix Suns	Unrestricted free agent	
Lavoy Allen	November 27	Zhejiang Golden Bulls	China	Indiana Pacers	Unrestricted free agent	
Rade Zagorac	November 28	CB Sevilla	Spain	Memphis Grizzlies	Unrestricted free agent	
Maurice Ndour	November 29	UNICS Kazan	Russia	New York Knicks	Unrestricted free agent	
Semaj Christon	December 2	Guangzhou Long-Lions	China	Oklahoma City Thunder	Unrestricted free agent	
Carrick Felix	December 22	Melbourne United	Australia	Washington Wizards	Unrestricted free agent	
Beno Udrih	December 24	Žalgiris Kaunas	Lithuania	Detroit Pistons	Unrestricted free agent	
Derrick Williams	December 29	Tianjin Gold Lions	China	Cleveland Cavaliers	Unrestricted free agent	
Toney Douglas	December 29	Anadolu Efes	Turkey	Memphis Grizzlies	Unrestricted free agent	
Nicolás Brussino	December 31	Herbalife Gran Canaria	Spain	Atlanta Hawks	Unrestricted free agent	
Mindaugas Kuzminskas	December 31	Pallacanestro Olimpia Milano	Italy	New York Knicks	Unrestricted free agent	
Tim Quarterman	January 2	Jiangsu Dragons	China	Houston Rockets	Unrestricted free agent	
Jacob Pullen	January 7	Mahram Tehran	Iran	Philadelphia 76ers	Unrestricted free agent	
Gian Clavell	January 15	Sakarya	Turkey	Dallas Mavericks	Unrestricted free agent	
Nate Wolters	January 17	Élan Chalon	France	Utah Jazz	Unrestricted free agent	
Anderson Varejão*	January 17	Flamengo	Brazil	Golden State Warriors	Unrestricted free agent	
Vince Hunter	January 23	AEK B.C.	Greece	Memphis Grizzlies	Unrestricted free agent	
Eric Griffin	January 26	Hapoel Eilat	Israel	Utah Jazz	Unrestricted free agent	
Vander Blue	February 2	Fiat Torino	Italy	Los Angeles Lakers	Unrestricted free agent	
Adreian Payne	February 5	Panathinaikos	Greece	Orlando Magic	Unrestricted free agent	
Mike James	February 13	Panathinaikos	Greece	New Orleans Pelicans	Unrestricted free agent	
C. J. Watson	February 18	Muratbey Uşak Sportif	Turkey	Orlando Magic	Unrestricted free agent	
Bobby Brown	February 22	Olympiacos Piraeus	Greece	Houston Rockets	Unrestricted free agent	
Joel Anthony	February 27	San Lorenzo	Argentina	San Antonio Spurs	Unrestricted free agent	
Jacob Wiley	March 4	MHP Riesen Ludwigsburg	Germany	Brooklyn Nets	Unrestricted free agent	
Andrew Bogut*	April 24	Sydney Kings	Australia	Los Angeles Lakers	Unrestricted free agent	

=== Waived ===
Player	Date Waived	Former Team	Ref
Anthony Tolliver	June 1	Sacramento Kings	
Nikola Peković	June 20	Minnesota Timberwolves	
Arron Afflalo	June 23	Sacramento Kings	
Jordan Hill	June 26	Minnesota Timberwolves	
Paul Pierce	June 28	Los Angeles Clippers	
Darrun Hilliard	June 29	Los Angeles Clippers	
Isaiah Canaan	June 30	Chicago Bulls	
Mike Dunleavy Jr.	June 30	Atlanta Hawks	
Festus Ezeli	June 30	Portland Trail Blazers	
Gerald Henderson Jr.	June 30	Philadelphia 76ers	
Maurice Ndour	June 30	New York Knicks	
Rajon Rondo	June 30	Chicago Bulls	
Tarik Black	July 1	Los Angeles Lakers	
Tyler Zeller	July 2	Boston Celtics	
Leandro Barbosa	July 3	Phoenix Suns	
Chris Bosh	July 4	Miami Heat	
Stephen Zimmerman	July 4	Orlando Magic	
Monta Ellis	July 5	Indiana Pacers	
Rakeem Christmas	July 6	Indiana Pacers	
Jamal Crawford	July 7	Atlanta Hawks	
Ryan Kelly	July 7	Houston Rockets	
Marshall Plumlee	July 7	New York Knicks	
C. J. Watson	July 10	Orlando Magic	
Mike Miller	July 11	Denver Nuggets	
David Nwaba	July 12	Los Angeles Lakers	
Boris Diaw	July 13	Utah Jazz	
Justin Hamilton	July 14	Toronto Raptors	
Jordan Mickey	July 14	Boston Celtics	
Georges Niang	July 14	Indiana Pacers	
Michael Gbinije	July 15	Detroit Pistons	
Demetrius Jackson	July 15	Boston Celtics	
Kyle Wiltjer	July 15	Los Angeles Clippers	
Nicolás Brussino	July 20	Dallas Mavericks	
Quinn Cook	July 25	New Orleans Pelicans	
Axel Toupane	July 25	New Orleans Pelicans	
Archie Goodwin	July 28	Brooklyn Nets	
Brianté Weber	July 28	Charlotte Hornets	
Marcus Georges-Hunt	July 31	Orlando Magic	
Diamond Stone	July 31	Atlanta Hawks	
Kevin Séraphin	July 31	Indiana Pacers	
Patricio Garino	August 1	Orlando Magic	
Andrew Nicholson	August 30	Portland Trail Blazers	
Spencer Hawes	September 1	Milwaukee Bucks	
Jalen Moore^{†}	September 10	Milwaukee Bucks	
Bronson Koenig^{†}	September 21	Milwaukee Bucks	
JeQuan Lewis	September 22	Milwaukee Bucks	
DeAndre Liggins	September 25	Atlanta Hawks	
Chasson Randle	September 25	New York Knicks	
Dwyane Wade	September 25	Chicago Bulls	
Richard Jefferson	October 14	Atlanta Hawks	
Kay Felder	October 14	Atlanta Hawks	
Jameer Nelson	October 19	Denver Nuggets	
Jordan Crawford	October 22	New Orleans Pelicans	
Isaiah Canaan	October 28	Houston Rockets	
Carrick Felix	November 2	Washington Wizards	
Josh Smith	November 10	New Orleans Pelicans	
Mindaugas Kuzminskas	November 12	New York Knicks	
Gian Clavell^{†}	November 17	Dallas Mavericks	
Derrick Jones Jr.	December 7	Phoenix Suns	
Sean Kilpatrick	December 7	Brooklyn Nets	
Nicolás Brussino	December 8	Atlanta Hawks	
Yakuba Ouattara^{†}	December 17	Brooklyn Nets	
Gary Payton II^{†}	December 18	Milwaukee Bucks	
Antonius Cleveland^{†}	December 19	Dallas Mavericks	
Jeff Withey	December 19	Dallas Mavericks	
Kay Felder	December 19	Chicago Bulls	
Eric Griffin^{†}	December 21	Utah Jazz	
Mike James	December 22	Phoenix Suns	
Nate Wolters^{†}	December 22	Utah Jazz	
Matt Williams^{†}	December 31	Miami Heat	
Michael Young^{†}	January 3	Washington Wizards	
Jacob Pullen^{†}	January 4	Philadelphia 76ers	
Bobby Brown	January 5	Houston Rockets	
Jamil Wilson^{†}	January 5	Los Angeles Clippers	
Andrew Bogut	January 6	Los Angeles Lakers	
Demetrius Jackson^{†}	January 6	Houston Rockets	
Joel Bolomboy^{†}	January 7	Milwaukee Bucks	
DeAndre Liggins	January 7	Milwaukee Bucks	
Damien Wilkins	January 7	Indiana Pacers	
Jalen Jones^{†}	January 8	New Orleans Pelicans	
Kyle Collinsworth^{†}	January 11	Dallas Mavericks	
Vander Blue^{†}	January 12	Los Angeles Lakers	
Ramon Sessions	January 13	New York Knicks	
Vince Hunter^{†}	January 13	Memphis Grizzlies	
Naz Mitrou-Long^{†}	January 13	Utah Jazz	
Luis Montero^{†}	January 13	Detroit Pistons	
James Michael McAdoo^{†}	January 15	Philadelphia 76ers	
Brianté Weber^{†}	January 15	Houston Rockets	
Jacob Wiley^{†}	January 15	Brooklyn Nets	
Adreian Payne^{†}	January 26	Orlando Magic	
Greg Monroe	February 1	Phoenix Suns	
Quincy Pondexter	February 1	Chicago Bulls	
Isaiah Canaan	February 8	Phoenix Suns	
A. J. Hammons	February 8	Miami Heat	
Johnny O'Bryant III	February 8	New York Knicks	
Georgios Papagiannis	February 8	Sacramento Kings	
Willie Reed	February 8	Chicago Bulls	
Okaro White	February 8	Atlanta Hawks	
Tony Allen	February 9	Chicago Bulls	
Marco Belinelli	February 9	Atlanta Hawks	
Sheldon Mac	February 9	Atlanta Hawks	
Derrick Rose	February 10	Utah Jazz	
Rashad Vaughn	February 10	New Orleans Pelicans	
Mike James	February 10	New Orleans Pelicans	
Brandan Wright	February 10	Memphis Grizzlies	
Bobby Brown	February 10	Houston Rockets	
Joe Johnson	February 11	Sacramento Kings	
Josh McRoberts	February 11	Dallas Mavericks	
Troy Williams	February 14	Houston Rockets	
Josh Gray	February 21	Phoenix Suns	
Ersan İlyasova	February 26	Atlanta Hawks	
Corey Brewer	February 28	Los Angeles Lakers	
Trevor Booker	February 28	Philadelphia 76ers	
Shabazz Muhammad	March 1	Minnesota Timberwolves	
Sean Kilpatrick	March 2	Milwaukee Bucks	
Rashad Vaughn	March 7	Orlando Magic	
Mirza Teletović	March 10	Milwaukee Bucks	
Brandan Wright	March 23	Houston Rockets	
Jaylen Johnson	March 25	Chicago Bulls	
C.J. Fair	March 26	Chicago Bulls	
Brice Johnson	March 27	Memphis Grizzlies	
James Young^{†}	March 27	Philadelphia 76ers	
Le'Bryan Nash	March 30	Houston Rockets	
Marquis Teague	April 6	Memphis Grizzlies	
Omri Casspi	April 7	Golden State Warriors	
Tim Quarterman	April 11	Houston Rockets	

- † Two-way contract

==== Training camp cuts ====
All players listed did not make the final roster.

Atlanta Hawks	Boston Celtics	Brooklyn Nets	Charlotte Hornets	Chicago Bulls
Tyler Cavanaugh; Quinn Cook; Jeremy Evans; John Jenkins; Jordan Mathews	Daniel Dixon; Jonathan Holmes; Daniel Ochefu; L. J. Peak; Andrew White III; Devin Williams	Milton Doyle; Tahjere McCall; Akil Mitchell; Kamari Murphy; Jeremy Senglin	Terry Henderson; Isaiah Hicks; Luke Petrasek; T. J. Williams	Jarell Eddie; Jaylen Johnson; Bronson Koenig; Diamond Stone
Cleveland Cavaliers	Dallas Mavericks	Denver Nuggets	Detroit Pistons	Golden State Warriors
Isaac Hamilton; Kendrick Perkins; Walter Tavares; JaCorey Williams	Brandon Ashley; PJ Dozier; Jameel Warney; Maalik Wayns	Josh Childress	Landry Nnoko; Beno Udrih; Derek Willis	Antonius Cleveland; Michael Gbinije; Alex Hamilton; Georges Niang; Trevor Thompson
Houston Rockets	Indiana Pacers	Los Angeles Clippers	Los Angeles Lakers	Memphis Grizzlies
George de Paula; Danuel House; Chris Johnson; Shawn Long; Cameron Oliver; Tim Quarterman; Isaiah Taylor	DeQuan Jones; Trey McKinney-Jones; Ben Moore; Jarrod Uthoff	LaDontae Henton; Marshall Plumlee; Tyrone Wallace	V. J. Beachem; Vander Blue; Travis Wear; Brianté Weber; Stephen Zimmerman	Wade Baldwin IV; Jeremy Morgan; Durand Scott; Rade Zagorac
Miami Heat	Milwaukee Bucks	Minnesota Timberwolves	New Orleans Pelicans	New York Knicks
Larry Drew II; DeAndre Liggins; Erik McCree; Tony Mitchell	Joel Anthony; Gerald Green; Kendall Marshall; Xavier Munford; Gary Payton II; Brandon Rush; James Young	Amile Jefferson; Melo Trimble; Shawne Williams	Cliff Alexander; Perry Jones; Martell Webster	Jamel Artis; Trey Burke; Nigel Hayes; Xavier Rathan-Mayes
Oklahoma City Thunder	Orlando Magic	Philadelphia 76ers	Phoenix Suns	Portland Trail Blazers
Bryce Alford; Markel Brown; Isaiah Canaan; Semaj Christon; Yannis Morin; Rashawn Thomas; Chris Wright	Troy Caupain; Kalin Lucas; Rodney Purvis; Damjan Rudež	Andrew Andrews; James Blackmon Jr.; Kris Humphries; Marc Loving; Emeka Okafor; James Webb III	Anthony Bennett; Peter Jok; Tidjan Keita; Elijah Millsap	Isaiah Briscoe; Archie Goodwin; Anthony Morrow
Sacramento Kings	San Antonio Spurs	Toronto Raptors	Utah Jazz	Washington Wizards
Reggie Hearn; Matt Jones; David Stockton; Marcus Williams	Amida Brimah; London Perrantes	Davion Berry; Kennedy Meeks; Andy Rautins; Kyle Wiltjer	Joel Bolomboy; Taylor Braun; Torian Graham; Naz Mitrou-Long; Kendall Pollard	Daniel Ochefu; Donald Sloan

== Draft ==
=== First round ===
Pick	Player	Date signed	Team	Ref
1	Markelle Fultz	July 8	Philadelphia 76ers	
2	Lonzo Ball	July 3	Los Angeles Lakers	
3	Jayson Tatum	July 1	Boston Celtics	
4	Josh Jackson	July 3	Phoenix Suns	
5	De'Aaron Fox	July 7	Sacramento Kings	
6	Jonathan Isaac	July 1	Orlando Magic	
7	Lauri Markkanen	July 5	Chicago Bulls	
8	Frank Ntilikina	July 5	New York Knicks	
9	Dennis Smith Jr.	July 5	Dallas Mavericks	
10	Zach Collins	July 3	Portland Trail Blazers	
11	Malik Monk	July 2	Charlotte Hornets	
12	Luke Kennard	July 1	Detroit Pistons	
13	Donovan Mitchell	July 5	Utah Jazz	
14	Bam Adebayo	July 1	Miami Heat	
15	Justin Jackson	July 6	Sacramento Kings	
16	Justin Patton	July 4	Minnesota Timberwolves	
17	D. J. Wilson	July 6	Milwaukee Bucks	
18	T. J. Leaf	July 1	Indiana Pacers	
19	John Collins	July 1	Atlanta Hawks	
20	Harry Giles	July 3	Sacramento Kings	
21	Terrance Ferguson	July 29	Oklahoma City Thunder	
22	Jarrett Allen	July 20	Brooklyn Nets	
23	OG Anunoby	July 7	Toronto Raptors	
24	Tyler Lydon	July 6	Denver Nuggets	
25	Anžejs Pasečņiks	—	Philadelphia 76ers	
26	Caleb Swanigan	July 3	Portland Trail Blazers	
27	Kyle Kuzma	July 3	Los Angeles Lakers	
28	Tony Bradley	July 5	Utah Jazz	
29	Derrick White	July 6	San Antonio Spurs	
30	Josh Hart	July 3	Los Angeles Lakers	

=== Second round ===
Pick	Player	Date signed	Team	Ref
31	Frank Jackson	July 11	New Orleans Pelicans	
32	Davon Reed	July 6	Phoenix Suns	
33	Wesley Iwundu	July 25	Orlando Magic	
34	Frank Mason III	July 12	Sacramento Kings	
35	Ivan Rabb	September 21	Memphis Grizzlies	
36	Jonah Bolden	—	Philadelphia 76ers	
37	Semi Ojeleye	July 18	Boston Celtics	
38	Jordan Bell	July 8	Golden State Warriors	
39	Jawun Evans	July 18	Los Angeles Clippers	
40	Dwayne Bacon	July 6	Charlotte Hornets	
41	Tyler Dorsey	July 14	Atlanta Hawks	
42	Thomas Bryant	July 30	Los Angeles Lakers	
43	Isaiah Hartenstein	—	Houston Rockets	
44	Damyean Dotson	August 7	New York Knicks	
45	Dillon Brooks	July 21	Memphis Grizzlies	
46	Sterling Brown	July 8	Milwaukee Bucks	
47	Ike Anigbogu	July 12	Indiana Pacers	
48	Sindarius Thornwell	July 18	Los Angeles Clippers	
49	Vlatko Čančar	—	Denver Nuggets	
50	Mathias Lessort	—	Philadelphia 76ers	
51	Monté Morris	July 21	Denver Nuggets	
52	Edmond Sumner	July 5	Indiana Pacers	
53	Kadeem Allen	July 19	Boston Celtics	
54	Alec Peters	September 18	Phoenix Suns	
55	Nigel Williams-Goss	—	Utah Jazz	
56	Jabari Bird	September 5	Boston Celtics	
57	Aleksandar Vezenkov	—	Brooklyn Nets	
58	Ognjen Jaramaz	—	New York Knicks	
59	Jaron Blossomgame	—	San Antonio Spurs	
60	Alpha Kaba	—	Atlanta Hawks	

=== Previous years' draftees ===
Draft	Pick	Player	Date signed	Team	Previous team	Ref
2016	23	Ante Žižić	July 1	Boston Celtics	Darüşşafaka Doğuş (Turkey)	
2016	26	Furkan Korkmaz	July 4	Philadelphia 76ers	Anadolu Efes (Turkey)	
2016	43	Zhou Qi	July 6	Houston Rockets	Xinjiang Flying Tigers (China)	
2014	27	Bogdan Bogdanović	July 13	Sacramento Kings	Fenerbahçe (Turkey)	
2016	58	Abdel Nader	July 15	Boston Celtics	Maine Red Claws (NBA G League)	
2016	35	Rade Zagorac	July 17	Memphis Grizzlies	Mega Bemax (Serbia)	
2015	31	Cedi Osman	July 18	Cleveland Cavaliers	Anadolu Efes (Turkey)	
2016	16	Guerschon Yabusele	July 20	Boston Celtics	Maine Red Claws (NBA G League)	
2015	48	Dakari Johnson	July 22	Oklahoma City Thunder	Oklahoma City Blue (NBA G League)	
2016	56	Daniel Hamilton	August 3	Oklahoma City Thunder	Oklahoma City Blue (NBA G League)	

=== Renounced draft rights ===
Draft	Pick	Player	Date of rights' renouncement	Former team	Ref
2015	45	Marcus Thornton	June 26	Boston Celtics	
2016	60	Tyrone Wallace	July 18	Utah Jazz	
1995	51	Dejan Bodiroga	July 22	Sacramento Kings	
2011	58	Ater Majok	September 13	New Orleans Pelicans	

== Two-way contracts ==
Per recently implemented NBA rules, teams are permitted to have two two-way players on their roster at any given time, in addition to their 15-man regular season roster. A two-way player will provide services primarily to the team's G League affiliate, but can spend up to 45 days with the parent NBA team. Only players with four or fewer years of NBA experience are able to sign two-way contracts, which can be for either one season or two. Players entering training camp for a team have a chance to convert their training camp deal into a two-way contract if they prove themselves worthy enough for it. Teams also have the option to convert a two-way contract into a regular, minimum-salary NBA contract, at which point the player becomes a regular member of the parent NBA team. Two-way players are not eligible for NBA playoff rosters, so a team must convert any two-way players it wants to use in the playoffs. Two-way contracts must be signed prior to January 15, with their salaries being fully guaranteed on January 20. Every team would sign a two-way player at least twice throughout this season.

Player	Date signed	Team	School / Club team	Ref
Kobi Simmons	July 1	Memphis Grizzlies	Arizona (undrafted in 2017)	
Mike James	July 3	Phoenix Suns	Panathinaikos B.C. (Greece)	
Luke Kornet	July 3	New York Knicks	Vanderbilt (undrafted in 2017)	
Johnathan Motley	July 3	Dallas Mavericks	Baylor (undrafted in 2017)	
Edmond Sumner	July 5	Indiana Pacers	Xavier	
Michael Young	July 5	Washington Wizards	Pittsburgh (undrafted in 2017)	
Bronson Koenig	July 6	Milwaukee Bucks	Wisconsin (undrafted in 2017)	
Jalen Moore	July 8	Milwaukee Bucks	Utah State (undrafted in 2017)	
Malcolm Miller	July 9	Toronto Raptors	Alba Berlin (Germany)	
Alex Caruso	July 13	Los Angeles Lakers	Oklahoma City Blue (G League)	
Antonio Blakeney	July 14	Chicago Bulls	LSU (undrafted in 2017)	
Chris Boucher	July 14	Golden State Warriors	Oregon (undrafted in 2017)	
Devin Robinson	July 14	Washington Wizards	Florida (undrafted in 2017)	
Kadeem Allen	July 19	Boston Celtics	Arizona	
Torrey Craig	July 19	Denver Nuggets	Gold Coast Rollers (Australia)	
Eric Griffin	July 20	Utah Jazz	Hapoel Gilboa Galil (Israel)	
Monté Morris	July 21	Denver Nuggets	Iowa State	
Yakuba Ouattara	July 21	Brooklyn Nets	AS Monaco Basket (France)	
Matt Costello	July 24	San Antonio Spurs	Iowa Energy (G League)	
Derrick Walton	July 24	Miami Heat	Michigan (undrafted in 2017)	
Lorenzo Brown	July 25	Toronto Raptors	Grand Rapids Drive (G League)	
Luis Montero	July 25	Detroit Pistons	Reno Bighorns (G League)	
Jack Cooley	July 29	Sacramento Kings	MHP Riesen Ludwigsburg (Germany)	
JaKarr Sampson	July 29	Sacramento Kings	Iowa Energy (G League)	
Ryan Arcidiacono	August 1	Chicago Bulls	Austin Spurs (G League)	
Anthony Brown	August 1	Minnesota Timberwolves	Erie BayHawks (G League)	
Charles Cooke	August 2	New Orleans Pelicans	Dayton (undrafted in 2017)	
Jalen Jones	August 2	New Orleans Pelicans	Maine Red Claws (G League)	
Mangok Mathiang	August 2	Charlotte Hornets	Louisville (undrafted in 2017)	
Marcus Paige	August 2	Charlotte Hornets	Salt Lake City Stars (G League)	
Daniel Hamilton	August 3	Oklahoma City Thunder	Oklahoma City Blue (G League)	
Jamil Wilson	August 3	Los Angeles Clippers	Auxilium Pallacanestro Torino (Italy)	
C. J. Wilcox	August 9	Portland Trail Blazers	Orlando Magic (waived on April 3)	
Jacob Wiley	August 14	Brooklyn Nets	Eastern Washington (undrafted in 2017)	
Demetrius Jackson	August 21	Houston Rockets	Boston Celtics (waived on July 15)	
Adreian Payne	August 21	Orlando Magic	Minnesota Timberwolves	
Alex Poythress	August 22	Indiana Pacers	Philadelphia 76ers	
James Michael McAdoo	August 30	Philadelphia 76ers	Golden State Warriors	
Jabari Bird	September 5	Boston Celtics	California	
Josh Magette	September 6	Atlanta Hawks	Los Angeles D-Fenders (G League)	
John Holland	September 8	Cleveland Cavaliers	Canton Charge (G League)	
Darrun Hilliard	September 11	San Antonio Spurs	Los Angeles Clippers (waived on June 29)	
Vince Hunter	September 11	Memphis Grizzlies	Avtodor Saratov (Russia)	
Dwight Buycks	September 12	Detroit Pistons	Fujian SBS Sturgeons (China)	
Nate Wolters	September 13	Utah Jazz	KK Crvena Zvezda (Serbia)	
Alec Peters	September 18	Phoenix Suns	Valparaiso	
Jacob Pullen°	October 14	Philadelphia 76ers	BC Khimki (Russia)	
C. J. Williams°	October 14	Los Angeles Clippers	Texas Legends (G League)	
Jamel Artis	October 15	Orlando Magic	Pittsburgh (undrafted in 2017)	
Matt Williams°	October 15	Miami Heat	UCF (undrafted in 2017)	
Gian Clavell°	October 16	Dallas Mavericks	Brujos de Guayama (Puerto Rico) (undrafted in 2017)	
Quinn Cook	October 17	Golden State Warriors	Atlanta Hawks (waived on October 13)	
PJ Dozier	October 17	Oklahoma City Thunder	South Carolina (undrafted in 2017)	
Gary Payton II°	October 17	Milwaukee Bucks (previously released on October 14)		
Vander Blue°	October 18	Los Angeles Lakers	Los Angeles D-Fenders (G League)	
London Perrantes	October 18	Cleveland Cavaliers	Virginia (undrafted in 2017)	
Wade Baldwin IV	October 19	Portland Trail Blazers	Memphis Grizzlies (waived on October 16)	
Joel Bolomboy	October 20	Milwaukee Bucks	Utah Jazz	
Isaiah Hicks	October 20	New York Knicks	North Carolina (undrafted in 2017)	
Brianté Weber	October 24	Houston Rockets	Charlotte Hornets	
Tyler Cavanaugh	November 5	Atlanta Hawks	Erie BayHawks (G League)	
Antonius Cleveland	November 17	Dallas Mavericks	Santa Cruz Warriors (G League)	
Danuel House	December 8	Phoenix Suns	Rio Grande Valley Vipers (G League)	
Milton Doyle	December 18	Brooklyn Nets	Long Island Nets (G League)	
Sean Kilpatrick	December 18	Milwaukee Bucks	Brooklyn Nets (waived on December 7)	
Kyle Collinsworth	December 19	Dallas Mavericks	Texas Legends (G League)	
Erik McCree	December 21	Utah Jazz	Sioux Falls Skyforce (G League)	
Naz Mitrou-Long	December 22	Utah Jazz	Salt Lake City Stars (G League)	
Derrick Jones Jr.	December 31	Miami Heat	Northern Arizona Suns (G League)	
Tyrone Wallace	January 5	Los Angeles Clippers	Agua Caliente Clippers (G League)	
James Young	January 5	Philadelphia 76ers	Wisconsin Herd (G League)	
Xavier Munford	January 7	Milwaukee Bucks	Wisconsin Herd (G League)	
Jalen Jones	January 11	Dallas Mavericks	New Orleans Pelicans (waived on January 8)	
Ben Moore	January 12	Indiana Pacers	Fort Wayne Mad Ants (G League)	
Myke Henry	January 13	Memphis Grizzlies	Oklahoma City Blue (G League)	
R. J. Hunter	January 14	Houston Rockets	Rio Grande Valley Vipers (G League)	
Mike James	January 14	New Orleans Pelicans	Phoenix Suns (waived on December 23)	
Georges Niang	January 14	Utah Jazz	Santa Cruz Warriors (G League)	
Markel Brown	January 15	Houston Rockets	Oklahoma City Blue (G League)	
Kay Felder	January 15	Detroit Pistons	Chicago Bulls (waived on December 19)	
Reggie Hearn	January 15	Detroit Pistons	Reno Bighorns (G League)	
Demetrius Jackson	January 15	Philadelphia 76ers	Houston Rockets (previously on 10-day contract)	
Amile Jefferson	January 15	Minnesota Timberwolves	Iowa Wolves (G League)	
Gary Payton II	January 15	Los Angeles Lakers	Milwaukee Bucks (waived on December 13)	
Marshall Plumlee	January 15	Milwaukee Bucks	Agua Caliente Clippers (G League)	
James Webb III	January 15	Brooklyn Nets	Delaware 87ers (G League)	
Andrew White	January 15	Atlanta Hawks	Maine Red Claws (G League)	

- °Training camp conversion
