= Matthew Bergeron =

Canadian gridiron football player (born 2000)

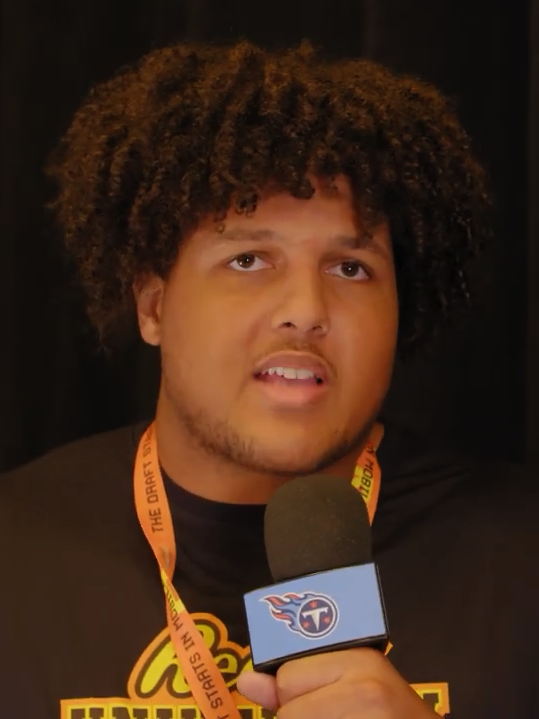
- Bergeron in 2023

No. 65 – Atlanta Falcons
- Position: Guard
- Roster status: Active

Personal information
- Born: February 26, 2000 (age 26); Victoriaville, Quebec, Canada
- Listed height: 6 ft 5 in (1.96 m)
- Listed weight: 315 lb (143 kg)

Career information
- High school: Cégep de Thetford (Quebec)
- College: Syracuse (2019–2022)
- NFL draft: 2023: 2nd round, 38th overall pick

Career history
- Atlanta Falcons (2023–present)

Awards and highlights
- Second-team All-ACC (2022)

Career NFL statistics as of Week 5, 2026
- Games started: 54
- Games played: 54
- Stats at Pro Football Reference

Matthew Kambolambi Bergeron (born February 26, 2000) is a Canadian professional football guard for the Atlanta Falcons of the National Football League (NFL). A native of Quebec, he moved to the United States to play college football at Syracuse.

== Early life ==
Bergeron was born in Victoriaville, Quebec, Canada, on February 26, 2000, to a Congolese father and Quebec-born mother. He grew up as a native speaker of French, learning English in school. Bergeron attended Cégep de Thetford and played for their gridiron football team before enrolling at Syracuse University to play college football for the Syracuse Orange. He graduated with a degree in social work from the David B. Falk College of Sport and Human Dynamics.

== College career ==
Bergeron played in 46 of Syracuse's games played through 4 seasons, with 39 starts between right tackle and left tackle. He played in all 12 games as a freshman with five starts at right tackle. He started all 11 of the Orange's games during his sophomore season, beginning the year at right tackle before moving to left tackle for the last eight games. Bergeron was named honorable mention All-Atlantic Coast Conference (ACC) in 2021. He was named a team captain entering his junior year in 2022, being voted second-team All-ACC by the end of the season. He also attended the 2023 Senior Bowl, playing as a guard.

== Professional career ==
Pre-draft measurables
Height	Weight	Arm length	Hand span	Wingspan	20-yard shuttle	Three-cone drill	Vertical jump	Broad jump
6 ft 5 1/4 in (1.96 m)	318 lb (144 kg)	33 3/4 in (0.86 m)	9 1/2 in (0.24 m)	6 ft 9 7/8 in (2.08 m)	4.66 s	7.38 s	30.5 in (0.77 m)	8 ft 7 in (2.62 m)
All values from NFL Combine/Pro Day

The Atlanta Falcons selected Bergeron with the 38th overall pick in the second round of the 2023 NFL draft. He was also ranked the #1 Canadian prospect ahead of the 2023 CFL draft, but ultimately went undrafted. He is the first NFL–draftee from his hometown of Victoriaville, Quebec. As a rookie, he started in all 17 games in the 2023 season.

On August 1, 2026, Bergeron signed a four-year, $96 million contract extension with $60 million guaranteed, keeping him under contract with the Falcons through the 2030 season.
