= GET Vosges =

- Leagues: Nationale Masculine 1
- Founded: 1978; 47 years ago
- History: AS Golbey-Épinal; 1978–2006; GET Vosges; 2006–present
- Arena: Palais des Sports
- Capacity: 2,000
- Location: Épinal, France
- President: Jérôme Valsesia
- Head coach: Laurent Mathis

Golbey Épinal Thaon Vosges, commonly known as GET Vosges, is a French basketball club based in Épinal, France. The club currently plays in the Nationale Masculine 1, the third tier of basketball in France.

== Notable players ==
Note: Flags indicate national team eligibility at FIBA-sanctioned events. Players may hold other non-FIBA nationalities not displayed.

Criteria

To appear in this section a player must have either:

- Set a club record or won an individual award while at the club
- Played at least one official international match for their national team at any time
- Played at least one official NBA match at any time.

- Tidjan Keita
- (Democratic Republic of the Congo) Eric Kibi
