= Torian Graham =

American basketball player (born 1993)

Personal information
- Born: March 26, 1993 (age 33) Durham, North Carolina
- Listed height: 6 ft 5 in (1.96 m)
- Listed weight: 205 lb (93 kg)

Career information
- High school: Christian Faith Center Academy (Creedmoor, North Carolina)
- College: Chipola College (2012–2014); Arizona State (2016–2017)
- NBA draft: 2017: undrafted
- Playing career: 2017–2020
- Position: Shooting guard

Career history
- 2017–2018: Salt Lake City Stars
- 2018: APOEL
- 2019: New Heroes Den Bosch
- 2019: Gigantes de Jalisco
- 2019: Yamagata Wyverns
- 2020: Saigon Heat
- Stats at Basketball Reference

Torian Graham (born March 26, 1993) is an American former professional basketball player who last played for New Heroes Den Bosch of the Dutch Basketball League (DBL). He played college basketball for Arizona State Sun Devils.

== College career ==
Graham played college basketball for the Arizona State Sun Devils. In his senior year, he averaged 18.6 points per game. He was the second highest scorer of the Pac-12 conference, only behind Markelle Fultz. He made 108 three-pointers on the season, shooting 38.7% from three-point range on the season. The 108 made three-pointers is 7th all-time in Pac-12 single-season history.

== Professional career ==
After going undrafted in the 2017 NBA draft, Graham played for Dallas Mavericks in the summer league of Las Vegas.

In July 2017, Spanish club Tecnyconta Zaragoza and Graham reached an agreement for the 2017–18 season. He was waived without making his debut with the team.

In October, Graham signed with the Utah Jazz of the NBA. In November 2017, the Jazz assigned him to their G League affiliate, the Salt Lake City Stars, and he averaged 8.1 points and 2.2 rebounds in 15 minutes per game. He signed with APOEL B.C. of the Cyprus Basketball Division A on August 28, 2018.

On January 19, 2019, Graham signed with New Heroes Den Bosch of the Dutch Basketball League (DBL). He signed a contract for the remainder of the 2018–19 season. On February 8, 2018, he scored 28 points on 11–14 shooting, in a 55–88 win over Den Helder. On February 27, 2019, New Heroes released Graham by mutual consent. In four DBL games with Den Bosch, he averaged 15 points per game.
