= Cégep de Thetford =

Public college in Thetford Mines, Quebec

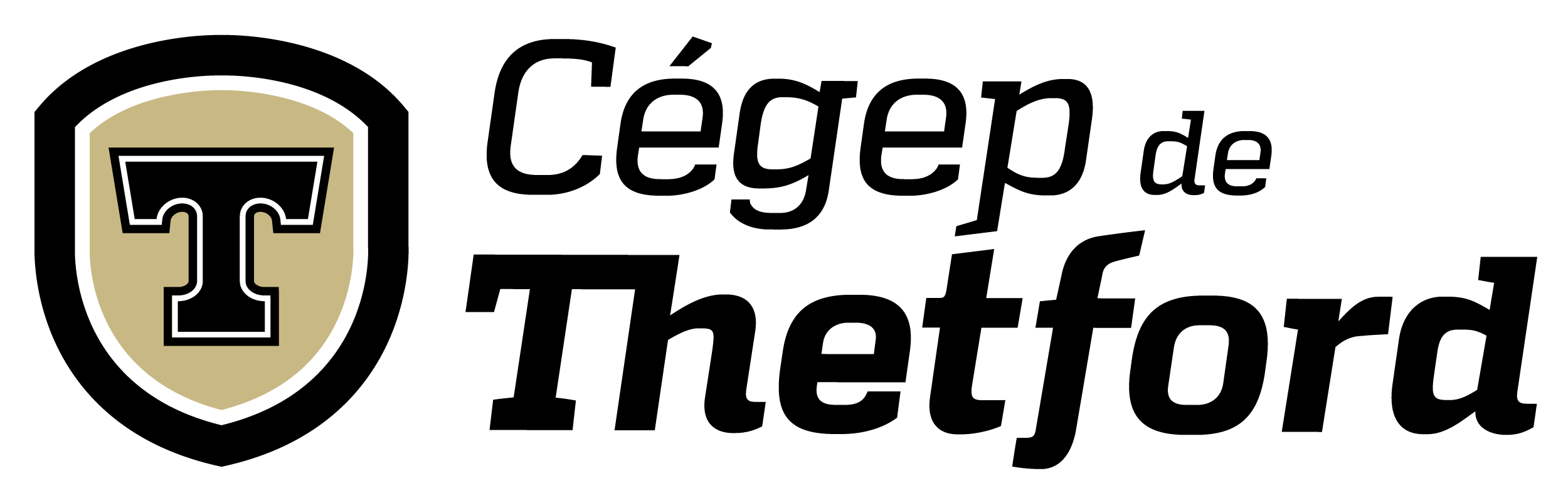
- Established: 1969
- Location: Thetford Mines, Quebec, Canada; 46.097549°N 71.322749°W
- Website: www.cegepthetford.ca

Cégep de Thetford is a College of general and vocational education (CEGEP) in Thetford Mines, Quebec, Canada. It is located at 671 boulevard Frontenac Ouest. It was established in 1969.

The Cégep de Thetford welcomes international students through various programs. These students come from a dozen countries, including France.

Five residences are located in the vicinity of the Cégep de Thetford, offering more than 130 students the opportunity to live there.

The Cégep also offers six programs of study in the Lotbinière region, thanks to its Centre d'études collégiales located in Saint-Agapit.

== Notable alumni ==
- Tidjan Keita (born 1996), French-Guinean basketball player in the Israeli Basketball Premier League
- Matthew Bergeron (born 2000), Canadian gridiron football player for Syracuse University, selected by the Atlanta Falcons with the 38th overall pick in the 2023 NFL draft.

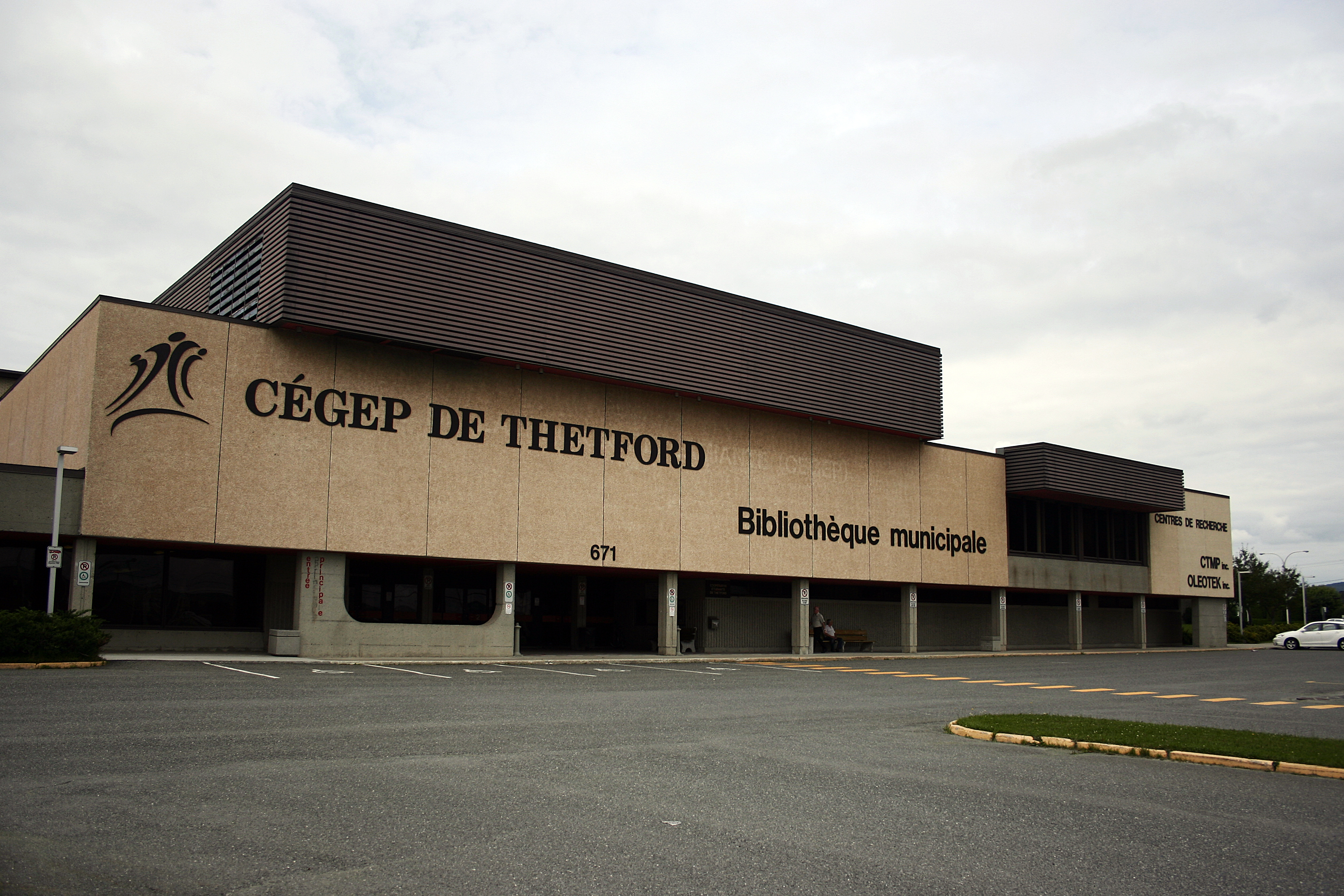
Front of Cegep de Thetford
