= Tidjan Keita =

French-Guinean basketball player

Free agent
- Position: Forward

Personal information
- Born: November 30, 1996 (age 29) Paris, France
- Listed height: 6 ft 10 in (2.08 m)
- Listed weight: 205 lb (93 kg)

Career information
- High school: Cégep de Thetford (Thetford Mines, Quebec, Canada)

Career history
- 2018–2019: GET Vosges
- 2019–2020: Coburg
- 2020–2021: Kirchheim Knights
- 2021–2022: Noma Iserlohn Kangaroos
- 2022: Niagara River Lions
- 2022–2023: Hapoel Be'er Sheva
- 2023–2024: ADA Blois
- 2024: Hermine Nantes
- 2024–2025: Tizona
- Stats at Basketball Reference

Tidjan Keita (born November 30, 1996) is a French-Guinean basketball player who plays forward. He plays for the Guinea national team.

== Early life ==
Keita was born in Paris, France. He started playing basketball in Paris when he was 17 years old. He is 6 ft 10 in (208 cm) tall, and weighs 205 pounds (93 kg). He has a 7' 3" wingspan.

He attended college and played basketball at Cégep de Thetford in Thetford Mines, Quebec, Canada.

== Professional career ==
=== 2017-19 ===
Keita played two games for the Toronto Raptors at 2017 NBA Summer League in Las Vegas, Nevada.

In October 2017, the NBA's Phoenix Suns signed Keita; later the same month they waived him.

In 2018-19 Keita played for GET Vosges in the NM1 in France. He averaged 2.6 points per game.

In 2019-20 he played for BBC Coburg in Coburg, Germany, in the German ProB. Keita averaged 15.1 points and 7.6 rebounds per game.

=== 2020-present ===
In 2020-21 Keita played for VfL Kirchheim Knights in Kirchheim unter Teck, Germany, in the German ProA. He averaged 3.5 points per game.

In 2021-22 he played for the Noma Iserlohn Kangaroos in Iserlohn, Germany, in the German Pro B. Keita averaged 14.3 points, 8.7 rebounds (5th in the league), and 1.6 blocks (5th) per game.

The same season Keita then played for the Niagara River Lions in the CEBL in Canada. He averaged 5.7 points per game.

On August 15, 2022, Keita signed a two-year contract with Hapoel Be'er Sheva of the Israeli Basketball Premier League, and he has played forward with the team since then.

== International play ==
He played for the Guinea men's national basketball team in 2021 in the African FIBA World Cup Qualifier and the FIBA AfroBasket.
