= Antone Warren =

American basketball player (born 1993)

Personal information
- Born: February 26, 1993 (age 33)
- Listed height: 6 ft 10 in (2.08 m)
- Listed weight: 265 lb (120 kg)

Career information
- High school: Fern Creek (Louisville, Kentucky)
- College: Volunteer State CC (2015–2016); Antelope Valley College (2016–2017)
- NBA draft: 2017: undrafted
- Position: Center
- Number: 44

Antone Warren is a center, who played at the Antelope Valley College men's basketball team and who participated in the 2017 NBA draft.

== Career ==
=== College ===
A graduate of Fern Creek High School in Louisville, Kentucky, Warren spent his freshman year at Kankakee Community College in Kankakee, Illinois. After a year at Volunteer State Community College in Gallatin, Tennessee, where he did not play varsity basketball due to suspension, Warren moved on to Antelope Valley College in Lancaster, California. As a sophomore in 2016–17, he saw action in 33 games with 28 starts, averaging 11.4 points, 7.4 rebounds in 17.2 minutes per contest. He was the number 1 ranked center in the 2017 junior college class and in March 2017 opted to forgo his remaining college eligibility to start his professional career and to submit his name to the 2017 NBA draft. He was not picked by any team though.
