= 2017 NBA draft =

Basketball player selection

General information
- Sport: Basketball
- Date: June 22, 2017
- Location: Barclays Center (Brooklyn, New York)
- Networks: ESPN; The Vertical

Overview
- 60 total selections in 2 rounds
- League: NBA
- First selection: Markelle Fultz (Philadelphia 76ers)

The 2017 NBA draft was held on June 22, 2017, at Barclays Center in Brooklyn, New York. National Basketball Association (NBA) teams took turns selecting U.S. college basketball players and other eligible players, including international players.

The draft lottery took place during the playoffs on May 16, 2017. The 53–29 Boston Celtics, who were also the #1 seed in the Eastern Conference and reached the Eastern Conference Finals at the time of the NBA draft lottery, won the #1 pick with pick swapping rights thanks to a previous trade with the Brooklyn Nets, who had the worst record the previous season. The Los Angeles Lakers, who had risked losing their 2017 first round pick to the Philadelphia 76ers, moved up two spots to get the second overall pick, while Philadelphia moved up to receive the No. 3 pick due to the Sacramento Kings moving up in the draft, which activated pick swapping rights the 76ers had from an earlier trade. On June 19, four days before the NBA draft began, the Celtics and 76ers traded their top first round picks to each other, meaning the holders of the top four picks of this year's draft would be exactly the same as the previous year's draft. The Celtics intended to draft Duke forward Jayson Tatum with their pick regardless of its position, who ultimately developed into an MVP candidate and led the team to their 18th championship in 2024.

The draft class was the youngest draft class to date, with the most freshmen and fewest seniors selected in the first round; the top seven picks in the draft were college freshmen. It was the third time, and the second in a row, that three players were selected from Serbian team KK Mega Basket in the same draft (Vlatko Čančar, Ognjen Jaramaz, Alpha Kaba), with it previously occurring during the 2014 and 2016 NBA draft. It also included the second Finn selected in the first round, and the first Bulgarian player selected since 1985. The draft also received much media coverage from ESPN pertaining to eventual second overall pick Lonzo Ball and his outspoken father, LaVar Ball, much to the chagrin of many sports fans and even some ESPN employees. This was one of the rare occasions where a player drafted from their year did not win Rookie of the Year; the award went to 2016 first overall pick Ben Simmons, the first player since Blake Griffin in 2011 to win the award in a year he was not drafted.

== Draft selections ==
PG	Point guard	SG	Shooting guard	SF	Small forward	PF	Power forward	C	Center

*	Denotes player who has been selected for at least one All-Star Game and All-NBA Team
^{+}	Denotes player who has been selected for at least one All-Star Game
^{#}	Denotes player who has never appeared in an NBA regular-season or playoff game
^{~}	Denotes player who has been selected as Rookie of the Year

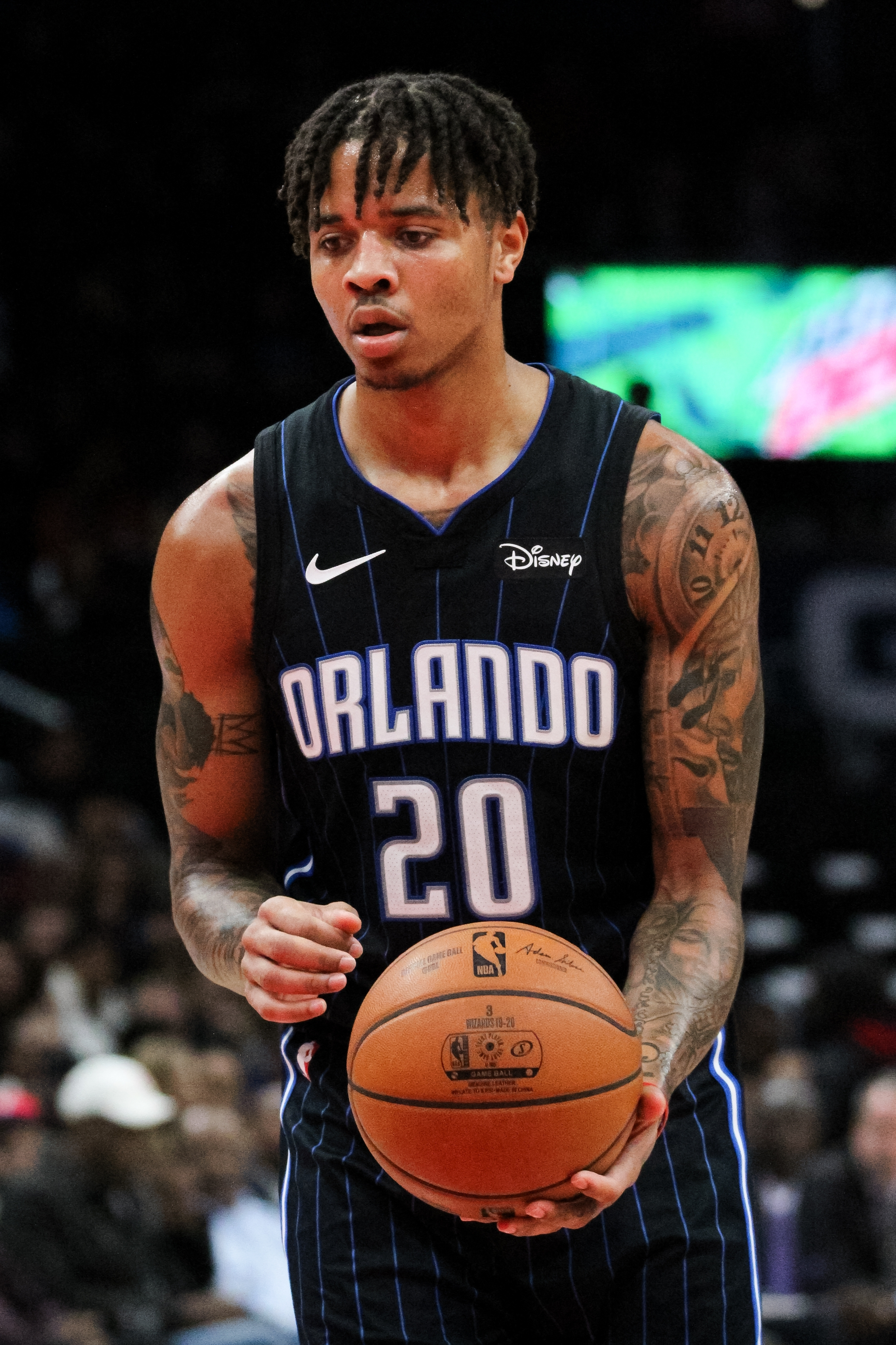
Markelle Fultz was selected first overall by the Philadelphia 76ers.

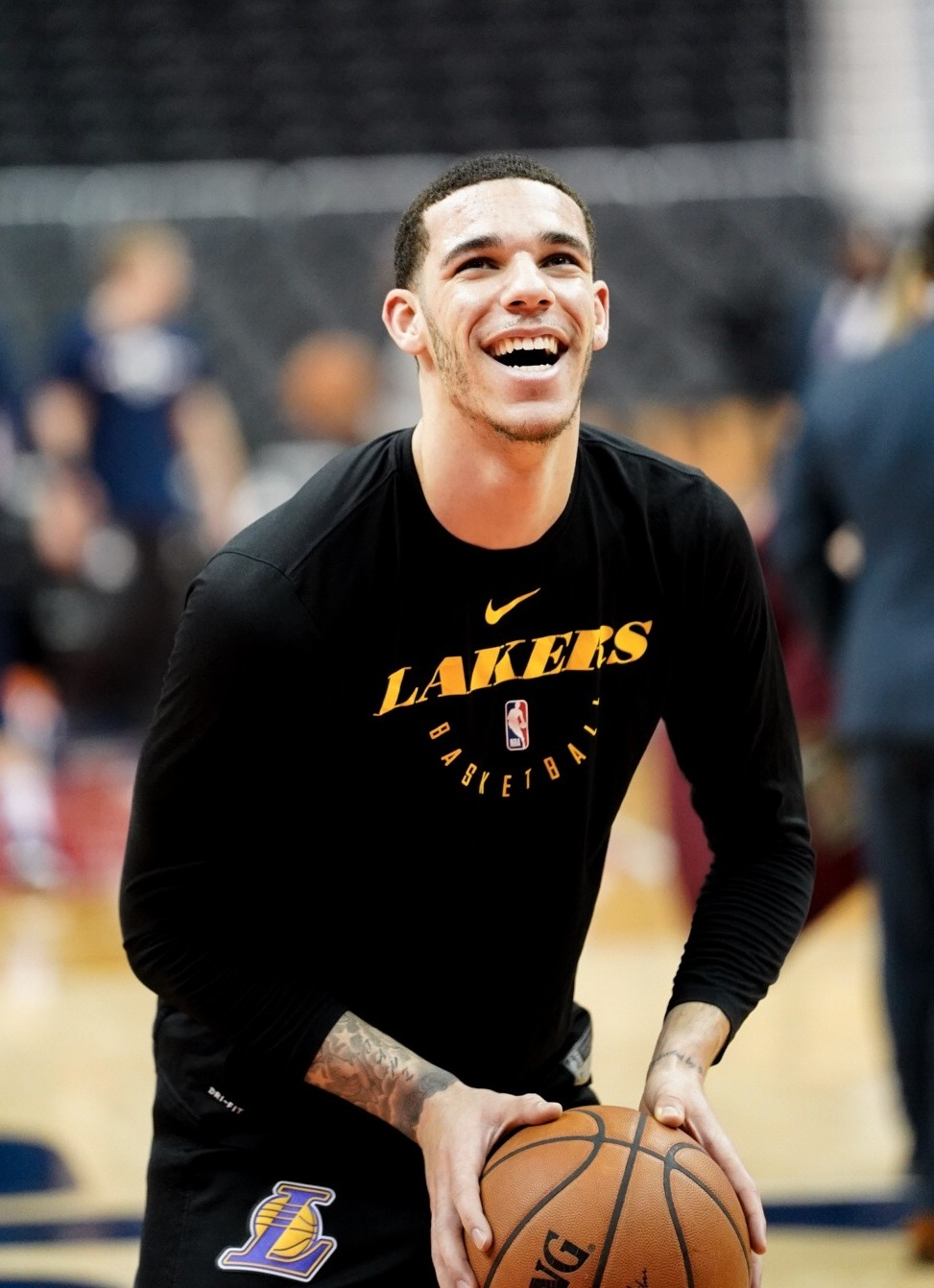
Lonzo Ball was selected 2nd overall by the Los Angeles Lakers.

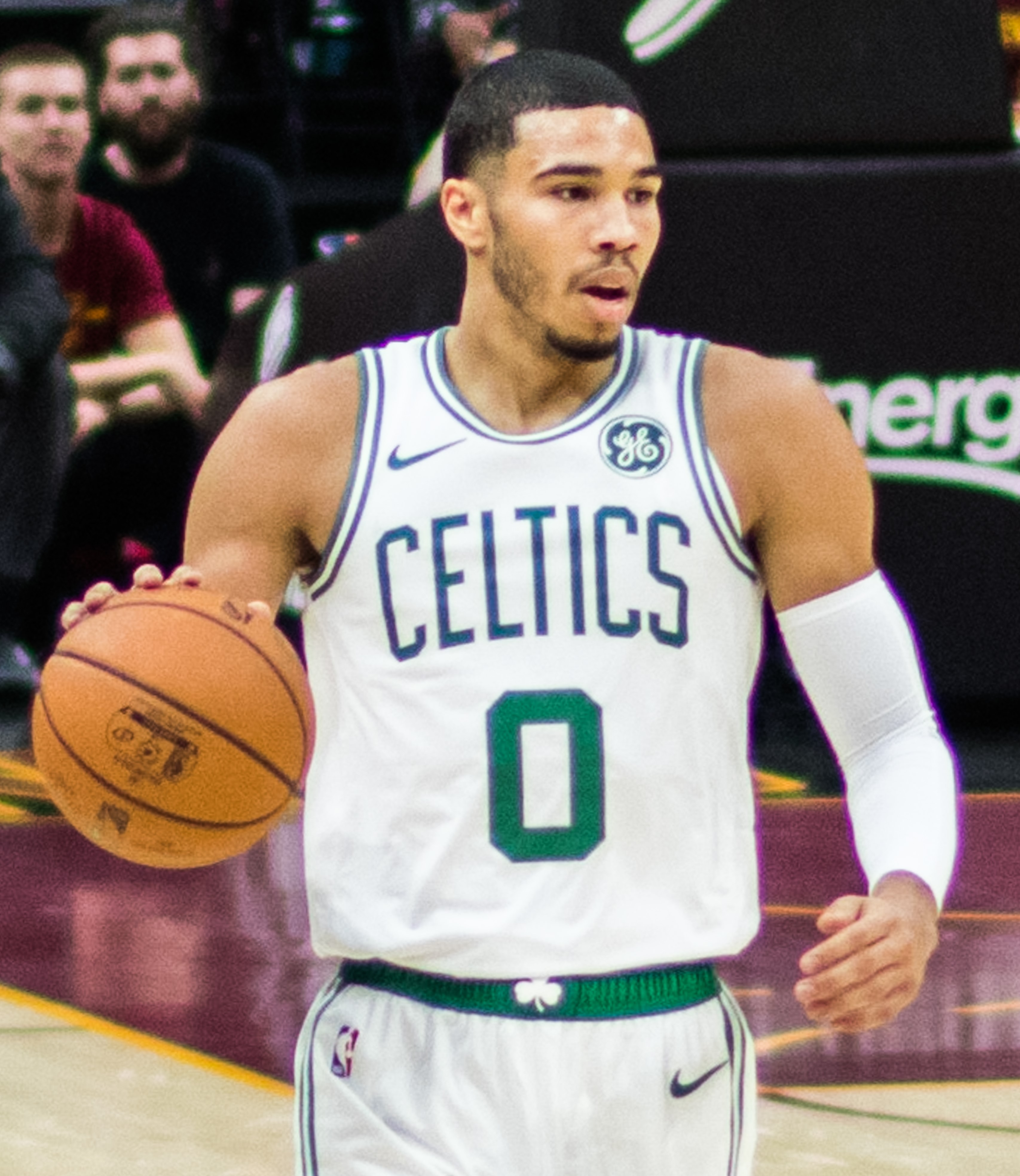
Jayson Tatum was selected 3rd overall by the Boston Celtics.

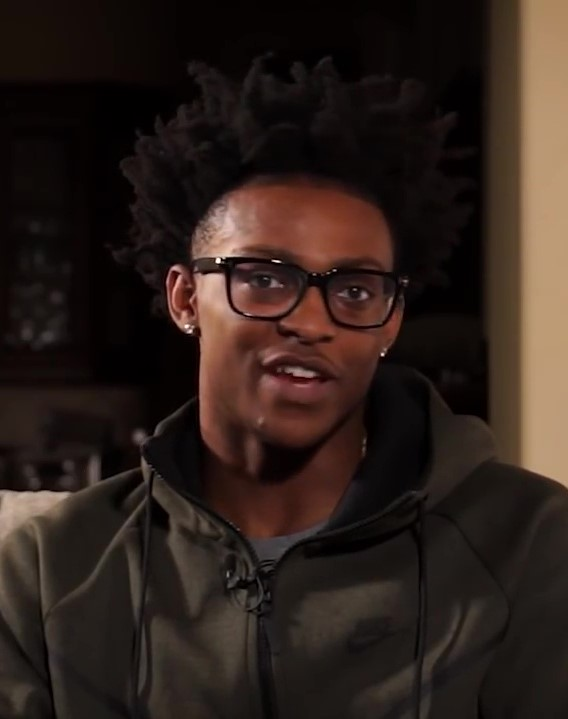
De'Aaron Fox was selected 5th overall by the Sacramento Kings.

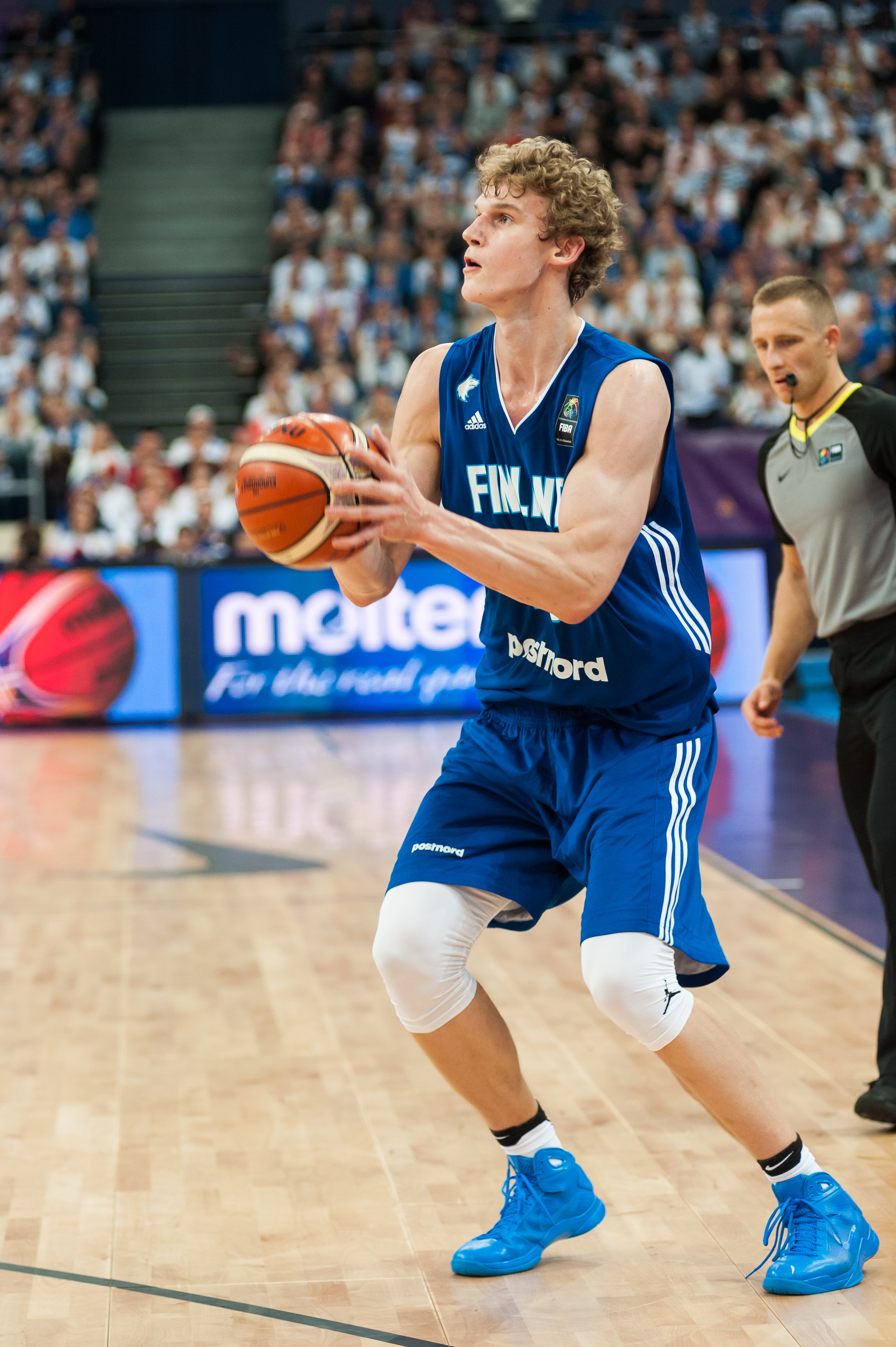
Lauri Markkanen was selected 7th overall by the Minnesota Timberwolves (traded to the Chicago Bulls).

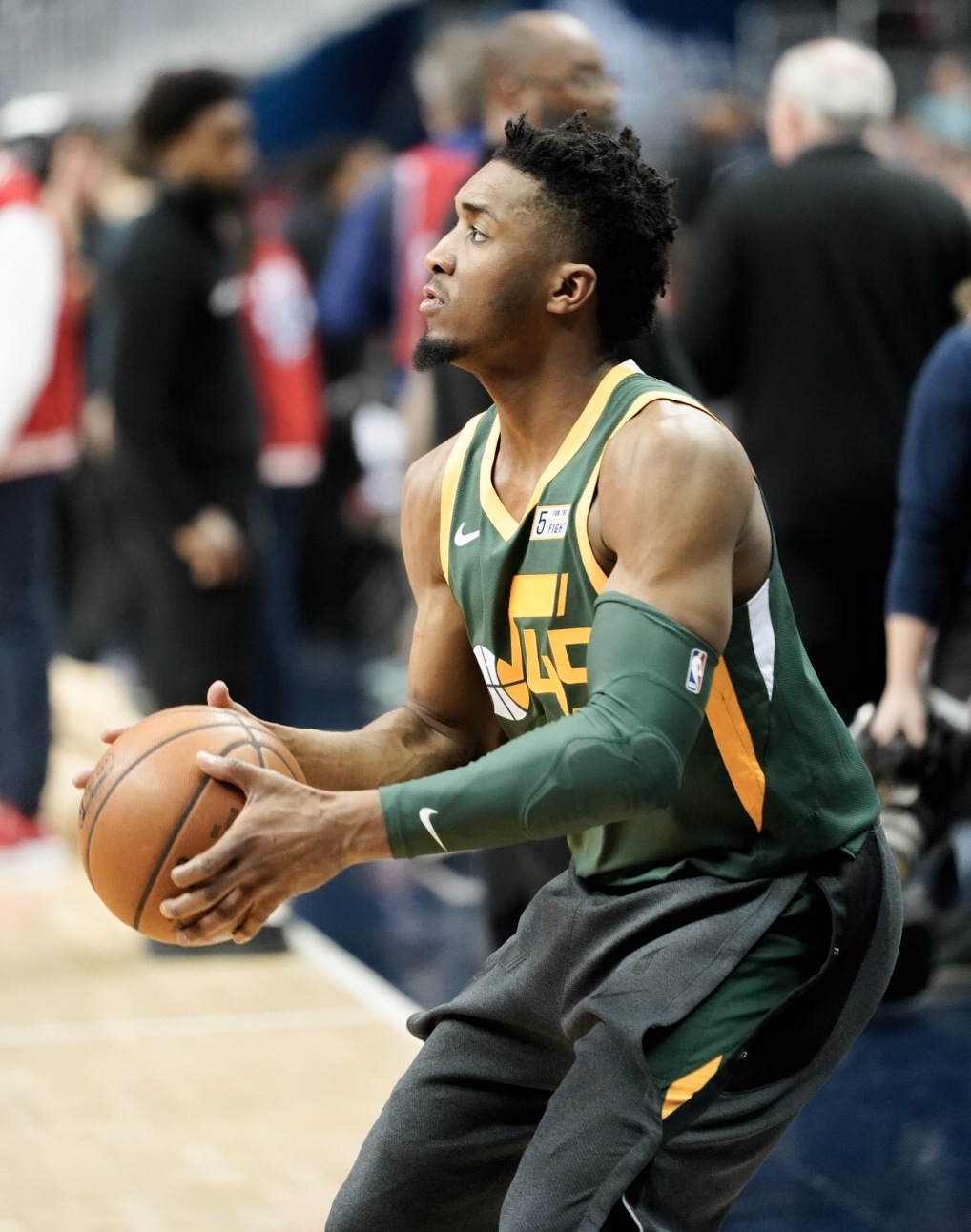
Donovan Mitchell was selected 13th overall by the Denver Nuggets (traded to the Utah Jazz).

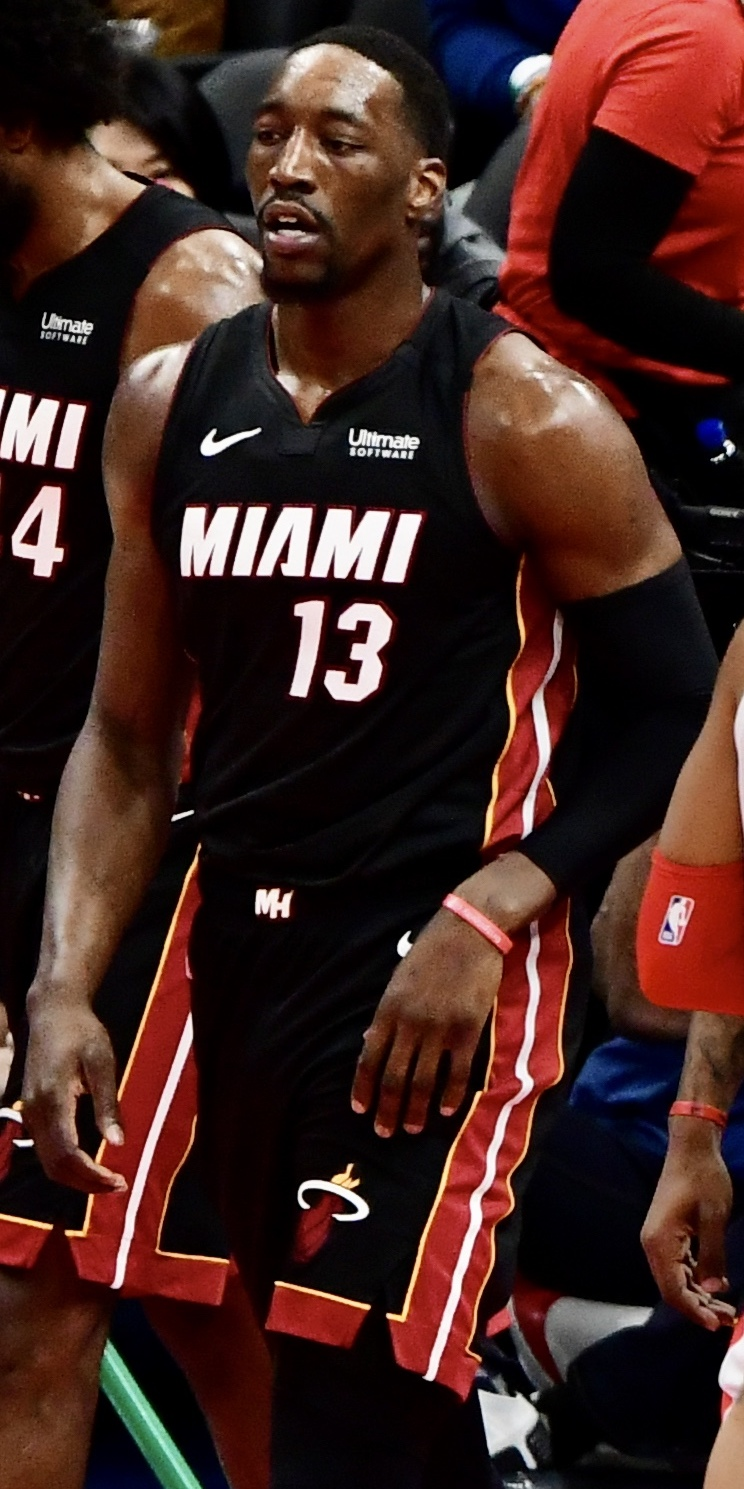
Bam Adebayo was selected 14th overall by the Miami Heat.

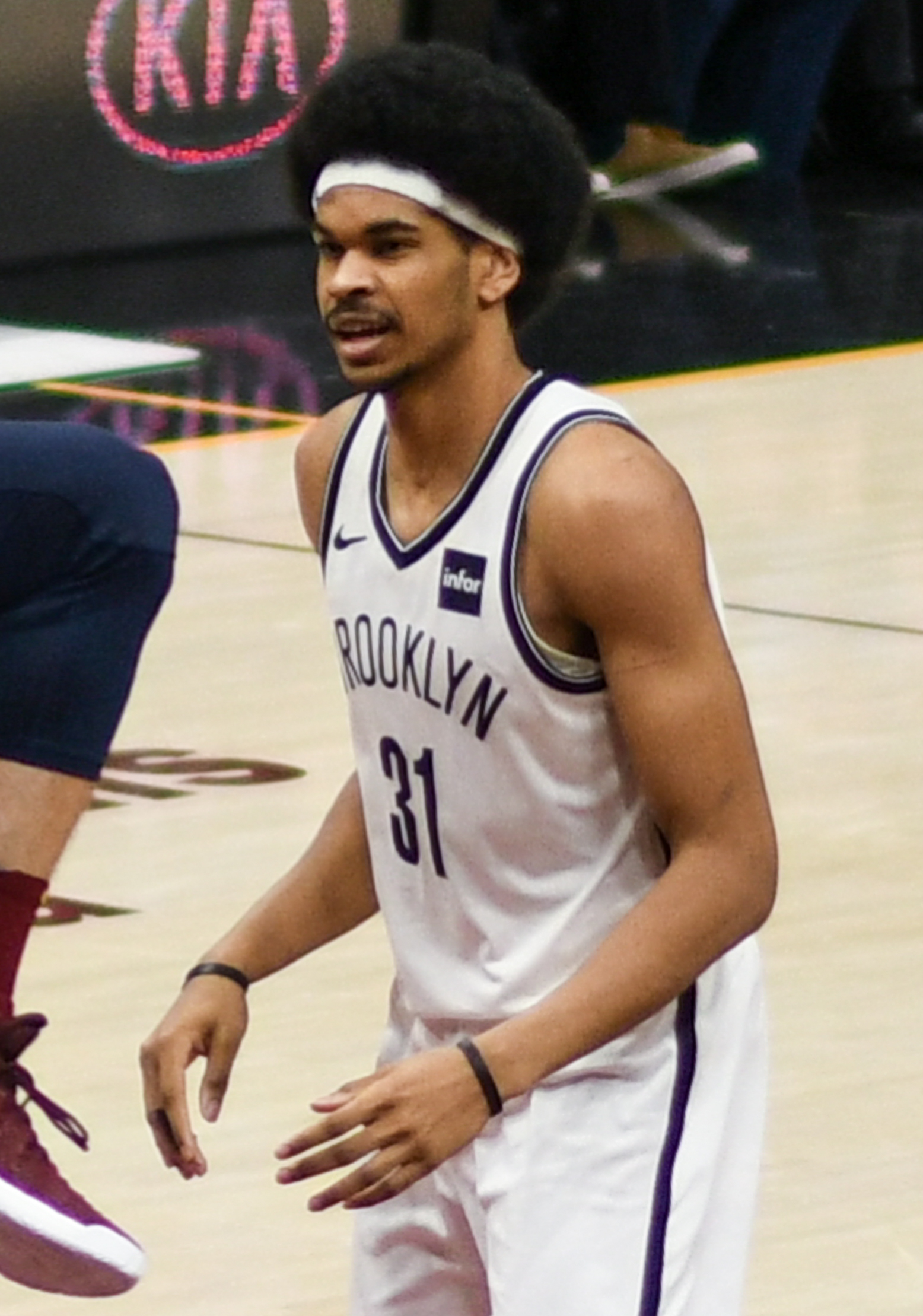
Jarrett Allen was selected 22nd overall by the Brooklyn Nets.

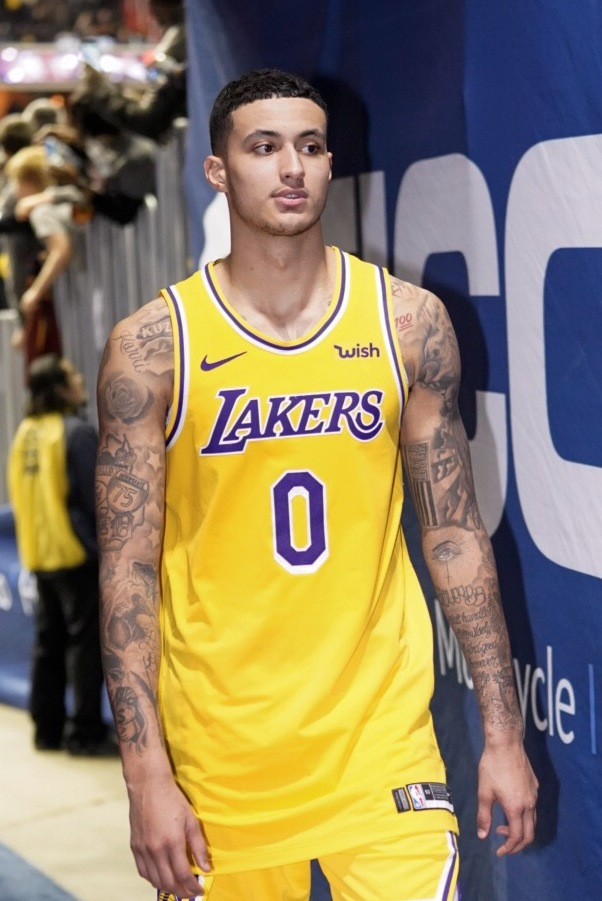
Kyle Kuzma was selected 27th overall by the Brooklyn Nets (traded to the Los Angeles Lakers).

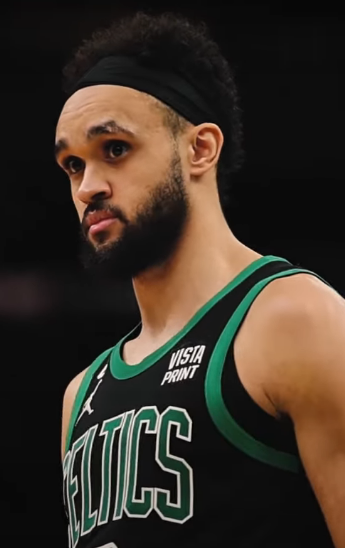
Derrick White was selected 29th overall by the San Antonio Spurs.

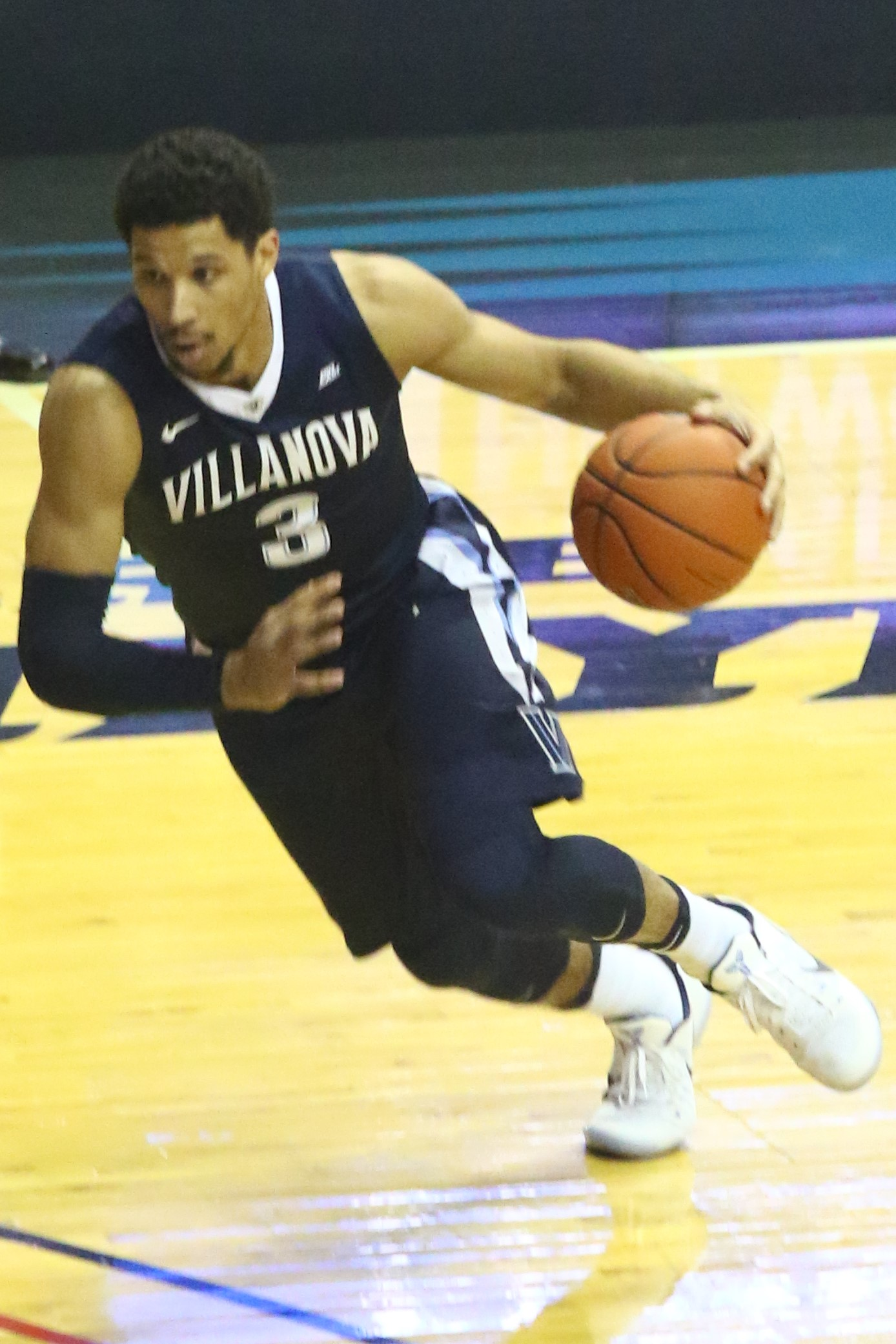
Josh Hart was selected 30th overall by the Utah Jazz (traded to the Los Angeles Lakers).

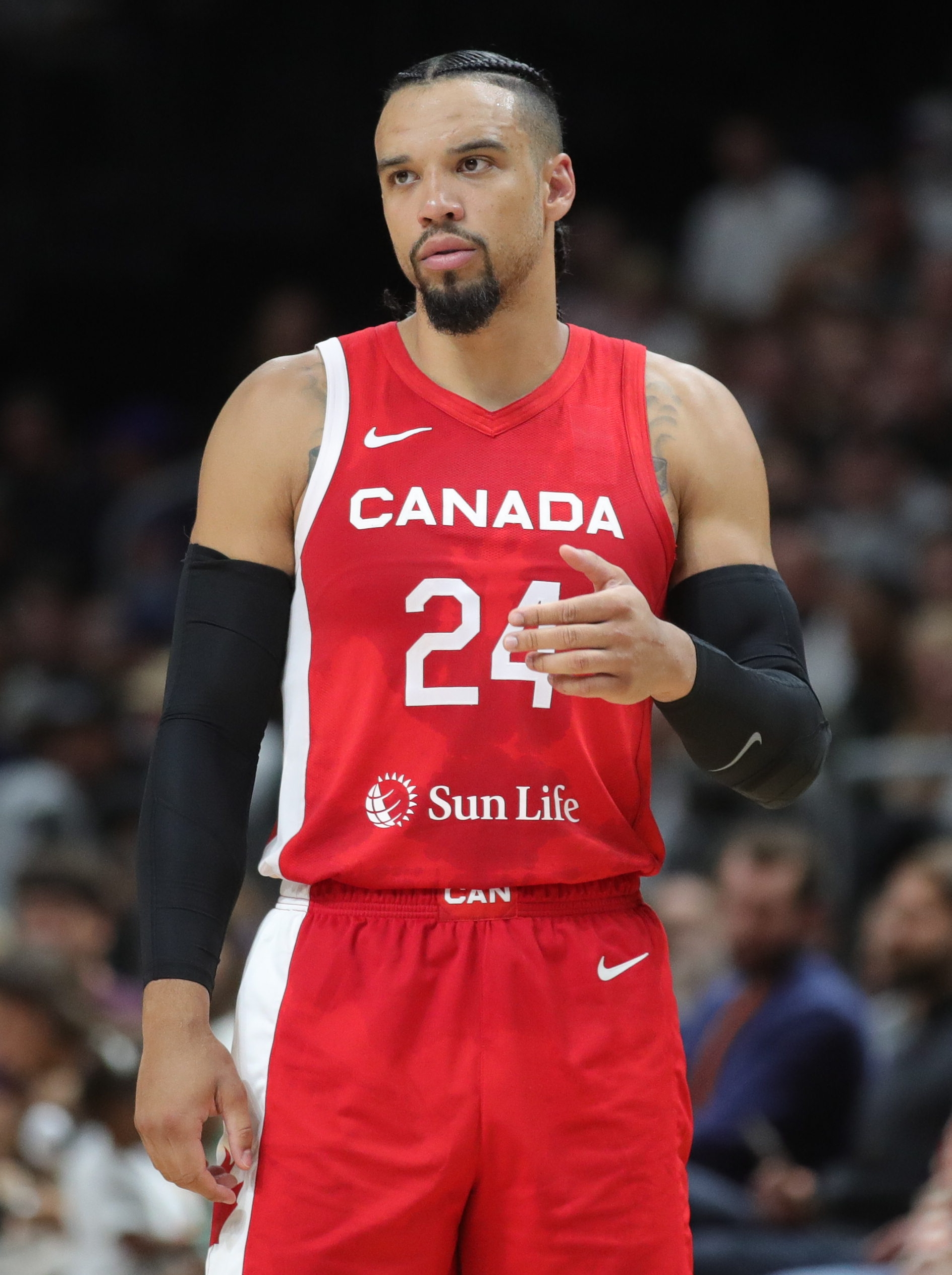
Dillon Brooks was selected 45th overall by the Houston Rockets (traded to the Memphis Grizzlies).

Rnd.	Pick	Player	Pos.	Nationality (Note: Nationality indicates the player's national team or representative nationality. If a player had not competed at the international level, then the nationality indicates the national team which the player was eligible to represent according to FIBA rules.)	Team	School / club team
1	1	Markelle Fultz	PG	United States	Philadelphia 76ers (from Brooklyn via Boston) (Note: July 12, 2013: Brooklyn Nets to Boston Celtics: Boston acquired Gerald Wallace, Kris Humphries, Keith Bogans, MarShon Brooks, Kris Joseph, a 2014 first-round pick, a 2016 first-round pick, a 2018 first-round pick and the option to swap 2017 first-round picks; Boston exercised this option on April 3, 2017.; Brooklyn acquired Paul Pierce, Kevin Garnett, Jason Terry and D. J. White; Brooklyn also acquired Boston's second-round pick for compensation after the previous season ended.) (Note: June 19, 2017: Boston Celtics to Philadelphia 76ers: Philadelphia acquired the #1 pick in the 2017 NBA draft; Boston acquired the #3 pick in the 2017 NBA draft and a 2018 Los Angeles Lakers first-round pick (#2-5) or 2019 first-round pick)	Washington (Fr.)
1	2	Lonzo Ball	PG	United States	Los Angeles Lakers	UCLA (Fr.)
1	3	Jayson Tatum^{*}	SF	United States	Boston Celtics (from Sacramento via Philadelphia) (Note: July 10, 2015: Sacramento Kings to Philadelphia 76ers: Philadelphia acquired Nik Stauskas, Carl Landry, Jason Thompson, a 2019 first-round pick, and the right to swap 2016 & 2017 first-round picks; Sacramento acquired the draft rights to Artūras Gudaitis and Luka Mitrović)	Duke (Fr.)
1	4	Josh Jackson	SF	United States	Phoenix Suns	Kansas (Fr.)
1	5	De'Aaron Fox^{*}	PG	United States	Sacramento Kings (from Philadelphia)	Kentucky (Fr.)
1	6	Jonathan Isaac	PF/SF	United States	Orlando Magic	Florida State (Fr.)
1	7	Lauri Markkanen^{+}	PF	Finland	Minnesota Timberwolves (traded to Chicago Bulls) (Note: June 22, 2017: Minnesota Timberwolves to Chicago Bulls: Chicago acquired Minnesota's first round pick (No. 7), Kris Dunn, and Zach LaVine; Minnesota acquired Jimmy Butler and Chicago's first round pick (No. 16))	Arizona (Fr.)
1	8	Frank Ntilikina	PG	France (Note: Frank Ntilikina was born in Belgium to Rwandan parents, but represents France in international competitions.)	New York Knicks	SIG Strasbourg (France)
1	9	Dennis Smith Jr.	PG	United States	Dallas Mavericks	NC State (Fr.)
1	10	Zach Collins	C/PF	United States	Sacramento Kings (from New Orleans, (Note: February 20, 2017: New Orleans Pelicans to Sacramento Kings: New Orleans acquired DeMarcus Cousins and Omri Casspi; Sacramento acquired Buddy Hield, Tyreke Evans, Langston Galloway, New Orleans' 2017 first-round pick (top 3 protected), and a second-round pick (originally belonged to Philadelphia)) traded to Portland Trail Blazers (Note: June 22, 2017: Sacramento Kings to Portland Trail Blazers: Portland acquired Sacramento's first round pick (No. 10); Sacramento acquired Portland's first round picks (No. 15 and No. 20)))	Gonzaga (Fr.)
1	11	Malik Monk	SG	United States	Charlotte Hornets	Kentucky (Fr.)
1	12	Luke Kennard	SG	United States	Detroit Pistons	Duke (So.)
1	13	Donovan Mitchell^{*}	SG	United States	Denver Nuggets (traded to Utah Jazz) (Note: June 22, 2017: Denver Nuggets to Utah Jazz: Utah acquired Denver's first round pick (No. 13); Denver acquired Utah's first round pick (No. 24) and Trey Lyles)	Louisville (So.)
1	14	Bam Adebayo^{+}	PF/C	United States	Miami Heat	Kentucky (Fr.)
1	15	Justin Jackson	SF	United States	Portland Trail Blazers (traded to Sacramento Kings)	North Carolina (Jr.)
1	16	Justin Patton	C	United States	Chicago Bulls (traded to Minnesota)	Creighton (Fr.)
1	17	D. J. Wilson	PF/SF	United States	Milwaukee Bucks	Michigan (Jr.)
1	18	T. J. Leaf	PF	Israel (Note: T. J. Leaf was born in Israel, but was raised in the United States. He holds dual citizenship, but has represented Israel during international competitions.)	Indiana Pacers	UCLA (Fr.)
1	19	John Collins	PF	United States	Atlanta Hawks	Wake Forest (So.)
1	20	Harry Giles III	PF/C	United States	Portland Trail Blazers (from Memphis via Denver and Cleveland, (Note: January 22, 2013: Memphis Grizzlies to Cleveland Cavaliers: Memphis acquired Jon Leuer; Cleveland acquired Marreese Speights, Josh Selby, Wayne Ellington, and Memphis' protected future first-round pick; the pick could not be conveyed until two years after Memphis sent its first-round pick to Minnesota (which happened in 2013) and was protected #1-5 and #15-30 in 2015, then #1-5 in 2017 and 2018; January 7, 2015: Cleveland Cavaliers to Denver Nuggets: Cleveland acquired Timofey Mozgov and the worse of Chicago's and Portland's 2015 second-round picks; Denver acquired Oklahoma City's 2015 protected first-round pick and Memphis's first-round pick (protected through 2018); February 13, 2017: Denver Nuggets to Portland Trail Blazers: Denver acquired Mason Plumlee and a 2018 second-round pick; Portland acquired Jusuf Nurkić and Memphis's protected first-round pick (protected #1-5 through 2018)) traded to Sacramento Kings)	Duke (Fr.)
1	21	Terrance Ferguson	SG	United States	Oklahoma City Thunder	Adelaide 36ers (Australia)
1	22	Jarrett Allen^{+}	C	United States	Brooklyn Nets (from Washington) (Note: February 22, 2017: Washington Wizards to Brooklyn Nets: Washington acquired Bojan Bogdanović and Chris McCullough; Brooklyn acquired Andrew Nicholson, Marcus Thornton, and Washington's 2017 first-round pick (protected #1-14))	Texas (Fr.)
1	23	OG Anunoby	SF	United Kingdom (Note: Anunoby was born in the United Kingdom to Nigerian parents. He holds dual citizenship but is yet to debut for either country in international competition.)	Toronto Raptors (from L.A. Clippers via Milwaukee) (Note: August 26, 2014:Los Angeles Clippers to Milwaukee Bucks: Los Angeles Clippers acquired Carlos Delfino, Miroslav Raduljica, and a 2015 second-round pick; Milwaukee acquired Jared Dudley and the Clippers' protected 2017 first-round pick; June 25, 2015: Milwaukee Bucks to Toronto Raptors: Milwaukee acquired Greivis Vásquez; Toronto acquired rights to Norman Powell and the Los Angeles Clippers' 2017 first-round pick)	Indiana (So.)
1	24	Tyler Lydon	PF	United States	Utah Jazz (traded to Denver Nuggets)	Syracuse (So.)
1	25	Anžejs Pasečņiks	C	Latvia	Orlando Magic (from Toronto, (Note: February 14, 2017: Toronto Raptors to Orlando Magic: Toronto acquired Serge Ibaka; Orlando acquired Terrence Ross and worse of Los Angeles Clippers' 2017 first-round pick and Toronto's 2017 first-round pick) traded to Philadelphia 76ers) (Note: June 22, 2017: Orlando Magic to Philadelphia 76ers: Philadelphia acquired Orlando's first-round pick (No. 25); Orlando acquired a protected first-round selection and a second-round selection in 2020)	Herbalife Gran Canaria (Spain)
1	26	Caleb Swanigan	PF	United States	Portland Trail Blazers (from Cleveland) (Note: February 18, 2016: Cleveland Cavaliers to Portland Trail Blazers: Cleveland acquired a future second-round pick (2018); Portland acquired Anderson Varejão and a future first-round pick; January 6, 2017: Cleveland Cavaliers to Portland Trail Blazers: Cleveland reacquired its own 2018 first-round pick; Portland acquired a first-round pick)	Purdue (So.)
1	27	Kyle Kuzma	PF	United States	Brooklyn Nets (from Boston, traded to Los Angeles Lakers) (Note: June 22, 2017: Los Angeles Lakers to Brooklyn Nets: Brooklyn acquired D'Angelo Russell and Timofey Mozgov; Los Angeles Lakers acquired Brook Lopez and Brooklyn's first-round pick (No. 27))	Utah (Jr.)
1	28	Tony Bradley	PF/C	United States	Los Angeles Lakers (from Houston, (Note: February 23, 2017: Houston Rockets to Los Angeles Lakers: Houston acquired Lou Williams; Los Angeles Lakers acquired Corey Brewer and Houston's 2017 first-round round pick.) traded to Utah Jazz) (Note: June 22, 2017: Los Angeles Lakers to Utah Jazz: Utah acquired Los Angeles' first-round pick (No. 28); Los Angeles Lakers acquired Utah's first-round pick (No. 30) and second-round pick (No. 42))	North Carolina (Fr.)
1	29	Derrick White	PG/SG	United States	San Antonio Spurs	Colorado (Sr.)
1	30	Josh Hart	SG	United States	Utah Jazz (from Golden State, (Note: July 10, 2013: Golden State Warriors to Utah Jazz (three-team trade with Denver Nuggets): Golden State acquired Andre Iguodala and Kevin Murphy; Denver acquired Randy Foye and Golden State's 2018 second-round pick; Utah acquired Andris Biedriņš, Richard Jefferson, Brandon Rush, cash considerations, Denver's 2018 second-round pick, and Golden State's 2014 first-round pick, 2016 second-round pick, 2017 first-round pick, and 2017 second-round pick) traded to Los Angeles Lakers)	Villanova (Sr.)
2	31	Frank Jackson	PG	United States	Charlotte Hornets (from Brooklyn via Atlanta Hawks, (Note: July 11, 2012: Brooklyn Nets to Atlanta Hawks: Brooklyn acquired Joe Johnson; Atlanta acquired DeShawn Stevenson, Johan Petro, Jordan Farmar, Anthony Morrow, Jordan Williams, Houston's 2013 first-round pick, and Brooklyn's 2017 second-round pick; June 20, 2017: Atlanta Hawks to Charlotte Hornets: Atlanta acquired Marco Belinelli, Miles Plumlee, and the 41st pick of the draft; Charlotte acquired Dwight Howard and the 31st pick of the draft) traded to New Orleans Pelicans) (Note: June 22, 2017: Charlotte Hornets to New Orleans Pelicans: New Orleans acquired Charlotte's second-round pick (No. 31); Charlotte acquired New Orleans' second-round pick (No. 40) and cash considerations)	Duke (Fr.)
2	32	Davon Reed	SG	United States	Phoenix Suns	Miami (Sr.)
2	33	Wes Iwundu	SF	United States	Orlando Magic (from L.A. Lakers) (Note: August 10, 2012: Los Angeles Lakers to Orlando Magic (four-team trade with Denver Nuggets and Philadelphia 76ers): Denver acquired Andre Iguodala from Philadelphia; Los Angeles acquired Dwight Howard, Earl Clark, and Chris Duhon, all from Orlando; Philadelphia acquired Andrew Bynum from Los Angeles and Jason Richardson from Orlando; Orlando acquired Arron Afflalo, Al Harrington, Denver's 2013 second-round pick, and the worse of Denver's and New York's 2014 first-round pick from Denver; Nikola Vučević, Maurice Harkless, and Philadelphia's 2015 conditional first-round pick (not conveyed as of 2017) from Philadelphia; Josh McRoberts, Christian Eyenga, a 2015 protected second-round pick, and the Lakers' protected 2017 protected first-round pick (converted to the Lakers' 2017 second-round pick and 2018 second-round pick, which may be conveyed to Toronto))	Kansas State (Sr.)
2	34	Frank Mason III	PG	United States	Sacramento Kings (from Philadelphia via New Orleans)	Kansas (Sr.)
2	35	Ivan Rabb	PF	United States	Orlando Magic (traded to Memphis Grizzlies) (Note: June 22, 2017: Orlando Magic to Memphis Grizzlies: Memphis acquired Orlando's second-round pick (No. 35); Orlando acquired a future second-round selection from Memphis)	California (So.)
2	36	Jonah Bolden	PF	Australia (Note: Bolden was born in Australia to an American father. He holds dual citizenship and played for Australia in junior competition.)	Philadelphia 76ers (from New York via Utah and Toronto) (Note: July 10, 2013: New York Knicks to Toronto Raptors: New York acquired Andrea Bargnani; Toronto acquired Marcus Camby, Steve Novak, Quentin Richardson, New York's 2014 second-round pick, New York's 2016 first-round pick, and New York's 2017 second-round pick; July 10, 2014: Toronto Raptors to Utah Jazz: Toronto acquired Diante Garrett; Utah acquired Steve Novak and New York's 2017 second-round pick) (Note: August 26, 2016: Utah Jazz to Philadelphia 76ers: Utah Jazz acquired Kendall Marshall; Philadelphia acquired Tibor Pleiß and best and worst of four 2017 second-round picks: Golden State's second round pick and New York's second-round pick)	Crvena zvezda (Serbia)
2	37	Semi Ojeleye	SF/PF	United States (Note: Both Semi Ojeleye and Ike Anigbogu were born in the United States to Nigerian parents.)	Boston Celtics (from Minnesota via Phoenix) (Note: July 27, 2012: Minnesota Timberwolves to Phoenix Suns (three-team trade with New Orleans Hornets (now Pelicans)): Phoenix acquired the rights to Brad Miller and Jerome Dyson from New Orleans; Wesley Johnson and a protected first-round pick from Minnesota; New Orleans acquired Robin Lopez, Hakim Warrick, and cash considerations from Phoenix; Minnesota acquired the Los Angeles Lakers' 2014 second-round pick from Phoenix; Brooklyn's 2013 second-round pick and Minnesota's 2016 second-round pick from New Orleans; January 9, 2015: Phoenix Suns to Boston Celtics: Phoenix acquired Brandan Wright; Boston acquired a Minnesota first-round pick (protected #1-12 through 2016, converts to Minnesota's 2016 second-round pick and 2017 second-round pick if unconveyed))	SMU (Jr.)
2	38	Jordan Bell	PF	United States	Chicago Bulls (from Sacramento via Cleveland, (Note: June 30, 2011: Sacramento Kings to Cleveland Cavaliers: Sacramento acquired JJ Hickson; Cleveland acquired Omri Casspi and Sacramento's protected 2012 first-round pick; the pick rolled over through 2017, when it was converted to Sacramento's 2017 second-round pick; January 6, 2014: Cleveland Cavaliers to Chicago Bulls: Cleveland acquired Luol Deng; Chicago acquired Andrew Bynum, Sacramento's protected first-round pick, the option to swap 2015 first-round picks, Portland's 2015 second-round pick and Portland's 2016 second-round pick) traded to Golden State Warriors) (Note: June 22, 2017: Chicago Bulls to Golden State: Golden State acquired Chicago's second-round pick (No. 38); Chicago received cash considerations)	Oregon (Jr.)
2	39	Jawun Evans	PG	United States	Philadelphia 76ers (from Dallas, (Note: February 23, 2017: Dallas Mavericks to Philadelphia 76ers: Dallas acquired Nerlens Noel; Philadelphia acquired Andrew Bogut, Justin Anderson, and Dallas's 2017 first-round pick (protected #1-18, converts to Dallas's 2017 second-round pick and Dallas's 2020 second-round pick if not conveyed)) traded to Los Angeles Clippers) (Note: June 22, 2017: Philadelphia 76ers to Los Angeles Clippers: Clippers acquired Philadelphia' second-round pick (No. 39); Philadelphia received cash considerations)	Oklahoma State (So.)
2	40	Dwayne Bacon	SG	United States	New Orleans Pelicans (traded to Charlotte Hornets)	Florida State (So.)
2	41	Tyler Dorsey	SG	Greece (Note: Tyler Dorsey was born and raised in the United States, but had acquired Greek dual citizenship due to his mother being Greek; Dorsey also represented Greece due to his citizenship under the name of Tailer Ntorsey.)	Atlanta Hawks (from Charlotte)	Oregon (So.)
2	42	Thomas Bryant	PF	United States	Utah Jazz (from Detroit, (Note: February 19, 2015: Detroit Pistons to Utah Jazz (three-team trade with Oklahoma City Thunder): Detroit acquired Reggie Jackson from Oklahoma City; Oklahoma City acquired Enes Kanter and Steve Novak from Utah; D. J. Augustin and Kyle Singler from Detroit, and Detroit's 2019 second-round pick; Utah acquired Kendrick Perkins, Grant Jerrett and draft rights to Tibor Pleiß from Oklahoma City, Oklahoma City's protected first-round pick (conveyance minimum of two years after first-round pick sent to Philadelphia, which happened in 2016), and Detroit's 2017 second-round pick) traded to Los Angeles Lakers)	Indiana (So.)
2	43	Isaiah Hartenstein	PF/C	Germany (Note: Isaiah Hartenstein was born and raised in Eugene, Oregon, but holds German citizenship with his father being a former professional player there.)	Houston Rockets (from Denver) (Note: July 20, 2015: Denver Nuggets to Houston Rockets: Houston acquired Ty Lawson and Denver's 2017 second-round pick; Denver acquired Joey Dorsey, Nick Johnson, Kostas Papanikolaou, Pablo Prigioni, Houston's 2016 lottery-protected first-round pick, and cash considerations)	Žalgiris (Lithuania)
2	44	Damyean Dotson	SG	United States	New York Knicks (from Chicago) (Note: June 22, 2016: Chicago Bulls to New York Knicks: Chicago acquired José Calderón, Jerian Grant, and Robin Lopez; New York acquired Justin Holiday, Derrick Rose, and Chicago's 2017 second-round pick)	Houston (Sr.)
2	45	Dillon Brooks	SF	Canada	Houston Rockets (from Portland, (Note: July 10, 2013: Portland Trail Blazers to Houston Rockets: Houston acquired draft rights to #45 Marko Todorović, draft rights to 2012 #48 Kostas Papanikolaou, and two future second-round picks; Portland acquired Thomas Robinson) traded to Memphis Grizzlies) (Note: June 22, 2017: Houston Rockets to Memphis Grizzlies: Memphis acquired Houston's second-round pick (No. 45); Houston acquired a future second-round selection from Memphis)	Oregon (Jr.)
2	46	Sterling Brown	SG	United States	Philadelphia 76ers (from Miami via Atlanta) (Note: June 28, 2013: Miami Heat to Atlanta Hawks: Miami acquired draft rights to James Ennis (#50); Atlanta acquired a 2017 second-round pick) (Note: February 23, 2017: Atlanta Hawks to Philadelphia 76ers: Atlanta acquired Ersan İlyasova; Philadelphia acquired Tiago Splitter, Miami's protected 2017 second-round draft pick, and the right to swap Atlanta's 2017 second-round pick for the worse of the two picks Philadelphia acquired from Utah) traded to Milwaukee Bucks) (Note: June 22, 2017: Philadelphia 76ers to Milwaukee Bucks: Milwaukee acquired Philadelphia' second-round pick (No. 46); Philadelphia received cash considerations)	SMU (Sr.)
2	47	Ike Anigbogu	C	United States	Indiana Pacers	UCLA (Fr.)
2	48	Sindarius Thornwell	SG	United States	Milwaukee Bucks (traded to Los Angeles Clippers) (Note: June 22, 2017: Milwaukee Bucks to Los Angeles Clippers: Los Angeles Clippers acquire Milwaukee's second-round pick (No. 48); Milwaukee receives cash considerations)	South Carolina (Sr.)
2	49	Vlatko Čančar	SF	Slovenia	Denver Nuggets (from Memphis via Oklahoma City) (Note: January 7, 2014: Boston Celtics to Oklahoma City Thunder: Boston acquired Jerryd Bayless (from Memphis) and Ryan Gomes (from Oklahoma City); Memphis acquired Courtney Lee (from Boston), a 2016 second-round pick (from Boston), and cash considerations (from Oklahoma City); Oklahoma City acquired Philadelphia's 2014 second-round pick and a 2017 conditional second-round pick, both from Memphis; August 30, 2016: Oklahoma City Thunder to Denver Nuggets: Oklahoma City acquired Joffrey Lauvergne; Denver acquired Memphis's 2017 second-round pick and Oklahoma City's 2017 second-round pick)	Mega Leks (Serbia)
2	50	Mathias Lessort^{#}	PF/C	France (Note: Mathias Lessort was born in Martinique, a French possession in the Caribbean. It is an overseas department with the same political status as departments within metropolitan France.)	Philadelphia 76ers (from Atlanta)	Nanterre 92 (France)
2	51	Monté Morris	PG	United States (Note: Morris acquired Nigerian citizenship by naturalization in 2021.)	Denver Nuggets (from Oklahoma City)	Iowa State (Sr.)
2	52	Edmond Sumner	PG	United States	New Orleans Pelicans (from Washington, (Note: June 21, 2017: Washington Wizards to New Orleans Pelicans: Washington acquired Tim Frazier; New Orleans acquired the 52nd pick of the draft) traded to Indiana Pacers) (Note: June 22, 2017: New Orleans Pelicans to Indiana Pacers: Pacers acquired New Orleans' second-round pick (No. 52); New Orleans received cash considerations)	Xavier (Jr.)
2	53	Kadeem Allen	SG	United States	Boston Celtics (from Cleveland) (Note: September 25, 2014: Cleveland Cavaliers to Boston Celtics: Boston acquired Keith Bogans, Cleveland's 2016 second-round pick, and Cleveland's 2017 second-round pick; Cleveland acquired John Lucas III, Erik Murphy, Dwight Powell, Malcolm Thomas, Sacramento's 2015 protected second-round pick, and Sacramento's 2017 protected second-round pick; both picks are protected #31-55)	Arizona (Sr.)
2	54	Alec Peters	SF	United States	Phoenix Suns (from Toronto) (Note: February 22, 2017: Toronto Raptors to Phoenix Suns: Toronto acquired P. J. Tucker; Phoenix acquired Jared Sullinger, Toronto's 2017 second-round pick, Toronto's 2018 second-round pick, and cash considerations)	Valparaiso (Sr.)
2	55	Nigel Williams-Goss	PG	United States	Utah Jazz	Gonzaga (Jr.)
2	56	Jabari Bird	SG	United States	Boston Celtics (from L.A. Clippers) (Note: January 15, 2015: Los Angeles Clippers to Boston Celtics (three-team trade with Phoenix Suns): Boston acquired Shavlik Randolph and a $2.4M trade exception from Phoenix, Chris Douglas-Roberts and a 2017 second-round pick from Los Angeles; Los Angeles acquired Austin Rivers from Boston; Phoenix acquired Reggie Bullock from Los Angeles)	California (Sr.)
2	57	Sasha Vezenkov	PF	Bulgaria (Note: Sasha Vezenkov was born in Cyprus and was raised in Greek communities in both Cyprus and Greece, but represents Bulgaria in international competitions.)	Brooklyn Nets (from Boston)	FC Barcelona Lassa (Spain)
2	58	Ognjen Jaramaz^{#}	PG	Serbia	New York Knicks (from Houston) (Note: February 19, 2015: Houston Rockets to New York Knicks: New York acquired Alexey Shved, Houston's 2017 second-round pick, and Houston's 2019 second-round pick; Houston acquired Pablo Prigioni)	Mega Leks (Serbia)
2	59	Jaron Blossomgame	SF	United States	San Antonio Spurs	Clemson (Sr.)
2	60	Alpha Kaba^{#}	PF/C	Guinea (Note: Kaba was born in France and represented France in youth tournaments. He plays for the Guinea national basketball team at the senior level.)	Atlanta Hawks (from Golden State via Philadelphia and Utah)	Mega Leks (Serbia)

== Notable undrafted players ==
These players were not selected in the 2017 NBA Draft, but have played at least one game in the NBA during the regular season or the NBA playoffs.

Player	Pos.	Nationality	School/club team
Jamel Artis	SG/SF	United States	Pittsburgh (Sr.)
Paris Bass	SF	United States	Erie BayHawks (NBA D-League)
Antonio Blakeney	PG	United States	LSU (So.)
Chris Boucher	PF/C	Canada; Saint Lucia (Note: Boucher was born in Saint Lucia and raised in Canada. He holds dual citizenship but is yet to play for either country internationally.)	Oregon (Sr.)
Amida Brimah	C	Ghana	UConn (Sr.)
Isaiah Briscoe	PG	United States	Kentucky (So.)
Deonte Burton	SG	United States	Iowa State (Sr.)
Troy Caupain	PG	United States	Cincinnati (Sr.)
Tyler Cavanaugh	PF	United States	George Washington (Sr.)
Gian Clavell	SG	Puerto Rico	Colorado State (Sr.)
Antonius Cleveland	SG	United States	Southeast Missouri State (Sr.)
Chance Comanche	PF/C	United States	Arizona (So.)
Charles Cooke	SG	United States	Dayton (Sr.)
Gabriel Deck	SF/PF	Argentina	San Lorenzo de Almagro (Argentina)
Milton Doyle	SG	United States	Loyola (Illinois) (Sr.)
PJ Dozier	SG	United States	South Carolina (So.)
Simone Fontecchio	SF	Italy	Vanoli Cremona (Italy)
Billy Garrett Jr.	SG	United States	DePaul (Sr.)
Marko Gudurić	SG/SF	Serbia	Crvena zvezda (Serbia)
Dusty Hannahs	SG	United States	Arkansas (Sr.)
Nigel Hayes	F	United States	Wisconsin (Sr.)
Isaiah Hicks	PF	United States	North Carolina (Sr.)
Malcolm Hill	SF	United States	Illinois (Sr.)
Isaac Humphries	C	Australia	Kentucky (So.)
Amile Jefferson	PF	United States	Duke (Sr.)
Luke Kornet	PF/C	United States	Vanderbilt (Sr.)
Mangok Mathiang	PF/C	Australia (Note: Mathiang was born in Sudan and raised in Australia. He holds dual citizenship of South Sudan and Australia. Mathiang debuted for the Australia national basketball team in 2019. He joined the South Sudan national basketball team in 2023.)	Louisville (Sr.)
Tahjere McCall	SG	United States	Tennessee State (Sr.)
Erik McCree	PF	United States	Louisiana Tech (Sr.)
Eric Mika	PF/C	United States	BYU (So.)
Naz Mitrou-Long	PG/SG	Greece (Note: Mitrou-Long was born in Canada to a Trinidadian father and Greek mother; he holds Canadian, Trinidadian and Greek citizenship. He plays for the Greece national basketball team.)	Iowa State (Sr.)
Xavier Moon	SG	United States	Morehead State (Sr.)
Ben Moore	SF	United States	SMU (Sr.)
Jaylen Morris	SG	United States	Molloy College (Sr.)
Johnathan Motley	PF	United States	Baylor (Jr.)
Mychal Mulder	SG	Canada	Kentucky (Sr.)
Cameron Oliver	F	United States	Nevada (So.)
Trayvon Palmer	SG	United States	Chicago State (Sr.)
London Perrantes	PG	United States	Virginia (Sr.)
Rodney Purvis	SG	United States	Connecticut (Sr.)
Xavier Rathan-Mayes	SG	Canada	Florida State (Jr.)
Devin Robinson	SF	United States	Florida (Jr.)
Kobi Simmons	PG	United States	Arizona (Fr.)
Matt Thomas	SG	United States	Iowa State (Sr.)
Luca Vildoza	PG/SG	Argentina	Saski Baskonia (Spain)
Ish Wainright	PF	United States (Note: Wainright became a naturalized Ugandan citizen in 2020 and plays for the Uganda national basketball team.)	Baylor (Sr.)
Derrick Walton	PG	United States	Michigan (Sr.)
Paul Watson	SG	United States	Fresno State (Sr.)
Andrew White	SF	United States	Syracuse (Sr.)
Jacob Wiley	SF	United States	Eastern Washington (Sr.)
Matt Williams	SG	United States	UCF (Sr.)

== Eligibility and entrants ==
The draft was conducted under the eligibility rules established in the league's 2017 collective bargaining agreement (CBA) with its players' union. The CBA that ended the 2011 lockout instituted no immediate changes to the draft, but called for a committee of owners and players to discuss future changes.

- All drafted players must have been at least 19 years old during the calendar year of the draft. In terms of dates, players who are eligible for the 2017 draft, must have been born on or before December 31, 1998.
- Since the 2016 draft, the NCAA Division I council implemented the following rules for that division that significantly changed the draft landscape for college players:
  - Declaration for the draft no longer resulted in automatic loss of college eligibility. As long as a player did not sign a contract with a professional team outside the NBA, or sign with an agent, he retained college eligibility as long as he made a timely withdrawal from the draft.
  - NCAA players had until 10 days after the end of the NBA Draft Combine to withdraw from the draft. Since the combine was held in mid-May, the deadline was about five weeks after the previous mid-April deadline.
  - NCAA players were permitted to participate in the draft combine, and were also allowed to attend one tryout per year with each NBA team without losing college eligibility.
  - NCAA players were permitted to enter and withdraw from the draft up to two times without loss of eligibility. Previously, the NCAA treated a second declaration of draft eligibility as a permanent loss of college eligibility.

The NBA has since expanded the draft combine to include players with remaining college eligibility (who, like players without college eligibility, can only attend by invitation).

=== Early entrants ===
Players who were not automatically eligible for the draft had to declare their eligibility by notifying the NBA offices in writing no later than 60 days before the draft. For the 2017 draft, this date fell on April 23. After that date "early entry" players were able to attend NBA pre-draft camps and individual team workouts to show off their skills and obtain feedback regarding their draft positions. Under the CBA, a player could withdraw from consideration from the draft at any time before the final declaration date, which was 10 days before the draft. Under NCAA rules, players had until May 24 (10 days after the draft combine) to withdraw from the draft and retain college eligibility.

A player who hired an agent forfeited his remaining college eligibility regardless of whether he was drafted.

==== College underclassmen ====
At the time, a record-high 185 underclassed draft prospects (i.e., players with remaining college eligibility) had declared themselves for eligibility at the April 24 deadline (138 of them being from college), although college players who had not hired agents or signed professional contracts outside the NBA were able to decide to return to college by May 24, 10 days after the end of the NBA Draft Combine. These players have publicly indicated that they have hired agents, or had planned to do so around the start of the draft; those who hired agents immediately lost their eligibility to return to NCAA basketball in 2017–18. By the end of the May 24 deadline, 73 draft candidates from college decided to return to their respective colleges for at least another year, leaving 64 underclassmen to officially enter the draft this year. Additionally, two more players left entry at the end of the international player deadline, meaning both Maverick Rowan from North Carolina State and Darin Johnson from Cal State Northridge would not return for college, but one player managed to enter the college underclassman deadline, thus leaving 63 entries at hand for the NBA Draft.

- (United States) Bam Adebayo – F, Kentucky (freshman)
- (United States) Jarrett Allen – F, Texas (freshman)
- (United States) Ike Anigbogu – F, UCLA (freshman)
- (England) / (Nigeria) O.G. Anunoby – F, Indiana (sophomore)
- (United States) Dwayne Bacon – G, Florida State (sophomore)
- (United States) Lonzo Ball – G, UCLA (freshman)
- (United States) Jordan Bell – F, Oregon (junior)
- (United States) James Blackmon Jr. – G, Indiana (junior)
- (United States) Antonio Blakeney – G, LSU (sophomore)
- (United States) Tony Bradley – F, North Carolina (freshman)
- (United States) Isaiah Briscoe – G, Kentucky (sophomore)
- (Canada) Dillon Brooks – F, Oregon (junior)
- (United States) Thomas Bryant – C, Indiana (sophomore)
- (United States) Clandell Cetoute – F, Thiel College (junior)
- (United States) John Collins – F, Wake Forest (sophomore)
- (United States) Zach Collins – F/C, Gonzaga (freshman)
- (United States) Chance Comanche – C, Arizona (sophomore)
- (United States) / (Greece) Tyler Dorsey – G, Oregon (sophomore)
- (United States) PJ Dozier – G, South Carolina (sophomore)
- (United States) Jawun Evans – G, Oklahoma State (sophomore)
- (United States) Tony Farmer – F, Lee College (sophomore)
- (United States) De'Aaron Fox – G, Kentucky (freshman)
- (United States) Markelle Fultz – G, Washington (freshman)
- (United States) Harry Giles – F, Duke (freshman)
- (Australia) Isaac Humphries – C, Kentucky (sophomore)
- (United States) Tre Hunter – G, Mount San Jacinto College (junior)
- (United States) Jonathan Isaac – F, Florida State (freshman)
- (United States) Frank Jackson – G, Duke (freshman)
- (United States) Josh Jackson – F, Kansas (freshman)
- (United States) Justin Jackson – F, North Carolina (junior)
- (United States) Jaylen Johnson – F, Louisville (junior)
- (Democratic Republic of the Congo) Ted Kapita – F, NC State (freshman)
- (United States) Marcus Keene – G, Central Michigan (junior)
- (United States) Luke Kennard – G, Duke (sophomore)
- (United States) Kyle Kuzma – F, Utah (junior)
- (Israel) / (United States) T. J. Leaf – F, UCLA (freshman)
- (United States) Tyler Lydon – F, Syracuse (sophomore)
- (United States) Elijah Macon – F, West Virginia (junior)
- (Finland) Lauri Markkanen – F, Arizona (freshman)
- (United States) Eric Mika – F, BYU (sophomore)
- (United States) Donovan Mitchell – G, Louisville (sophomore)
- (United States) Malik Monk – G, Kentucky (freshman)
- (United States) Johnathan Motley – F, Baylor (junior)
- (United States) Austin Nichols – F, Virginia (junior)
- (United States) / (Nigeria) Semi Ojeleye – F, SMU (junior)
- (United States) Cameron Oliver – F, Nevada (sophomore)
- (United States) Justin Patton – C, Creighton (freshman)
- (United States) L. J. Peak – G, Georgetown (junior)
- (United States) Ivan Rabb – F, California (sophomore)
- (Canada) Xavier Rathan-Mayes – G, Florida State (junior)
- (United States) Devin Robinson – F, Florida (junior)
- (United States) Josh Robinson – G, Austin Peay (junior)
- (United States) Kobi Simmons – G, Arizona (freshman)
- (United States) / (Kosovo) Jaren Sina – G, George Washington (junior)
- (United States) Dennis Smith Jr. – G, NC State (freshman)
- (United States) Edmond Sumner – G, Xavier (junior)
- (United States) Caleb Swanigan – F, Purdue (sophomore)
- (United States) Jayson Tatum – F, Duke (freshman)
- (Canada) Matt Taylor – G, New Mexico State (junior)
- (United States) Trevor Thompson – C, Ohio State (junior)
- (United States) Melo Trimble – G, Maryland (junior)
- (United States) Craig Victor II – F, LSU (junior)
- (United States) Antone Warren – C, Antelope Valley (sophomore)
- (United States) Nigel Williams-Goss – G, Gonzaga (junior)
- (United States) D. J. Wilson – F, Michigan (junior)

==== International players ====
International players that had declared this year and did not previously declare in another prior year can also drop out of the draft about 10 days before the draft begins on June 12. Initially, there were 46 players who originally expressed interest entering the 2017 draft. At the end of the international deadline, 36 players wound up declining entry for the draft, leaving only 10 international players staying in the NBA Draft. As a result, 73 total underclassmen entered the 2017 NBA Draft.

- (Sweden) Simon Birgander – F/C, Calzados Robusta Clavijo (Spain)
- Luka Božić – G/F, KK Zagreb (Croatia)
- (Slovenia) Vlatko Čančar – F, Mega Leks (Serbia)
- Wesley Alves da Silva – F, Paulistano Corpore (Brazil)
- Georginho de Paula – G, Paulistano Corpore (Brazil)
- (Germany) Isaiah Hartenstein – C, Žalgiris Kaunas (Lithuania)
- Jonathan Jeanne – C, SLUC Nancy (France)
- (France) Alpha Kaba – F/C, Mega Leks (Serbia)
- (France) Tidjan Keita – F, Cégep de Thetford (Canada)
- Frank Ntilikina – G, SIG Strasbourg (France)

=== Automatically eligible entrants ===
Players who do not meet the criteria for "international" players are automatically eligible if they meet any of the following criteria:

- They have completed four years of their college eligibility.
- If they graduated from high school in the U.S., but did not enroll in a U.S. college or university, four years have passed since their high school class graduated.
- They have signed a contract with a professional basketball team outside of the NBA, anywhere in the world, and have played under that contract.

Players who meet the criteria for "international" players are automatically eligible if they meet any of the following criteria:

- They are least 22 years old during the calendar year of the draft. In terms of dates, players born on or before December 31, 1995, are automatically eligible for the 2017 draft.
- They have signed a contract with a professional basketball team outside of the NBA within the United States, and have played under that contract.

Other automatically eligible players
Player	Team	Note	Ref.
(United States) Paris Bass	Erie BayHawks (D-League)	Removed from Detroit in 2016; playing professionally since 2016–17 season	
(Australia) Jonah Bolden	Crvena zvezda (Serbia)	Left UCLA in 2016; playing professionally since 2016–17 season	
(United States) Terrance Ferguson	Adelaide 36ers (Australia)	Didn't attend college in 2016, playing professionally since 2016–17 season	
(United States) Lee Moore	Germani Basket Brescia (Italy)	Left UTEP in 2016; playing professionally since 2016–17 season	
(Senegal) Waly Niang	Long Island Nets (D-League)	International player who played for the Long Island Nets in 2016	

== Combine ==
The invitation-only NBA Draft Combine was held in Chicago from May 9 to 14. The on-court element of the combine took place on May 11 and 12. This year's event had Under Armour as its primary sponsor. A total of 67 players were invited for this year's NBA Draft Combine, with 5 more named as alternates in the event some players could not come for whatever reason. Ten invited players declined to attend for various reasons, including three players completely on the international scale. Eighteen more players that were guaranteed invitations were also players testing out their draft stocks during the event. Eleven players participating in the event were seniors, the lowest number ever of combine participants who had exhausted their college eligibility. During the event, six different players were deemed injured either before or during this year's Draft Combine. At the end of the May 24 college deadline, eight players who originally declared for the NBA Draft and were invited to the Draft Combine this year, including potential "none-and-done" Kentucky freshman redshirt Hamidou Diallo, ultimately returned to college for at least one more season.

== Draft lottery ==
External videos
- 2017 NBA Draft Lottery Drawing, NBA's official YouTube channel. May 16, 2017.

The 2017 NBA draft lottery was held on May 16.

Denotes the actual lottery result

Team	2016–17 record	Lottery chances	Lottery probabilities													
Team	2016–17 record	Lottery chances	1st	2nd	3rd	4th	5th	6th	7th	8th	9th	10th	11th	12th	13th	14th
Boston Celtics	53–29	250	.250	.215	.178	.357	–	–	–	–	–	–	–	–	–	–
Phoenix Suns	24–58	199	.199	.188	.171	.319	.123	–	–	–	–	–	–	–	–	–
Los Angeles Lakers	26–56	156	.156	.157	.156	.226	.265	.040	–	–	–	–	–	–	–	–
Philadelphia 76ers	28–54	119	.119	.126	.133	.099	.350	.161	.013	–	–	–	–	–	–	–
Orlando Magic	29–53	88	.088	.097	.107	–	.261	.359	.084	.004	–	–	–	–	–	–
Minnesota Timberwolves	31–51	53	.053	.060	.070	–	–	.439	.331	.045	.001	–	–	–	–	–
New York Knicks	31–51	53	.053	.060	.070	–	–	–	.572	.226	.018	.000	–	–	–	–
Sacramento Kings	32–50	28	.028	.033	.039	–	–	–	–	.725	.168	.008	.000	–	–	–
Dallas Mavericks	33–49	17	.017	.020	.024	–	–	–	–	–	.813	.122	.004	.000	–	–
New Orleans Pelicans	34–48	11	.011	.013	.016	–	–	–	–	–	–	.870	.089	.002	.000	–
Charlotte Hornets	36–46	8	.008	.009	.012	–	–	–	–	–	–	–	.907	.063	.001	.000
Detroit Pistons	37–45	7	.007	.008	.010	–	–	–	–	–	–	–	–	.935	.039	.000
Denver Nuggets	40–42	6	.006	.007	.009	–	–	–	–	–	–	–	–	–	.960	.018
Miami Heat	41–41	5	.005	.006	.007	–	–	–	–	–	–	–	–	–	–	.982

1: The Boston Celtics exercised the option to swap first-round picks with the 20–62 Brooklyn Nets on April 3, 2017. They traded the pick to the Philadelphia 76ers four days before the draft began.
2: The Philadelphia 76ers exercised the option to swap first-round picks with the Sacramento Kings after the names of the top three teams were revealed. It was then used to swap their own pick with Boston four days before the draft began.
3: The New Orleans Pelicans' first round pick was conveyed to the Sacramento Kings because it fell outside of the top three.

== Invited attendees ==
The NBA annually invites around 15–20 players to sit in the so-called "green room", a special room set aside at the draft site for the invited players plus their families and agents. When their names are called, the player leaves the room and goes up on stage. Other players who are not invited are allowed to attend the ceremony. They sit in the stands with the fans and walk up on stage when (or if) they are drafted. 10 players were invited to the 2017 NBA draft on June 8, with three more of them being invited two days later. Eight more players would be invited to complete the green room listing on June 14, bringing the total invite list to 21, with 20 of the invitees attending. The following players (listed alphabetically) were confirmed as invites for the event this year.

- (United States) Bam Adebayo, Kentucky (not on the original list, later invited)
- (United States) Jarrett Allen, Texas (not on the original list, later invited)
- (England) / (Nigeria) O.G. Anunoby, Indiana (not on the original list, later invited)
- (United States) Lonzo Ball, UCLA
- (United States) John Collins, Wake Forest (not on the original list, later invited)
- (United States) Zach Collins, Gonzaga
- (United States) De'Aaron Fox, Kentucky
- (United States) Markelle Fultz, Washington
- (United States) Harry Giles, Duke (not on the original list, later invited; declined invite)
- (United States) Jonathan Isaac, Florida State
- (United States) Josh Jackson, Kansas
- (United States) Justin Jackson, North Carolina (not on the original list, later invited)
- (United States) Luke Kennard, Duke (not on the original list, later invited)
- (Israel) / (United States) T. J. Leaf, UCLA (not on the original list, later invited)
- (Finland) Lauri Markkanen, Arizona
- (United States) Donovan Mitchell, Louisville (not on the original list, later invited)
- (United States) Malik Monk, Kentucky
- (France) Frank Ntilikina, SIG Strasbourg (not on the original list, later invited)
- (United States) Justin Patton, Creighton (not on the original list, later invited)
- (United States) Dennis Smith Jr., North Carolina State
- (United States) Jayson Tatum, Duke

== Trades involving draft picks ==
=== Pre-draft trades ===
Prior to the day of the draft, the following trades were made and resulted in exchanges of draft picks between the teams.

=== Draft-day trades ===
Draft-day trades occurred on June 22, 2017, the day of the draft.

== See also ==
- List of first overall NBA draft picks
