= Jayvon Graves =

American basketball player (born 1998)

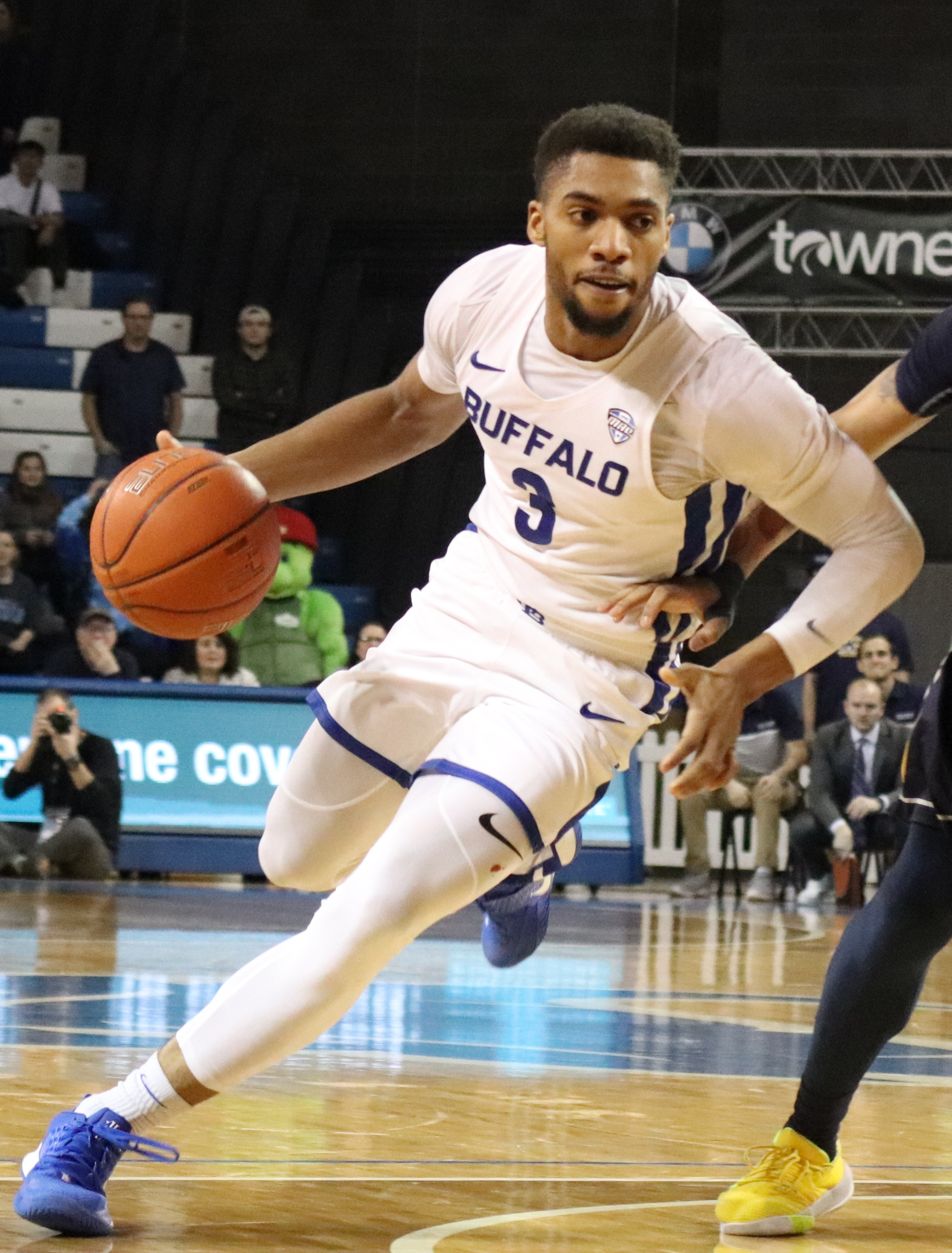
- Graves with Buffalo in 2020

No. 3 – Libertas Livorno
- Position: Point guard / shooting guard
- League: Serie A2

Personal information
- Born: December 29, 1998 (age 27) Canton, Ohio, U.S.
- Listed height: 6 ft 3 in (1.91 m)
- Listed weight: 200 lb (91 kg)

Career information
- High school: St. Vincent–St. Mary (Akron, Ohio)
- College: Buffalo (2017–2021)
- NBA draft: 2021: undrafted
- Playing career: 2021–present

Career history
- 2021–2022: Austin Spurs
- 2022–2023: Limoges CSP
- 2023–2024: Riesen Ludwigsburg
- 2024–2025: Rytas Vilnius
- 2025–2026: Legia Warsaw
- 2026–present: Libertas Livorno

Career highlights
- Polish League champion (2026); First-team All-MAC (2020); Second-team All-MAC (2021)

Jayvon Donnell Graves (born December 29, 1998) is an American professional basketball player for Libertas Livorno of the Italian Serie A2. He played college basketball for the Buffalo Bulls.

== High school career ==
Graves was born in Canton, Ohio but grew up in Malvern, Ohio. He began playing basketball at the age of six and was also a star player in baseball and football. He attended St. Vincent–St. Mary High School where he was coached by Dru Joyce II. As a senior, he helped St. Vincent-St. Mary to its first state title since 2011 and 25–5 record. He scored 22 points and grabbed 10 rebounds in the title game. Graves averaged 21.5 points, 4.9 rebounds, and 2.5 assists per game. He shared All-Ohio Player of the Year honors in Division II with Trotwood High School's Torrey Patton, and Graves was named cleveland.com Boys Basketball Player of the Year. In AAU play, he competed for the King James Shooting Stars. Graves was a three-star recruit with offers from 13 schools, including MAC schools Toledo and Kent State, but signed with Buffalo. He said he was drawn to the Bulls because of "the style of play, the atmosphere, closeness to home and the coaching staff," particularly Nate Oats.

== College career ==
As a freshman, Graves played in all 36 games and averaged 5.1 points and 2.3 rebounds per-game. He helped the team finish 27–9 and defeat Arizona in the first round of the NCAA Tournament. As a sophomore, he became a starter, contributing 9.7 points and 4.2 rebounds per game. Graves helped the Bulls finish a school-record 32–4 and defeat Arizona State in the first round of the NCAA Tournament before losing to eventual national runner-up Texas Tech. His best game as a sophomore came on February 19, 2019, when he tallied 26 points in a 114–67 blowout win over Ohio.

Coming into his junior season, Graves was the leading returning scorer on a team that lost C. J. Massinburg, Nick Perkins and Jeremy Harris to graduation. On February 21, 2020, Graves scored a career-high 33 points in a 104–98 double overtime win at Kent State. As a junior, Graves led Buffalo in scoring at 17.1 points per game in addition to averaging 5.4 rebounds and 2.5 assists per game in 32 games, all starts. He set the program record for field goals attempted in a season with 479, and his 204 made field goals are third highest in a season at Buffalo. He was named to the First Team All-MAC. Following the season, he declared for the 2020 NBA draft but did not hire an agent. On June 6, Graves announced he was withdrawing from the draft and returning to Buffalo. On March 2, 2021, he posted a triple-double with 13 points, 11 assists and 10 rebounds in an 80–78 win over Akron. As a senior, Graves averaged 14.2 points, 6.1 rebounds and 3.8 assists per game. He was named to the Second Team All-MAC.

== Professional career ==
=== Austin Spurs (2021–2022) ===
After going undrafted in the 2021 NBA draft, Graves signed with the Austin Spurs of the NBA G League on October 27, 2021.

=== Limoges CSP (2022–2023) ===
He signed with Limoges CSP of the LNB Pro A on July 30, 2022. On December 22, 2022, Graves' NBA G League rights were traded from the Austin Spurs to the Windy City Bulls.

=== Riesen Ludwigsburg (2023–2024) ===
On July 3, 2023, he signed with MHP Riesen Ludwigsburg of the Basketball Bundesliga.

=== Rytas Vilnius (2024–2025) ===
On July 25, 2024, Graves signed with Rytas Vilnius of the Lithuanian Basketball League (LKL) and the BCL.

=== Legia Warsaw (2025–present) ===
On July 26, 2025, Graves signed with Legia Warsaw of the Polish Basketball League (LKL) and the BCL.

== Career statistics ==
Legend
GP	Games played	GS	Games started	MPG	Minutes per game
FG%	Field goal percentage	3P%	3-point field goal percentage	FT%	Free throw percentage
RPG	Rebounds per game	APG	Assists per game	SPG	Steals per game
BPG	Blocks per game	PPG	Points per game	**Bold**	Career high

=== College ===
Year	Team	GP	GS	MPG	FG%	3P%	FT%	RPG	APG	SPG	BPG	PPG
2017–18	Buffalo	**36**	1	16.3	.380	.325	.600	2.3	1.0	.5	.8	5.1
2018–19	Buffalo	**36**	**35**	24.9	**.457**	**.372**	.625	4.2	1.9	.8	.8	9.7
2019–20	Buffalo	32	32	**34.4**	.426	.360	**.647**	5.4	2.5	1.2	.7	**17.1**
2020–21	Buffalo	25	25	**34.4**	.409	.281	.575	**6.1**	**3.8**	**1.4**	**.9**	14.2
Career		129	93	26.7	.422	.340	.615	4.3	2.2	.9	.8	11.1

== Personal life ==
Graves is the son of Brandy Prior and Aaron Graves, and he has an older brother Jalen. His grandfather, James Pryor Jr., was an Ohio state player of the year in high school. Graves is a Christian. He majored in communication with a minor in sociology at Buffalo. He cites LeBron James as his favorite athlete.
