= Blue Collar U =

American professional basketball team

- Leagues: The Basketball Tournament
- Founded: 2021
- History: Blue Collar U (2021–2023)
- Team colors: Blue and white
- General manager: Bryan Hodgson
- Head coach: Adam Bauman
- Assistants: Tom Fox, Wes Schier
- Ownership: Adam March
- Championships: 1 (2022)
- Website: Team page

Blue Collar U is a former American basketball team that participated in The Basketball Tournament (TBT), an annual winner-take-all single-elimination tournament. The team consists of professional basketball players, most of whom played college basketball for the Buffalo Bulls men's basketball team. The team began participating in TBT in 2021, reaching the semi-finals. Blue Collar U won its first TBT championship in its second year of participation in 2022, winning the $1 million grand prize. In 2024, the team announced they wouldn't compete in TBT anymore.

== History ==
=== 2021 ===
In TBT 2021, Blue Collar U played in the Columbus regional and was seeded 6th out of a field of 16 teams.

| Date | Round | Location | Score | Opponent | Ref. |
|---|---|---|---|---|---|
| July 24 | First round | Columbus, Ohio | 88–82 | The Nerd Team | |
| July 25 | Second round | Columbus, Ohio | 93–83 | Zip 'Em Up | |
| July 27 | Regional semi-finals | Columbus, Ohio | 78–61 | Category 5 | |
| July 31 | Regional finals | Dayton, Ohio | 84–81 | The Money Team | |
| August 1 | Semi-finals | Dayton, Ohio | 62–78 | Team 23 | |

=== 2022 ===
In TBT 2022, Blue Collar U played in the Syracuse regional and was seeded 2nd out of a field of 8 teams. Players wore the names of the victims of the 2022 Buffalo shooting on the backs of their jerseys in place of their own names. They won the Syracuse regional with victories over NG Saints, an alumni team for Neumann Goretti High School in Philadelphia, Friday Beers, and The Nerd Team, an alumni team of Ivy League and other highly prestigious schools. After defeating Heartfire in the quarterfinals, Blue Collar U won a true road game against Red Scare, an alumni team of Dayton Flyers men's basketball. They defeated Americana for Autism in the finals to win the $1 million grand prize.

| Date | Round | Location | Score | Opponent | Ref. |
|---|---|---|---|---|---|
| July 22 | First round | Syracuse, New York | 91–64 | NG Saints | |
| July 23 | Second round | Syracuse, New York | 78–75 | Friday Beers | |
| July 25 | Third round | Syracuse, New York | 83–62 | The Nerd Team | |
| July 29 | Quarter-finals | Dayton, Ohio | 74–66 | Heartfire | |
| July 30 | Semi-finals | Dayton, Ohio | 74–69 | Red Scare | |
| August 2 | Finals | Dayton, Ohio | 89–67 | Americana for Autism | |

=== 2023 ===
In TBT 2023, Blue Collar U played in the Syracuse regional and was seeded 1st out of a field of 8 teams. In the first round, Blue Collar U defeated Big 5, an alumni team composed mostly of Philadelphia Big 5 schools with the largest comeback in the history of the Elam Ending. After defeating Virginia Dream in the second round, they lost in the regional finals to Boeheim's Army, a team of primarily Syracuse Orange Basketball alumni.

| Date | Round | Location | Score | Opponent | Ref. |
|---|---|---|---|---|---|
| July 24 | First round | Syracuse, New York | 78–77 | Big 5 | |
| July 26 | Second round | Syracuse, New York | 107–86 | Virginia Dream | |
| July 28 | Regional finals | Syracuse, New York | 54–69 | Boeheim's Army | |

== Roster ==
Blue Collar U roster
Players
Coaches

| Pos. | No. | Nat. | Name | Ht. | Wt. | DOB (YYYY-MM-DD) |
|---|---|---|---|---|---|---|
| SF | 0 | (United States) | Blake Hamilton | 6 ft 6 in (1.98 m) | 205 lb (93 kg) | 1994-10-26 |
| PG | 1 | (United States) | Lamonte Bearden | 6 ft 3 in (1.91 m) | 170 lb (77 kg) | 1995-10-30 |
| SF | 2 | (United States) | Jeremy Harris | 6 ft 7 in (2.01 m) | 185 lb (84 kg) | 1996-09-10 |
| PG | 3 | (United States) | Antwain Johnson | 6 ft 2 in (1.88 m) | 197 lb (89 kg) | 1997-02-22 |
| PG | 4 | (United States) | Davonta Jordan | 6 ft 2 in (1.88 m) | 187 lb (85 kg) | 1997-05-12 |
| SG | 5 | (United States) | C. J. Massinburg | 6 ft 5 in (1.96 m) | 202 lb (92 kg) | 1997-04-14 |
| SG | 11 | (United States) | Antwon Lillard | 6 ft 6 in (1.98 m) | 200 lb (91 kg) | 1995-11-06 |
| PG | 15 | (United States) | Wes Clark | 6 ft 0 in (1.83 m) | 183 lb (83 kg) | 1994-12-12 |
| PG | 22 | (United States) | Dontay Caruthers | 6 ft 1 in (1.85 m) | 190 lb (86 kg) | 1995-06-23 |
| C | 33 | (United States) | Nick Perkins | 6 ft 8 in (2.03 m) | 249 lb (113 kg) | 1996-10-15 |
| SF | 43 | (United States) | Xavier Ford | 6 ft 8 in (2.03 m) | 175 lb (79 kg) | 1993-01-20 |
| C | 93 | (United States) | Montell McRae | 6 ft 10 in (2.08 m) | 198 lb (90 kg) | 1996-01-25 |

Head coach

- Adam Bauman

Assistant coach(es)

- Wes Scheier
- Tom Fox
- Edric Dennis Jr.

Team manager

- Bryan Hodgson

Legend

- (C) Team captain
- Injured

- Roster
Updated: July 23, 2023

== Awards ==
| Year | Player | Award | Ref |
|---|---|---|---|
| 2021 | Nick Perkins | All-Tournament Team | |
| 2022 | Nick Perkins | All-Tournament Team | |
| 2022 | Wes Clark | All-Tournament Team | |
| 2022 | Adam Bauman | All-Tournament Team (coach) | |
| 2022 | C. J. Massinburg | All-Tournament Team & MVP | |
