= 2017–18 Buffalo Bulls men's basketball team =

American college basketball season

2017–18 Buffalo Bulls men's basketball

MAC tournament champions MAC East division champions MAC regular season champions

NCAA tournament, Second Round
- Conference: Mid-American Conference
- East Division
- Record: 27–9 (15–3 MAC)
- Head coach: Nate Oats (3rd season)
- Assistant coaches: Jim Whitesell (3rd season); Bryan Hodgson (3rd season); Jamie Quarles (1st season)
- Home arena: Alumni Arena

2017–18 Mid-American Conference men's basketball standings
	Conf.				Overall
Team	W		L	PCT	W		L	PCT
East
Buffalo †	15	–	3	.833	27	–	9	.750
Kent State	9	–	9	.500	17	–	17	.500
Miami (OH)	8	–	10	.444	16	–	18	.471
Bowling Green	7	–	11	.389	16	–	16	.500
Ohio	7	–	11	.389	14	–	17	.452
Akron	6	–	12	.333	14	–	18	.438
West
Toledo	13	–	5	.722	23	–	11	.676
Eastern Michigan	11	–	7	.611	22	–	13	.629
Ball State	10	–	8	.556	19	–	13	.594
Western Michigan	9	–	9	.500	17	–	15	.531
Central Michigan	7	–	11	.389	21	–	15	.583
Northern Illinois	6	–	12	.333	13	–	19	.406
† 2018 MAC tournament winner

The 2017–18 Buffalo Bulls men's basketball team represented the State University of New York at Buffalo during the 2017–18 NCAA Division I men's basketball season. The Bulls, led by third-year head coach Nate Oats, played their home games at Alumni Arena in Amherst, New York as members of the East Division of the Mid-American Conference. They finished the season 27–9, 15–3 in MAC play to win the MAC East Division and regular season championships. they defeated Central Michigan, Kent State, and Toledo to win the MAC tournament championship. As a result, they received the conference's automatic bid to the NCAA tournament. As the No. 13 seed in the South region, they upset Arizona in the First Round before losing to Kentucky in the Second Round.

== Previous season ==
The Bulls finished the 2016–17 season 17–14, 11–7 in MAC play to finish in a tie for second place in the East Division. As the No. 3 seed in the MAC tournament, they lost in the quarterfinals to Kent State.

== Offseason ==
=== 2017 recruiting class ===
College recruiting information
Name	Hometown	School	Height	Weight	Commit date
James Reese; SG	Columbia, SC	A. C. Flora High School	6 ft 3 in (1.91 m)	185 lb (84 kg)	Oct 1, 2016
James Reese; SG	Recruit ratings: Scout: Rivals: (NR)				
Overall recruit ranking:
Note: In many cases, Scout, Rivals, 247Sports, On3, and ESPN may conflict in their listings of height and weight.; In these cases, the average was taken. ESPN grades are on a 100-point scale.; Sources: "2017 Team Ranking". Rivals.

== Roster ==
2017–18 Buffalo Bulls men's basketball team
Players
Coaches

Pos.	#	Name	Height	Weight	Year	Previous school	Hometown
G	0	James Reese	6 ft 4 in (1.93 m)	167 lb (76 kg)	Fr	A.C. Flora	Eastover, SC
F	1	Montrell McRae	6 ft 10 in (2.08 m)	198 lb (90 kg)	Jr	Cleveland Central Catholic; South Plains College	Cleveland, OH
G/F	2	Jeremy Harris	6 ft 7 in (2.01 m)	176 lb (80 kg)	Jr	Page; Gulf Coast State College	Greensboro, NC
G	3	Jayvon Graves	6 ft 3 in (1.91 m)	193 lb (88 kg)	Fr	St. Vincent–St. Mary	Malvern, OH
G	4	Davonta Jordan	6 ft 2 in (1.88 m)	185 lb (84 kg)	So	Montverde Academy	Cocoa, FL
G	5	C. J. Massinburg	6 ft 3 in (1.91 m)	194 lb (88 kg)	Jr	South Oak Cliff	Dallas, TX
G	10	Wes Clark	6 ft 0 in (1.83 m)	177 lb (80 kg)	Sr	Romulus; Missouri	Detroit, MI
G	20	Colby Moultrie	6 ft 3 in (1.91 m)	190 lb (86 kg)	Fr	Canisius	North Tonawanda, NY
F	21	Dominic Johnson	6 ft 5 in (1.96 m)	230 lb (104 kg)	RS Fr	Catholic Central	Windsor, ON
G	22	Dontay Caruthers	6 ft 1 in (1.85 m)	195 lb (88 kg)	RS Jr	East; Midland/Indian Hills	Rochester, NY
F	24	Gabe Agorioge	6 ft 4 in (1.93 m)	233 lb (106 kg)	Sr	Transit Tech; Hostos CC	Brooklyn, NY
F	33	Nick Perkins	6 ft 8 in (2.03 m)	250 lb (113 kg)	Jr	Milan HS	Ypsilanti, MI
F	34	Ikenna Smart	6 ft 10 in (2.08 m)	241 lb (109 kg)	RS Jr	New Garden Friends School	Greensboro, NC
C	41	Brock Bertram	6 ft 11 in (2.11 m)	250 lb (113 kg)	So	Apple Valley	Apple Valley, MN

Head coach

- Nate Oats (Maranatha Baptist)

Assistant coach(es)

- Jim Whitesell (Luther)
- Bryan Hodgson (Fredonia State)
- Jamie Quarles (Augusta State)

Legend

- (C) Team captain
- (S) Suspended
- (I) Ineligible
- (W) Walk-on
- Injured
- Current redshirt

Roster

== Schedule and results ==
The Bulls participated in the Cayman Islands Classic held in the Cayman Islands and faced Cincinnati in their first game. The three-game tournament took place between November 20 and 22.

Date time, TV	Rank^{#}	Opponent^{#}	Result	Record	High points	High rebounds	High assists	Site (attendance) city, state
Exhibition
Oct 28, 2017*; 1:00 pm		at Rhode Island; Charity Exhibition for Disaster Relief	L 72–80 ^{OT}	–	21 – Harris	11 – McRae	3 – Tied	Ryan Center (1,363); Kingston, RI
Nov 3, 2017*; 8:00 pm, ESPN3		Daemen	W 77–55	–	20 – Perkins	11 – Harris	6 – Caruthers	Alumni Arena; Amherst, NY
Non-conference regular season
Nov 11, 2017*; 1:00 pm, ESPN3		Canisius	W 80–75	1–0	26 – Perkins	8 – Jordan	3 – Caruthers	Alumni Arena (3,279); Amherst, NY
Nov 15, 2017*; 7:00 pm, ESPN3		Jacksonville State	W 81–76	2–0	25 – Massinburg	7 – Massinburg	5 – Massinburg	Alumni Arena (2,319); Amherst, NY
Nov 20, 2017*; 7:30 pm, FloHoops.com		vs. No. 12 Cincinnati; Cayman Islands Classic first round	L 67–73	2–1	29 – Massinburg	10 – Massinburg	4 – Jordan	John Gray Gymnasium (1,200); Cayman Islands
Nov 21, 2017*; 5:00 pm, FloHoops.com		vs. UAB; Cayman Islands Classic consolation round	W 96–91 ^{OT}	3–1	23 – Caruthers	7 – Caruthers	6 – Jordan	John Gray Gymnasium (404); Cayman Islands
Nov 22, 2017*; 2:30 pm, FloHoops.com		vs. South Dakota State; Cayman Islands Classic 5th place game	L 80–94	3–2	17 – Perkins	4 – Tied	5 – Tied	John Gray Gymnasium (450); Cayman Islands
Nov 29, 2017*; 7:00 pm		at Niagara	W 106–87	4–2	25 – Massinburg	8 – Massinburg	7 – Jordan	Gallagher Center (1,664); Lewiston, NY
Dec 2, 2017*; 2:00 pm		St. Bonaventure	L 62–73	4–3	21 – Tied	8 – Tied	4 – Jordan	Alumni Arena (6,212); Amherst, NY
Dec 6, 2017*; 7:00 pm, CBSSN		at Delaware	W 75–72	5–3	30 – Massinburg	14 – Massinburg	4 – Jordan	Bob Carpenter Center (2,326); Newark, DE
Dec 9, 2017*; 2:00 pm, ESPN3		Central Penn	W 88–54	6–3	18 – Reese	11 – Massinburg	6 – Tied	Alumni Arena (2,225); Amherst, NY
Dec 16, 2017*; 2:00 pm		Robert Morris	W 86–70	7–3	23 – Massinburg	10 – Massinburg	7 – Jordan	Alumni Arena (2,158); Amherst, NY
Dec 19, 2017*; 7:00 pm, ACCN Extra		at Syracuse	L 74–81	7–4	18 – Perkins	8 – Massinburg	6 – Clark	Carrier Dome (17,335); Syracuse, NY
Dec 21, 2017*; 9:00 pm, SECN		at No. 8 Texas A&M	L 73–89	7–5	20 – Massinburg	8 – Massinburg	8 – Clark	Reed Arena (6,554); College Station, TX
Dec 28, 2017*; 7:00 pm		NJIT	W 86–81 ^{OT}	8–5	27 – Clark	10 – Massinburg	6 – Clark	Alumni Arena (2,111); Amherst, NY
MAC regular season
Jan 2, 2018; 7:00 pm, CBSSN		Toledo	W 104–94	9–5 (1–0)	27 – Massinburg	10 – Perkins	5 – Tied	Alumni Arena (1,100); Amherst, NY
Jan 6, 2018; 2:00 pm, ESPN3		at Ball State	W 83–63	10–5 (2–0)	16 – Tied	11 – Perkins	5 – Massinburg	Worthen Arena (3,622); Muncie, IN
Jan 9, 2018; 7:00 pm, ESPN3		at Akron	W 87–65	11–5 (3–0)	17 – Tied	12 – Massinburg	5 – Clark	James A. Rhodes Arena (2,924); Akron, OH
Jan 13, 2018; 2:00 pm		Miami (OH)	W 82–66	12–5 (4–0)	23 – Harris	11 – Massinburg	7 – Clark	Alumni Arena (3,139); Amherst, NY
Jan 16, 2018; 7:00 pm		Northern Illinois	W 95–67	13–5 (5–0)	26 – Perkins	7 – Smart	8 – Jordan	Alumni Arena (2,098); Amherst, NY
Jan 19, 2018; 7:00 pm, ESPNU		at Western Michigan	W 84–74	14–5 (6–0)	20 – Tied	8 – Massinburg	9 – Clark	University Arena (2,548); Kalamazoo, MI
Jan 23, 2018; 7:00 pm, ESPN3		Eastern Michigan	W 83–69	15–5 (7–0)	22 – Harris	14 – Harris	4 – Tied	Alumni Arena (2,966); Amherst, NY
Jan 26, 2018; 6:30 pm, CBSSN		at Ohio	W 73–66	16–5 (8–0)	20 – Perkins	14 – Smart	3 – Tied	Convocation Center (6,470); Athens, OH
Jan 30, 2018; 7:00 pm, ESPN3		at Kent State	L 79–82	16–6 (8–1)	20 – Harris	4 – Harris	5 – Jordan	MAC Center (2,877); Kent, OH
Feb 2, 2018; 7:00 pm, CBSSN		Western Michigan	W 92–86	17–6 (9–1)	26 – Massinburg	6 – Tied	9 – Clark	Alumni Arena (6,670); Amherst, NY
Feb 6, 2018; 7:00 pm, ESPN3		at Central Michigan	W 88–82	18–6 (10–1)	22 – Harris	7 – Tied	6 – Clark	McGuirk Arena (1,979); Mount Pleasant, MI
Feb 10, 2018; 4:30 pm, ESPN3		at Northern Illinois	L 88–90 ^{OT}	18–7 (10–2)	22 – Perkins	9 – Perkins	5 – Jordan	Convocation Center (1,565); DeKalb, IL
Feb 13, 2018; 7:00 pm, ESPN3		Kent State	W 84–72	19–7 (11–2)	24 – Harris	10 – Perkins	7 – Massinburg	Alumni Arena (3,707); Amherst, NY
Feb 16, 2018; 7:00 pm, ESPNU		Bowling Green	W 95–82	20–7 (12–2)	24 – Massinburg	12 – Massinburg	8 – Jordan	Alumni Arena (5,707); Amherst, NY
Feb 20, 2018; 7:00 pm, ESPN3		at Miami (OH)	L 81–84	20–8 (12–3)	23 – Harris	8 – Harris	3 – Tied	Millett Hall (1,870); Oxford, OH
Feb 24, 2018; 3:30 pm, ESPN3		Ohio	W 108–82	21–8 (13–3)	21 – Perkins	10 – Harris	11 – Clark	Alumni Arena (6,198); Amherst, NY
Feb 27, 2018; 7:00 pm, ESPN3		Akron	W 80–68	22–8 (14–3)	26 – Massinburg	10 – Massinburg	5 – Clark	Alumni Arena (3,659); Amherst, NY
Mar 2, 2018; 6:00 pm, ESPNU		at Bowling Green	W 100–70	23–8 (15–3)	19 – Tied	9 – Perkins	6 – Jordan	Stroh Center (1,924); Bowling Green, OH
MAC Tournament
Mar 8, 2018; 12:00 pm, ESPN3	(1)	vs. (8) Central Michigan; Quarterfinals	W 89–74	24–8	27 – Harris	10 – Harris	8 – Caruthers	Quicken Loans Arena (2,023); Cleveland, OH
March 9, 2018; 6:30 pm, CBSSN	(1)	vs. (5) Kent State; Semifinals	W 78–61	25–8	22 – Harris	7 – Tied	4 – Clark	Quicken Loans Arena (4,625); Cleveland, OH
March 10, 2018; 7:00 pm, ESPN2	(1)	vs. (2) Toledo; Championship	W 76–66	26–8	26 – Clark	8 – Harris	4 – Jordan	Quicken Loans Arena (5,633); Cleveland, OH
NCAA tournament
March 15, 2018*; 9:40 pm, CBS	(13 S)	vs. (4 S) No. 12 Arizona; First Round	W 89–68	27–8	25 – Clark	6 – Massinburg	7 – Clark	Taco Bell Arena (11,673); Boise, ID
March 17, 2018*; 5:15 pm, CBS	(13 S)	vs. (5 S) No. 18 Kentucky; Second Round	L 75–95	27–9	26 – Clark	8 – Massinburg	6 – Clark	Taco Bell Arena (11,686); Boise, ID
*Non-conference game. ^{#}Rankings from AP Poll. (#) Tournament seedings in parentheses. S=South. All times are in Eastern Time.

== Rankings ==
Ranking movements Legend: ██ Increase in ranking ██ Decrease in ranking — = Not ranked RV = Received votes
	Week																			
Poll	Pre	1	2	3	4	5	6	7	8	9	10	11	12	13	14	15	16	17	18	Final
AP	—	—	—	—	—	—	—	—	—	—	—	—	—	—	—	—	—	RV	RV	Not released
Coaches	—	—	—	—	—	—	—	—	—	—	—	—	—	—	—	—	—	—	—	RV

*AP does not release post-NCAA tournament rankings
