= Jarryn Skeete =

Canadian basketball player

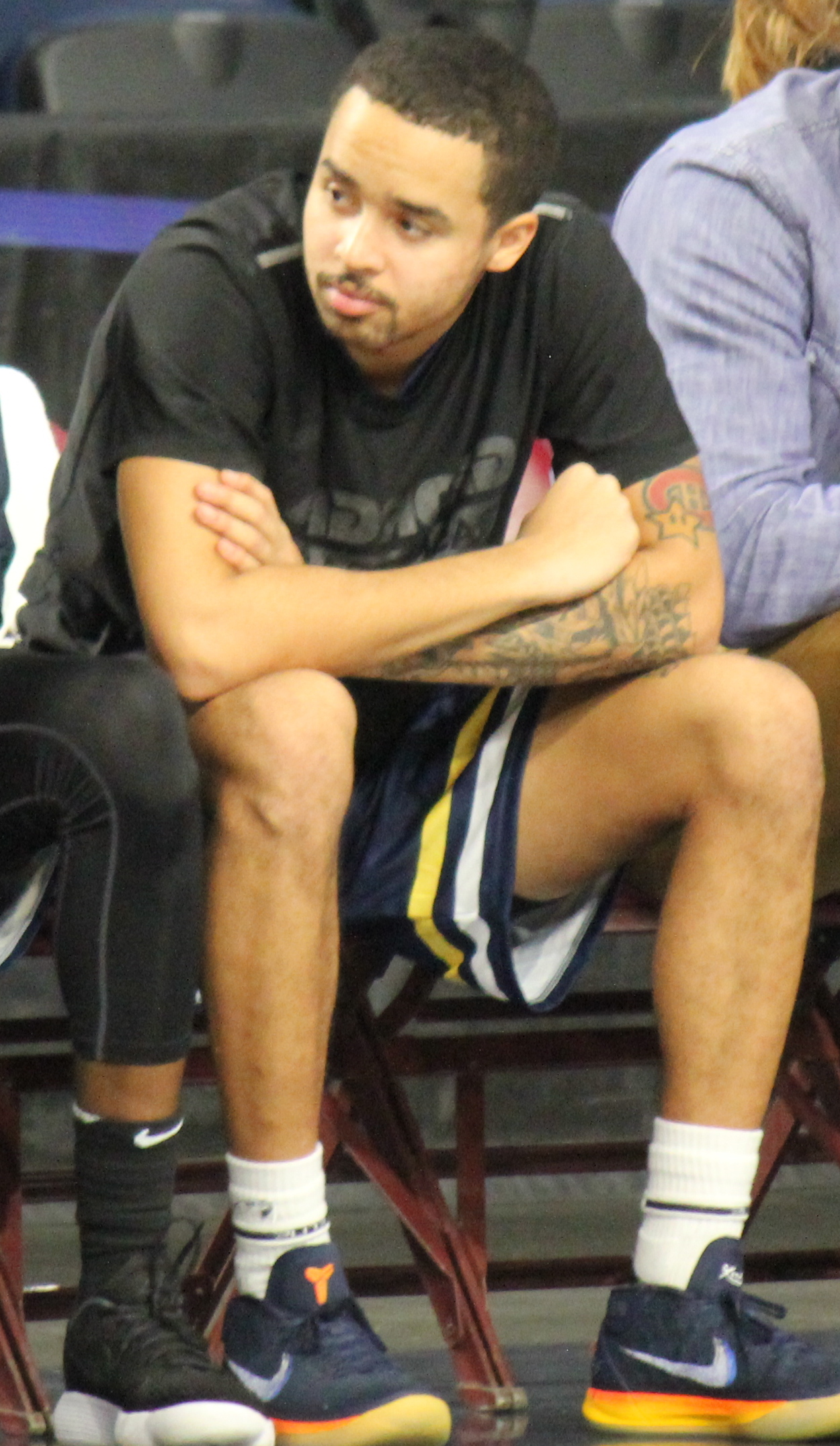
- Skeete in November 2017

No. 10 – Sudbury Five
- Position: Point guard / shooting guard
- League: NBL Canada

Personal information
- Born: April 16, 1993 (age 33)
- Listed height: 6 ft 3 in (1.91 m)
- Listed weight: 175 lb (79 kg)

Career information
- High school: Cardinal Leger (Brampton, Ontario); Wasatch Academy (Mount Pleasant, Utah); Bridgton Academy (Bridgton, Maine)
- College: Buffalo (2012–2016)
- NBA draft: 2016: undrafted
- Playing career: 2016–present

Career history
- 2016–2017: Cape Breton Highlanders
- 2017–2019: St. John's Edge
- 2020–present: Sudbury Five

Career highlights
- MAC All-Freshman Team (2013)

Jarryn Nathaniel Skeete (born April 16, 1993) is a Canadian professional basketball player for the Sudbury Five of the National Basketball League of Canada. He played college basketball for Buffalo.

== College career ==
Over his four-year Buffalo career, Skeete played for three different head coaches. As a freshman, Skeete was named to the Mid-American Conference (MAC) All-Freshman Team. He had 18 points in a game against Akron that broke the Zips' 18-game winning streak. As a sophomore, Skeete moved to shooting guard to allow Shannon Evans to play point. Buffalo went 23-10 in his junior season and reached the NCAA Tournament before bowing out to West Virginia, a game in which Skeete finished scoreless. He averaged 9.1 points per game on the year. He helped persuade the school to hire Nate Oats as coach after Bobby Hurley left the program. Skeete averaged 7.9 points, 3.2 rebounds and 2.2 assists per game as a senior. Skeete graduated with a degree in communications.

== Professional career ==
Skeete signed with the Cape Breton Highlanders, an expansion franchise in NBL Canada, in November 2016. The following season, Skeete signed with the St. John's Edge. Edge fans would frequently cheer "Skeete" at games due to its regional slang.

In 2020, Skeete joined the Sudbury Five. He averaged 9.7 points, 3.2 rebounds, and 2.0 assists per game, earning Second Team All-Canadian honors.
