= The Basketball Tournament 2022 =

Single elimination basketball tournament

The Basketball Tournament
- 2022

Tournament information
- Location: Regional sites: Albuquerque, New Mexico; Charleston, West Virginia; Cincinnati, Ohio; Dayton, Ohio; New York, New York; Omaha, Nebraska; Syracuse, New York; Wichita, Kansas; Quarterfinal sites: Dayton, Ohio; Wichita, Kansas; Championship site: Dayton, Ohio
- Dates: July 16–August 2, 2022
- Tournament format: Single elimination
- Participants: 64 teams
- Purse: Championship: US$1,000,000 winner-take-all

Final positions
- Champions: Blue Collar U
- Runner-up: Americana for Austism

Tournament statistics
- MVP: C. J. Massinburg
- Top scorer: C. J. Massinburg (94 pts)
- Games played: 63

The Basketball Tournament 2022 was the ninth edition of The Basketball Tournament (TBT), a 5-on-5, single elimination basketball tournament with a $1 million winner-take-all prize. The tournament, involving 64 teams, began on July 16 and ended on August 2 with the championship game in Dayton, Ohio. The tournament format was similar to that of the last pre-COVID-19 edition in 2019—64 teams, each playing in one of eight regionals.

For the first time, the event had a "championship week", starting with the regional winners advancing to quarterfinals at one of two sites, Dayton and Wichita, Kansas. The quarterfinal winners then traveled to (or remained in) Dayton for the semifinals and championship game. Blue Collar U, a team primarily rostered with alumni of the Buffalo Bulls men's basketball program, won the tournament.

== Format ==
For its 2022 edition, TBT retained its traditional 64-team format, and returned to an eight-region format, with each regional involving eight teams at a single host site (similar in format to the NCAA Division II men's and women's tournaments). Seven of the eight regional sites, plus the championship week venues, were revealed by TBT organizers on December 8, 2021. The eighth regional site was revealed on May 19, 2022, as Rucker Park, an iconic outdoor venue in the New York City neighborhood of Harlem. It became TBT's first-ever outdoor venue.

In a feature it calls "Run It Back", TBT organizers invited all teams that won first-round games in the 2021 edition to play in 2022. All but one of these teams accepted their bids before the organizers' initial deadline (the other one missed the deadline, but later accepted). These 31 teams, plus The Enchantment, a team consisting mostly of New Mexico alumni, were announced as the first 32 teams on January 26, 2022. The Enchantment was accepted based on New Mexico's home arena of The Pit being a regional site. The remaining teams, and the regional placements for all entrants, were revealed in a selection special hosted by Chris Vosters with analysts Seth Greenberg and April Gray that aired on TBT's YouTube channel on June 22, 2022.

As with previous years, all tournament games operate with the "Elam Ending", a format of ending the game without use of a game clock. Under the Elam Ending, the clock is turned off at the first dead-ball whistle with 4 minutes or less to play in the game. At that time, a target score, equal to the score of the leading team (or tied teams) plus eight, is set, and the first team to reach this target score is declared the winner of the game. Thus, all games end on a made basket (field goal or free throw) and there is no overtime.

== Venues ==
The Basketball Tournament 2022 featured games in eight locations, each of which hosted a regional. Two served as quarterfinal sites, with one of those also hosting the championship weekend (two semifinal contests and the championship game). Official regional names, if different from the location names, are indicated in the listings below the location names.

Regional sites only Regional and quarterfinal site Regional, quarterfinal, and championship site
Regional sites only Regional and quarterfinal site Regional, quarterfinal, and championship site	Albuquerque (New Mexico)	Charleston (West Virginia)	Cincinnati (Xavier)	Omaha
Regional sites only Regional and quarterfinal site Regional, quarterfinal, and championship site	The Pit	Charleston Coliseum & Convention Center	Cintas Center	D. J. Sokol Arena
Regional sites only Regional and quarterfinal site Regional, quarterfinal, and championship site	Capacity: 15,411	Capacity: 11,519	Capacity: 10,250	Capacity: 2,950
Regional sites only Regional and quarterfinal site Regional, quarterfinal, and championship site	Rucker Park	Syracuse	Wichita	Dayton
Regional sites only Regional and quarterfinal site Regional, quarterfinal, and championship site	Greg Marius Court	SRC Arena	Charles Koch Arena	UD Arena
Regional sites only Regional and quarterfinal site Regional, quarterfinal, and championship site	Capacity: N/A	Capacity: 6,500	Capacity: 10,506	Capacity: 13,435

== Teams ==
TBT has a history of teams rostered primarily with alumni from specific NCAA Division I college basketball programs; 27 such teams entered the 2022 tournament. Five other teams were rostered primarily with alumni from groups of NCAA basketball programs sharing a common bond. Two mostly consist of alumni from a specific Division I conference, one is drawn from a group of historic basketball rivals, another is drawn from NCAA Division III alumni, and the last is drawn from historically black colleges and universities.

Name	College or sponsor affiliation	Source of team name	Region
AfterShocks	Wichita State alumni	School nickname of Shockers	Wichita
Air Raiders	Texas Tech alumni	School nickname of Red Raiders	Wichita
Always Us	Oregon alumni	Phrase used by Oregon head coach Dana Altman	Omaha
Americana for Autism (Note: Known in previous TBT editions as Autism Army.)	—	Team sponsor Americana, an NFT company	Rucker Park
Athletics Miami	—	Team sponsor Athletics Miami, a basketball facility	Dayton
B1 Ballers	—		Wichita
Best Virginia	West Virginia alumni		West Virginia
Big 5	Philadelphia Big 5 alumni		Rucker Park
Bleed Green	North Texas alumni	School nickname of Mean Green	Wichita
Blue Collar U	Buffalo alumni	Primary school color, plus city's blue-collar image	Syracuse
Boeheim's Army	Syracuse alumni	Syracuse head coach Jim Boeheim	Syracuse
Brown & White	St. Bonaventure alumni	School colors	Syracuse
Bucketneers	ETSU alumni	School nickname of Buccaneers	West Virginia
Cititeam	—		Dayton
Competitive Choice	—		New Mexico
The Cru	Valparaiso alumni	Former school nickname of Crusaders	Omaha
DaGuys STL	—	Team YouTube channel, with players mainly from Greater St. Louis	Omaha
Defeat Diabetes	JDRF		Xavier
Eberlein Drive	—	Team owners' home street	Wichita
The Enchantment	New Mexico alumni	State nickname, "Land of Enchantment"	New Mexico
Ex-Pats	Patriot League alumni		Rucker Park
Florida TNT	—	Players with connections to the state of Florida	Xavier
Fort Wayne Champs	—	Players with connections to Fort Wayne, Indiana	Xavier
Founding Fathers	James Madison alumni	Status of school namesake James Madison as one of the Founding Fathers	West Virginia
Friday Beers (Note: Known in previous TBT editions as Armored Athlete.)	Armored Athlete		Syracuse
Fully Loaded	Alumni of AAU program Team Loaded		West Virginia
Golden Eagles	Marquette alumni	School nickname of Golden Eagles	Dayton
Gutter Cat Gang (Note: Known in previous TBT editions as Team Hines.)	—	Team sponsor Gutter Cat Gang, an NFT company	Omaha
HBCUnited	HBCU alumni		Rucker Park
Heartfire	MedImpact		New Mexico
Herd That	Marshall alumni	School nickname of Thundering Herd	West Virginia
Hoopville Warriors	—	Players with connections to Chicago	Rucker Park
India Rising	—	Players of Indian origin	Syracuse
Jackson Underdawgs	—	Players with connections to Jackson, Tennessee	Omaha
LA Cheaters	Drew League		New Mexico
Lone Star Legends	—	Players with connections to the state of Texas, nicknamed "Lone Star State"	Wichita
Men of Mackey	Purdue alumni	Purdue home court Mackey Arena	Dayton
Mental Toughness	JCK Foundation		Syracuse
Mid American Unity	Mid-American Conference alumni		Dayton
The Money Team	TMT	Team sponsor Floyd "Money" Mayweather	Dayton
Nasty Nati	Cincinnati alumni	Nickname of the city of Cincinnati	Xavier
The Nerd Team	—	Players from "more prestigious" universities	Syracuse
NG Saints	Neumann Goretti High School	Abbreviation and nickname of school	Syracuse
Ohio 1804	Ohio alumni	Year of school's founding	Dayton
Omaha Blue Crew	Creighton alumni	Location and primary color of school	Omaha
Once a Bronco	Boise State alumni	School nickname of Broncos	New Mexico
Panamaniacs	New Mexico State alumni	NMSU home court Pan American Center	New Mexico
Peacock Nation	Saint Peter's alumni	School nickname of Peacocks	Rucker Park
Purple & Black	Kansas State alumni	School colors	Wichita
Ram Up	Colorado State alumni	School nickname of Rams	New Mexico
Red Scare	Dayton alumni	Name of Dayton student section	Dayton
Sideline Cancer	—	Pancreatic cancer awareness	Xavier
Skip to My Lou	—	Streetball moniker of team head coach Rafer Alston	Rucker Park
Sweet Home Alabama	—	Classic Lynyrd Skynyrd song, reflecting the Alabama origins of team players	Xavier
Team AboutBillions	—	Brand of team sponsor Adrien Broner	Xavier
Team Arkansas	Arkansas alumni		Omaha
Team Challenge ALS	—		New Mexico
Team Overtime	Overtime Elite	Team sponsor Overtime Elite, a sports media company and league	Omaha
Virginia Dream	—	Players with connections to the state of Virginia	West Virginia
War Ready	Auburn alumni	School battle cry "War Eagle"	West Virginia
We Are D3	NCAA Division III alumni		Wichita
WoCo Showtime	Wofford alumni	Wofford College	West Virginia
YGC	Marcus Smart		Rucker Park
Zip Em Up	Xavier alumni	Former Xavier team motto	Xavier

Note: team names are per the TBT bracket; some names have slight variation on TBT website pages.

== Tournament bracket ==
All eight no. 1 seeds advanced in first-round play; the lowest seed to advance to the second round was no. 7 Bleed Green in the Wichita Regional.

Six no. 1 seeds advanced in second-round play; the lowest seed to advance to the third round was again Bleed Green.

Five no. 1 seeds advanced in third-round play; the lowest seed to advance to the quarterfinals was no 3. Red Scare from the Dayton Regional.

Only a single no. 1 seed, AfterShocks from the Wichita Regional, won a quarterfinal match; the lowest seed to advance to the semifinals was again Red Scare.

In the first semifinal game, AfterShocks were eliminated by Americana for Autism, the no. 2 seed from the Rucker Park Regional.

In the second semifinal game, Red Scare were eliminated by Blue Collar U, the no. 2 seed from the Syracuse Regional.

Blue Collar U then defeated Americana for Autism in the championship game.

=== Rucker Park Regional – Greg Marius Court (New York City) ===
First Round; July 16
1	YGC	79
8	Hoopville Warriors	74
4	HBCUnited	76
5	Skip To My Lou	72
3	Ex-Pats	67
6	Big 5	74
2	Americana for Autism	69
7	Peacock Nation	68

Second Round; July 17
1	YGC	59
4	HBCUnited	66
6	Big 5	67
2	Americana for Autism	83

Third Round; July 20
4	HBCUnited	63
2	Americana for Autism	67

=== Xavier Regional – Cintas Center (Cincinnati) ===
First Round; July 18
1	Florida TNT	114
8	Team AboutBillions	57
4	Nasty Nati	67
5	Fort Wayne Champs	71
3	Zip Em Up	94
6	Sweet Home Alabama	61
2	Sideline Cancer	78
7	Defeat Diabetes	77

Second Round; July 20
1	Florida TNT	87
5	Fort Wayne Champs	78
3	Zip Em Up	89
2	Sideline Cancer	81

Third Round; July 21
1	Florida TNT	76
3	Zip Em Up	72

=== New Mexico Regional – The Pit (Albuquerque) ===
First Round; July 18
1	Heartfire	84
8	Competitive Choice	75
4	The Enchantment	89
5	Panamaniacs	82
3	LA Cheaters	73
6	Ram Up	68
2	Team Challenge ALS	87
7	Once A Bronco	71

Second Round; July 19
1	Heartfire	79
4	The Enchantment	74
3	LA Cheaters	80
2	Team Challenge ALS	74

Third Round; July 21
1	Heartfire	86
3	LA Cheaters	72

=== Syracuse Regional – SRC Arena ===
First Round; July 22
1	Boeheim's Army	90
8	India Rising	62
4	The Nerd Team	79
5	Brown & White	71
3	Friday Beers	82
6	Mental Toughness	69
2	Blue Collar U	91
7	NG Saints	64

Second Round; July 23
1	Boeheim's Army	74
4	The Nerd Team	81
3	Friday Beers	75
2	Blue Collar U	78

Third Round; July 25
4	The Nerd Team	62
2	Blue Collar U	83

=== Wichita Regional – Charles Koch Arena ===
First Round; July 22
1	AfterShocks	83
8	We are D3	52
4	Air Raiders	90
5	B1 Ballers	89
3	Purple & Black	75
6	Lone Star Legends	73
2	Eberlein Drive	78
7	Bleed Green	79

Second Round; July 23
1	AfterShocks	70
4	Air Raiders	60
3	Purple & Black	62
7	Bleed Green	87

Third Round; July 25
1	AfterShocks	70
7	Bleed Green	69

=== Omaha Regional – D. J. Sokol Arena ===
First Round; July 16
1	Gutter Cat Gang	88
8	The Cru	78
4	Always Us	79
5	Jackson Underdawgs	78
3	Omaha Blue Crew	74
6	Team Overtime	70
2	Team Arkansas	72
7	DaGuys STL	69

Second Round; July 17
1	Gutter Cat Gang	72
4	Always Us	62
3	Omaha Blue Crew	63
2	Team Arkansas	69

Third Round; July 19
1	Gutter Cat Gang	62
2	Team Arkansas	52

=== Dayton Regional – UD Arena ===
First Round; July 24
1	The Money Team	71
8	Athletics Miami	67
4	Men of Mackey	76
5	Mid American Unity	58
3	Red Scare	75
6	Cititeam	70
2	Golden Eagles	77
7	Ohio 1804	72

Second Round; July 26
1	The Money Team	92
4	Men of Mackey	75
3	Red Scare	62
2	Golden Eagles	56

Third Round; July 27
1	The Money Team	81
3	Red Scare	83

=== West Virginia Regional – Charleston Coliseum & Convention Center ===
First Round; July 24
1	Best Virginia	75
8	Virginia Dream	45
4	Herd That	77
5	Founding Fathers	71
3	WoCo Showtime	67
6	War Ready	70
2	Bucketneers	83
7	Fully Loaded	73

Second Round; July 26
1	Best Virginia	89
4	Herd That	79
6	War Ready	80
2	Bucketneers	83

Third Round; July 27
1	Best Virginia	63
2	Bucketneers	62

=== Championship Week – Dayton & Wichita ===
All games played at Dayton, except for one quarterfinal (Wichita winner vs. Omaha winner) played at Wichita.

Quarterfinals; July 27–29
DA 3	Red Scare	67
WV 1	Best Virginia	60
SY 2	Blue Collar U	74
NM 1	Heartfire	66
WT 1	AfterShocks	74
OM 1	Gutter Cat Gang	67
XA 1	Florida TNT	83
RP 2	Americana for Autism	93

Semifinals; July 30
DA 3	Red Scare	69
SY 2	Blue Collar U	74
WT 1	AfterShocks	75
RP 2	Americana for Autism	78

Championship; August 2
SY 2	Blue Collar U	89
RP 2	Americana for Autism	67

Announcers for both semifinal matches and the championship game were Bob Rathbun, Fran Fraschilla, and Angel Gray.

==== Semifinals ====
ESPN

July 30, 2022
4:00 p.m. EDT

Stats, Recap

WT 1 AfterShocks 75, RP 2 Americana for Autism 78
Scoring by quarter: 18–22, 18–21, 23–20, 16–15
Pts: C. Frankamp 15; Rebs: J. Dickey 8 Asts: R. Kelly 4	Pts: I. Swann 18; Rebs: D. James 6 Asts: D. Monroe 6

UD Arena
Dayton, Ohio
Referees: E. Walton, T. Morrisey, D. George

ESPN

July 30, 2022
6:00 p.m. EDT

Stats, Recap

DA 3 Red Scare 69, SY 2 Blue Collar U 74
Scoring by quarter: 15–19, 20–14, 14–22, 20–19
Pts: S. Smith 22; Rebs: J. Cunningham 8 Asts: S. Smith 3	Pts: W. Clark 22; Rebs: N. Perkins 11; Asts: C. Massinburg 4

UD Arena
Dayton, Ohio
Attendance: 4,412
Referees: C. Armstong, R. Natilli, M. Potter

==== Championship ====
ESPN

August 2, 2022
8:00 p.m. EDT

Stats

SY 2 Blue Collar U 89, RP 2 Americana for Autism 67
Scoring by quarter: 25–13, 20–18, 22–20, 22–16
Pts: N. Perkins 19; Rebs: B. Hamilton & C. Massinburg 8 Asts: C. Massinburg 8	Pts: N. Johnson 20; Rebs: C. Wright 5 Asts: D. Monroe 6

UD Arena
Dayton, Ohio
Attendance: 1,925
Referees: J. Anderson, R. Natilli, E. Walton

The final points of the tournament, securing the championship for Blue Collar U, came on a dunk by Montell McRae.

== Awards ==
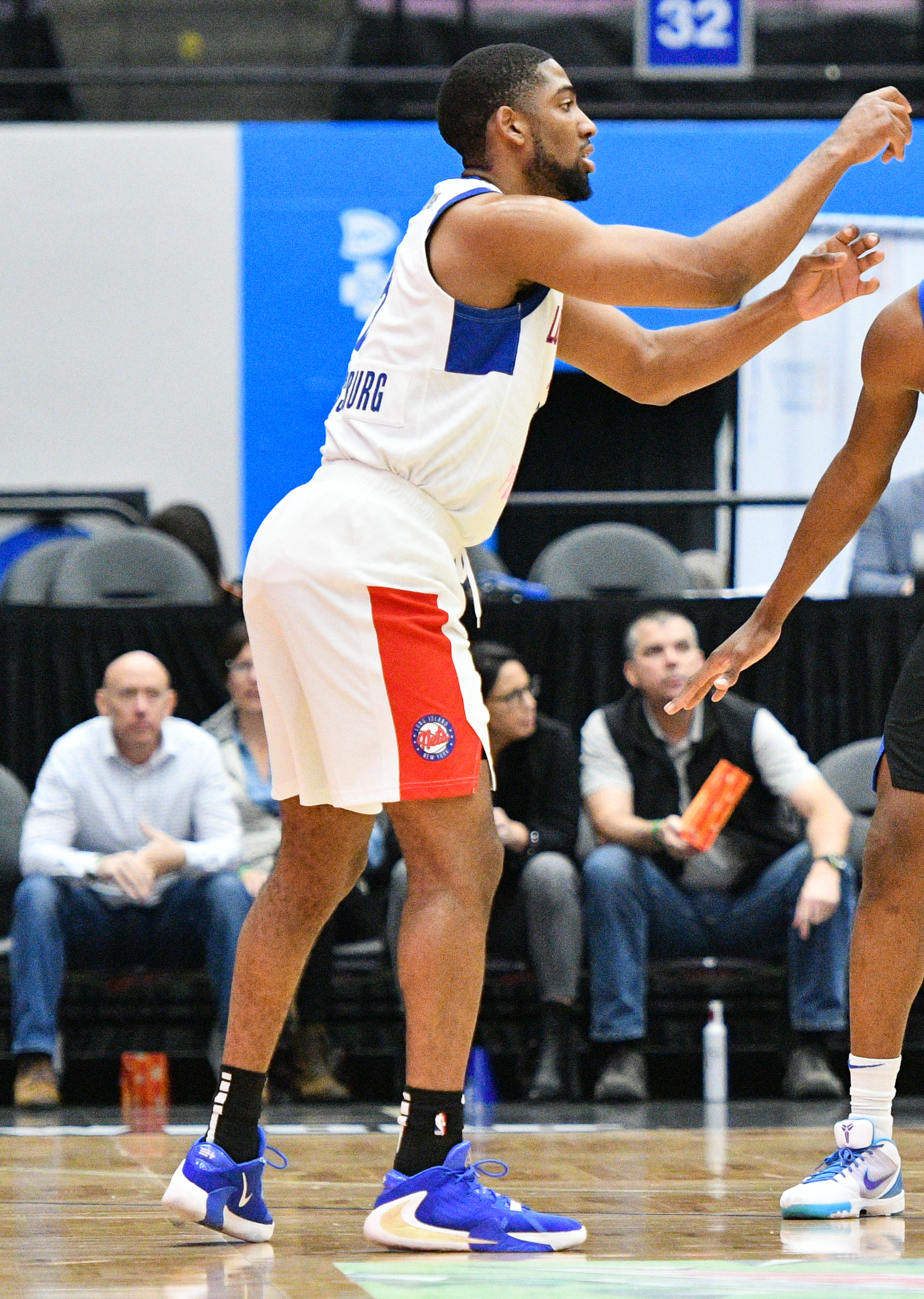
C. J. Massinburg, tournament MVP

All Tournament Team
Pos	Player	Team
PG	Chris Warren	Florida TNT
PG	Scoochie Smith	Red Scare
SG	C. J. Massinburg (MVP)	Blue Collar U
PG	Wes Clark	Blue Collar U
PF	Nick Perkins	Blue Collar U
Coach	Adam Bauman	Blue Collar U
GM	Griffin Taylor	Americana for Autism

== 33-Point Contest ==
The "33-Point Contest", first held in 2021, returned. In the 2022 edition, select individual players competed in each region to see who could make 11 three-point field goals the fastest, with regional winners advancing to a final round in Dayton. (Note: If a regional winner was unavailable for the final round in Dayton, organizers selected a replacement.)

Finalists (team, region):

- Sean Armand (Friday Beers, Syracuse)
- Jordon Crawford (The Money Team, Dayton)
- Eric Demers (We are D3, Wichita)
- Trevor John (Sweet Home Alabama, Xavier)
- James Long (Best Virginia, West Virginia)
- Anthony Mathis (The Enchantment, New Mexico)
- Ryan Taylor (Ohio 1804, Dayton)
- Brandon Wood (The Cru, Omaha)

The contest and prize of $33,333.33 was won by Ryan Taylor. (Note: Two players named Ryan Taylor have played in TBT: forward Ryan Taylor who attended Marshall, and guard Ryan Taylor who attended Ohio, Evansville, and Northwestern. The latter Ryan Taylor was the winner of the 33-Point Contest.)
