= Wes Clark =

Wes Clark may refer to:

- Wes Clark (basketball), American basketball player
- Wesley Clark, American army general, retired
- Wesley A. Clark, computer scientist
