= Robert C. Lacey =

American businessman and politician

Robert C. Lacey (October 10, 1886 – December 17, 1943) was an American businessman and politician from New York.

== Life ==
Lacey was born on October 10, 1886, in Buffalo, New York.

Lacey graduated from St. Bridget's parochial school. He was engaged in the milk business at an early age, and he later established his own coal and ice company. For a number of years, he managed several amateur baseball clubs in Buffalo and western New York and gained a positive reputation as a baseball pitcher for his own teams. He was involved with the labor movement since around 1906, when he joined the Ore Men's Organization. He climbed rapidly through labor union circles, becoming chairman of arbitration, first vice-president, and president of the Buffalo Central Labor Council. He was also a member of the Bartenders', Engineers, and Oilers' Union. A founder and president of the United Irish & American Association, he was considered the father of the Buffalo St. Patrick's Day Parade.

In 1922, Lacey was elected to the New York State Senate as a Democrat, representing New York's 49th State Senate district. He served in the Senate in 1923 and 1924. He introduced several bills that affected labor conditions. When the Senate was deadlocked on important votes, he would often serve as the deciding 51st vote. He sponsored legislation that was locally controversial, including pay raises for firemen and police and requiring a two-thirds City Council vote to override mayoral vetoes. After unsuccessfully running for the city council, he operated a chemical business. He later established a restaurant and saloon.

Lacey was president of the Wildon Club. He was a member of the Fraternal Order of Eagles, the Orioles, the Woodmen of the World, and the Elks. He was married to Harriet Noack. They had a son, John.

Lacey died at home on December 17, 1943. He was buried in Holy Cross Cemetery in Lackawanna.

New York State Senate
| Preceded by William E. Martin | New York State Senate; 49th District; 1923–1924 | Succeeded by Leonard R. Lipowicz |
