= William E. Martin (New York politician) =

American politician

William E. Martin (January 31, 1886 – September 20, 1923) was an American politician from New York.

== Life ==
Martin was born on January 31, 1886, in Buffalo, New York. He worked as a shipbuilder.

Martin began his political career as a district committeeman in the first ward. In 1920, he was elected to the New York State Senate as a Republican, representing New York's 49th State Senate district. He served in the State Senate in 1921 and 1922. In January 1923, he was appointed deputy park commissioner, in charge of South Park.

Martin was married to Cora Richard. Their children were Elizabeth, Loretta, Mildred, and Robert. He was a member of the Knights of Columbus and the Elks.

Martin died at home from a heart attack on September 20, 1923. He was buried in Holy Cross Cemetery.

New York State Senate
Preceded by Samuel J. Ramsperger	New York State Senate; 49th District; 1921-1922	Succeeded by Robert C. Lacey
