= Buffalo Bulls men's basketball =

Men's college basketball team

2025–26 Buffalo Bulls men's basketball team
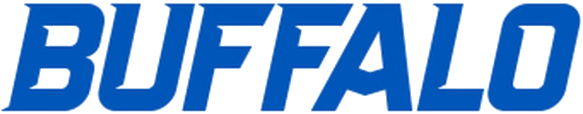
- University: University at Buffalo
- Head coach: George Halcovage (2nd season)
- Location: Buffalo, New York
- Arena: Broadview Arena (capacity: 6,783)
- Conference: Mid-American
- Nickname: Bulls
- Colors: Royal blue and white
- All-time record: 1,284–1,195 (.518)

NCAA Division I tournament Elite Eight
- 1957*
Other NCAA Division I tournament results
Sweet Sixteen	1957*, 1965*
Appearances	1957*, 1958*, 1959*, 1960*, 1963*, 1965*, 1982**, 2015, 2016, 2018, 2019

Conference tournament champions
- 1982**, 2015, 2016, 2018, 2019

Conference regular-season champions
- 2009, 2015, 2018, 2019

Conference division champions
- 2009, 2014, 2015, 2018, 2019, 2021

Uniforms
Home	Away	Alternate
- * at Division II level ** at Division III level

The Buffalo Bulls men's basketball team represents the University at Buffalo in Buffalo, New York, United States. The team currently competes in the National Collegiate Athletic Association (NCAA) at the Division I level as a member of the Mid-American Conference (MAC) East Division. Buffalo began play in 1915 and joined the MAC in 1998. They won their first MAC East Division title in 2009, and won a third MAC East Division title in 2015 along with their first outright MAC Regular-Season championship and first MAC Tournament title to earn the program's first bid to the NCAA Division I men's basketball tournament. The Bulls also have six appearances in the NCAA College Division Basketball Championship between 1957 and 1965 and two appearances in the National Invitation Tournament (NIT). Their head coach position was filled on March 30, 2023 when Buffalo hired Villanova associate head coach George Halcovage.

== History ==
Men's basketball teams representing the University at Buffalo date back to at least December 1, 1905 when the Buffalo Bisons played in front of a crowd of 400 in Buffalo, losing 27–23 to Cornell University. Their first known win came in their following game against Tonawanda High School in the high school's gym. Their first known win against a fellow college basketball team came in the first game of the following season against Cornell at a roller rink.

In 1915, an official basketball program was launched with the full support of the university amid an athletic revival that saw the rebirth of the football team in the same year. Art Powell of the University of Rochester was hired as head coach for the inaugural season. The team practiced at a Turn-Verein building and played its home games at a Fraternal Order Orioles hall.

Although the university did not officially change its athletics teams' names from Bisons to Bulls until 1931, the basketball team was referred to as the Bulls in newspaper coverage as early as 1926.

No.	Tenure	Coach	Years	Record	Pct.
1	1991–1993	Dan Bazzani	2	7–48	.127
2	1993–2000	Tim Cohane	7	80–93	.462
3	2000–2013	Reggie Witherspoon	14	198–228	.465
4	2013–2015	Bobby Hurley	2	42–20	.677
5	2015–2019	Nate Oats^	4	96–43	.691
6	2019–2023	Jim Whitesell^	4	70–49	.588
7	2023–present	George Halcovage	3	30–64	.319
Totals		7 coaches	57 seasons	713–705	.503
Records updated through end of 2025–26 season Source; *Alum^Promoted from assistant to head coach

== Conference affiliations ==
- 1915–16 to 1942–43 – Independent
- 1943–44 to 1944–45 – Did not play
- 1945–46 to 1977–78 – Independent
- 1978–79 to 1987–88 – State University of New York Athletic Conference (SUNYAC)
- 1988–89 to 1990–91 – Mideast Conference
- 1991–92 – East Coast Conference
- 1992–93 – Independent
- 1993–94 – East Coast Conference
- 1994–95 to 1997–98 – Mid-Continent Conference (Mid-Con)
- 1998–99 to present – Mid-American Conference

== Postseason ==
=== NCAA Division I tournament ===
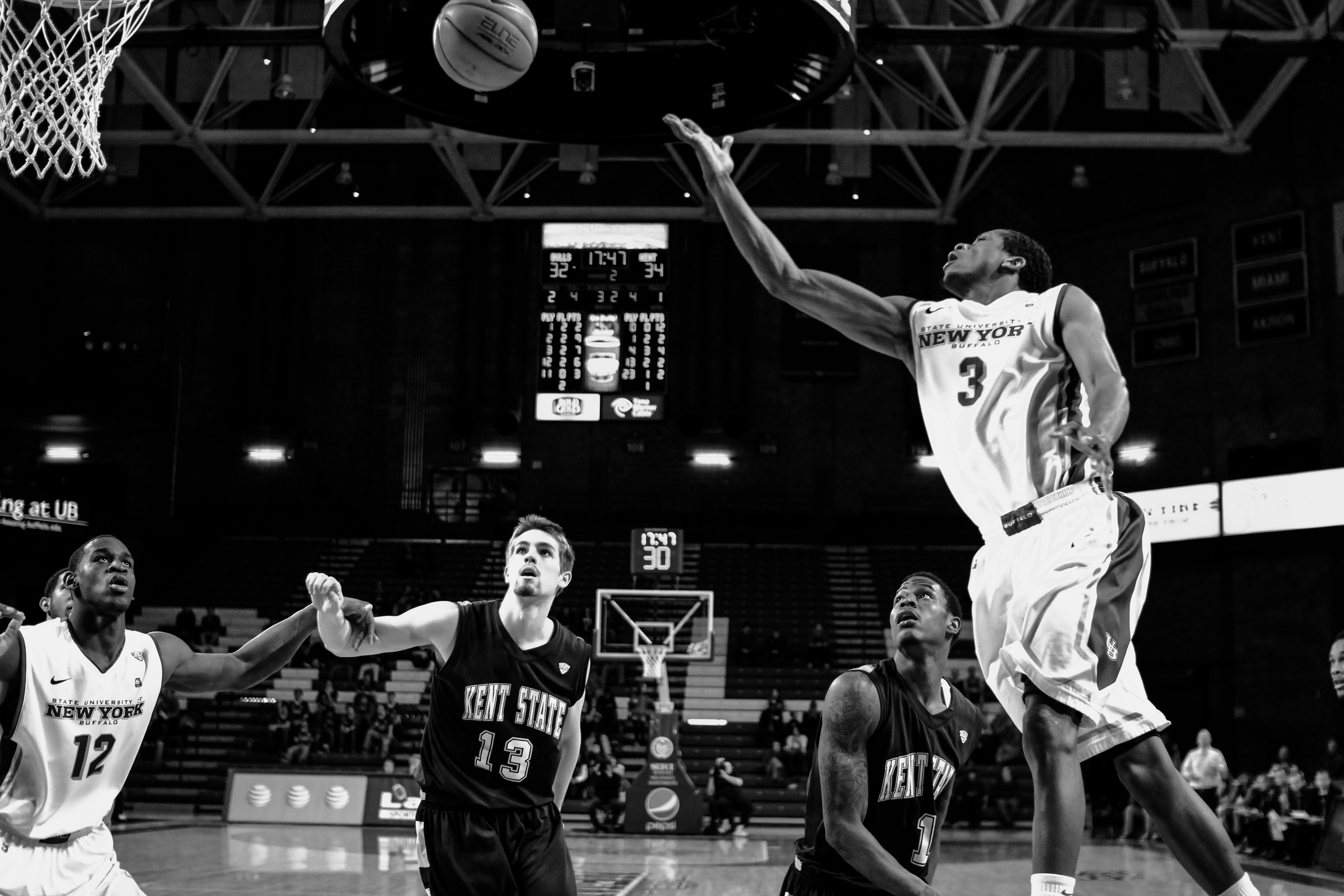
Bulls vs. Kent State in 2014

The Bulls have appeared in the NCAA Division I tournament four times. Their combined record is 2–4.

Year	Seed	Round	Opponent	Result
2015	#12	First round	#5 West Virginia	L 62–68
2016	#14	First round	#3 Miami	L 72–79
2018	#13	First round Second Round	#4 Arizona #5 Kentucky	W 89–68; L 75–95
2019	#6	First round Second Round	#11 Arizona State #3 Texas Tech	W 91–74; L 58–78

=== NCAA Division II Tournament results ===
The Bulls appeared in the NCAA Division II tournament six times. Their combined record is 6–7.

Year	Round	Opponent	Result
1957	Regional semifinals Regional Finals; Elite Eight	Capital; Evansville; Kentucky Wesleyan	W 75–64; W 77–75; L 68–72
1958	Regional semifinals Regional 3rd-place game	American; Philadelphia Textile	L 60–77; W 77–73
1959	Regional semifinals Regional 3rd-place game	Saint Michael's; Williams	L 51–53; W 78–53
1960	Regional semifinals Regional 3rd-place game	Wabash; Arkansas State	L 65–76; W 53–52
1963	Regional semifinals Regional 3rd-place game	South Carolina State; Youngstown State	L 63–80; L 53–65
1965	Regional semifinals Regional Finals	Randolph-Macon; Akron	W 81–69; L 58–69

=== NCAA Division III Tournament results ===
The Bulls appeared in the NCAA Division III tournament once. They went 0–2.

Year	Round	Opponent	Result
1982	Regional semifinals Regional 3rd-place game	Staten Island; Ithaca	L 53–64; L 73–74

=== NIT results ===
The Bulls have appeared in the National Invitation Tournament (NIT) two times. Their record is 1–2.

Year	Round	Opponent	Result
2005	Opening Round; First round	Drexel; Saint Joseph's	W 81–76^{OT} L 50–55
2021	First round	Colorado State	L 73–75

=== CIT results ===
The Bulls have appeared in the CollegeInsider.com Postseason Tournament (CIT) two times. Their combined record is 3–2.

Year	Round	Opponent	Result
2011	First round Second Round; Quarterfinals	Quinnipiac; Western Michigan; Iona	W 75–68; W 49–48; L 63–78
2012	First round Second Round	American; Oakland	W 78–61; L 76–84

=== CBI results ===
The Bulls have appeared in the College Basketball Invitational (CBI) once. Their record is 0–1.

Year	Round	Opponent	Result
2009	First round	Wichita State	L 73–84

== Broadview Arena ==
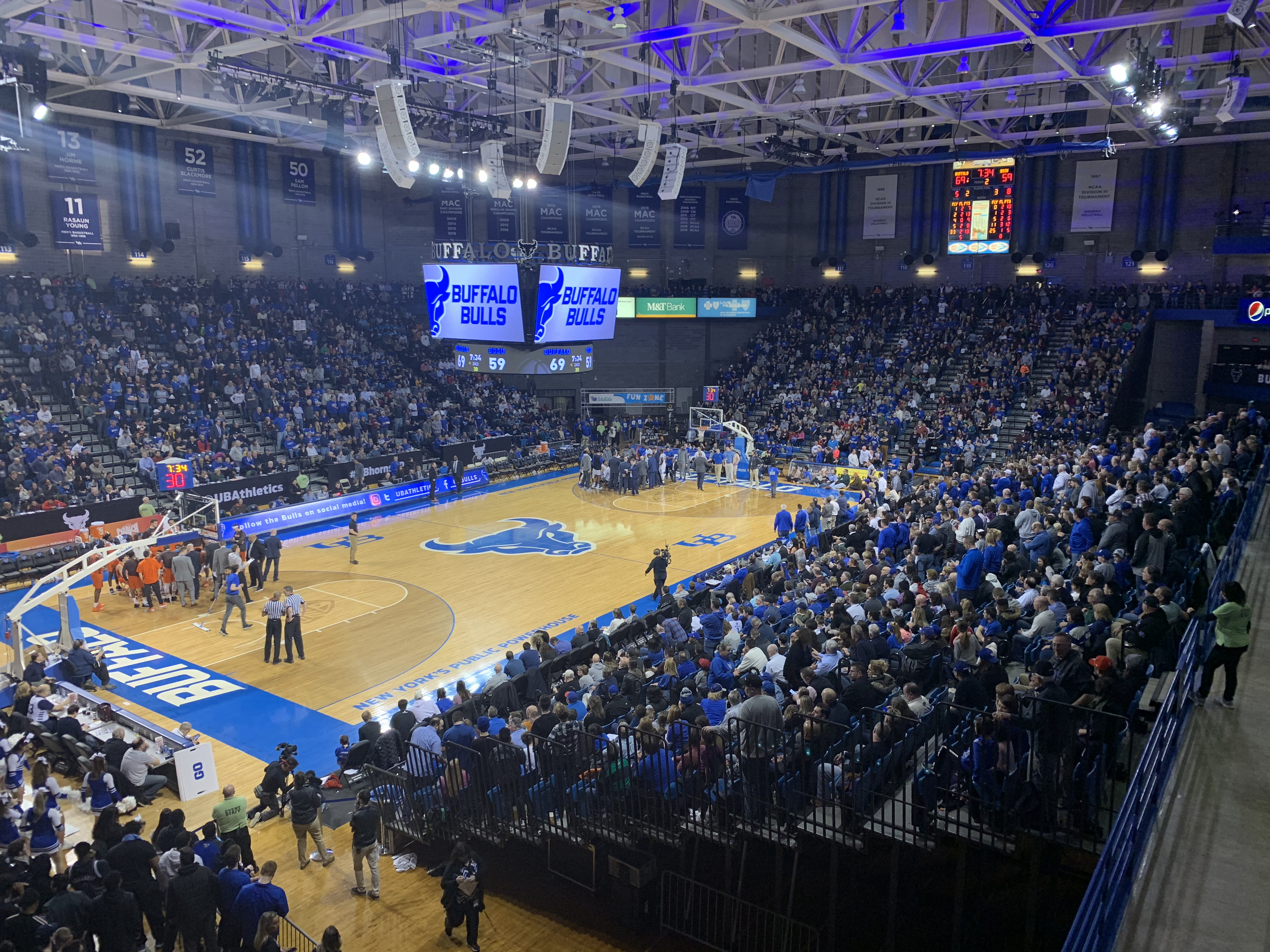
Bulls Basketball complex in Broadview Arena

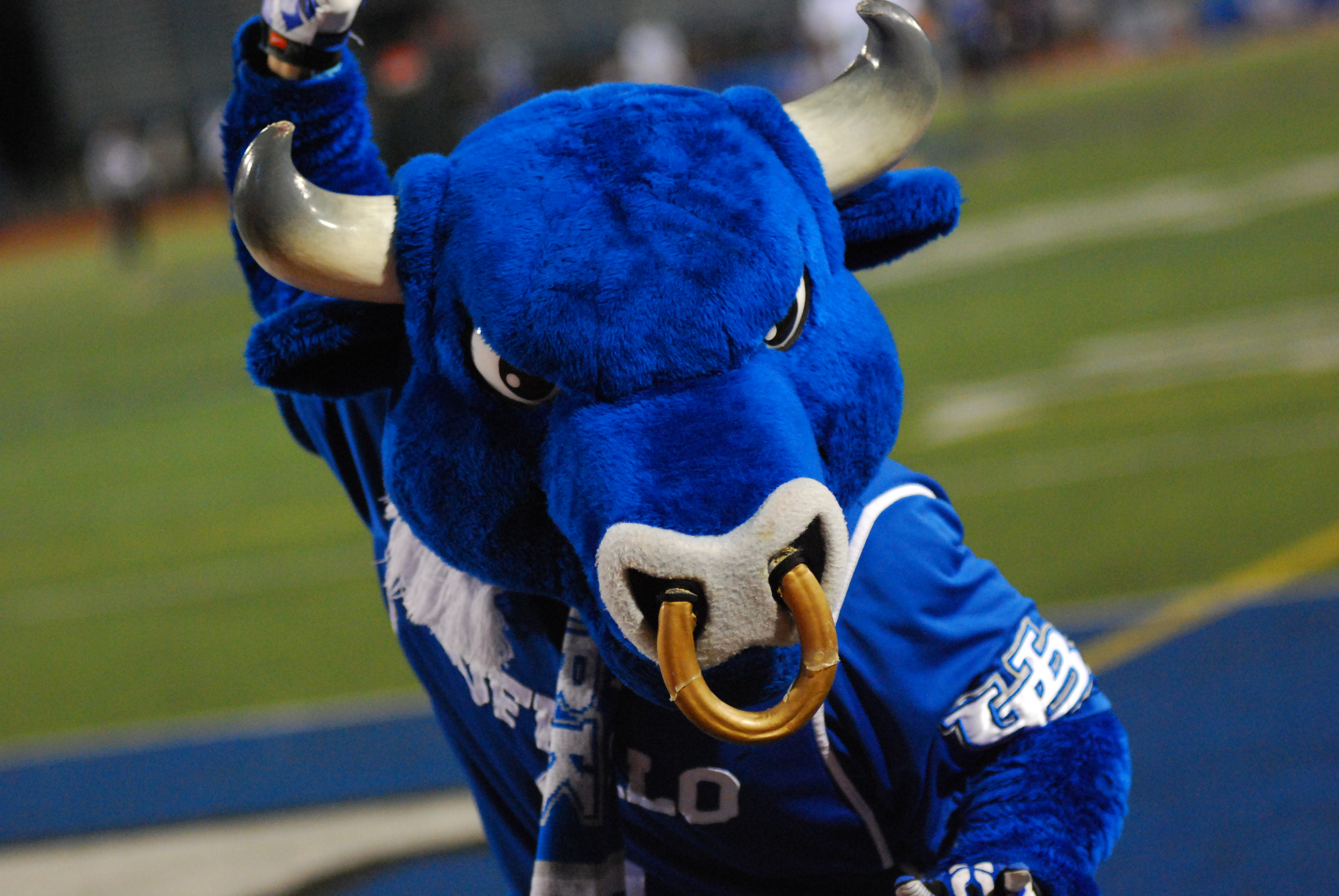
Victor E. Bull, Buffalo Bulls Mascot, November 5, 2013

The Buffalo Bulls play their home games at Broadview Arena, located in Amherst, New York. The arena seats 6,100 spectators and features a state of the art video-board, sound, and lighting systems.

== Notable former players ==
=== NBA players ===
Three former Bulls have played in the National Basketball Association (NBA):

- Sam Pellom: Played for the Atlanta Hawks (1979–82) & Milwaukee Bucks (1982–83)
- Nate Williams: Debuted for the Portland Trail Blazers in 2023
- Curtis Jones: Debuted for the Denver Nuggets in 2025

=== Other notable alumni ===
- Turner Battle, MAC Player of the Year (2005), Bulls assistant coach, athletic director of The Park School of Buffalo
- Wes Clark, The Basketball Tournament (TBT) 2022 champion
- Modie Cox, professional basketball player and coach
- Shannon Evans, professional basketball player
- Blake Hamilton, TBT 2022 champion
- Jeremy Harris, TBT 2022 champion
- Yassin Idbihi, professional player, 3× Bundesliga champion and 2× All-Star
- C. J. Massinburg, MAC Player of the Year, TBT 2022 champion and MVP, Italian Cup champion
- Javon McCrea, MAC Player of the Year (2014), professional basketball player, ABA All-Star
- Justin Moss, MAC Player of the Year (2015), professional basketball player
- Nick Perkins, professional basketball player, 2022 TBT Champion
- Jarryn Skeete, Canadian professional basketball player
- Mitchell Watt, MAC Player of the Year (2012), champion of the FIBA Europe Cup, Italian Cup, German Cup and Balkan League

== Retired numbers ==
Buffalo Bulls retired numbers
No.	Player	Tenure	Ref.
13	Jim Horne	1951–55	
19	Harold Kuhn	1949–52	
50	Sam Pellom	1974–78	
52	Curtis Blackmore	1970–73	

=== Honored jerseys ===
Jerseys were retired but the numbers remain available:

No.	Player	Tenure	Ref.
11	Rasaun Young	1993–98	
11	Turner Battle	2001–05	

== All-Americans ==
The following Buffalo players were named NCAA Men's Basketball All-Americans:

- Sam Pellom – 1976 (AP Honorable Mention)
- Turner Battle – 2005 (AP Honorable Mention)
- Mitchell Watt – 2012 (AP Honorable Mention)
- Javon McCrea – 2014 (AP Honorable Mention)
- Justin Moss – 2015 (AP Honorable Mention)
- C. J. Massinburg – 2019 (AP Honorable Mention)

== Academic All-Americans ==
The following Buffalo players were named Academic All-Americans:

- Turner Battle – 2005

== Mid-American Conference award recipients ==
=== Player of the Year ===
- Turner Battle – 2005
- Mitchell Watt – 2012
- Javon McCrea – 2014
- Justin Moss – 2015
- C. J. Massinburg – 2019

=== Tournament MVP ===
- Xavier Ford – 2015
- Willie Conner – 2016
- Wes Clark – 2018
- Jeremy Harris – 2019

=== Coach of the Year ===
- Reggie Witherspoon – 2004
- Nate Oats – 2018, 2019

=== Defensive Player of the Year ===
- Dontay Caruthers – 2017, 2019
- Davonta Jordan – 2020
- Josh Mballa – 2021

=== Freshman of the Year ===
- Javon McCrea – 2011

=== Sixth Man of the Year ===
- Mark Bortz – 2005
- Nick Perkins – 2017, 2018, 2019
- Ronaldo Segu – 2020

=== Academic All-MAC ===
- Mark Bortz – 2004, 2005
- Turner Battle – 2003, 2004, 2005
- Vadim Fedotov – 2009
- John Boyer – 2010
- Byron Mulkey – 2011
- Tony Watson II – 2012
- Will Regan – 2013, 2014
- Shannon Evans – 2015
- Nikola Rakicevic – 2017
- Dontay Caruthers – 2019
- Brock Bertram – 2020, 2021
- Tra'Von Fagan – 2021
- David Skogman – 2021

=== All-MAC teams ===
==== All-MAC First Team ====
- Turner Battle – 2005
- Rodney Pierce – 2009, 2010
- Mitchell Watt – 2012
- Javon McCrea – 2012, 2013, 2014
- Justin Moss – 2015
- C. J. Massinburg – 2018, 2019
- Nick Perkins – 2018, 2019
- Jayvon Graves – 2020
- Jeenathan Williams – 2022

==== All-MAC Second Team ====
- Turner Battle – 2004
- Calvin Cage – 2006
- Byron Mulkey – 2011
- Shannon Evans – 2015
- Blake Hamilton – 2017
- Jeremy Harris – 2018, 2019
- Jayvon Graves – 2021
- Jeenathan Williams – 2021
- Josh Mballa – 2021, 2022
- Ronaldo Segu – 2022

==== All-MAC Third Team ====
- Lamonte Bearden – 2016
- Blake Hamilton – 2016
- Wes Clark – 2018
- Curtis Jones – 2023
- Ryan Sabol – 2026

==== All-Freshman Team ====
- Yassin Idbihi – 2004
- Javon McCrea – 2011
- Jarryn Skeete – 2013
- Shannon Evans – 2014
- Lamonte Bearden – 2015
- C.J. Massinburg – 2016
- Ben Michaels – 2025

==== All-Defensive Team ====
- Willie Conner – 2016
- Dontay Caruthers – 2017, 2019
- Davonta Jordan – 2018, 2019
- Josh Mballa – 2021, 2022

==== All-Tournament team ====
- Turner Battle & Yassin Idbihi – 2005
- Max Boudreau – 2009
- Mitchell Watt – 2012
- Shannon Evans & Xavier Ford – 2015
- Lamonte Bearden, Willie Conner & C. J. Massinburg – 2016
- Wes Clark & Jeremy Harris – 2018
- Josh Mballa & Jeenathan Williams – 2021

== See also ==
- Blue Collar U, a team of primarily Buffalo Bulls alumni that participates in The Basketball Tournament
