= Leonard R. Lipowicz =

American lawyer and politician

Leonard R. Lipowicz (June 10, 1895 – February 1981) was an American lawyer and politician from New York.

== Life ==
He was born on June 10, 1895, in Buffalo, New York. He attended the parochial schools and Central High School there. Lipowicz graduated from Syracuse University in 1918, was admitted to the bar the same year, and practiced law in Buffalo.

He married Adelina B. (1894–1981), and they had two children: Leonard R. Lipowicz Jr. and Marcella (Lipowicz) Rosinski (1919–2012).

Lipowicz was a member of the New York State Senate (49th D.) from 1925 to 1928, sitting in the 148th, 149th, 150th and 151st New York State Legislature. Afterwards he was appointed by Hamilton Ward, Jr. as a Deputy New York Attorney General.

He died in February 1981; and was buried at the Saint Stanislaus Cemetery in Cheektowaga.

New York State Senate
Preceded by Robert C. Lacey	New York State Senate; 49th District; 1925–1928	Succeeded by Stephen J. Wojtkowiak
