= Josh Mballa =

French basketball player (born 1999)

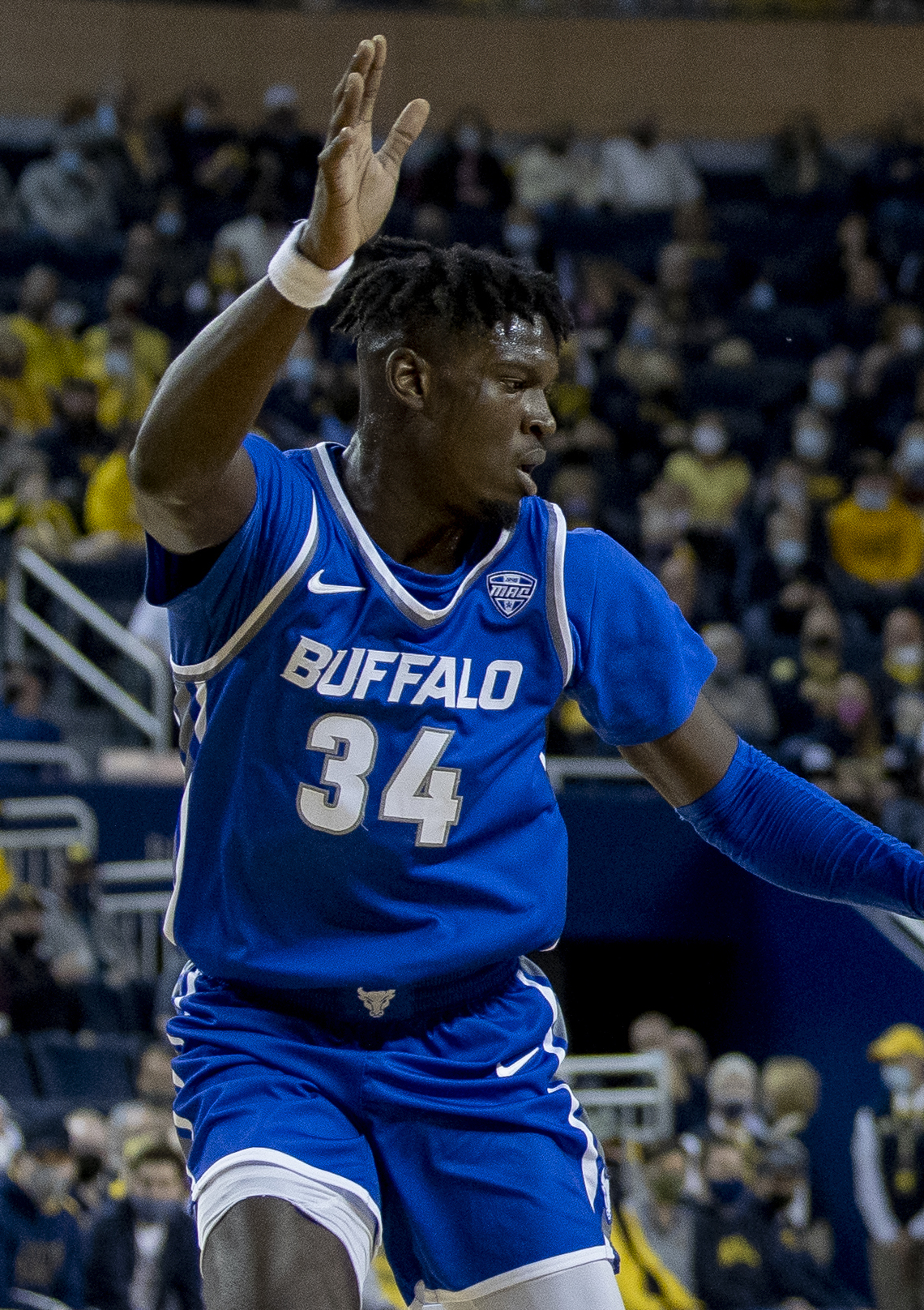
- Mballa with Buffalo in 2021

No. 6 – Élan Béarnais
- Position: Small forward / power forward
- League: LNB Élite

Personal information
- Born: 29 July 1999 (age 27) Detroit, Michigan, U.S.
- Listed height: 6 ft 7 in (2.01 m)
- Listed weight: 220 lb (100 kg)

Career information
- High school: Putnam Science Academy (Putnam, Connecticut)
- College: Texas Tech (2018–2019); Buffalo (2019–2022); Ole Miss (2022–2023)
- NBA draft: 2023: undrafted

Career history
- 2023–2024: Palencia
- 2024–2025: Real Valladolid
- 2025–present: Élan Béarnais

Career highlights
- MAC Defensive Player of the Year (2021); 2× Second-team All-MAC (2021, 2022); 2× MAC All-Defensive Team (2021, 2022)

Joshua Kenneth Mballa (born 29 July 1999) is a French professional basketball player for Élan Béarnais of the LNB Élite. He played college basketball for the Ole Miss Rebels, the Texas Tech Red Raiders and the Buffalo Bulls.

== Early life and career ==
Mballa was born in Detroit, Michigan but raised in Bordeaux, France. He started playing competitive basketball at age eight, learning from Vincent Mbassi, a trainer at Kameet Academy who knew his uncle. He played for Bouscat and then JSA Bordeaux before joining Orléans Loiret. Mballa returned to the United States for high school, attending Putnam Science Academy in Putnam, Connecticut. Playing alongside Kyle Lofton and Osun Osunniyi, he helped his team win the National Prep Championship. A three-star recruit, he committed to playing college basketball for Texas Tech over offers from Seton Hall and South Florida.

== College career ==
As a freshman at Texas Tech, Mballa played sparingly, scoring 13 total points, and his team reached the national championship game. For his sophomore season, he transferred to Buffalo and received a waiver for immediate eligibility. As a sophomore, Mballa averaged 10.8 points and 9.6 rebounds per game. He grabbed 308 rebounds, the most by a Buffalo player in a single season since Sam Pellom in the 1975–76 season. He missed three games early in his junior season due to plantar fasciitis. On 19 December 2020, Mballa posted a career-high 27 points and seven rebounds in a 107–96 overtime loss to Syracuse. As a junior, he averaged 15.3 points and 10.8 rebounds per game, receiving Second Team All-Mid-American Conference (MAC), and Defensive Player of the Year honors. He declared for the 2021 NBA draft before withdrawing and returning to Buffalo. Mballa was named to the Second Team All-MAC as a senior. Following the season, Mballa declared for the 2022 NBA draft while maintaining his college eligibility. He also later entered the transfer portal. On May 15, 2022, Mballa announced he was transferring to Ole Miss. He subsequently withdrew from the NBA Draft.

== National team career ==
Mballa represented France at the 2016 FIBA Under-17 World Championship in Spain, where he averaged 4.2 points and four rebounds per game. At the 2017 FIBA U18 European Championship in Slovakia, he averaged 7.4 points and 4.9 rebounds per game.

== Career statistics ==
Legend
GP	Games played	GS	Games started	MPG	Minutes per game
FG%	Field goal percentage	3P%	3-point field goal percentage	FT%	Free throw percentage
RPG	Rebounds per game	APG	Assists per game	SPG	Steals per game
BPG	Blocks per game	PPG	Points per game	**Bold**	Career high

=== College ===
Year	Team	GP	GS	MPG	FG%	3P%	FT%	RPG	APG	SPG	BPG	PPG
2018–19	Texas Tech	17	0	3.4	.444	.000	.357	.3	.1	.1	.1	.8
2019–20	Buffalo	**32**	**20**	25.8	**.562**	.000	.590	9.6	1.0	1.3	**1.1**	10.8
2020–21	Buffalo	22	19	**29.5**	.486	**.250**	**.679**	**10.8**	**1.9**	**1.5**	.5	**15.3**
Career		71	39	21.6	.521	.227	.618	7.7	1.0	1.1	.7	9.8
