= Nick Perkins =

American basketball player (born 1996)

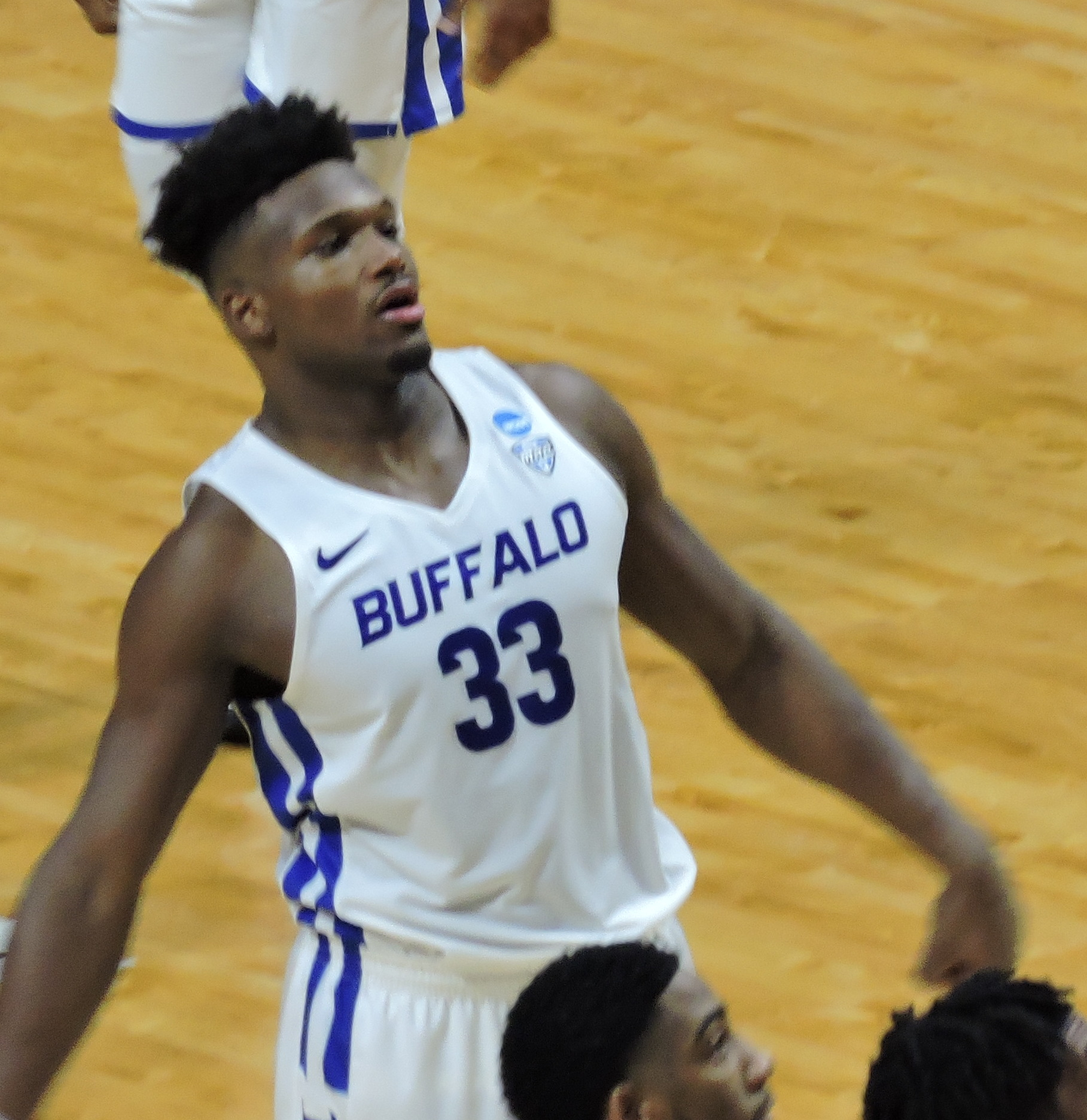

No. 33 – Sabah BC
- Position: Power forward / center
- League: Azerbaijan Basketball League; Champions League

Personal information
- Born: October 15, 1996 (age 29) Saginaw, Michigan, U.S.
- Listed height: 2.03 m (6 ft 8 in)
- Listed weight: 115 kg (254 lb)

Career information
- High school: Milan (Milan, Michigan)
- College: Buffalo (2015–2019)
- NBA draft: 2019: undrafted
- Playing career: 2019–present

Career history
- 2019–2020: Niigata Albirex BB
- 2020–2023: New Basket Brindisi
- 2023–2024: Nagasaki Velca
- 2024: Indios de Mayagüez
- 2024–2025: TSG GhostHawks
- 2025: Indios de Mayagüez
- 2025: Al-Ahli Jeddah
- 2025–2026: Daegu KOGAS Pegasus
- 2026: Atléticos de San Germán
- 2026–present: Sabah BC

Career highlights
- 2× First-team All-MAC (2018, 2019); 3× MAC Sixth Man of the Year (2017–2019)

Nicholas Brandon Perkins (born October 15, 1996) is an American basketball player for Sabah BC of the Azerbaijan Basketball League. He played college basketball for the Buffalo Bulls.

== High school career ==
Perkins was born in Saginaw, Michigan and raised in Ypsilanti. He played four years of high school basketball for Milan High School. He led the Big Reds to a Class B State title in 2014, and nearly won a state title the following year. As a junior, Perkins averaged 15 points, 9.3 rebounds and 2.4 blocks per game. As a senior in September 2014, Perkins committed to play basketball at the University at Buffalo, choosing the Bulls over offers from Toledo, Kent State, Northern Illinois, Akron, Cleveland State and Detroit Mercy.

== College career ==
As a freshman at Buffalo, Perkins averaged 7.6 points per game and 4.3 rebounds per game. He averaged a little better his sophomore season as he put up 12.4 points per game and 6.7 rebounds, leading with teammate C. J. Massinburg to a MAC title in 2017, as he also won the MAC Sixth Man of the Year Award. Perkins helped Buffalo start off his junior season with a 7-0 record for the first time since 1930, as he saw significant improvement in his junior season putting up 16.2 points and grabbed 6.0 rebounds per game, earning him All-MAC honors and MAC Sixth Man of the Year once again. In his final year of college ball he saw some decrease in points, as he only put up 14.6 per game, but a significant improvement in rebounding, putting up 7.4 per game, again for the second year in a row earning All-MAC honors and the MAC Sixth Man of the Year Award. In the NCAA Tournament, Perkins contributed 21 points and 10 rebounds in the win over Arizona State and had 17 points and 10 rebounds in a loss to Texas Tech. Perkins finished his college career averaging 12.8 points and 6.1 rebounds per game and shooting 45 percent from the field. He played in the NABC Reese's All-Star Game and was named to All-Tournament team at the Portsmouth Invitational Tournament.

== Professional career ==
After going undrafted in the 2019 NBA draft, Nick Perkins signed with the Los Angeles Lakers for NBA Summer League play. On July 3, 2019, Nick Perkins put up 20 points and 11 rebounds in an NBA Summer League win over the Sacramento Kings. Despite a good performance in the 2019 NBA Summer League, Nick Perkins was not offered a training camp contract going into the NBA Preseason.

On August 10, 2019, Perkins signed with the Niigata Albirex BB of the Japanese B.League. On November 10, he scored 34 points in a 97-92 overtime victory over the Sunrockers Shibuya. He averaged over 20 points and 9 rebounds per game in Japan. Perkins signed with New Basket Brindisi of the Lega Basket Serie A on August 9, 2020.

A year later, on August 9, 2020, Perkins signed in Italy with New Basket Brindisi in the Serie A for one year. Perkins averaged 13.4 points and 5.4 rebounds per game. He inked a two-year extension with the team on July 18, 2021.

Perkins has participated in The Basketball Tournament (TBT), an annual $1 million winner-take-all tournament, for Blue Collar U, a team primarily rostered with Buffalo alumni. In TBT 2021, the team reached the semifinals before being eliminated by Team 23. In TBT 2022, Blue Collar U won the tournament and $1 million prize. Perkins was named to the All-Tournament Team in both 2021 and 2022.

On July 21, 2023, Perkins signed with Nagasaki Velca of the Japanese B.League.

On March 30, 2024, Perkins signed with Indios de Mayagüez of the Baloncesto Superior Nacional (BSN).

On July 30, 2024, Perkins signed with TSG GhostHawks of the P. League+.

On August 8, 2026, he signed with Sabah BC of the Azerbaijan Basketball League.

== Career statistics ==
Legend
GP	Games played	GS	Games started	MPG	Minutes per game
FG%	Field goal percentage	3P%	3-point field goal percentage	FT%	Free throw percentage
RPG	Rebounds per game	APG	Assists per game	SPG	Steals per game
BPG	Blocks per game	PPG	Points per game	**Bold**	Career high

=== B-League ===
==== Regular season ====
Year	Team	GP	GS	MPG	FG%	3P%	FT%	RPG	APG	SPG	BPG	PPG
2019–20	Niigata Albirex BB	31	36	35.9	51.2	30.0	60.9	10.0	1.3	.6	.5	21.0
Career		31	36	35.9	51.2	30.0	60.9	10.0	1.3	.6	.5	21.0
