= C. J. Massinburg =

American basketball player (born 1997)

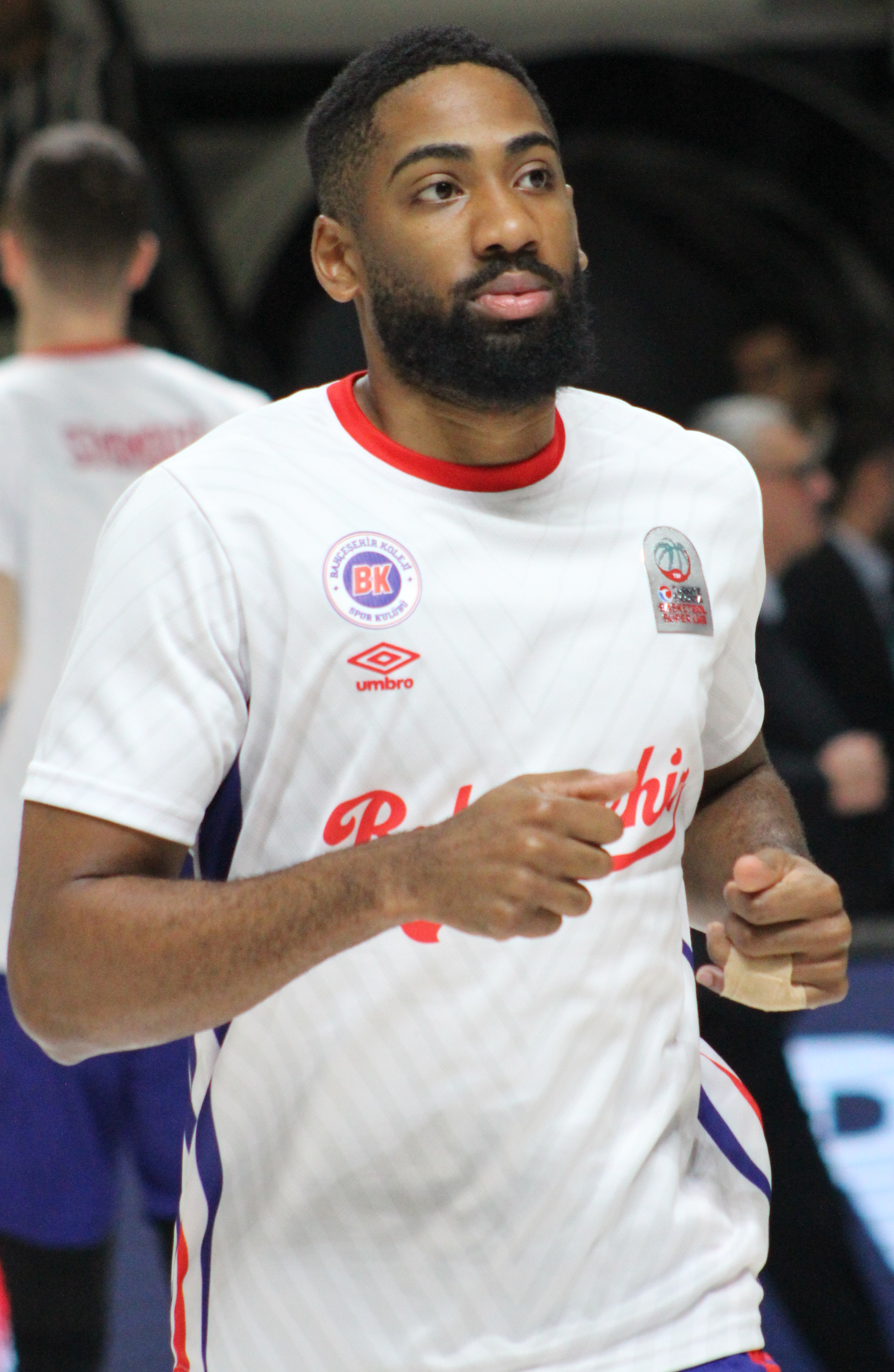
- Massinburg in 2024

No. 5 – Tezenis Verona
- Position: Shooting guard
- League: LBA

Personal information
- Born: April 14, 1997 (age 29) Dallas, Texas, U.S.
- Listed height: 6 ft 5 in (1.96 m)
- Listed weight: 202 lb (92 kg)

Career information
- High school: South Oak Cliff (Dallas, Texas)
- College: Buffalo (2015–2019)
- NBA draft: 2019: undrafted
- Playing career: 2019–present

Career history
- 2019–2021: Long Island Nets
- 2021–2022: Limoges CSP
- 2022–2024: Pallacanestro Brescia
- 2024–2025: Bahçeşehir Koleji
- 2025–2026: Pallacanestro Brescia
- 2026–present: Scaligera Basket Verona

Career highlights
- Italian Cup winner (2023); LBA Most Improved Player (2024); MAC Player of the Year (2019); 2× First-team All-MAC (2018, 2019); MAC All-Freshman Team (2016)
- Stats at Basketball Reference

Christian Jalon Massinburg (born April 14, 1997) is an American professional basketball player for Scaligera Basket Verona of the Lega Basket Serie A (LBA). He played college basketball for the Buffalo Bulls. He was named the 2019 Mid-American Conference Player of the Year.

== Early life ==
Born and raised in Dallas, Massinburg came to Buffalo from South Oak Cliff High School. As a senior, he averaged 22.3 points per game, but initially received no NCAA Division I offers. He ultimately signed with the Bulls after being scouted playing on a travel team for unsigned seniors.

== College career ==
In his freshman season, Massinburg was not expected to contribute much, but ended up playing a key role off the bench averaging 11.3 points and 4.1 rebounds per game, earning a spot on the Mid-American Conference (MAC) All-Freshman Team. As a sophomore, Massinburg's progress was slowed by missing the first eight games of the season due to a bout with mononucleosis, but he improved his scoring to 14.5 points per game as he moved into the starting lineup. As a junior, Massinburg was named first-team All-MAC as the Bulls enjoyed regular-season and Tournament conference championships, earning a trip to the 2018 NCAA tournament. Massinburg scored 19 points in the Bulls' upset over 4-seed Arizona in the NCAA Tournament's first round, thought to be the biggest win in program history at the time.

As a senior, Buffalo was the overwhelming preseason choice to win the MAC and Massinburg was named preseason first-team All-MAC East. The Bulls experienced great team success, as the team achieved a top 25 ranking in the November 12, 2018 AP Poll, signifying a first for the school. The Bulls would go on to maintain a spot in the top 25 for the remainder of the year. Massinburg led the team in scoring, moving into the school's top five all-time scoring list on January 29, 2019. He received national individual recognition as he was named to three watch lists for several national Player of the Year awards. Massinburg closed the 2018–19 regular season averaging 18.5 points per game and winning MAC Player of the Year honors and repeating on the all-conference first team.

The Buffalo News named Massinburg the best player of the decade from Buffalo, Canisius, Niagara, or St. Bonaventure. He was also named to the Lou Henson Award All-Decade Team.

== Professional career ==
=== Long Island Nets (2019–2021) ===
On October 15, 2019, Massinburg signed with the Brooklyn Nets of the National Basketball Association (NBA). On October 18, the Nets waived Massinburg. He was ultimately added to the roster of the Nets’ NBA G League affiliate, the Long Island Nets. On November 15, Massinburg contributed 28 points, six rebounds and three assists in a loss to the Delaware Blue Coats. He missed a game against the Canton Charge on December 30 for undisclosed reasons. Massinburg missed more than a month of action due to a right knee injury before returning against the Grand Rapids Drive on January 27, 2020.

=== Limoges CSP (2021–2022) ===
On September 14, 2021, Massinburg was signed by Limoges CSP of the LNB Pro A, the top tier men's basketball league in France.

=== Pallacanestro Brescia (2022–2024) ===
In June 2022, Massinburg signed a two-year contract with Pallacanestro Brescia of Lega Basket Serie A.

=== Bahçeşehir Koleji (2024–2025) ===
On June 1, 2024, he signed with Bahçeşehir Koleji of the Basketbol Süper Ligi (BSL).

=== Return to Pallacanestro Brescia (2025–2026) ===
On July 7, 2025, he signed with Pallacanestro Brescia of the Lega Basket Serie A (LBA) for a second stint.

=== Scaligera Basket Verona (2026–present) ===
On July 9, 2026, he signed with Scaligera Basket Verona of the Italian Lega Basket Serie A (LBA).

=== The Basketball Tournament ===
Massinburg has played in The Basketball Tournament (TBT), an annual $1 million winner-take-all tournament, for Blue Collar U, a team primarily rostered with Buffalo alumni. In TBT 2021, the team made it to the semifinals of the tournament. In TBT 2022, Blue Collar U won the tournament and $1 million prize, with Massinburg being named tournament MVP.

== Career statistics ==
Legend
GP	Games played	GS	Games started	MPG	Minutes per game
FG%	Field goal percentage	3P%	3-point field goal percentage	FT%	Free throw percentage
RPG	Rebounds per game	APG	Assists per game	SPG	Steals per game
BPG	Blocks per game	PPG	Points per game	**Bold**	Career high

=== College ===
Year	Team	GP	GS	MPG	FG%	3P%	FT%	RPG	APG	SPG	BPG	PPG
2015–16	Buffalo	35	7	25.3	.447	.389	.752	4.1	1.7	1.1	**.4**	11.3
2016–17	Buffalo	24	18	32.4	.411	.331	.750	5.6	2.8	.6	.1	14.5
2017–18	Buffalo	**36**	**35**	**34.0**	**.468**	**.405**	.743	**7.3**	2.4	1.1	**.4**	17.0
2018–19	Buffalo	35	34	32.1	.464	.399	**.780**	6.5	**3.0**	**1.2**	.3	**18.2**
Career		130	94	30.8	.452	.386	.757	5.9	2.4	1.1	.3	15.3
