= Fraternal Order Orioles =

American social and charitable organization

Fraternal Order Orioles is a social and charitable organization that was founded in August 1910. The organization currently consists of about 54 local Nests and affiliated Auxiliaries located in nine states in the eastern United States.

== History ==
The Order was founded in Rochester, New York. The Order was originally named the Order of Owls, but another fraternal order of the name had a court issue an injunction against using that name.

At its 1923 convention in Reading, Pennsylvania the delegates voted 241 to 8 for a modification of the Prohibition Amendment that would allow the manufacture of light wine and beers. They also decided to only vote for congressmen who were in favor of such a prohibition.

== Organization ==
As stated above, local unites are called "Subordinate Nests"; state or provincial groups are called "Grand Nests" and the national structure is the "Supreme Nest", which meets in convention annually. The head of the order is a "Supreme Worthy President" and the head of a local Nest is "Worthy President". In the early 1920s the Order had a $150,000 headquarters in Buffalo, New York. By the 1970s the headquarters had moved to Reading, Pennsylvania. The headquarters is currently listed as a Post Office Box in DeBary, Florida.

== Membership ==
Membership comes in three categories: good standing, which makes the member eligible for benefits in case of an accident; social membership, which is membership without benefits; and honorary membership, which is for people who do not live near a local Nest. Women are eligible to join local auxiliary units connected to the local Nests.

The Order had 143,000 members in 208 Nests in the early 1920s, 12,649 in 1979 in 57 Nests and 10,000 members "about a decade later". As of 2023, 36 Nests continue to operate.

== Benefits ==
The Order benefits are allocated on an ad hoc basis for sickness, accident or injuries. This is not an insurance function, but more a form of charity that the Order is not obliged to pay.

== Ritual ==
The Order has a ritual that was meant to be secret. It resembles many of the other fraternal societies of the day, with an altar in the center of the lodge room, a Bible, and prayers. In addition to the Initiatory Degree, there is also a Supreme Degree, both awarded by the Supreme Nest. The FOOs watchwords are liberty, integrity, on the Orders emblem. The order also has passwords, though it does not consider itself a secret society.
