= Shannon Evans =

American basketball player (born 1994)

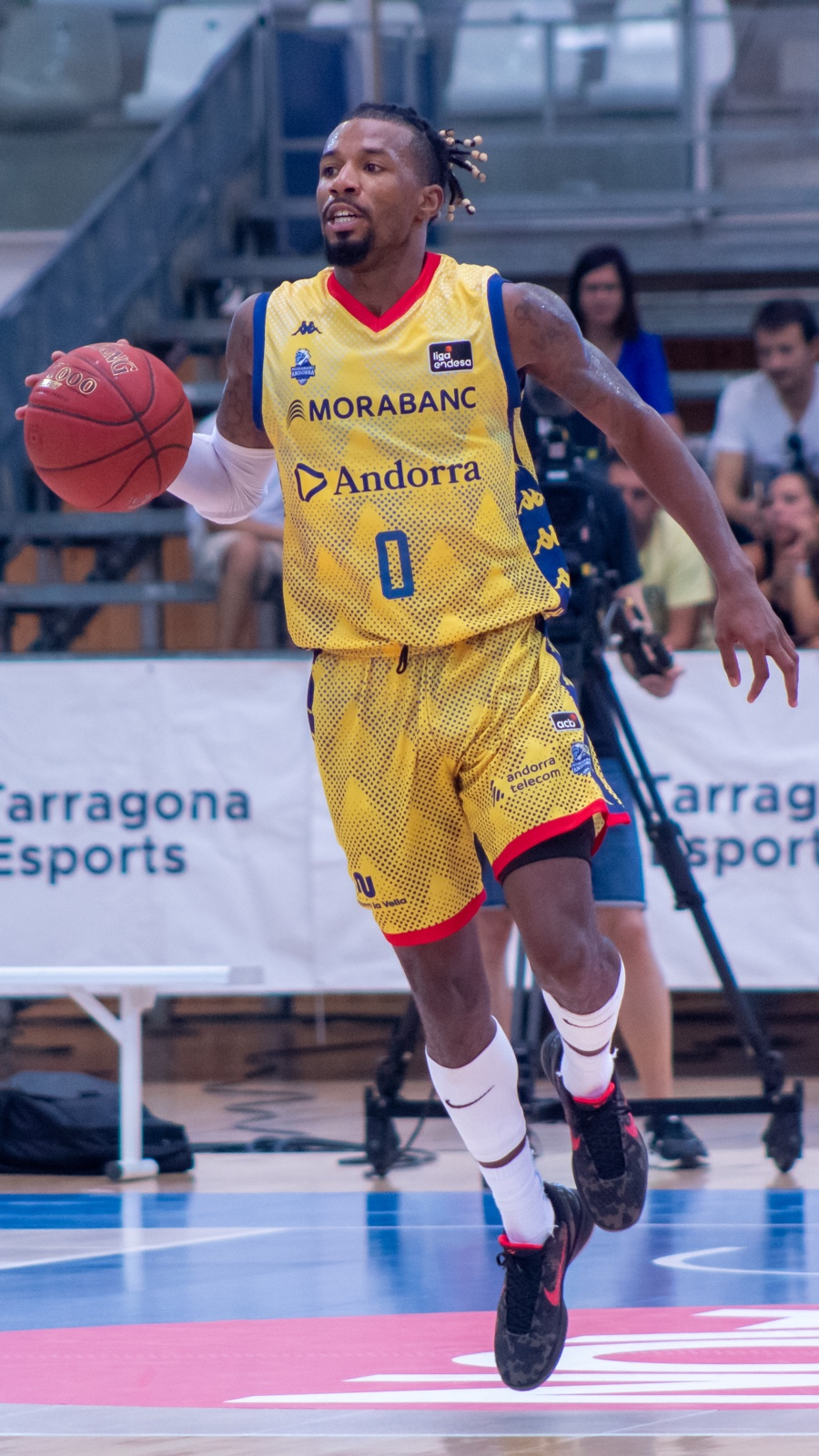
- Evans with Andorra in 2024

No. 2 – San Pablo Burgos
- Position: Point guard
- League: Liga ACB; EuroCup

Personal information
- Born: July 19, 1994 (age 32) Suffolk, Virginia, U.S.
- Listed height: 6 ft 1 in (1.85 m)
- Listed weight: 172 lb (78 kg)

Career information
- High school: Nansemond River (Suffolk, Virginia); Hargrave Military Academy (Chatham, Virginia)
- College: Buffalo (2013–2015); Arizona State (2016–2018)
- NBA draft: 2018: undrafted
- Playing career: 2018–present

Career history
- 2018–2020: Atomerőmű SE
- 2020: Pau-Orthez
- 2020–2021: Bahçeşehir Koleji
- 2021–2023: Real Betis
- 2023: Valencia
- 2023: Beijing Ducks
- 2024: Joventut
- 2024–2026: Andorra
- 2025: Satria Muda Pertamina
- 2026: Promitheas Patras
- 2026–present: San Pablo Burgos

Career highlights
- All-Liga ACB Second Team (2022); 2× Liga ACB assists leader (2022, 2026); Second-team All-MAC (2015)

Shannon Eugene Evans II (born July 19, 1994) is an American-Guinean basketball player for San Pablo Burgos of the Liga ACB and the EuroCup. He competed in college for Buffalo and Arizona State. His nickname is Shannito.

== Early life ==
Evans is the son of Shannon and Armona Evans. He was a multi-sport athlete growing up, playing cornerback and receiver in football as well as playing center field in baseball, though basketball remained his favorite. At Nansemond River High School, Evans was coached by Ed Young, and the two had a contentious relationship. He joined the varsity team as a sophomore but Young sent him down to junior varsity since he did not think Evans was ready. As a junior, Evans started the season as a bench player but joined the starting lineup after scoring 27 points in his first start. He received some college looks after his senior season, but his SAT scores did not qualify him for a college scholarship, so he opted for a postgraduate year at prep school Hargrave Military Academy. His parents, grandparents, and great-aunt helped him pay for tuition, with his mother cashing out her 401(k) account. Evans received scholarship offers before his first game and committed to Buffalo.

== College career ==
At Buffalo, Evans averaged 8.5 points per game. He averaged 15.4 points, 3.2 rebounds, and 4.6 assists per game as a sophomore, shooting 38 percent from the three-point line, and led the Bulls to their first NCAA Tournament. Evans was named to the Second-team All-MAC. After his sophomore season, Buffalo coach Bobby Hurley was hired at Arizona State, and Evans decided to follow him despite his mother's objections. As a junior, Evans was second to Tra Holder on the team with 15.0 points per game and was fifth in the conference in assists with 4.4 a game.

Evans began his senior season well, scoring 22 points in a win over Xavier on November 24, 2017. Evans scored 22 points in a win against Kansas two weeks later and was named Oscar Robertson National Player of the Week. Evans's shooting then fell off, and he missed 15 consecutive 3-point attempts at one point. He averaged 16.5 points, 3.3 rebounds and 3.5 assists per game and led Arizona State to the NCAA Tournament. As a senior, Evans was named Honorable Mention All-Pac-12.

== Professional career ==
=== Atomerőmű SE (2018–2020) ===
After going undrafted in the 2018 NBA draft, Evans played for the Houston Rockets in the NBA Summer League. In August 2018, he signed with Atomerőmű SE of the Hungarian league. On November 22, 2018, Evans scored 24 points, 4 rebounds, 4 assists, 4 steals, and 1 block in a victory against Pecsi VSK-Veolia. In his first year, Evans appeared in thirteen games for Atomerőmű SE and averaged 15.9 points, 2.7 rebounds, and 4.2 assists. On November 1, 2019, Evans scored 29 points, 5 rebounds, 4 assists, and 3 steals in a victory against Zalakerámia ZTE. In his final year, Evans appeared in twenty games for Atomerőmű SE averaged 18 points, 3.7 rebounds, and 6.9 assists.

=== Pau-Orthez (2020) ===
On June 23, 2020, Evans signed with Pau-Orthez of the French LNB Pro A. On November 5, he was named player of the week after posting 27 points and 11 assists in a 90–81 victory over Le Mans Sarthe Basket. Evans appeared in five games for Pau-Orthez and averaged 21.8 points, 2.8 rebounds and 8.4 assists.

=== Bahçeşehir Koleji (2020–2021) ===
On November 26, 2020, he signed with Bahçeşehir Koleji of the Turkish Basketball Super League (BSL). On January 1, 2021, Evans scored 20 points, 2 rebounds, 7 assists, and 1 steal in a loss against Tofaş Bursa. Evans appeared in eighteen games for Bahçeşehir Koleji and averaged 11 points, 2.1 rebounds and 4.2 assists.

=== Coosur Real Betis (2021–2023) ===
On August 4, 2021, Evans signed with Real Betis Baloncesto of the Liga ACB. During the 2022-2023 campaign, he was the leading scorer of the Liga ACB with 21 points per game.

=== Valencia Basket (2023) ===
On January 18, 2023, Evans signed with Valencia of the Spanish Liga ACB and the EuroLeague until the end of the season, with an option for an additional year. In 12 EuroLeague games, he averaged 5.5 points, 1.3 rebounds and 2.3 assists, playing around 13 minutes per contest. On June 25, 2023, his contract option was not picked up by Valencia and he became a free agent.

=== Joventut Badalona (2024) ===
On January 8, 2024, Evans signed with Joventut Badalona of the Spanish Liga ACB.

=== MoraBanc Andorra (2024–2026) ===
On June 27, 2024, he signed with MoraBanc Andorra of the Spanish Liga ACB. Evans averaged 13.9 points with 4.7 assists per game. He extended his contract with the team on July 9, 2025.

=== San Pablo Burgos (2026–present) ===
On November 20, 2026, Evans signed with San Pablo Burgos of the Liga ACB and the EuroCup.
