= Jeremy Harris (basketball) =

American basketball player (born 1996)

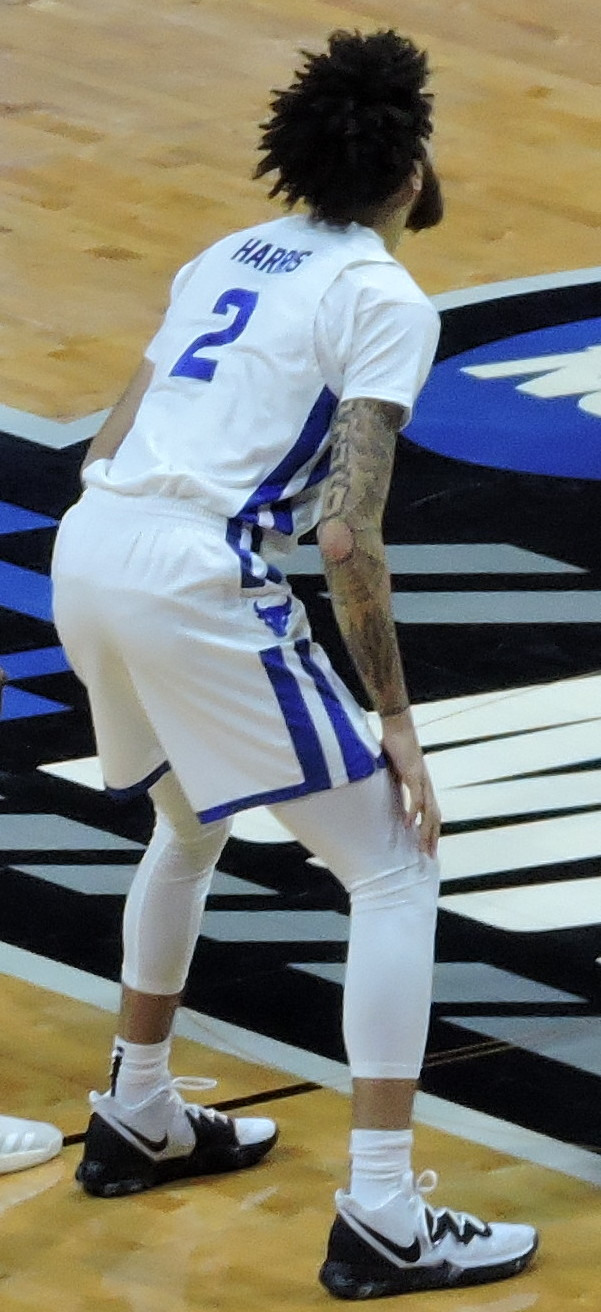
- Harris playing for Buffalo

No. 5 – Windsor Express
- Position: Shooting guard / small forward
- League: Basketball Super League

Personal information
- Born: September 10, 1996 (age 30) Greensboro, North Carolina, U.S.
- Listed height: 6 ft 7 in (2.01 m)
- Listed weight: 185 lb (84 kg)

Career information
- High school: Walter H. Page (Greensboro, North Carolina)
- College: Gulf Coast State (2015–2017); Buffalo (2017–2019)
- NBA draft: 2019: undrafted
- Playing career: 2019–present

Career history
- 2019–2020: Atomerőmű SE
- 2020–2021: Borås Basket
- 2021–2023: Sudbury Five
- 2023–2024: KB Bashkimi
- 2024–present: Windsor Express

Career highlights
- 2× Second-team All-MAC (2018, 2019); MAC tournament MVP (2019)

Jeremy Tyler Harris II (born September 10, 1996) is an American professional basketball player for the Windsor Express of the Basketball Super League. He played college basketball Buffalo Bulls of the Mid-American Conference (MAC).

== High school career ==
As a senior at Page High School, Harris led the team to the 2014 NCHSAA 4-A state tournament. Harris was the No. 8-rated prep player in North Carolina coming out of high school.

== College career ==
He competed for two seasons at Gulf Coast State College. In his freshman season at Gulf Coast, he averaged 13.7 points and 6.3 rebounds per game. As a sophomore, Harris posted 18.7 points and 5.2 rebounds per game.

After his sophomore season, Harris committed to play for Buffalo over Texas Tech because he liked the coaching style. Harris had 22 points and a career-high 14 rebounds in an 83–69 victory over Eastern Michigan Eagles men's basketball on January 23, 2018. He scored a career-high 27 points, pulled down 10 rebounds and dished out three assists in a March 8 win over Central Michigan. As a junior, Harris averaged 15.4 points, 5.8 rebounds. 2.3 assists and 1.0 steals per game, shooting 42 percent behind the arc. He was named to the Second-team All-Mid-American Conference at the conclusion of his junior season. Harris led the Bulls to an 89–68 upset over the fourth-seeded Arizona in the NCAA Tournament, contributing 23 points and seven rebounds. As a senior, Harris averaged 14 points and 6.2 rebounds per game, helping the Bulls to their second straight NCAA Tournament appearance. He was named the Mid-American Conference tournament Most Valuable Player.

== Professional career ==
After going undrafted in the 2019 NBA draft, Harris signed with Atomerőmű SE of the NB I/A. He averaged 6.8 points per game in his rookie season. On August 2, 2020, Harris signed with Borås Basket in Sweden.

On November 24, 2024, Harris signed with the Windsor Express of the Basketball Super League.

== Career statistics ==
Legend
GP	Games played	GS	Games started	MPG	Minutes per game
FG%	Field goal percentage	3P%	3-point field goal percentage	FT%	Free throw percentage
RPG	Rebounds per game	APG	Assists per game	SPG	Steals per game
BPG	Blocks per game	PPG	Points per game	**Bold**	Career high

=== College ===
Year	Team	GP	GS	MPG	FG%	3P%	FT%	RPG	APG	SPG	BPG	PPG
2017–18	Buffalo	**36**	**36**	**33.3**	**.471**	**.418**	**.787**	5.9	2.1	1.0	**.7**	**15.5**
2018–19	Buffalo	**36**	**36**	31.2	.418	.270	.724	**6.2**	**3.0**	**1.1**	**.7**	14.0
Career		72	72	32.2	.444	.342	.755	6.0	2.6	1.1	.7	14.8
