= Nate Oats =

American basketball coach (born 1974)

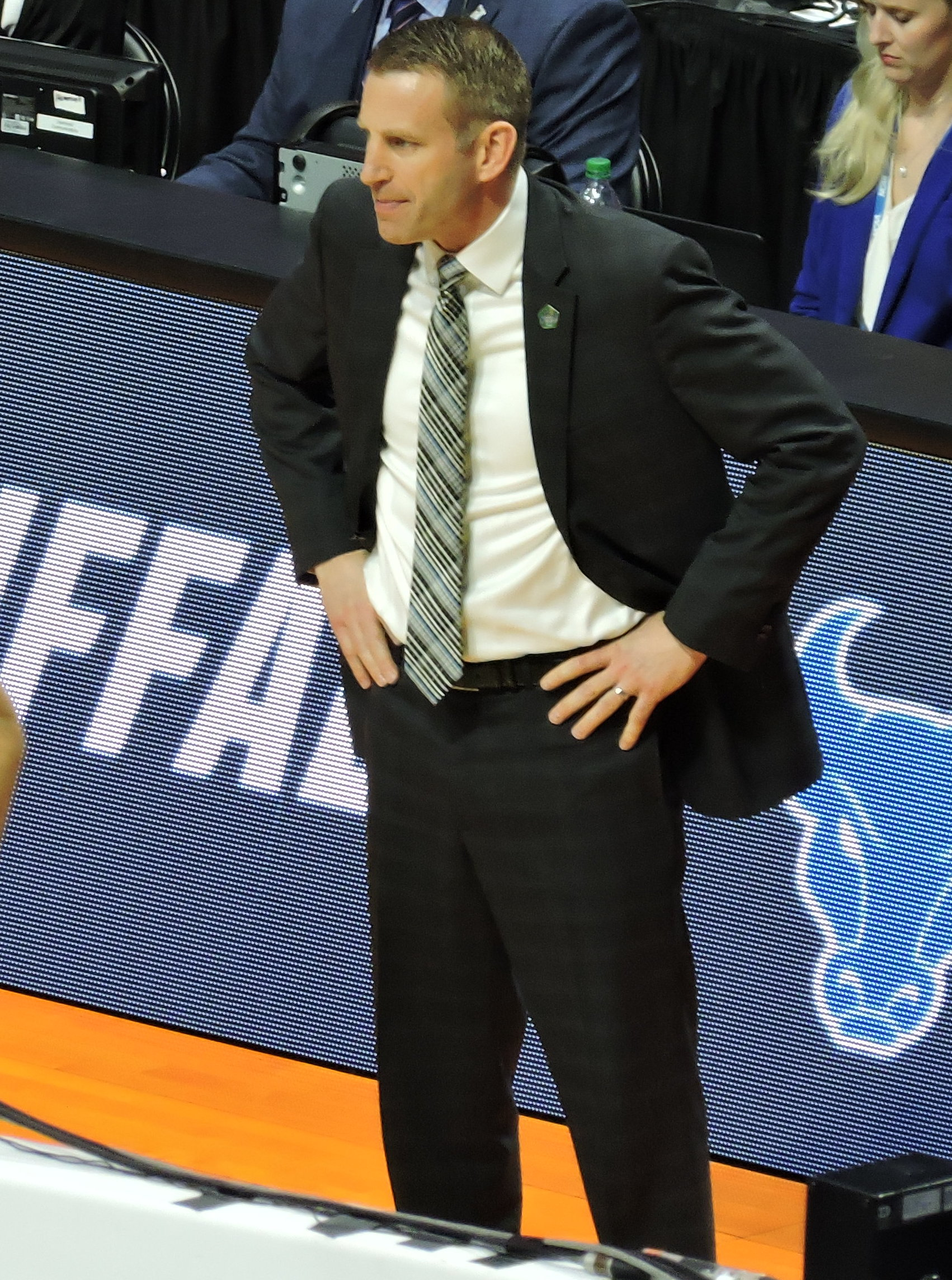
- Oats in 2019

Current position
- Title: Head coach
- Team: Alabama
- Conference: SEC
- Record: 175–73 (.706)

Biographical details
- Born: October 13, 1974 (age 52); Watertown, Wisconsin, U.S.

Playing career
- 1993–1997: Maranatha Baptist

Coaching career (HC unless noted)
- 1997–2000: Maranatha Baptist (assistant)
- 2000–2002: Wisconsin–Whitewater (assistant)
- 2002–2013: Romulus HS (MI)
- 2013–2015: Buffalo (assistant)
- 2015–2019: Buffalo
- 2019–present: Alabama

Head coaching record
- Overall: 271–116 (.700) (college); 222–52 (.810) (high school)
- Tournaments: 15–9 (NCAA Division I)

Accomplishments and honors

Championships
- NCAA Division I Regional – Final Four (2024); 3 MAC tournament (2016, 2018, 2019); 2 MAC regular season (2018, 2019); 2 MAC East Division (2018, 2019); 2 SEC tournament (2021, 2023); 2 SEC regular season (2021, 2023)

Awards
- 2× MAC Coach of the Year (2018, 2019); SEC Coach of the Year (2021)

Nathanael Justin Oats (born October 13, 1974) is an American basketball coach, currently the head men's basketball coach at the University of Alabama. Prior to Alabama, he was the head coach at the University at Buffalo.

== Early life, education, and playing career ==
Oats grew up in Watertown, Wisconsin, where he was a three-year starter on the Maranatha Academy high school basketball team which went 24–0 in his senior year. He stayed in Watertown after high school, playing college basketball at NCCAA Division II/NCAA Division III Maranatha Baptist University. He was an all-conference player and served as a captain of the Crusaders while earning a bachelor's degree in math education. He subsequently received a Master of Science from the University of Wisconsin-Madison in kinesiology and exercise science.

== Coaching career ==
After finishing his playing career at Maranatha Baptist, Oats became a member of the team's coaching staff in 1997, where he remained until 2000. He then served as an assistant men's basketball coach for the Division-III University of Wisconsin–Whitewater. After the 2002 season, Oats left Wisconsin–Whitewater to become the head basketball coach and a teacher at Romulus High School near Detroit.

Over 11 years at Romulus, Oats accumulated a 222–52 record and reached the semifinals of the state tournament five times. In 2013, Oats led the team to a 27–1 record and a state Class A championship en route to winning multiple coach of the year honors from the local press. He won similar coaching awards in 2005, 2008 and 2009.

=== Buffalo ===
While recruiting Romulus guard E. C. Matthews on behalf of Rhode Island in 2013, Bobby Hurley was impressed by Oats' coaching. Shortly thereafter, Hurley was named the head coach at Buffalo and hired Oats as an assistant on his staff.

During his two-year tenure as an assistant, Buffalo had a 42–20 record, won their first Mid-American Conference tournament and made their first ever NCAA tournament appearance. As an assistant at Buffalo, Oats was credited with recruiting Justin Moss, who would go on to win the 2014–15 MAC Player of the Year award.

On April 9, 2015, the same day that Bobby Hurley announced that he would be leaving Buffalo to take the head coaching job at Arizona State, Oats was named the interim head coach at Buffalo. During the days immediately after Hurley announced his departure, Buffalo's athletic director at the time, Danny White, interviewed the team's players, all of whom advocated for Oats becoming the permanent head coach. Also, Hurley told White that he would hire Oats at Arizona State if White did not hire him permanently. In a 2019 ESPN story on Oats, White recalled, "What stood out is the connections he had with our players. His reputation as a high school coach – most people I asked said he ran it like a Division I college program. Players had a strong relationship with him." On April 13, Oats was officially given the head coaching job; his base salary was $250,000. The Buffalo roster for his first season as a head coach featured two former Romulus players: Christian Pino and Raheem Johnson.

In Oats' first season as head coach of Buffalo, he led the Bulls to a 3rd place tie in the Mid-American Conference standings. In the MAC Tournament, Buffalo defeated Miami University, Ohio, and then top-seeded Akron to claim the 2016 conference tournament championship. This has been regarded as an impressive feat due to the off-season turnaround that Oats faced. 2015 MAC Player of the Year Justin Moss was dismissed from the university and second-leading scorer Shannon Evans transferred to Arizona State to play for the newly departed Bobby Hurley. On May 18, 2016, Buffalo Athletic Director Allen Greene announced that the school had agreed on a new five-year contract with Oats.

In Oats' third season, 2017–18, the Bulls began conference play with eight straight wins, the best conference start in team history. The Bulls finished the 2017–18 MAC schedule with a 15–3 record, and Oats was named MAC coach of the year as the Bulls won outright the conference regular season for the first time in team history. The Bulls went on to win the 2018 MAC tournament. On March 8, 2018, Oats signed a contract extension with the University at Buffalo to remain head basketball coach through 2023. Oats' Buffalo Bulls went on to the 2018 NCAA Tournament seeded 13th in the South Region where they convincingly beat the favored 4th seed Arizona Wildcats 89–68.

Oats briefly described his coaching philosophy in the aforementioned 2019 ESPN story, saying, "We did a culture playbook two summers ago and our three main beliefs — core values, we call them — are max effort, continuous growth and selfless love." Since taking over as Buffalo head coach, Oats added what the story called "a blue-collar element to his program that reflects Buffalo itself" — the coaching staff charts what it calls "blue-collar points", defined as any play that contributes to a win but is not recorded in a traditional box score, with examples including but not limited to pass deflections and taking charges. The player with the most such points in a given game receives a construction helmet.

During the 2018–19 regular season, Oats led the Bulls to a 28–3 record and was named 2019 MAC Coach of the Year. On March 14, 2019, Oats signed a contract extension with the University at Buffalo to remain head basketball coach through the 2024 season.

=== Alabama ===
On March 27, 2019, athletic director Greg Byrne named Oats the head coach of the Alabama Crimson Tide. His tenure as of 2021 was viewed as relatively successful, having qualified for the NCAA Tournament in two straight seasons. This success led to Oats signing a 3-year contract extension in February 2021 to remain at Alabama through the 2027 season. This extension also raised Oats' annual compensation to $3.225 million.

At the conclusion of the 2020–21 regular season, and in his second season as head coach, Oats won the SEC Coach of the Year award. The Tide won the SEC regular-season and tournament titles and made the NCAA tournament for the first time since 2018. They lost the Sweet Sixteen game in overtime to UCLA, 88–78.

Oats led Alabama to the NCAA tournament for four straight seasons, and in 2022–23, the Tide tallied a school-record 31 wins and were (for the first time ever) the top overall seed in the NCAA tournament as both SEC regular season and tournament champions. The month prior to the tournament, Tide star forward Brandon Miller was implicated in as a connection in the shooting death of Jamea Harris just off the Tuscaloosa Strip where it was alleged that Miller handed the gun to former teammate Darius Miles. When asked about it, Oats described Miller as being in the "Wrong spot at the wrong time", which drew debate; Miller ultimately was not charged. The Tide would lose to San Diego State in the Sweet 16. Alabama entered the 2024 NCAA tournament as a 4 seed. On March 30, 2024, Oats led the Crimson Tide to a victory of 89-82 over the Clemson Tigers and secured Alabama's first Final Four appearance in the program’s history.

Oats has the most NCAA tournament wins in school history, with 13 as of the 2026 tournament.

== Personal life ==
Oats and his wife Crystal have three daughters. In November 2015, Oats announced on his Facebook page that his wife had an aggressive form of lymphoma and would be undergoing chemotherapy. With his wife's encouragement, he confirmed that he would not be renouncing his coaching duties. In 2023, they divorced after 26 years of marriage.

On July 26, 2026, Oats married former University of Alabama staffer Alex Acetta, who was 31 years old at the time of their wedding.

Oats is a Christian.

== Head coaching record ==
Record table
Season	Team	Overall	Conference	Standing	Postseason
Buffalo Bulls (Mid-American Conference) (2015–2019)
2015–16	Buffalo	20–15	10–8	T–3rd (East)	NCAA Division I Round of 64
2016–17	Buffalo	17–15	11–7	3rd (East)	
2017–18	Buffalo	27–9	15–3	1st (East)	NCAA Division I Round of 32
2018–19	Buffalo	32–4	16–2	1st (East)	NCAA Division I Round of 32
Buffalo:		96–43 (.691)	52–20 (.722)		
Alabama Crimson Tide (Southeastern Conference) (2019–present)
2019–20	Alabama	16–15	8–10	9th	
2020–21	Alabama	26–7	16–2	1st	NCAA Division I Sweet 16
2021–22	Alabama	19–14	9–9	T–5th	NCAA Division I Round of 64
2022–23	Alabama	31–6	16–2	1st	NCAA Division I Sweet 16
2023–24	Alabama	25–12	13–5	T–2nd	NCAA Division I Final Four
2024–25	Alabama	28–9	13–5	3rd	NCAA Division I Elite Eight
2025–26	Alabama	25–10	13–5	T–2nd	NCAA Division I Sweet 16
2026–27	Alabama	5–0	0–0		
Alabama:		175–73 (.706)	87–38 (.696)		
Total:		271–116 (.700)			
National champion Postseason invitational champion Conference regular season champion Conference regular season and conference tournament champion Division regular season champion Division regular season and conference tournament champion Conference tournament champion
