= Blake Hamilton =

American professional basketball player

No. 0 – APOEL
- Position: Shooting guard / small forward
- League: Cyprus Basketball Division A

Personal information
- Born: October 26, 1994 (age 32)
- Listed height: 6 ft 6 in (1.98 m)
- Listed weight: 205 lb (93 kg)

Career information
- High school: Pasadena (Pasadena, California)
- College: Northern Arizona (2012–2013); Mt. San Antonio (2013–2015); Buffalo (2015–2017)
- NBA draft: 2017: undrafted
- Playing career: 2017–present

Career history
- 2017–2018: Ventspils
- 2018: BM Slam Stal
- 2018–2019: AEL Limassol
- 2019: Panionios
- 2019: Larisa
- 2020–present: APOEL

Career highlights
- Latvian League champion (2018); Second-team All-MAC (2017); Third-team All-MAC (2016)

Blake Ellis Hamilton (born October 26, 1994) is an American professional basketball player for APOEL of Cyprus Basketball Division 1. He played college basketball at Buffalo.

== Early life and high school ==
Hamilton was born and grew up in Pasadena, California and attended Pasadena High School. As a senior, he averaged 16 points, 11 rebounds and four blocks per game and was named first team All-Area by the Pasadena Star-News as the Bulldogs won the CIF Southern Section 3AA state title.

== College career ==
=== Northern Arizona ===
Hamilton began his career at Northern Arizona, playing in 18 games and averaging 3.8 points per game as a freshman before opting to leave the program at the end of the season.

=== Mt. San Antonio College ===
Hamilton transferred to Mt. San Antonio College for his sophomore season. He averaged 13.5 and 6.4 rebounds per game for the Mounties and was named first team All-South Coast Conference North Division.

=== Buffalo ===
Hamilton then transferred to the University of Buffalo and played for the Bulls over his final two years of eligibility. He averaged 13.1 points per and 7.1 rebounds per game in his first season with the team and was named third team All-Mid-American Conference (MAC). Hamilton made a game winning three-pointer in the final of the 2016 MAC men's basketball tournament over top-seeded Akron to send the Bulls to the NCAA tournament. As a senior, Hamilton lead the team with 17.5 point per game and 141 assists and was named second team All-MAC. He finished his career with the Bulls with 1,004 points, 438 rebounds, 226 assists and 122 three-pointers made.

== Professional career ==
=== Ventspils ===
Hamilton signed with BK Ventspils of the Latvian Basketball League (LBL) on July 17, 2017. He averaged 10.2 points, 5.9 rebounds, 2.8 assists and 1.9 steals over 16 LBL games and 8.7 points, 5.9 rebounds, 2.2 assists and 1.2 steals in 13 Basketball Champions League games.

=== BM Slam Stal ===
Hamilton signed with BM Slam Stal Ostrów Wielkopolski of the Polish Basketball League on September 5, 2018. He left the team on November 20, 2018 after appearing in six games and averaging 8.5 points, 2.8 rebounds, 2.3 assists and 1.0 steal per game.

=== Proteas EKA ===
Hamilton signed with Proteas EKA AEL of Cyprus Basketball Division 1 on December 12, 2018. He averaged 17.3 points in nine games with the team.

=== Panionios ===
Hamilton then signed with Panionios on February 15, 2019. Through the end of the 2018–19 Greek Basket League season, Hamilton averaged 7.8 points, 4.1 rebounds, and 1.3 assists over eight games.

=== Larisa ===
On September 6, 2019, Hamilton signed with another Greek Basket League club Larisa. On December 5, 2019, Hamilton left the team and was replaced by former NBA player Brandon Rush.

=== APOEL ===
Hamilton signed with APOEL of Cyprus Basketball Division 1 on February 9, 2020.

== Personal life ==
Hamilton's father played basketball collegiately at UTEP and his cousins Jordan, Isaac, and Daniel Hamilton are also professional basketball players.
