= Wes Clark (basketball) =

American basketball player (born 1994)

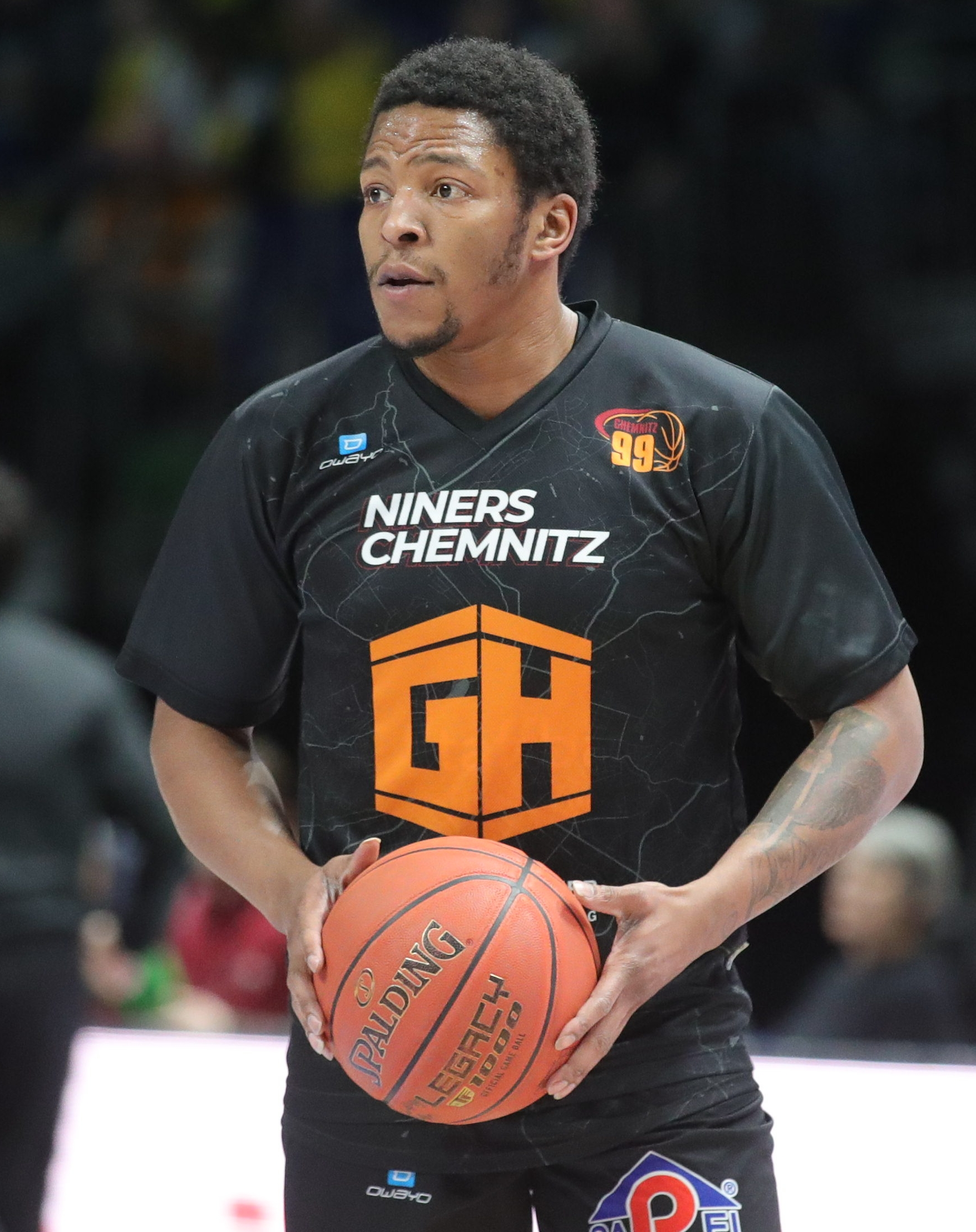
- Clark with Niners Chemnitz in 2023

Free Agent
- Position: Point guard / shooting guard

Personal information
- Born: December 12, 1994 (age 31) Detroit, Michigan, U.S.
- Listed height: 1.84 m (6 ft 0 in)
- Listed weight: 78 kg (172 lb)

Career information
- High school: Romulus Senior (Romulus, Michigan)
- College: Missouri (2013–2016); Buffalo (2017–2018)
- NBA draft: 2018: undrafted
- Playing career: 2018–present

Career history
- 2018–2019: New Basket Brindisi
- 2019–2020: Cantù
- 2020–2021: Niners Chemnitz
- 2021: Reyer Venezia
- 2021–2022: New Basket Brindisi
- 2022: Limoges CSP
- 2022–2023: Niners Chemnitz
- 2023–2024: Rostock Seawolves
- 2024: Yalovaspor Basketbol

Career highlights
- Third-team All-MAC (2018); MAC tournament MVP (2018)

Wes Clark (born December 12, 1994) is an American professional basketball player who last played for Yalovaspor Basketbol of the Basketbol Süper Ligi (BSL).

== College career ==
As a junior at Missouri, Clark averaged 9.8 points, 3 rebounds, 3 assists per game. He was dismissed from the team in February 2016 due to failing to meet the academic standards. Clark decided to transfer to Buffalo, whose coach Nate Oats was Clark's coach at Romulus Senior High School. As a senior at Buffalo, Clark averaged 15.5 points and 5.4 assists per game.

== Professional career ==
After completing his collegiate eligibility, Clark participated in the inaugural Dos Equis 3X3U National Championship. On August 2, 2018, Clark signed a deal with the Italian club New Basket Brindisi for the 2018–19 LBA season.

On July 23, 2019, he has signed with Pallacanestro Cantù of the Italian Lega Basket Serie A (LBA). Clark averaged 14.6 points, 3 rebounds and 3 assists per game. On June 25, 2020, he signed in France with SIG Strasbourg competing in the LNB Pro A. However, on August 25 he failed the medical examination and it was announced Clark would not join the team.

On November 4, 2020, Clark signed with Niners Chemnitz of the Basketball Bundesliga.

At the beginning of 2021, in mid-season, he makes his return to Italy signing for Reyer Venezia until the end of the 2020–21 season.

He returned to Brindisi in summer 2021 for two seasons until June 2023.

On September 22, 2022, he has signed with Limoges CSP of the LNB Pro A, as a medical replacement for Bryce Jones.

On October 26, 2022, he has signed with Niners Chemnitz of the Basketball Bundesliga (BBL) for a second stint.

On September 14, 2024, he signed with Yalovaspor Basketbol of the Basketbol Süper Ligi (BSL).
