= 2017–18 Akron Zips men's basketball team =

American college basketball season

2017–18 Akron Zips men's basketball
- Conference: Mid-American Conference
- East Division
- Record: 14–18 (6–12 MAC)
- Head coach: John Groce (1st season)
- Associate head coach: Dustin Ford
- Assistant coaches: Rob Fulford; Robby Pridgen
- Home arena: James A. Rhodes Arena

2017–18 Mid-American Conference men's basketball standings
	Conf.				Overall
Team	W		L	PCT	W		L	PCT
East
Buffalo †	15	–	3	.833	27	–	9	.750
Kent State	9	–	9	.500	17	–	17	.500
Miami (OH)	8	–	10	.444	16	–	18	.471
Bowling Green	7	–	11	.389	16	–	16	.500
Ohio	7	–	11	.389	14	–	17	.452
Akron	6	–	12	.333	14	–	18	.438
West
Toledo	13	–	5	.722	23	–	11	.676
Eastern Michigan	11	–	7	.611	22	–	13	.629
Ball State	10	–	8	.556	19	–	13	.594
Western Michigan	9	–	9	.500	17	–	15	.531
Central Michigan	7	–	11	.389	21	–	15	.583
Northern Illinois	6	–	12	.333	13	–	19	.406
† 2018 MAC tournament winner

The 2017–18 Akron Zips men's basketball team represented the University of Akron during the 2017–18 NCAA Division I men's basketball season. The Zips, led by first-year head coach John Groce, played their home games at the James A. Rhodes Arena as members of the East Division of the Mid-American Conference. They finished the season 14–18, 6–12 in MAC play to finish in last place in the East Division. In the MAC tournament, they defeated Western Michigan in the first round before losing to Eastern Michigan in the quarterfinals.

== Previous season ==
The Zips finished the 2016–17 season 27–9, 14–4 in MAC play to win the MAC East Division and MAC overall regular season championship. They defeated Eastern Michigan and Ball State to advance to the championship game of the MAC tournament where they lost to Kent State, losing in the championship game for the second consecutive year. As a regular season conference champion who failed to win their conference tournament, they received an automatic bid to the National Invitation Tournament where they defeated Houston in the first round before losing to Texas–Arlington.

Following the season, head coach Keith Dambrot left the school to accept the head coaching position at Duquesne. On April 5, 2017, the school hired former Ohio and Illinois head coach John Groce to replace Dambrot.

== Offseason ==
=== Recruiting class of 2017 ===
College recruiting information
Name	Hometown	School	Height	Weight	Commit date
Jaden Sayles; PF	Cincinnati, OH	Sycamore High School	6 ft 7 in (2.01 m)	200 lb (91 kg)	Jul 30, 2016
Jaden Sayles; PF	Recruit ratings: Scout: Rivals: (NR)				
Eric Parrish; SF	Houston, TX	Sunrise Christian Academy	6 ft 6 in (1.98 m)	190 lb (86 kg)	Oct 23, 2016
Eric Parrish; SF	Recruit ratings: Scout: Rivals: (NR)				
Overall recruit ranking:
Note: In many cases, Scout, Rivals, 247Sports, On3, and ESPN may conflict in their listings of height and weight.; In these cases, the average was taken. ESPN grades are on a 100-point scale.; Sources: "2017 Team Ranking". Rivals.

== Roster ==
2017–18 Akron Zips men's basketball team
Players
Coaches

Pos.	#	Name	Height	Weight	Year	Previous school	Hometown
G	11	Virshon Cotton	6 ft 1 in (1.85 m)	165 lb (75 kg)	Fr	Hillcrest Prep Academy	Milwaukee, WI
G	4	Malcolm Duvivier	6 ft 2 in (1.88 m)	210 lb (95 kg)	GS	St. Michael's College School	Toronto, Ontario
G	5	Craig Eubanks	6 ft 4 in (1.93 m)	200 lb (91 kg)	Sr	Glenville	Cleveland, OH
G	14	Sina Gbadebo	6 ft 1 in (1.85 m)	190 lb (86 kg)	Fr	Spire Institute	Windsor, Ontario
G	2	Eric Hester	6 ft 3 in (1.91 m)	170 lb (77 kg)	RS So	Oldsmar Christian	Clearwater, FL
G	0	Jimond Ivey	6 ft 5 in (1.96 m)	200 lb (91 kg)	Jr	Glenville	Cleveland, OH
G	1	Loren Cristian Jackson (redshirt)	5 ft 8 in (1.73 m)	160 lb (73 kg)	So	Victory Rock Prep	Chicago, IL
C	44	Mark Kostelac	6 ft 11 in (2.11 m)	250 lb (113 kg)	Fr	Notre Dame Cathedral Latin	Cleveland, OH
G	12	Marquelle Mcintyre	5 ft 10 in (1.78 m)	175 lb (79 kg)	So	Greensboro Day School	Greensboro, NC
F	22	Emmanuel Plojakpoke	6 ft 8 in (2.03 m)	190 lb (86 kg)	So	Cypress Springs High School	Houston, TX
G	20	Eric Parrish	6 ft 6 in (1.98 m)	195 lb (88 kg)	Fr	Cypress Springs	Cypress, TX
G	24	Torrey Patton	6 ft 4 in (1.93 m)	195 lb (88 kg)	Fr	Trotwood-Madison	Trotwood, OH
C	10	Deng Riak	6 ft 10 in (2.08 m)	225 lb (102 kg)	RS So	Victory Rock Prep	Melbourne, Australia
F	23	Jaden Sayles	6 ft 9 in (2.06 m)	235 lb (107 kg)	Fr	Sycamore	Cincinnati, OH
F	3	Daniel Utomi	6 ft 6 in (1.98 m)	215 lb (98 kg)	RS So	Westside High School	Houston, TX

Head coach

- John Groce (Taylor)

Assistant coach(es)

- Dustin Ford (Ohio)
- Rob Fulford
- Robby Pridgen (Roanoke)

Legend

- (C) Team captain
- (S) Suspended
- (I) Ineligible
- (W) Walk-on
- Injured
- Current redshirt

Roster

== Schedule and results ==
Date time, TV	Rank^{#}	Opponent^{#}	Result	Record	Site (attendance) city, state
Non-conference regular season
Nov 11, 2017*; 7:00 pm, ESPN3		Cleveland State	W 67–57	1–0	James A. Rhodes Arena (4,036); Akron, OH
Nov 18, 2017*; 7:00 pm, ESPN3		UT Martin	W 76–59	2–0	James A. Rhodes Arena (2,713); Akron, OH
Nov 25, 2017*; 7:00 pm, FSOH		at Dayton	L 60–73	2–1	UD Arena (12,872); Dayton, OH
Nov 28, 2017*; 7:00 pm, ESPN3		Chattanooga	W 75–70	3–1	James A. Rhodes Arena (2,495); Akron, OH
Dec 2, 2017*; 7:00 pm		at Marshall	L 64–86	3–2	Cam Henderson Center (5,104); Huntington, WV
Dec 6, 2017*; 7:00 pm, ESPN3		Fort Wayne	W 83–79	4–2	James A. Rhodes Arena (2,340); Akron, OH
Dec 9, 2017*; 2:00 pm, ESPN3		Appalachian State	W 94–89	5–2	James A. Rhodes Arena (2,219); Akron, OH
Dec 16, 2017*; 2:00 pm, ESPN3		Mississippi Valley State	W 81–63	6–2	James A. Rhodes Arena (2,155); Akron, OH
Dec 22, 2017*; 7:30 pm, ESPNU		vs. USC; Diamond Head Classic quarterfinals	L 53-84	6-3	Stan Sheriff Center (7,669); Honolulu, HI
Dec 23, 2017*; 7:00 pm, ESPN3		vs. Princeton; Diamond Head Classic consolation 2nd round	L 62-64	6-4	Stan Sheriff Center (5,811); Honolulu, HI
Dec 25, 2017*; 12:30pm, ESPNU		vs. Davidson; Diamond Head Classic 7th place game	L 78–91	6–5	Stan Sheriff Center (6,698); Honolulu, HI
Dec 29, 2017*; 7:00 pm, ESPN3		Concord	W 86–49	7–5	James A. Rhodes Arena (2,283); Akron, OH
MAC regular season
Jan 2, 2018; 7:00 pm, ESPN3		at Western Michigan	L 75–87	7–6 (0–1)	University Arena (2,110); Kalamazoo, MI
Jan 5, 2018; 6:30 pm, CBSSN		at Toledo	L 65–67	7–7 (0–2)	Savage Arena (4,155); Toledo, OH
Jan 9, 2018; 3:00 pm, ESPN3		Buffalo	L 65–87	7–8 (0–3)	James A. Rhodes Arena (2,924); Akron, OH
Jan 13, 2018; 2:00 pm, ESPN3		Bowling Green	W 80–78	8–8 (1–3)	James A. Rhodes Arena (3,204); Akron, OH
Jan 16, 2018; 7:00 pm, ESPN3		at Eastern Michigan	L 49–63	8–9 (1–4)	Convocation Center (1,254); Ypsilanti, MI
Jan 20, 2018; 2:00 pm, ESPN3		Northern Illinois	W 82–67	9–9 (2–4)	James A. Rhodes Arena (3,378); Akron, OH
Jan 23, 2018; 7:00 pm, ESPN3		Ohio	W 71–68	10–9 (3–4)	James A. Rhodes Arena (2,653); Akron, OH
Jan 27, 2018; 12:00 pm, CBSSN		at Ball State	L 106–111 ^{2OT}	10–10 (3–5)	Worthen Arena (3,867); Muncie, IN
Jan 30, 2018; 7:00 pm, ESPN3		Miami (OH)	L 64–79	10–11 (3–6)	Millett Hall (1,808); Oxford, OH
Feb 3, 2018; 12:00 pm, CBSSN		Toledo	L 56–77	10–12 (3–7)	James A. Rhodes Arena (2,584); Akron, OH
Feb 6, 2018; 7:00 pm, ESPN3		at Ohio	L 75–99	10–13 (3–8)	Convocation Center; Athens, OH
Feb 10, 2018; 2:00 pm, ESPN3		Central Michigan	W 69–63	11–13 (4–8)	James A. Rhodes Arena (2,564); Akron, OH
Feb 13, 2018; 7:00 pm, ESPN3		Ball State	L 77–90	11–14 (4–9)	James A. Rhodes Arena (2,543); Akron, OH
Feb 17, 2018; 2:00 pm, CBSSN		at Kent State	L 68–78	11–15 (4–10)	Memorial Athletic and Convocation Center (6,055); Kent, OH
Feb 20, 2018; 7:00 pm, ESPN3		at Bowling Green	W 81–79	12–15 (5–10)	Stroh Center (1,540); Bowling Green, OH
Feb 24, 2018; 2:00 pm, CBSSN		Miami (OH)	L 62–64 ^{OT}	12–16 (5–11)	James A. Rhodes Arena (2,751); Akron, OH
Feb 27, 2018; 7:00 pm, ESPN3		at Buffalo	L 68–80	12–17 (5–12)	Alumni Arena (3,659); Amherst, NY
Mar 2, 2018; 7:00 pm, ESPN3		Kent State	W 67–65	13–17 (6–12)	James A. Rhodes Arena (4,349); Akron, OH
MAC tournament
Mar 5, 2018; 7:45 pm, ESPN3	(11)	at (6) Western Michigan; First round	W 79–78	14–17	University Arena (897); Kalamazoo, MI
Mar 8, 2018; 9:00 pm, ESPN3	(11)	vs. (3) Eastern Michigan; Quarterfinals	L 58–67	14–18	Quicken Loans Arena (2,605); Cleveland, OH
*Non-conference game. ^{#}Rankings from AP Poll. (#) Tournament seedings in parentheses. All times are in Eastern Time.
