= 2018 MAC men's basketball tournament =

- Classification: Division I
- Season: 2017–18
- Teams: 12
- Site: Quicken Loans Arena; Cleveland, Ohio
- First round site: Campus sites
- Champions: Buffalo (3rd title)
- Winning coach: Nate Oats (2nd title)
- MVP: Wes Clark (Buffalo)
- Television: CBSSN, ESPN2
- MAC men's basketball tournaments

2017–18 Mid-American Conference men's basketball standings
| | Conf. | | | | Overall |
| Team | W | | L | PCT | W | | L | PCT |
|---|---|---|---|---|---|---|---|---|
East
| Buffalo † | 15 | – | 3 | .833 | 27 | – | 9 | .750 |
| Kent State | 9 | – | 9 | .500 | 17 | – | 17 | .500 |
| Miami (OH) | 8 | – | 10 | .444 | 16 | – | 18 | .471 |
| Bowling Green | 7 | – | 11 | .389 | 16 | – | 16 | .500 |
| Ohio | 7 | – | 11 | .389 | 14 | – | 17 | .452 |
| Akron | 6 | – | 12 | .333 | 14 | – | 18 | .438 |
West
| Toledo | 13 | – | 5 | .722 | 23 | – | 11 | .676 |
| Eastern Michigan | 11 | – | 7 | .611 | 22 | – | 13 | .629 |
| Ball State | 10 | – | 8 | .556 | 19 | – | 13 | .594 |
| Western Michigan | 9 | – | 9 | .500 | 17 | – | 15 | .531 |
| Central Michigan | 7 | – | 11 | .389 | 21 | – | 15 | .583 |
| Northern Illinois | 6 | – | 12 | .333 | 13 | – | 19 | .406 |
† 2018 MAC tournament winner

The 2018 Mid-American Conference men's basketball tournament was the post-season men's basketball tournament for the Mid-American Conference (MAC). Tournament first-round games were held on campus sites at the higher seed on March 5. The remaining rounds were held at Quicken Loans Arena in Cleveland, Ohio between March 8–10, 2018. Regular-season champion Buffalo defeated Toledo in the championship game to win the tournament and receive the conference's automatic bid to the NCAA tournament. There they defeated Arizona before losing to Kentucky.

== Seeds ==
All 12 MAC teams participated in the tournament. Teams were seeded by record within the conference, with a tiebreaker system to seed teams with identical conference records. The top four teams will receive a bye to quarterfinals.

| Seed | School | Conference record | Division | Tiebreaker |
|---|---|---|---|---|
| 1 | Buffalo | 15–3 | East | |
| 2 | Toledo | 13–5 | West | |
| 3 | Eastern Michigan | 11–7 | West | |
| 4 | Ball State | 10–8 | West | |
| 5 | Kent State | 9–9 | East | 1–0 vs. WMU |
| 6 | Western Michigan | 9–9 | West | 0–1 vs. KSU |
| 7 | Miami (OH) | 8–10 | East | |
| 8 | Central Michigan | 7–11 | West | 3–0 vs. tied teams (2–0 vs. Ohio, 1–0 vs. BGSU) |
| 9 | Bowling Green | 7–11 | East | 1–2 vs. tied teams (1–1 vs. Ohio, 0–1 vs. CMU) |
| 10 | Ohio | 7–11 | East | 1–3 vs. tied teams (1–1 vs. BGSU, 0–2 vs. CMU) |
| 11 | Akron | 6–12 | East | 1–0 vs. NIU |
| 12 | Northern Illinois | 6–12 | West | 0–1 vs. Akron |

== Schedule ==
| Game | Time | Matchup | Score | Television |
First round – Monday March 5 – Campus sites
| 1 | 7:00 pm | No. 9 Bowling Green at No. 8 Central Michigan | 77–81^{OT} | ESPN3 |
| 2 | 7:00 pm | No. 12 Northern Illinois at No. 5 Kent State | 59–61 | ESPN3 |
| 3 | 7:00 pm | No. 10 Ohio at No. 7 Miami (OH) | 55–68 | ESPN3 |
| 4 | 7:45 pm | No. 11 Akron at No. 6 Western Michigan | 79–78 | ESPN3 |
Quarterfinals – Thursday March 8 – Quicken Loans Arena, Cleveland, OH
| 5 | 12:00 pm | No. 8 Central Michigan vs. No. 1 Buffalo | 74–89 | BCSN; ESPN3 |
| 6 | 2:30 pm | No. 5 Kent State vs. No. 4 Ball State | 76–73 | BCSN; ESPN3 |
| 7 | 6:30 pm | No. 7 Miami (OH) vs. No. 2 Toledo | 69–71 | BCSN; ESPN3 |
| 8 | 9:00 pm | No. 11 Akron vs. No. 3 Eastern Michigan | 58–67 | BCSN; ESPN3 |
Semifinals – Friday March 9 – Quicken Loans Arena, Cleveland, OH
| 9 | 6:30 pm | No. 5 Kent State vs. No. 1 Buffalo | 61–78 | CBSSN |
| 10 | 9:00 pm | No. 3 Eastern Michigan vs. No. 2 Toledo | 63–64 | CBSSN |
Championship – Saturday March 10 – Quicken Loans Arena, Cleveland, OH
| 11 | 7:00 pm | No. 2 Toledo vs. No. 1 Buffalo | 66–76 | ESPN2 |
Game times in ET. Rankings denote tournament seed

== Bracket ==
First round Monday, March 5
8 | Central Michigan | 81*
9 | Bowling Green | 77
5 | Kent State | 61
12 | Northern Illinois | 59
7 | Miami (OH) | 68
10 | Ohio | 55
6 | Western Michigan | 78
11 | Akron | 79

Quarterfinals; Thursday, March 8
1 | Buffalo | 89
8 | Central Michigan | 74
4 | Ball State | 73
5 | Kent State | 76
2 | Toledo | 71
7 | Miami (OH) | 69
3 | Eastern Michigan | 67
11 | Akron | 58

Semifinals; Friday, March 9
1 | Buffalo | 78
5 | Kent State | 61
2 | Toledo | 64
3 | Eastern Michigan | 63

Championship; Saturday, March 10
1 | Buffalo | 76
2 | Toledo | 66

* denotes overtime period

== All-Tournament Team ==
Tournament MVP – Wes Clark, Buffalo

| Player | Team |
|---|---|
| Marreon Jackson | Toledo |
| Jaelan Sanford | Toledo |
| Jeremy Harris | Buffalo |
| Wes Clark | Buffalo |
| Paul Jackson | Eastern Michigan |
