= 2017–18 Northern Illinois Huskies men's basketball team =

American college basketball season

2017–18 Northern Illinois Huskies men's basketball
- Conference: Mid-American Conference
- West Division
- Record: 13–19 (6–12 MAC)
- Head coach: Mark Montgomery (7th season)
- Associate head coach: Jon Borovich
- Assistant coaches: Lamar Chapman; Brandon Watkins
- Home arena: Convocation Center

2017–18 Mid-American Conference men's basketball standings
	Conf.				Overall
Team	W		L	PCT	W		L	PCT
East
Buffalo †	15	–	3	.833	27	–	9	.750
Kent State	9	–	9	.500	17	–	17	.500
Miami (OH)	8	–	10	.444	16	–	18	.471
Bowling Green	7	–	11	.389	16	–	16	.500
Ohio	7	–	11	.389	14	–	17	.452
Akron	6	–	12	.333	14	–	18	.438
West
Toledo	13	–	5	.722	23	–	11	.676
Eastern Michigan	11	–	7	.611	22	–	13	.629
Ball State	10	–	8	.556	19	–	13	.594
Western Michigan	9	–	9	.500	17	–	15	.531
Central Michigan	7	–	11	.389	21	–	15	.583
Northern Illinois	6	–	12	.333	13	–	19	.406
† 2018 MAC tournament winner

The 2017–18 Northern Illinois Huskies men's basketball team represented Northern Illinois University during the 2017–18 NCAA Division I men's basketball season. The Huskies, led by seventh-year head coach Mark Montgomery, played their home games at the Convocation Center in DeKalb, Illinois as members of the West Division of the Mid-American Conference (MAC). They finished the season 13–19, 6–12 in MAC play, to finish in last place in the West Division. They lost in the first round of the MAC tournament to Kent State.

== Previous season ==
The Huskies finished the 2016–17 season 15–17, 7–11 in MAC play, to finish in a tie for fourth place in the West Division. As the No. 9 seed in the MAC tournament, they lost in the first round to Eastern Michigan.

== Offseason ==
=== Coaching changes ===
Following the season, assistant coach Lou Dawkins left the school to take an assistant coach position at Cleveland State. Assistant coach Jason Larson was not retained by the school following the season.

On April 28, 2017, the school hired Lamar Chapman as an assistant coach. On October 12, Brandon Watkins was hired as an assistant to round out the coaching staff.

=== Departures ===
Name	Number	Pos.	Height	Weight	Year	Hometown	Notes
Dontel Highsmith	34	G	6' 2"	200	Senior	Dowagiac, MI	Graduated and transferred to Cleveland State
Marin Maric	34	C	6' 11"	250	Senior	Split, Croatia	Graduated and transferred to DePaul
Laytwan Porter	14	G	6' 2"	165	Sophomore	Rockford, IL	Transferred
Nick Wagner	14	G	6' 3"	190	Freshman	Galesville, WI	Transferred
Marshawn Wilson	14	G	6' 3"	205	Sophomore	Oakdale, MN	Left school during season

=== 2017 recruiting class ===
College recruiting information
Name	Hometown	School	Height	Weight	Commit date
Safir 'Gairges' Daow; SG	Australia	Victory Rock Prep School	6 ft 5 in (1.96 m)	N/A	
Safir 'Gairges' Daow; SG	Recruit ratings: Scout: Rivals: (NR)				
Eugene 'Marlo' Brown; SF	Detroit, MI	DME Academy	6 ft 5 in (1.96 m)	170 lb (77 kg)	
Eugene 'Marlo' Brown; SF	Recruit ratings: Scout: Rivals: (NR)				
Owen Hamilton #37 C	Prescott, WI	Prescott High School	6 ft 11 in (2.11 m)	245 lb (111 kg)	Sep 18, 2016
Owen Hamilton #37 C	Recruit ratings: Scout: Rivals: (NR)				
Rod Henry-Hayes; SG	Zion, IL	Zion-Benton Township High School	6 ft 4 in (1.93 m)	175 lb (79 kg)	
Rod Henry-Hayes; SG	Recruit ratings: Scout: Rivals: (NR)				
Overall recruit ranking:
Note: In many cases, Scout, Rivals, 247Sports, On3, and ESPN may conflict in their listings of height and weight.; In these cases, the average was taken. ESPN grades are on a 100-point scale.; Sources: "2017 Team Ranking". Rivals.

== Schedule and results ==
Date time, TV	Rank^{#}	Opponent^{#}	Result	Record	Site (attendance) city, state
Non-conference regular season
November 10, 2017*; 7:00 p.m.		St. Francis (IL); Postponed (unsafe court conditions), make-up November 16			Convocation Center; DeKalb, IL
November 14, 2017*; 7:00 p.m., ESPN3		Green Bay	W 85–65	1–0	Convocation Center (858); DeKalb, IL
November 16, 2017*; 7:00 p.m.		St. Francis (IL)	W 70–60	2–0	Convocation Center (514); DeKalb, IL
November 20, 2017*; 4:00 p.m., Flohoops.com		vs. Penn; Gulf Coast Showcase quarterfinals	L 80–93	2–1	Germain Arena (823); Estero, FL
November 21, 2017*; 12:30 p.m., Flohoops.com		vs. Florida Atlantic; Gulf Coast Showcase consolation round	L 67–77	2–2	Germain Arena (841); Estero, FL
November 22, 2017*; 10:00 a.m., Flohoops.com		vs. Manhattan; Gulf Coast Showcase 7th-place game	W 70–68	3–2	Germain Arena (868); Estero, FL
November 26, 2017*; 3:30 p.m.		Rockford	W 105–53	4–2	Convocation Center (649); DeKalb, IL
November 29, 2017*; 8:30 p.m., ESPN3		Milwaukee	L 62–75	4–3	Convocation Center (1,216); DeKalb, IL
December 2, 2017*; 2:05 p.m., WAC Digital Network		at Chicago State	W 95–77	5–3	Jones Convocation Center (463); Chicago, IL
December 4, 2017*; 8:00 p.m., ESPNU		at Iowa State	L 80–94	5–4	Hilton Coliseum (13,894); Ames, IA
December 9, 2017*; 12:00 p.m., ESPN3		Central Connecticut	W 61–55	6–4	Convocation Center (641); DeKalb, IL
December 18, 2017*; 6:00 p.m., FS1		at Marquette	L 70–79	6–5	BMO Harris Bradley Center (12,532); Milwaukee, WI
December 21, 2017*; 7:00 p.m., ESPN3		UIC	W 69–63	7–5	Convocation Center (889); Dekalb, IL
December 29, 2017*; 7:00 p.m., BTN Plus		at Iowa	L 75–98	7–6	Carver–Hawkeye Arena (14,665); Iowa City, IA
MAC regular season
January 2, 2018; 7:00 p.m., ESPN3		Kent State	W 75–61	8–6 (1–0)	Convocation Center (918); DeKalb, IL
January 6, 2018; 2:30 p.m., ESPN3		at Ohio	L 68–78	8–7 (1–1)	Convocation Center (7,066); Athens, OH
January 9, 2018; 6:00 p.m., ESPN3		at Bowling Green	L 57–66	8–8 (1–2)	Stroh Center (2,013); Bowling Green, OH
January 13, 2018; 3:30 p.m., ESPN3		Eastern Michigan	W 72–66	9–8 (2–2)	Convocation Center (1,144); DeKalb, IL
January 16, 2018; 6:00 p.m., ESPN3		at Buffalo	L 67–95	9–9 (2–3)	Alumni Arena (2,098); Amherst, NY
January 20, 2018; 1:00 p.m., ESPN3		at Akron	L 67–82	9–10 (2–4)	James A. Rhodes Arena (3,378); Akron, OH
January 23, 2018; 7:00 p.m., ESPN3		at Bowling Green	W 93–62	10–10 (3–4)	Convocation Center (883); DeKalb, IL
January 27, 2018; 6:00 p.m., ESPN3		at Western Michigan	L 72–79	10–11 (3–5)	University Arena (3,116); Kalamazoo, MI
January 30, 2018; 6:00 p.m., ESPN3		at Central Michigan	L 67–81	10–12 (3–6)	McGuirk Arena (1,820); Mount Pleasant, MI
February 3, 2018; 3:30 p.m., ESPN3		Miami (OH)	L 65–81	10–13 (3–7)	Convocation Center (1,280); DeKalb, IL
February 6, 2018; 6:00 p.m., ESPN3		at Toledo	L 77–82	10–14 (3–8)	Savage Arena (3,861); Toledo, OH
February 10, 2018; 3:30 p.m., ESPN3		Buffalo	W 90–88 ^{OT}	11–14 (4–8)	Convocation Center (1,565); DeKalb, IL
February 13, 2018; 7:00 p.m., ESPN3		Central Michigan	L 72–80	11–15 (4–9)	Convocation Center (799); DeKalb, IL
February 17, 2018; 3:30 p.m., ESPN3		Western Michigan	W 75–67	12–15 (5–9)	Convocation Center (1,743); DeKalb, IL
February 20, 2018; 6:00 p.m., ESPN3		at Ball State	L 68–77	12–16 (5–10)	Worthen Arena (3,745); Muncie, IN
February 24, 2018; 11:00 a.m., ESPN3		at Eastern Michigan	L 53–82	12–17 (5–11)	Convocation Center (1,821); Ypsilanti, MI
February 27, 2018; 7:00 p.m., ESPN3		Toledo	L 67–97	12–18 (5–12)	Convocation Center (869); DeKalb, IL
March 2, 2018; 7:00 p.m., ESPN3		Ball State	W 66–65	13–18 (6–12)	Convocation Center (1,007); DeKalb, IL
MAC tournament
March 5, 2018; 7:00 p.m., ESPN3	(12)	at (5) Kent State; First round	L 59–61	13–19	MAC Center (2,024); Kent, OH
*Non-conference game. ^{#}Rankings from AP poll. (#) Tournament seedings in parentheses. All times are in Central.
