= 2017–18 Mid-American Conference men's basketball season =

- League: NCAA Division I
- Sport: Basketball
- Teams: 12

Regular season
- League champions: Buffalo
- Runners-up: Toledo
- Season MVP: Tre’Shaun Fletcher

Tournament
- Champions: Buffalo
- Runners-up: Toledo
- Finals MVP: Wes Clark

Mid-American men's basketball seasons
- ← 2016–17 2018–19 →

2017–18 Mid-American Conference men's basketball standings
	Conf.				Overall
Team	W		L	PCT	W		L	PCT
East
Buffalo †	15	–	3	.833	27	–	9	.750
Kent State	9	–	9	.500	17	–	17	.500
Miami (OH)	8	–	10	.444	16	–	18	.471
Bowling Green	7	–	11	.389	16	–	16	.500
Ohio	7	–	11	.389	14	–	17	.452
Akron	6	–	12	.333	14	–	18	.438
West
Toledo	13	–	5	.722	23	–	11	.676
Eastern Michigan	11	–	7	.611	22	–	13	.629
Ball State	10	–	8	.556	19	–	13	.594
Western Michigan	9	–	9	.500	17	–	15	.531
Central Michigan	7	–	11	.389	21	–	15	.583
Northern Illinois	6	–	12	.333	13	–	19	.406
† 2018 MAC tournament winner

The 2017–18 Mid-American Conference men's basketball season began with practices in October 2017, followed by the start of the 2017–18 NCAA Division I men's basketball season in November. Conference play began in January 2018 and concluded in March 2018. Buffalo won the regular season title with a conference record of 15-3. Buffalo also won the MAC tournament and represented the MAC in the NCAA tournament where they defeated No. 4-seeded Arizona in the first round before falling to Kentucky in the second round.

== Preseason awards ==
The preseason poll and league awards were announced by the league office on October 26, 2017.

=== Preseason men's basketball poll ===
(First place votes in parentheses)

==== East Division ====
1. Buffalo 166 (24)
2. Kent State 139 (2)
3. Ohio 127 (3)
4. Akron 84 (1)
5. Bowling Green 82
6. Miami 32

==== West Division ====
1. Western Michigan 169 (22)
2. Ball State 156 (8)
3. Toledo 107
4. Eastern Michigan 103
5. Northern Illinois 57
6. Central Michigan 38

==== Tournament champs ====
Western Michigan (10), Buffalo (9), Ball State (5), Kent State (2), Toledo (2), Bowling Green (1), Miami (1)

=== Honors ===
Honor	Recipient
Preseason All-MAC East	C.J. Massinburg, Buffalo, Jr., Guard
Preseason All-MAC East	Nick Perkins, Buffalo, Jr., Forward
Preseason All-MAC East	Jaylin Walker, Kent State, Jr., Guard
Preseason All-MAC East	Jordan Dartis, Ohio, Jr., Guard
Preseason All-MAC East	Jason Carter, Ohio, So., Forward
Preseason All-MAC West	James Thompson IV, Eastern Michigan, Jr., Forward/Center
Preseason All-MAC West	Thomas Wilder, Western Michigan, Sr., Guard
Preseason All-MAC West	Tayler Persons, Ball State, Jr., Guard
Preseason All-MAC West	Jaelan Sanford, Toledo, Jr., Guard
Preseason All-MAC West	Eugene German, Northern Illinois, So., Guard

== Postseason ==
=== Postseason awards ===
1. Coach of the Year: Nate Oats, Buffalo
2. Player of the Year: Tre’Shaun Fletcher, Toledo
3. Freshman of the Year: Nike Sibande, Miami
4. Defensive Player of the Year: Tim Bond, Eastern Michigan
5. Sixth Man of the Year: Nick Perkins, Buffalo

=== Honors ===
Honor	Recipient
Postseason All-MAC First Team	Tre’Shaun Fletcher, Sr., G, Toledo
Postseason All-MAC First Team	C.J. Massinburg, Jr., G, Buffalo
Postseason All-MAC First Team	Nick Perkins, Jr., F, Buffalo
Postseason All-MAC First Team	James Thompson IV, Jr., F/C, Eastern Michigan
Postseason All-MAC First Team	Thomas Wilder, Sr., G, Western Michigan
Postseason All-MAC Second Team	Eugene German, So., G, Northern Illinois
Postseason All-MAC Second Team	Jeremy Harris, Jr., G, Buffalo
Postseason All-MAC Second Team	Tayler Persons, Jr., G, Ball State
Postseason All-MAC Second Team	Jaelan Sanford, Jr., G, Toledo
Postseason All-MAC Second Team	Demajeo Wiggins, Jr., F, Bowling Green
Postseason All-MAC Third Team	Wes Clark, Sr., G, Buffalo
Postseason All-MAC Third Team	Elijah Minnie, R-Jr., F, Eastern Michigan
Postseason All-MAC Third Team	Trey Moses, Jr., C, Ball State
Postseason All-MAC Third Team	Darrian Ringo, Jr., G, Miami
Postseason All-MAC Third Team	Jaylin Walker, Jr., G, Kent State
Postseason All-MAC Honorable Mention	Jordan Dartis, Jr., G, Ohio
Postseason All-MAC Honorable Mention	Daniel Utomi, So., F, Akron
Postseason All-MAC Honorable Mention	Justin Turner, R-Fr., G, Bowling Green
Postseason All-MAC Honorable Mention	Nike Sibande, Fr., G, Miami
Postseason All-MAC Honorable Mention	Paul Jackson, R-Jr., G, Eastern Michigan
All-MAC Freshman Team	Dalonte Brown, Fr., F, Miami
All-MAC Freshman Team	Marreon Jackson, Fr., G, Toledo
All-MAC Freshman Team	Teyvion Kirk, Fr., G, Ohio
All-MAC Freshman Team	Nike Sibande, Fr., G, Miami
All-MAC Freshman Team	Justin Turner, R-Fr., G, Bowling Green
All-MAC Defensive Team	Tim Bond, Sr., G, Eastern Michigan
All-MAC Defensive Team	Davonta Jordan, So., G, Buffalo
All-MAC Defensive Team	Bryce Moore, Jr., G, Western Michigan
All-MAC Defensive Team	Darrian Ringo, Jr., G, Miami
All-MAC Defensive Team	James Thompson IV, Jr., F/C, Eastern Michigan

== See also ==
2017–18 Mid-American Conference women's basketball season
