= 2017–18 Western Michigan Broncos men's basketball team =

American college basketball season

2017–18 Western Michigan Broncos men's basketball
- Conference: Mid-American Conference
- West Division
- Record: 17–15 (9–9 MAC)
- Head coach: Steve Hawkins (15th season)
- Assistant coaches: Clayton Bates; Larry Farmer; James Holland
- Home arena: University Arena

2017–18 Mid-American Conference men's basketball standings
	Conf.				Overall
Team	W		L	PCT	W		L	PCT
East
Buffalo †	15	–	3	.833	27	–	9	.750
Kent State	9	–	9	.500	17	–	17	.500
Miami (OH)	8	–	10	.444	16	–	18	.471
Bowling Green	7	–	11	.389	16	–	16	.500
Ohio	7	–	11	.389	14	–	17	.452
Akron	6	–	12	.333	14	–	18	.438
West
Toledo	13	–	5	.722	23	–	11	.676
Eastern Michigan	11	–	7	.611	22	–	13	.629
Ball State	10	–	8	.556	19	–	13	.594
Western Michigan	9	–	9	.500	17	–	15	.531
Central Michigan	7	–	11	.389	21	–	15	.583
Northern Illinois	6	–	12	.333	13	–	19	.406
† 2018 MAC tournament winner

The 2017–18 Western Michigan Broncos men's basketball team represented Western Michigan University during the 2017–18 NCAA Division I men's basketball season. The Broncos, led by 15th-year head coach Steve Hawkins, played their home games at University Arena as members of the West Division of the Mid-American Conference. They finished the season 17–15, 9–9 in MAC play to finish fourth in the West Division. As the No. 8 seed in the MAC tournament, they lost in the first round of the conference tournament to Akron.

== Previous season ==
The Broncos finished the 2016–17 season 16–16, 11–7 in MAC play to tie for first in the West Division. As the No. 5 seed in the MAC tournament, they lost in the quarterfinals of the conference tournament to Ball State. They declined invitations from both the CollegeInsider.com and College Basketball Invitational postseason tournaments.

== Offseason ==
=== Recruiting class of 2017 ===
College recruiting information
Name	Hometown	School	Height	Weight	Commit date
T. J. Clifford; PF	Downers Grove, IL	Downers Grove South High School	6 ft 6 in (1.98 m)	N/A	Jul 9, 2016
T. J. Clifford; PF	Recruit ratings: Scout: Rivals: (NR)				
Michael Flowers; PG	Southfield, MI	Southfield High School	6 ft 2 in (1.88 m)	N/A	
Michael Flowers; PG	Recruit ratings: Scout: Rivals: (NR)				
Overall recruit ranking:
Note: In many cases, Scout, Rivals, 247Sports, On3, and ESPN may conflict in their listings of height and weight.; In these cases, the average was taken. ESPN grades are on a 100-point scale.; Sources: "2017 Western Michigan Basketball Commits". Rivals.; "2016 Western Michigan Basketball Commits". Scout.; "2016 Western Michigan Basketball Commits". ESPN.; "Scout.com Team Recruiting Rankings". Scout.; "2017 Team Ranking". Rivals.

== Roster ==
2017–18 Western Michigan Broncos men's basketball team
Players
Coaches

Pos.	#	Name	Height	Weight	Year	Previous school	Hometown
G	0	Bryce Moore	6 ft 2 in (1.88 m)	195 lb (88 kg)	Jr	Park Tudor	Indianapolis, IN
G	1	Michael Flowers	6 ft 2 in (1.88 m)	190 lb (86 kg)	Fr	Southfield A&T	Southfield, MI
G	2	Kyle McDermed (W)	6 ft 2 in (1.88 m)	175 lb (79 kg)	Fr	Don Bosco Prep	Frankfort, IL
G/F	3	Josh Davis	6 ft 5 in (1.96 m)	190 lb (86 kg)	Jr	Henry J. Ford	Detroit, MI
G	4	Jared Printy	6 ft 4 in (1.93 m)	185 lb (84 kg)	So	Linn-Mar	Cedar Rapids, IA
G	10	Thomas Wilder	6 ft 3 in (1.91 m)	190 lb (86 kg)	Sr	Quakerdale Prep	Montgomery, IL
G	12	Jarrin Randall	5 ft 11 in (1.8 m)	165 lb (75 kg)	So	Morgan Park	Chicago, IL
G/F	23	Reggie Jones	6 ft 6 in (1.98 m)	215 lb (98 kg)	So	Marion	Marion, IN
F	24	Adida Ikongshul	6 ft 6 in (1.98 m)	195 lb (88 kg)	So	Madison Consolidated	Nigeria
G	30	Jason Whitens	6 ft 5 in (1.96 m)	195 lb (88 kg)	Fr	Powers North Central	Powers, MI
F	32	TJ Clifford	6 ft 5 in (1.96 m)	220 lb (100 kg)	Fr	Downers Grove South	Downers Grove, IL
F	35	Brandon Johnson	6 ft 8 in (2.03 m)	225 lb (102 kg)	So	Thea Bowman Leadership Academy	Chicago, IL
C	42	Drake LaMont	6 ft 10 in (2.08 m)	250 lb (113 kg)	Sr	American Heritage	Plantation, FL
C	50	Seth Dugan	7 ft 0 in (2.13 m)	245 lb (111 kg)	Jr	Otsego	Otsego, MI

Head coach

- Steve Hawkins (South Alabama)

Assistant coach(es)

- Clayton Bates (Florida)
- Larry Farmer (UCLA)
- James Holland (USC Upstate)

Legend

- (C) Team captain
- (S) Suspended
- (I) Ineligible
- (W) Walk-on
- Injured
- Current redshirt

Roster

== Schedule and results ==
Date time, TV	Rank^{#}	Opponent^{#}	Result	Record	Site (attendance) city, state
Exhibition
October 29, 2017*; 2:00 pm		Lourdes	W 106–51		University Arena (1,375); Kalamazoo, MI
November 4, 2017*; 2:00 pm		Kalamazoo	W 87–62		University Arena (1,503); Kalamazoo, MI
Non-conference regular season
November 11, 2017*; 2:00 pm, ESPN3		Siena Heights	W 103–72	1–0	University Arena (1,871); Kalamazoo, MI
November 13, 2017*; 8:00 pm, SECN		at South Carolina; Puerto Rico Tip-Off non-bracket game	W 78–60	1–1	Colonial Life Arena (12,136); Columbia, SC
November 16, 2017*; 8:00 pm, ESPNews		vs. Tulsa; Puerto Rico Tip-Off quarterfinals	W 81–74	1–2	HTC Center (704); Conway, SC
November 17, 2017*; 5:00 pm, ESPNU		vs. Appalachian State; Puerto Rico Tip-Off consolation 2nd round	W 86–67	2–2	HTC Center (1,827); Conway, SC
November 19, 2017*; 2:00 pm, ESPNU		vs. South Carolina; Puerto Rico Tip-Off 5th place game	W 79–66	2–3	HTC Center (1,774); Conway, SC
November 25, 2017*; 2:00 pm, ESPN3		Northwood	W 88–59	3–3	University Arena (1,879); Kalamazoo, MI
November 28, 2017*; 8:00 pm, FSMW		at Saint Louis	W 65–51	4–3	Chaifetz Arena (5,081); St. Louis, MO
December 2, 2017*; 8:00 pm, ESPN3		Oakland	W 78–73	4–4	University Arena (2,418); Kalamazoo, MI
December 6, 2017*; 7:00 pm, ESPN3		Cleveland State	W 78–67	5–4	University Arena (1,923); Kalamazoo, MI
December 9, 2017*; 2:00 pm, ESPN3		at Detroit	W 87–79	6–4	Calihan Hall (1,307); Detroit, MI
December 18, 2017*; 7:00 pm, ESPN3		Idaho	W 83–52	6–5	University Arena (1,645); Kalamazoo, MI
December 22, 2017*; 8:00 pm, ESPN3		at Milwaukee	W 66–63	7–5	UW–Milwaukee Panther Arena (1,115); Milwaukee, WI
December 30, 2017*; 8:00 pm, ESPN3		Chicago State	W 92–71	8–5	University Arena (2,364); Kalamazoo, MI
MAC regular season
January 2, 2018; 7:00 pm, ESPN3		Akron	W 87–75	9–5 (1–0)	University Arena (2,110); Kalamazoo, MI
January 6, 2018; 3:30 pm, ESPN3		at Miami (OH)	W 67–62	10–5 (2–0)	Millett Hall (3,809); Oxford, OH
January 9, 2018; 7:00 pm, ESPN3		at Toledo	W 84–61	10–6 (2–1)	Savage Arena (3,594); Toledo, OH
January 13, 2018; 4:30 pm, ESPN3		Ball State	W 73–58	11–6 (3–1)	University Arena (2,733); Kalamazoo, MI
January 16, 2018; 7:00 pm, ESPN3		at Kent State	W 73–71	11–7 (3–2)	MAC Center (2,585); Kent, OH
January 19, 2018; 7:00 pm, ESPNU		Buffalo	W 84–74	11–8 (3–3)	University Arena (2,548); Kalamazoo, MI
January 23, 2018; 7:00 pm, ESPN3		Toledo	W 85–81	11–9 (3–4)	University Arena (2,014); Kalamazoo, MI
January 27, 2018; 2:00 pm, ESPN3		Northern Illinois	W 79–72	12–9 (4–4)	University Arena (3,116); Kalamazoo, MI
January 30, 2018; 7:00 pm, ESPN3		at Eastern Michigan; Michigan MAC Trophy	W 71–57	13–9 (5–4)	Convocation Center (2,422); Ypsilanti, MI
February 2, 2018; 7:00 pm, CBSSN		at Buffalo	W 92–86	13–10 (5–5)	Alumni Arena (6,670); Amherst, NY
February 6, 2018; 7:00 pm, ESPN3		at Miami (OH)	W 68–64	14–10 (6–5)	University Arena (1,878); Kalamazoo, MI
February 10, 2018; 4:30 pm, ESPN3		at Ohio	W 69–60	15–10 (7–5)	University Arena (2,707); Kalamazoo, MI
February 13, 2018; 7:00 pm, ESPN3		at Bowling Green	W 83–81	15–11 (7–6)	Stroh Center (1,421); Bowling Green, OH
February 17, 2018; 4:30 pm, ESPN3		at Northern Illinois	L 67–75	15–12 (7–7)	Convocation Center (1,743); DeKalb, IL
February 20, 2018; 7:00 pm, ESPN3		Central Michigan; Michigan MAC Trophy	W 83–81 ^{OT}	16–12 (8–7)	University Arena (2,895); Kalamazoo, MI
February 23, 2018; 7:00 pm, ESPN2		at Ball State	W 87–80	17–12 (9–7)	Worthen Arena (5,924); Muncie, IN
February 27, 2018; 7:00 pm, ESPN3		Eastern Michigan; Michigan MAC Trophy	L 58–74	17–13 (9–8)	University Arena (2,610); Kalamazoo, MI
March 3, 2018; 11:00 am		vs. Central Michigan; Michigan MAC Trophy	W 84–71	17–14 (9–9)	Riepma Arena (150); Midland, MI
MAC tournament
March 5, 2018; 7:45 pm, ESPN3	(6)	(11) Akron; First round	W 79–78	17–15	University Arena (897); Kalamazoo, MI
*Non-conference game. ^{#}Rankings from AP Poll. (#) Tournament seedings in parentheses. All times are in Eastern Time Zone.

== See also ==
- 2017–18 Western Michigan Broncos women's basketball team
