= 2017–18 Dayton Flyers men's basketball team =

American college basketball season

2017–18 Dayton Flyers men's basketball
- Conference: Atlantic 10 Conference
- Record: 14–17 (8–10 A-10)
- Head coach: Anthony Grant (1st season)
- Associate head coach: Anthony Solomon
- Assistant coaches: James Kane; Ricardo Greer
- Home arena: UD Arena

2017–18 Atlantic 10 men's basketball standings
	Conf.				Overall
Team	W		L	PCT	W		L	PCT
Rhode Island	15	–	3	.833	26	–	8	.765
St. Bonaventure	14	–	4	.778	26	–	8	.765
Davidson †	13	–	5	.722	21	–	12	.636
Saint Joseph's	10	–	8	.556	16	–	16	.500
VCU	9	–	9	.500	18	–	15	.545
Saint Louis	9	–	9	.500	17	–	16	.515
George Mason	9	–	9	.500	16	–	17	.485
Richmond	9	–	9	.500	12	–	20	.375
Dayton	8	–	10	.444	14	–	17	.452
Duquesne	7	–	11	.389	16	–	16	.500
George Washington	7	–	11	.389	15	–	18	.455
La Salle	7	–	11	.389	13	–	19	.406
Massachusetts	5	–	13	.278	13	–	20	.394
Fordham	4	–	14	.222	9	–	22	.290
† 2018 A10 Tournament winner Rankings from AP poll

The 2017–18 Dayton Flyers men's basketball team represented the University of Dayton during the 2017–18 NCAA Division I men's basketball season. The Flyers were led by first-year head coach Anthony Grant and played their home games at the University of Dayton Arena as members of the Atlantic 10 Conference. They finished the season 14–17, 8–10 in A-10 play to finish in ninth place. They lost in the second round of the A-10 tournament to VCU.

== Previous season ==
The Flyers finished the 2016–17 season 24–8, 15–3 in A-10 play to win the regular season A-10 championship. They received the No. 1 seed in the A-10 tournament where they lost in the quarterfinals to Davidson. They received an at-large bid to the NCAA tournament as the #7 seed in the South Region, where they lost in the first round to #10 Wichita State.

On March 25, 2017, head coach Archie Miller left the school to accept the head coaching position at Indiana. The school hired Dayton alum Anthony Grant as the new head coach on March 30.

== Offseason ==
=== Departures ===
Name	Number	Pos.	Height	Weight	Year	Hometown	Notes
Sam Miller	2	F	6'9"	238	Sophomore	Washington, D.C.	Suspended from the team
Kyle Davis	3	G	6'0"	175	Senior	Chicago, IL	Graduated
Charles Cooke	4	G	6'5"	196	RS Senior	Trenton, NJ	Graduated/Went undrafted in 2017 NBA draft
Jack Parsley	10	F	6'5"	225	Junior	Granville, OH	Walk-on; didn't return
Scoochie Smith	11	G	6'2"	185	Senior	New York, NY	Graduated
Jeremiah Bonsu	14	G	5'11"	162	Senior	Pickerington, OH	Walk-on; graduated
Adam Goines	24	G	6'3"	193	Freshman	Cincinnati, OH	Walk-on; didn't return
Kendall Pollard	25	F	6'6"	230	Senior	Chicago, IL	Graduated
Ben Agnieszka	51	G	6'3"	196	Freshman	Brecksville, OH	Walk-on; didn't return

=== Recruiting class of 2017 ===
College recruiting information
Name	Hometown	School	Height	Weight	Commit date
Jordan Pierce #52 C	Scotch Plains, NJ	Union Catholic Regional High School	6 ft 10 in (2.08 m)	275 lb (125 kg)	Sep 4, 2016
Jordan Pierce #52 C	Recruit ratings: Scout: Rivals: (71)				
Jordan Davis; SG	Irmo, SC	Dutch Fork High School	6 ft 4 in (1.93 m)	180 lb (82 kg)	Aug 27, 2017
Jordan Davis; SG	Recruit ratings: Scout: Rivals: (NR)				
Jalen Crutcher; PG	Memphis, TN	Ridgeway High School	6 ft 3 in (1.91 m)	170 lb (77 kg)	Sep 4, 2016
Jalen Crutcher; PG	Recruit ratings: Scout: Rivals: (NR)				
Matej Svoboda; SF	Ostrava, Czech Republic	CEZ Basketball Nymburk	6 ft 7 in (2.01 m)	205 lb (93 kg)	Feb 5, 2017
Matej Svoboda; SF	Recruit ratings: Scout: Rivals: (NR)				
Obi Toppin; PF	Baltimore, MD	Mt. Zion Prep	6 ft 9 in (2.06 m)	200 lb (91 kg)	May 16, 2017
Obi Toppin; PF	Recruit ratings: Scout: Rivals: (NR)				
Overall recruit ranking:
Note: In many cases, Scout, Rivals, 247Sports, On3, and ESPN may conflict in their listings of height and weight.; In these cases, the average was taken. ESPN grades are on a 100-point scale.; Sources: "2017 Team Ranking". Rivals.

=== Recruiting class of 2018 ===
College recruiting information (2018)
Name	Hometown	School	Height	Weight	Commit date
Dwayne Cohill #27 PG	Parma Heights, OH	Holy Name High School	6 ft 1 in (1.85 m)	175 lb (79 kg)	Sep 11, 2017
Dwayne Cohill #27 PG	Recruit ratings: Scout: Rivals: (82)				
Overall recruit ranking:
Note: In many cases, Scout, Rivals, 247Sports, On3, and ESPN may conflict in their listings of height and weight.; In these cases, the average was taken. ESPN grades are on a 100-point scale.; Sources: "2018 Team Ranking". Rivals.

== Preseason ==
In a poll of the league’s head coaches and select media members at the conference's media day, the Flyers were picked to finish in fifth place in the A-10.

== Roster ==
2017–18 Dayton Flyers men's basketball team
Players
Coaches

Pos.	#	Name	Height	Weight	Year	Previous school	Hometown
F	0	Josh Cunningham	6 ft 7 in (2.01 m)	233 lb (106 kg)	RS Jr	Morgan Park; Bradley	Chicago, IL
G	1	Darrell Davis	6 ft 5 in (1.96 m)	170 lb (77 kg)	Sr	Douglass Academy	Detroit, MI
G	3	Trey Landers	6 ft 5 in (1.96 m)	224 lb (102 kg)	So	Wayne	Huber Heights, OH
G	4	Jordan Davis	6 ft 2 in (1.88 m)	195 lb (88 kg)	Fr	Dutch Fork	Irmo, SC
G	10	Jalen Crutcher	6 ft 1 in (1.85 m)	161 lb (73 kg)	Fr	Ridgeway	Memphis, TN
F	11	Matej Svoboda	6 ft 7 in (2.01 m)	224 lb (102 kg)	Fr	Sportovni Gymnazium	Ostrava, Czech Republic
F	12	Obi Toppin (redshirt)	6 ft 8 in (2.03 m)	193 lb (88 kg)	Fr	Mt. Zion Prep (MD)	Ossining, NY
F	13	Kostas Antetokounmpo	6 ft 10 in (2.08 m)	197 lb (89 kg)	RS Fr	Dominican	Athens, Greece
C	14	Jordan Pierce	6 ft 11 in (2.11 m)	265 lb (120 kg)	Fr	Union Catholic	Scotch Plains, NJ
G	15	John Crosby	6 ft 3 in (1.91 m)	197 lb (89 kg)	Jr	New Hampton School	Baltimore, MD
F	20	Xeyrius Williams	6 ft 9 in (2.06 m)	205 lb (93 kg)	Jr	Wayne	Huber Heights, OH
G	23	Jack Westerfield (W)	6 ft 1 in (1.85 m)	180 lb (82 kg)	Jr	St. Xavier	Cincinnati, OH
F	33	Ryan Mikesell	6 ft 7 in (2.01 m)	215 lb (98 kg)	Jr	St. Henry	St. Henry, OH
G	44	Joey Gruden (W)	6 ft 1 in (1.85 m)	185 lb (84 kg)	RS Sr	Sycamore	Leesburg, VA
G	50	Dalton Stewart (W)	6 ft 2 in (1.88 m)	190 lb (86 kg)	Fr	Brookville	Brookville, OH
G	52	Camron Greer (W)	5 ft 7 in (1.7 m)	160 lb (73 kg)	Fr	Rich Central	Country Club Hills, IL

Head coach

- Anthony Grant (Dayton)

Assistant coach(es)

- Anthony Solomon (Virginia)
- James Kane (Florida)
- Ricardo Greer (Pittsburgh)

Legend

- (C) Team captain
- (S) Suspended
- (I) Ineligible
- (W) Walk-on
- Injured
- Current redshirt

Roster
Last update: October 14, 2017

== Schedule and results ==
Date time, TV	Rank^{#}	Opponent^{#}	Result	Record	Site (attendance) city, state
Exhibition
Nov 4, 2017*; 7:00 pm		Ohio Dominican	W 79–61		UD Arena (13,350); Dayton, OH
Non-conference regular season
Nov 10, 2017*; 7:00 pm, SPEC		Ball State	W 78–77	1–0	UD Arena (13,350); Dayton, OH
Nov 16, 2017*; 7:30 pm, ESPNU		vs. Hofstra; Charleston Classic quarterfinals	L 69–72	1–1	TD Arena (3,175); Charleston, SC
Nov 17, 2017*; 7:00 pm, ESPNews		vs. Ohio; Charleston Classic consolation 2nd round	W 79–65	2–1	TD Arena (3,087); Charleston, SC
Nov 19, 2017*; 3:30 pm, ESPN3		vs. Old Dominion; Charleston Classic 5th place game	L 67–74	2–2	TD Arena (2,340); Charleston, SC
Nov 25, 2017*; 7:00 pm, FS Ohio		Akron	W 73–60	3–2	UD Arena (12,872); Dayton, OH
Nov 29, 2017*; 7:00 pm, CBSSN		Auburn; Charleston Classic non-bracket game	L 60–73	3–3	UD Arena (13,125); Dayton, OH
Dec 3, 2017*; 8:00 pm, SECN		at Mississippi State	L 59–61	3–4	Humphrey Coliseum (7,539); Starkville, MS
Dec 6, 2017*; 7:00 pm, SPEC		Tennessee Tech	W 79–66	4–4	UD Arena (12,976); Dayton, OH
Dec 9, 2017*; 3:00 pm, NBCSN		Penn	L 70–78	4–5	UD Arena (13,350); Dayton, OH
Dec 16, 2017*; 7:00 pm, SPEC		Georgia State	W 88–83 ^{OT}	5–5	UD Arena (13,005); Dayton, OH
Dec 19, 2017*; 10:00 pm, FS Ohio		at Saint Mary's	L 54–69	5–6	McKeon Pavilion (3,500); Moraga, CA
Dec 23, 2017*; 3:00 pm, NBCSN		Wagner	W 79–67	6–6	UD Arena (12,878); Dayton, OH
Atlantic 10 regular season
Dec 30, 2017; 4:00 pm, FS Ohio		at Duquesne	L 62–70	6–7 (0–1)	Palumbo Center (2,572); Pittsburgh, PA
Jan 3, 2018; 8:30 pm, CBSSN		St. Bonaventure	W 82–72	7–7 (1–1)	UD Arena (12,188); Dayton, OH
Jan 6, 2018; 12:00 pm, NBCSN		Massachusetts	L 60–62	7–8 (1–2)	UD Arena (12,654); Dayton, OH
Jan 9, 2018; 7:00 pm, Stadium		at Richmond	W 87–81	8–8 (2–2)	Robins Center (5,137); Richmond, VA
Jan 12, 2018; 7:00 pm, ESPN2		VCU	W 106–79	9–8 (3–2)	UD Arena (12,507); Dayton, OH
Jan 17, 2018; 6:30 pm, CBSSN		at Saint Joseph's	L 65–81	9–9 (3–3)	Hagan Arena (3,251); Philadelphia, PA
Jan 20, 2018; 1:00 pm, CBSSN		Rhode Island	L 74–88	9–10 (3–4)	UD Arena (13,350); Dayton, OH
Jan 23, 2018; 7:00 pm, CBSSN		Davidson	W 65–64	10–10 (4–4)	UD Arena (13,173); Dayton, OH
Jan 27, 2018; 4:00 pm, CBSSN		at Saint Louis	L 65–75	10–11 (4–5)	Chaifetz Arena (8,552); St. Louis, MO
Feb 3, 2018; 2:00 pm, SPEC		at Massachusetts	L 82–86 ^{2OT}	10–12 (4–6)	Mullins Center (4,245); Amherst, MA
Feb 7, 2018; 7:00 pm, SPEC		Duquesne	W 88–73	11–12 (5–6)	UD Arena (13,245); Dayton, OH
Feb 10, 2018; 6:00 pm, CBSSN		at VCU	L 84–88 ^{OT}	11–13 (5–7)	Siegel Center (7,637); Richmond, VA
Feb 14, 2018; 7:00 pm, SPEC		at George Mason	L 67–85	11–14 (5–8)	EagleBank Arena (3,047); Fairfax, VA
Feb 17, 2018; 7:00 pm, FS Ohio		Fordham	W 80–70	12–14 (6–8)	UD Arena (13,350); Dayton, OH
Feb 20, 2018; 9:00 pm, ESPNU		Saint Louis	W 53–50	13–14 (7–8)	UD Arena (12,577); Dayton, OH
Feb 23, 2018; 7:00 pm, ESPN2		at No. 18 Rhode Island	L 56–81	13–15 (7–9)	Ryan Center (7,880); Kingston, RI
Feb 28, 2018; 7:00 pm		at La Salle	L 53–71	13–16 (7–10)	Tom Gola Arena (1,378); Philadelphia, PA
Mar 3, 2018; 12:30 pm, NBCSN		George Washington	W 88–78	14–16 (8–10)	UD Arena (13,350); Dayton, OH
Atlantic 10 tournament
Mar 8, 2018; 12:00 pm, NBCSN	(9)	vs. (8) VCU; Second round	L 72–77	14–17	Capital One Arena (6,483); Washington, D.C.
*Non-conference game. ^{#}Rankings from AP Poll. (#) Tournament seedings in parentheses. All times are in Eastern Time.
