= 2017–18 Ohio Bobcats men's basketball team =

American college basketball season

2017–18 Ohio Bobcats men's basketball
- Conference: Mid-American Conference
- East Division
- Record: 14–17 (7–11 MAC)
- Head coach: Saul Phillips (4th season)
- Assistant coaches: Will Ryan; Jason Kemp; Aaron Fuss
- Home arena: Convocation Center

2017–18 Mid-American Conference men's basketball standings
	Conf.				Overall
Team	W		L	PCT	W		L	PCT
East
Buffalo †	15	–	3	.833	27	–	9	.750
Kent State	9	–	9	.500	17	–	17	.500
Miami (OH)	8	–	10	.444	16	–	18	.471
Bowling Green	7	–	11	.389	16	–	16	.500
Ohio	7	–	11	.389	14	–	17	.452
Akron	6	–	12	.333	14	–	18	.438
West
Toledo	13	–	5	.722	23	–	11	.676
Eastern Michigan	11	–	7	.611	22	–	13	.629
Ball State	10	–	8	.556	19	–	13	.594
Western Michigan	9	–	9	.500	17	–	15	.531
Central Michigan	7	–	11	.389	21	–	15	.583
Northern Illinois	6	–	12	.333	13	–	19	.406
† 2018 MAC tournament winner

The 2017–18 Ohio Bobcats men's basketball team represented Ohio University during the 2017–18 NCAA Division I men's basketball season. The Bobcats, led by fourth-year head coach Saul Phillips, played their home games at the Convocation Center in Athens, Ohio as a member of the East Division of the Mid-American Conference. They finished the season 14–17, 7–11 in MAC play to finish in a tie for fourth place in the East Division. They lost in the first round of the MAC tournament to Miami (OH).

== Roster ==
2017–18 Ohio Bobcats men's basketball team
Players
Coaches

Pos.	#	Name	Height	Weight	Year	Previous school	Hometown
G	0	Zach Butler	6 ft 3 in (1.91 m)	—	Fr	Dorman High School	Spartanburg, SC
F	1	Jason Carter	6 ft 8 in (2.03 m)	227 lb (103 kg)	So	Johnstown-Monroe	Johnstown, OH
G	3	James Gollon	6 ft 5 in (1.96 m)	—	RS So	Pacelli	Stevens Point, WI
G	4	Teyvion Kirk	6 ft 4 in (1.93 m)	185 lb (84 kg)	Fr	Joliet West HS	Joliet, IL
F	5	Ben Vander Plas	6 ft 8 in (2.03 m)	232 lb (105 kg)	Fr	Ripon	Ripon, WI
G	10	Antonio Bisutti	6 ft 2 in (1.88 m)	—	Sr	Dublin Scioto	Dublin, OH
G	11	C.J. Rhodes	5 ft 8 in (1.73 m)	—	Fr	Mt. Healthy	Cincinnati, OH
F	15	Jaylin McDonald (W)	6 ft 6 in (1.98 m)	—	Jr	St. Ignatius	Streetsboro, OH
F	21	Sam Frayer (W)	6 ft 8 in (2.03 m)	—	Sr	Madeira	Cincinnati, OH
G/F	22	Gavin Block	6 ft 7 in (2.01 m)	209 lb (95 kg)	Jr	Lincoln Community High School	Lincoln, IL
F	23	Kevin Mickle	6 ft 7 in (2.01 m)	—	GS	St. Benedict's Prep	Brooklyn, NY
G	24	Mike Laster	6 ft 5 in (1.96 m)	—	Sr	Cass Technical	Detroit, MI
F	25	Ellis Dozier	6 ft 8 in (2.03 m)	—	RS So	Sandy Spring, MD
G	35	Jordan Dartis	6 ft 3 in (1.91 m)	—	Jr	Northland High School	Newark, OH
F	44	A.J. Gareri	6 ft 9 in (2.06 m)	—	So	Ellet	Akron, OH
F	45	Doug Taylor	6 ft 9 in (2.06 m)	258 lb (117 kg)	So	Northland High School	Columbus, OH

Head coach

- Saul Phillips (UW–Platteville)

Assistant coach(es)

- Will Ryan (Wisconsin)
- Jason Kemp (UW–La Crosse)
- Aaron Fuss (Ohio State)

Legend

- (C) Team captain
- (S) Suspended
- (I) Ineligible
- (W) Walk-on
- Injured
- Current redshirt

Roster

== Preseason ==
The preseason poll and league awards were announced by the league office on October 26, 2017. Ohio was picked to finish fourth in the MAC East. Jordan Dartis and Jason Carter were both on the Preseason All-MAC East team.

=== Preseason men's basketball poll ===
(First place votes in parentheses)

==== East Division ====
1. Buffalo 166 (24)
2. Kent State 139 (2)
3. Ohio 127 (3)
4. Akron 84 (1)
5. Bowling Green 82
6. Miami 32

==== West Division ====
1. Western Michigan 169 (22)
2. Ball State 156 (8)
3. Toledo 107
4. Eastern Michigan 103
5. Northern Illinois 57
6. Central Michigan 38

==== Tournament champs ====
Western Michigan (10), Buffalo (9), Ball State (5), Kent State (2), Toledo (2), Bowling Green (1), Miami (1)

=== Preseason All-MAC ===
Preseason All-MAC teams
Team	Player	Position	Year
Preseason All-MAC East	Jordan Dartis	G	Sr.
Preseason All-MAC East	Jason Carter	F	So.

== Previous season ==
The Bobcats finished the 2016–17 season 20–10, 11–7 in MAC play to finish in a tie for second place in the East Division. As the No. 2 seed in the MAC tournament, they defeated Toledo before losing to eventual tournament champion Kent State in the semifinals.

== Schedule and results ==
Date time, TV	Rank^{#}	Opponent^{#}	Result	Record	Site (attendance) city, state
Exhibition
November 04, 2017; 3:30 pm		Capital	W 80–57		Convocation Center; Athens, OH
Non-conference regular season
November 11, 2017*; 2:00 pm, ESPN3		Alabama A&M	W 61–53	1–0	Convocation Center (4,037); Athens, OH
November 16, 2017*; 5:00 pm, ESPN2		vs. Clemson; Charleston Classic quarterfinals	L 76–81	1–1	TD Arena (3,175); Charleston, SC
November 17, 2017*; 7:00 pm, ESPNews		vs. Dayton; Charleston Classic consolation round	L 65–79	1–2	TD Arena (3,087); Charleston, SC
November 19, 2017*; 1:00 pm, ESPN3		vs. Indiana State; Charleston Classic 7th place game	W 96–94 ^{4OT}	2–2	TD Arena (2,340); Charleston, SC
November 24, 2017*; 7:00 pm		Mount St. Mary's	W 96–77	3–2	Convocation Center (4,099); Athens, OH
November 28, 2017*; 7:00 pm, ESPN3		Iona	L 88–93	3–3	Convocation Center (4,383); Athens, OH
December 1, 2017*; 7:00 pm, ESPN3		Coppin State	W 80–37	4–3	Convocation Center (4,137); Athens, OH
December 7, 2017*; 7:00 pm, BTN		at Maryland	L 62–87	4–4	Xfinity Center (12,914); College Park, MD
December 10, 2017*; 2:00 pm, ESPN3		Western Kentucky	W 89–84	5–4	Convocation Center (4,501); Athens, OH
December 16, 2017*; 8:00 pm		at Marshall	L 96–99 ^{OT}	5–5	Cam Henderson Center (5,117); Huntington, WV
December 20, 2017*; 7:00 pm		Prairie View A&M	W 84–65	6–5	Convocation Center (5,193); Athens, OH
December 29, 2017*; 7:00 pm		Northwest Ohio	W 65–58	7–5	Convocation Center (5,251); Athens, OH
MAC regular season
January 2, 2018; 7:00 pm, ESPN3		at Central Michigan	L 50–75	7–6 (0–1)	McGuirk Arena (1,655); Mount Pleasant, MI
January 6, 2018; 3:30 pm, ESPN3		Northern Illinois	W 78–68	8–6 (1–1)	Convocation Center (7,066); Athens, OH
January 9, 2018; 7:00 pm, ESPN3		Ball State	L 68–75	8–7 (1–2)	Convocation Center (4,892); Athens, OH
January 12, 2018; 7:00 pm, CBSSN		at Kent State	L 69–70	8–8 (1–3)	MAC Center (2,114); Kent, OH
January 16, 2018; 7:00 pm, ESPN3		Toledo	L 57–91	8–9 (1–4)	Convocation Center (6,040); Athens, OH
January 20, 2018; 2:00 pm, ESPN3		at Eastern Michigan	W 72–66	9–9 (2–4)	Ypsilanti, MI (1,513); Convocation Center
January 23, 2018; 7:00 pm, ESPN3		at Akron	L 68–71	9–10 (2–5)	James A. Rhodes Arena (2,653); Akron, OH
January 26, 2018; 6:30 pm, CBSSN		Buffalo	L 66–73	9–11 (2–6)	Convocation Center (6,470); Athens, OH
January 30, 2018; 7:00 pm, ESPN3		at Bowling Green	L 50–66	9–12 (2–7)	Stroh Center (1,540); Bowling Green, OH
February 3, 2018; 3:30 pm, ESPN3		Central Michigan	L 98–101 ^{2OT}	9–13 (2–8)	Convocation Center (8,027); Athens, OH
February 6, 2018; 3:30 pm, ESPN3		Akron	W 99–75	10–13 (3–8)	Convocation Center; Athens, OH
February 10, 2018; 4:30 pm, ESPN3		at Western Michigan	L 60–69	10–14 (3–9)	University Arena (2,707); Kalamazoo, MI
February 13, 2018; 7:00 pm, ESPN3		at Toledo	L 74–82	10–15 (3–10)	Savage Arena (4,502); Toledo, OH
February 17, 2018; 3:30 pm, ESPN3		Miami (OH)	W 92–87 ^{OT}	11–15 (4–10)	Convocation Center (6,872); Athens, OH
February 20, 2018; 7:00 pm, ESPN3		Kent State	W 88–76	12–15 (5–10)	Convocation Center (6,339); Athens, OH
February 24, 2018; 3:30 pm, ESPN3		at Buffalo	L 82–108	12–16 (5–11)	Alumni Arena (6,198); Amherst, NY
February 27, 2018; 7:00 pm, ESPN3		Bowling Green	W 75–59	13–16 (6–11)	Convocation Center (6,108); Athens, OH
March 2, 2018; 7:00 pm, ESPN3		at Miami (OH)	W 75–66	14–16 (7–11)	Millett Hall (2,900); Oxford, OH
MAC tournament
March 5, 2018; 7:00 pm, ESPN3	(10)	at (7) Miami (OH)	L 55–68	14–17	Millett Hall (1,752); Oxford, OH
*Non-conference game. ^{#}Rankings from AP Poll. (#) Tournament seedings in parentheses. All times are in Eastern Time.

== Statistics ==
=== Team statistics ===
Final 2017–18 statistics

Record	Ohio	OPP
Scoring	2334	2353
Scoring Average	75.29	75.90
Field goals – Att	839–1893	839–1943
3-pt. Field goals – Att	244–661	249–772
Free throws – Att	412–579	426–567
Rebounds	1127	1200
Assists	443	389
Turnovers	412	415
Steals	207	189
Blocked Shots	103	109

=== Player statistics ===
			Minutes		Scoring		Total FGs			3-point FGs			Free-Throws			Rebounds								
Player	GP	GS	Tot	Avg	Pts	Avg	FG	FGA	Pct	3FG	3FA	Pct	FT	FTA	Pct	Off	Def	Tot	Avg	A	PF	TO	Stl	Blk
Teyvion Kirk	31	31	993	32	473	15.3	160	365	0.438	16	40	0.4	137	190	0.721	34	154	188	6.1	95	78	105	42	5
Mike Laster	30	30	992	33.1	435	14.5	164	344	0.477	54	138	0.391	53	75	0.707	14	73	87	2.9	58	58	45	17	5
Jordan Dartis	29	29	886	30.6	381	13.1	124	288	0.431	78	184	0.424	55	65	0.846	12	91	103	3.6	62	58	40	34	4
Gavin Block	31	25	943	30.4	264	8.5	89	243	0.366	49	150	0.327	37	62	0.597	18	111	129	4.2	106	74	50	23	10
Kevin Mickle	28	2	584	20.9	238	8.5	98	203	0.483	5	18	0.278	37	56	0.661	32	71	103	3.7	25	49	36	23	12
Doug Taylor	31	31	745	24	214	6.9	94	166	0.566	1	3	0.333	25	47	0.532	73	149	222	7.2	21	88	43	17	61
James Gollon	31	7	669	21.6	211	6.8	67	147	0.456	35	91	0.385	42	48	0.875	16	94	110	3.5	40	51	37	31	5
Zach Butler	30	0	399	13.3	76	2.5	30	84	0.357	4	20	0.2	12	17	0.706	0	45	45	1.5	29	31	34	14	1
Jason Carter	3	0	42	14	20	6.7	5	17	0.294	0	3	0	10	12	0.833	2	8	10	3.3	5	3	3	5	0
A.J. Gareri	10	0	61	6.1	9	0.9	2	9	0.222	1	5	0.2	4	6	0.667	0	7	7	0.7	1	4	4	0	0
Sam Frayer	6	0	14	2.3	7	1.2	3	9	0.333	1	5	0.2	0	0	0	1	5	6	1	0	0	0	0	0
Ellis Dozier	11	0	39	3.5	6	0.5	3	12	0.25	0	2	0	0	1	0	2	2	4	0.4	0	6	1	0	0
Antonio Bisutti	6	0	13	2.2	0	0	0	5	0	0	2	0	0	0	0	0	0	0	0	1	0	0	0	0
Jaylin McDonald	7	0	15	2.1	0	0	0	1	0	0	0	0	0	0	0	1	3	4	0.6	0	0	0	1	0
Total	31	-	6400	-	2334	75.3	839	1893	0.443	244	661	0.369	412	579	0.712	259	868	1127	36.4	443	500	412	207	103
Opponents	31	-	6400	-	2353	75.9	839	1943	0.432	249	772	0.323	426	567	0.751	305	895	1200	38.7	389	551	415	189	109

Legend
GP	Games played	GS	Games started	Avg	Average per game
FG	Field-goals made	FGA	Field-goal attempts	Off	Offensive rebounds
Def	Defensive rebounds	A	Assists	TO	Turnovers
Blk	Blocks	Stl	Steals	High	Team high

== Awards and honors ==
=== All-MAC Awards ===
Postseason All-MAC teams
Team	Player	Position	Year
All-MAC Honorable Mention	Jordan Dartis	G	Jr.
All-MAC Freshman Team	Teyvion Kirk	G	Fr.

== See also ==
- 2017–18 Ohio Bobcats women's basketball team
