= 2017–18 Miami RedHawks men's basketball team =

American college basketball season

2017–18 Miami RedHawks men's basketball

CBI, First round
- Conference: Mid-American Conference
- East Division
- Record: 16–18 (8–10 MAC)
- Head coach: Jack Owens (1st season)
- Assistant coaches: Jeff Rutter; J.R. Reynolds; Kenneth Lowe
- Home arena: Millett Hall

2017–18 Mid-American Conference men's basketball standings
	Conf.				Overall
Team	W		L	PCT	W		L	PCT
East
Buffalo †	15	–	3	.833	27	–	9	.750
Kent State	9	–	9	.500	17	–	17	.500
Miami (OH)	8	–	10	.444	16	–	18	.471
Bowling Green	7	–	11	.389	16	–	16	.500
Ohio	7	–	11	.389	14	–	17	.452
Akron	6	–	12	.333	14	–	18	.438
West
Toledo	13	–	5	.722	23	–	11	.676
Eastern Michigan	11	–	7	.611	22	–	13	.629
Ball State	10	–	8	.556	19	–	13	.594
Western Michigan	9	–	9	.500	17	–	15	.531
Central Michigan	7	–	11	.389	21	–	15	.583
Northern Illinois	6	–	12	.333	13	–	19	.406
† 2018 MAC tournament winner

The 2017–18 Miami RedHawks men's basketball team represented Miami University during the 2017–18 NCAA Division I men's basketball season. The RedHawks, led by first-year head coach Jack Owens, played their home games at Millett Hall, as members of the East Division of the Mid-American Conference. They finished the season 16–18, 8–10 in MAC play to finish in third place in the East Division. They defeated Ohio in the first round of the MAC tournament to advance to the quarterfinals where they lost to Toledo. They were invited to the College Basketball Invitational where they lost in the first round to Campbell.

== Previous season ==
The RedHawks finished the 2016–17 season 11–21, 4–14 in MAC play to finish in last place. As the No. 12 seed in the MAC tournament, they lost in the first round to Western Michigan.

Head coach John Cooper was fired on March 10, 2017, after five seasons at Miami. Purdue associate head coach Jack Owens was named the new head coach on March 29.

== Roster ==
2017–18 Miami RedHawks men's basketball team
Players
Coaches

Pos.	#	Name	Height	Weight	Year	Previous school	Hometown
G	3	Jalen Adaway	6 ft 5 in (1.96 m)	205 lb (93 kg)	Fr	Logansport HS	Logansport, IN
F	5	Precious Ayah	6 ft 6 in (1.98 m)	228 lb (103 kg)	RS Fr	Greenforest (GA)	Bayelsia State, Nigeria
F	14	Bam Bowman	6 ft 8 in (2.03 m)	275 lb (125 kg)	So	Warren Central/Shawnee	Bowling Green, KY
F	20	Dalonte Brown	6 ft 7 in (2.01 m)	196 lb (89 kg)	Fr	Bowsher	Toledo, OH
F	4	Isaiah Coleman-Lands	6 ft 7 in (2.01 m)	156 lb (71 kg)	Fr	La Lumiere School	Indianapolis, IN
G	30	Abdoulaye Harouna	6 ft 5 in (1.96 m)	178 lb (81 kg)	Sr	South Kent, CT/Southern Idaho	Niamay, Niger
C	0	Darius Harper	6 ft 8 in (2.03 m)	290 lb (132 kg)	So	Springfield HS	Springfield, OH
G	15	Milos Jovic	6 ft 4 in (1.93 m)	183 lb (83 kg)	So	GB Academy (Czech Republic)	Leskovac, Serbia
F	11	Logan McLane	6 ft 9 in (2.06 m)	225 lb (102 kg)	Sr	Greenfield School	Winterville, NC
F	2	Rod Mills Jr.	6 ft 7 in (2.01 m)	206 lb (93 kg)	Sr	St. Xavier	Cincinnati, OH
G	22	Grant Pitman	6 ft 4 in (1.93 m)	185 lb (84 kg)	Jr	Moeller	Cincinnati, OH
G	12	Darrian Ringo	6 ft 2 in (1.88 m)	173 lb (78 kg)	Jr	Brownsburg HS	Brownsburg, IN
G	21	Michael Ritchie	6 ft 5 in (1.96 m)	187 lb (85 kg)	Fr	Mt. Prospect HS	Mt. Prospect, IL
G	1	Nike Sibande	6 ft 3 in (1.91 m)	178 lb (81 kg)	Fr	Crispus Attucks	Indianapolis, IN
G	13	Jake Wright	6 ft 4 in (1.93 m)	202 lb (92 kg)	RS Jr	Hopkins HS	Hopkins, MN

Head coach

- Jack Owens (Eastern Illinois)

Assistant coach(es)

- Jeff Rutter (Winona State)
- J.R. Reynolds (Eastern Illinois)
- Kenneth Lowe (Purdue)

Legend

- (C) Team captain
- (S) Suspended
- (I) Ineligible
- (W) Walk-on
- Injured
- Current redshirt

Roster
Last update: December 6, 2017

== Schedule and results ==
Date time, TV	Rank^{#}	Opponent^{#}	Result	Record	Site (attendance) city, state
Non-conference regular season
Nov 10, 2017*; 7:00 pm		at Fordham	W 55–54	1–0	Rose Hill Gymnasium (1,923); Bronx, NY
Nov 14, 2017*; 7:00 pm, ESPN3		Wright State	W 73–67 ^{OT}	2–0	Millett Hall (996); Oxford, OH
Nov 17, 2017*; 8:30 pm, CBSSN		vs. LIU Brooklyn; Jamaica Classic semifinals	W 78–74	3–0	Montego Bay Convention Centre (1,431); Montego Bay, Jamaica
Nov 19, 2017*; 10:10 pm, CBSSN		vs. Hartford; Jamaica Classic championship game	L 58–68	3–1	Montego Bay Convention Centre (1,951); Montego Bay, Jamaica
Nov 22, 2017*; 8:00 pm, ESPN3		at Tulane	L 59–80	3–2	Devlin Fieldhouse (1,537); New Orleans, LA
Nov 26, 2017*; 3:00 pm		at Austin Peay	L 61–86	3–3	Dunn Center (1,164); Clarksville, TN
Nov 29, 2017*; 7:00 pm, ESPN3		Midway	W 123–40	4–3	Millett Hall (580); Oxford, OH
Dec 2, 2017*; 8:00 pm, ESPN3		at Western Illinois	W 76–73 ^{2OT}	5–3	Millett Hall (658); Macomb, IL
Dec 5, 2017*; 9:00 pm, SECN		at Missouri	L 51–70	5–4	Mizzou Arena (15,061); Columbia, MO
Dec 9, 2017*; 1:00 pm, ESPN3		Fort Wayne	W 81–73	6–4	Millett Hall (811); Oxford, OH
Dec 17, 2017*; 2:00 pm, ESPN3		Rio Grande	W 109–70	7–4	Millett Hall (907); Oxford, OH
Dec 21, 2017*; 9:00 pm, FS1		at DePaul	L 66–83	7–5	Wintrust Arena (4,890); Chicago, IL
Dec 30, 2017*; 12:00 pm, ESPNU		at Ohio State	L 59–72	7–6	Value City Arena (15,131); Columbus, OH
MAC regular season
Jan 2, 2018; 7:00 pm, ESPN3		at Bowling Green	W 77–72	8–6 (1–0)	Stroh Center (1,524); Bowling Green, OH
Jan 6, 2018; 3:30 pm, ESPN3		Western Michigan	L 62–67	8–7 (1–1)	Millett Hall (3,809); Oxford, OH
Jan 9, 2018; 7:00 pm, ESPN3		Kent State	W 80–69	9–7 (2–1)	Millett Hall (884); Oxford, OH
Jan 13, 2018; 2:00 pm		at Buffalo	L 66–82	9–8 (2–2)	Alumni Arena (3,139); Amherst, NY
Jan 16, 2018; 7:00 pm, ESPN3		Bowling Green	L 70–81	9–9 (2–3)	Millett Hall (996); Oxford, OH
Jan 20, 2018; 3:30 pm, ESPN3		Ball State	W 71–53	10–9 (3–3)	Millett Hall (1,023); Oxford, OH
Jan 23, 2018; 7:00 pm, ESPN3		at Central Michigan	W 70–61	11–9 (4–3)	McGuirk Arena (2,125); Mount Pleasant, MI
Jan 27, 2018; 3:30 pm, ESPN3		Eastern Michigan	L 48–58	11–10 (4–4)	Millett Hall (1,528); Oxford, OH
Jan 30, 2018; 7:00 pm, ESPN3		Akron	W 79–64	12–10 (5–4)	Millett Hall (1,808); Oxford, OH
Feb 3, 2018; 4:30 pm, ESPN3		at Northern Illinois	W 81–65	13–10 (6–4)	Convocation Center (1,280); DeKalb, IL
Feb 6, 2018; 7:00 pm, ESPN3		at Western Michigan	L 64–68	13–11 (6–5)	University Arena (1,878); Kalamazoo, MI
Feb 9, 2018; 6:00 pm, CBSSN		Toledo	L 67–73	13–12 (6–6)	Millett Hall (3,525); Oxford, OH
Feb 13, 2018; 7:00 pm, ESPN3		at Eastern Michigan	L 57–58	13–13 (6–7)	Convocation Center (1,331); Ypsilanti, MI
Feb 17, 2018; 3:30 pm, ESPN3		at Ohio	L 87–92 ^{OT}	13–14 (6–8)	Convocation Center (6,872); Athens, OH
Feb 20, 2018; 7:00 pm, ESPN3		Buffalo	W 84–81	14–14 (7–8)	Millett Hall (1,870); Oxford, OH
Feb 24, 2018; 2:00 pm, CBSSN		at Akron	W 64–62 ^{OT}	15–14 (8–8)	Rhodes Arena (2,751); Akron, OH
Feb 27, 2018; 7:00 pm, ESPN3		at Kent State	L 83–90 ^{OT}	15–15 (8–9)	MAC Center (3,074); Kent, OH
Mar 2, 2018; 7:00 pm, ESPN3		Ohio	L 66–75	15–16 (8–10)	Millett Hall (2,900); Oxford, OH
MAC tournament
Mar 5, 2018; 7:00 pm, ESPN3	(7)	(10) Ohio; First round	W 68–55	16–16	Millett Hall (1,752); Oxford, OH
Mar 7, 2018; 6:30 pm, ESPN3	(7)	(2) Toledo; Quarterfinals	L 69–71	16–17	Quicken Loans Arena (2,605); Cleveland, OH
CBI
Mar 14, 2018*; 7:00 pm		at Campbell; First round	L 87–97	16–18	Gore Arena (1,411); Buies Creek, NC
*Non-conference game. ^{#}Rankings from AP Poll. (#) Tournament seedings in parentheses. All times are in Eastern Time.

== See also ==
- 2017–18 Miami RedHawks women's basketball team
