= 2017–18 Eastern Michigan Eagles men's basketball team =

American college basketball season

2017–18 Eastern Michigan Eagles men's basketball

CIT, Second Round
- Conference: Mid-American Conference
- West Division
- Record: 22–13 (11–7 MAC)
- Head coach: Rob Murphy (7th season)
- Assistant coaches: Kevin Mondro; Matt Cline; Jimmy Wooten
- Home arena: Convocation Center

2017–18 Mid-American Conference men's basketball standings
	Conf.				Overall
Team	W		L	PCT	W		L	PCT
East
Buffalo †	15	–	3	.833	27	–	9	.750
Kent State	9	–	9	.500	17	–	17	.500
Miami (OH)	8	–	10	.444	16	–	18	.471
Bowling Green	7	–	11	.389	16	–	16	.500
Ohio	7	–	11	.389	14	–	17	.452
Akron	6	–	12	.333	14	–	18	.438
West
Toledo	13	–	5	.722	23	–	11	.676
Eastern Michigan	11	–	7	.611	22	–	13	.629
Ball State	10	–	8	.556	19	–	13	.594
Western Michigan	9	–	9	.500	17	–	15	.531
Central Michigan	7	–	11	.389	21	–	15	.583
Northern Illinois	6	–	12	.333	13	–	19	.406
† 2018 MAC tournament winner

The 2017–18 Eastern Michigan Eagles men's basketball team represented Eastern Michigan University during the 2017–18 NCAA Division I men's basketball season. The Eagles, led by seventh-year head coach Rob Murphy, played their home games at the Convocation Center in Ypsilanti, Michigan as members of the West Division of the Mid-American Conference. They finished the season 22–13, 11–7 in MAC play to finish in second place in the West Division. They defeated Akron in the quarterfinals of the MAC tournament before losing in the semifinals to Toledo. They were invited to the CollegeInsider.com Tournament where they defeated Niagara in the first round before losing in the second round to Sam Houston State.

== Previous season ==
They finished the 2016–17 regular season 15–16, 7–11 in MAC play to finish in a tie for eighth place. Due to tiebreaking rules, they received the No. 8 seed in the MAC tournament. They beat Northern Illinois in the opening round of the MAC Tournament but ultimately lost to the No. 1 seed Akron Zips in the quarterfinals.

== Offseason ==
=== Departures ===
Name	Number	Pos.	Height	Weight	Year	Hometown	Notes
Ray Lee	0	G	6'3"	190	RS Senior	Detroit, MI	Graduated
Willie Mangum IV	10	G	6'1"	220	Senior	Richmond, VA	Graduated
Blake Brown	20	F	6'7"	175	RS Sophomore	Novi, MI	Transferred to Rochester College
Quaran Jones	21	F	6'7"	225	RS Senior	Fargo, ND	Graduated
Lamar Wofford-Humphrey	23	F	6'9"	225	RS Junior	Chicago, IL	Transferred to Omaha
Ty Toney	32	G	6'3"	220	RS Senior	Atlanta, GA	Graduated
Nick Madray	35	F	6'9"	220	RS Senior	Mississauga, Ontario	Graduate transfer to Wagner
Baylee Steele	40	C	6'11"	235	Sophomore	Norwalk, IA	Transferred to Utah Valley

=== Incoming transfers ===
Name	Number	Pos.	Height	Weight	Year	Hometown	Previous School
Malik Ellison	0	G	5'8"	160	Freshman	Flint, MI	Beecher
Bud Jones	20	F	6'8"	250	Freshman	Anderson, SC	TL Hanna
Kevin McAdoo	21	G	6'2"	162	Freshman	West Bloomfield, MI	West Bloomfield
Tariq Silver	22	G	6'5"	185	Freshman	Clarksville, TN	Northwest
Jorden Peterson	23	G	6'4"	175	Freshman	Detroit, MI	CMA
Jalen King	30	F	6'9"	204	Freshman	Pasco, WA	Kings Academy
Ty Groce	31	F	6'7"	195	RS Freshman	Ypsilanti, MI	Lincoln
Isaiah Green	32	F	6'7"	200	Junior	Southfield, MI	Lansing Community College
Derek Ballard Jr.	33	F	6'8"	220	Freshman	Southfield, MI	Southfield-Lathrup

== Preseason ==
In the MAC preseason poll, the Eagles were picked to finish in fourth place in the MAC West Division.

== Roster ==
2017–18 Eastern Michigan Eagles men's basketball team
Players
Coaches

Pos.	#	Name	Height	Weight	Year	Previous school	Hometown
G	0	Malik Ellison	5 ft 8 in (1.73 m)	160 lb (73 kg)	Fr	Beecher	Flint, MI
G	1	Tim Bond	6 ft 7 in (2.01 m)	160 lb (73 kg)	Sr	City College HS	Baltimore, MD
F/C	2	James Thompson IV	6 ft 10 in (2.08 m)	240 lb (109 kg)	Jr	Parkview Baptist	Baton Rouge, LA
G	3	Paul Jackson	6 ft 2 in (1.88 m)	175 lb (79 kg)	RS Jr	Martin Luther King Jr./Eastern Kentucky	Stone Mountain, GA
G/F	4	Terry Harris	6 ft 6 in (1.98 m)	215 lb (98 kg)	RS Jr	Half Hollow Hills West/Houston Baptist	Dix Hills, NY
F	5	Elijah Minnie	6 ft 9 in (2.06 m)	200 lb (91 kg)	RS Jr	Lincoln Park/Robert Morris	Monessen, PA
G	12	Jalen Brown (W)	5 ft 9 in (1.75 m)	160 lb (73 kg)	So	Harper Woods	Harper Woods, MI
F	15	Jordan Nobles	6 ft 9 in (2.06 m)	195 lb (88 kg)	RS Jr	Canton	Canton, MI
F	20	Bud Jones	6 ft 8 in (2.03 m)	250 lb (113 kg)	Fr	TL Hanna	Anderson, SC
G	21	Kevin McAdoo	6 ft 2 in (1.88 m)	162 lb (73 kg)	Fr	West Bloomfield	West Bloomfield, MI
G	22	Tariq Silver	6 ft 5 in (1.96 m)	185 lb (84 kg)	Fr	Northwest	Clarksville, TN
G	23	Jorden Peterson	6 ft 4 in (1.93 m)	175 lb (79 kg)	Fr	CMA	Detroit, MI
F	30	Jalen King	6 ft 9 in (2.06 m)	214 lb (97 kg)	Fr	Kings Academy	Pasco, WA
F	31	Ty Groce	6 ft 7 in (2.01 m)	195 lb (88 kg)	RS Fr	Lincoln	Ypsilanti, MI
F	32	Isaiah Green	6 ft 7 in (2.01 m)	200 lb (91 kg)	Jr	Southfield/Lansing Community College	Southfield, MI
F	33	Derek Ballard Jr.	6 ft 8 in (2.03 m)	220 lb (100 kg)	Fr	Southfield-Lathrup	Southfield, MI

Head coach

- Rob Murphy (Central State)

Assistant coach(es)

- Kevin Mondro (Detroit Mercy)
- Matt Kline (South Alabama)
- Jimmy Wooten (Arkansas State)

Legend

- (C) Team captain
- (S) Suspended
- (I) Ineligible
- (W) Walk-on
- Injured
- Current redshirt

Roster

== Accolades ==
MAC West Division Preseason All-MAC Team

- James Thompson IV

Hoosier Tipoff Classic All-Tournament Team

- Elijah Minnie

MAC West Division Player of the Week

- James Thompson IV (Dec. 18)

== Schedule and results ==
Date time, TV	Rank^{#}	Opponent^{#}	Result	Record	High points	High rebounds	High assists	Site (attendance) city, state
Non-conference regular season
November 10, 2017*; 10:30 am, ESPN3		Spring Arbor; Education Day	W 92–60	1–0	22 – Minnie	14 – Thompson IV	5 – Tied	Convocation Center (4,767); Ypsilanti, MI
November 12, 2017*; 2:00 pm, ESPN3		UM–Dearborn	W 97–73	2–0	27 – Minnie	13 – Thompson IV	6 – Bond	Convocation Center (774); Ypsilanti, MI
November 16, 2017*; 7:00 pm, ESPN3		Arkansas State; Hoosier Tip-Off Classic	W 76–59	3–0	23 – Thompson IV	11 – Thompson IV	7 – Jackson	Convocation Center (741); Ypsilanti, MI
November 18, 2017*; 2:00 AM, ESPN3		Howard; Hoosier Tip-Off Classic	W 76–66	4–0	21 – Minnie	14 – Thompson IV	6 – Jackson	Convocation Center (819); Ypsilanti, MI
November 24, 2017*; 4:30 pm, BTN		at Indiana; Hoosier Tip-Off Classic	L 67–87	4–1	20 – Minnie	8 – Thompson IV	5 – Jackson	Simon Skjodt Assembly Hall (12,024); Bloomington, IN
November 26, 2017*; 4:00 pm, ESPN3		at South Florida; Hoosier Tip-Off Classic	W 65–47	5–1	15 – Jackson	11 – Thompson IV	3 – Tied	USF Sun Dome (2,050); Tampa, FL
November 29, 2017*; 7:00 pm, ESPN3		at North Florida	L 81—84 ^{OT}	5—2	29 – Thompson IV	15 – Thompson IV	4 – Bond	UNF Arena (1,589); Jacksonville, FL
December 6, 2017*; 7:00 pm, ESPN3		Oakland	W 95–89	6–2	24 – 3 tied	12 – Tied	6 – Jackson	Convocation Center (1,666); Ypsilanti, MI
December 09, 2017*; 2:00 pm, ESPN3		Central State	W 80–65	7–2	19 – Tied	18 – Thompson IV	5 – Jackson	Convocation Center (987); Ypsilanti, MI
December 16, 2017*; 4:00 pm		at Long Beach State	W 85–80	8–2	23 – Minnie	11 – Thompson IV	7 – Jackson	Walter Pyramid (2,391); Long Beach, CA
December 22, 2017*; 7:00 pm, ESPN3		at Oakland	L 81–86	8–3	25 – Jackson	9 – Thompson IV	6 – Jackson	Athletics Center O'rena (3,661); Auburn Hills, MI
December 27, 2017*; 7:00 pm, ESPN2		at Syracuse	L 47–62	8–4	13 – Minnie	9 – Thompson IV	3 – Tied	Carrier Dome (21,925); Syracuse, NY
December 29, 2017*; 2:00 pm, ESPN3		Rochester	W 67–48	9–4	12 – Tied	8 – Thompson IV	5 – Jackson	Convocation Center (1,124); Ypsilanti, MI
MAC regular season
January 2, 2018; 7:00 pm, ESPN3		Ball State	L 62–72	9–5 (0–1)	25 – Minnie	8 – Thompson IV	4 – Jackson	Worthen Arena (3,025); Muncie, IN
January 6, 2018; 12:00 pm, ESPN3		Bowling Green	L 71–75 ^{OT}	9–6 (0–2)	21 – Jackson	14 – Thompson IV	5 – Jackson	Convocation Center (1,253); Ypsilanti, MI
January 9, 2018; 7:00 pm, ESPN3		Central Michigan; Michigan MAC Trophy	W 79–74	10–6 (1–2)	25 – Minnie	12 – Thompson IV	6 – Jackson	Convocation Center (1,623); Ypsilanti, MI
January 13, 2018; 3:30 pm, ESPN3		at Northern Illinois	L 66–72	10–7 (1–3)	19 – Jackson	12 – Thompson IV	3 – Jackson	Convocation Center (1,144); DeKalb, IL
January 16, 2018; 7:00 pm, ESPN3		Akron	W 63–49	11–7 (2–3)	22 – Minnie	8 – Thompson IV	4 – Jackson	Convocation Center (1,254); Ypsilanti, MI
January 20, 2018; 2:00 pm, ESPN3		Ohio	L 66–72	11–8 (2–4)	21 – Thompson IV	14 – Thompson IV	3 – Jackson	Convocation Center (1,513); Ypsilanti, MI
January 23, 2018; 7:00 pm, ESPN3		at Buffalo	L 69–83	11–9 (2–5)	20 – Jackson	16 – Thompson IV	4 – Jackson	Alumni Arean (2,966); Amherst, NY
January 27, 2018; 3:30 pm, ESPN3		at Miami (OH)	W 58–48	12–9 (3–5)	15 – Jackson	11 – Thompson IV	5 – Bond	Millett Hall (1,528); Oxford, OH
January 30, 2018; 7:00 pm, ESPN3		Western Michigan; Michigan MAC Trophy	L 57–71	12–10 (3–6)	24 – Thompson IV	18 – Thompson IV	4 – Tied	Convocation Center (2,422); Ypsilanti, MI
February 3, 2018; 12:00 pm, ESPN3		Ball State	W 58–41	13–10 (4–6)	22 – Minnie	14 – Thompson IV	3 – Tied	Convocation Center (1,517); Ypsilanti, MI
February 6, 2018; 7:00 pm, ESPN3		at Kent State	W 71–67	14–10 (5–6)	17 – Jackson	8 – Tied	8 – Jackson	MAC Center (2,373); Kent, OH
February 10, 2018; 4:00 pm, ESPN3		at Bowling Green	L 63–70 ^{OT}	14–11 (5–7)	17 – Minnie	11 – Thompson IV	5 – Jackson	Stroh Center (1,918); Bowling Green, OH
February 13, 2018; 7:00 pm, ESPN3		Miami (OH)	W 58–57	15–11 (6–7)	24 – Minnie	14 – Thompson IV	4 – Bond	Convocation Center (1,331); Ypsilanti, MI
February 17, 2018; 4:30 pm, ESPN3		at Central Michigan; Michigan MAC Trophy	W 72–67	16–11 (7–7)	22 – Thompson IV	14 – Thompson IV	5 – Bond	McGuirk Arena (2,795); Mount Pleasant, MI
February 20, 2018; 7:00 pm, ESPN3		Toledo	W 85–79	17–11 (8–7)	23 – Tied	7 – Thompson IV	10 – Jackson	Convocation Center (984); Ypsilanti, MI
February 24, 2018; 12:00 pm, ESPN3		Northern Illinois	W 82–53	18–11 (9–7)	26 – Minnie	8 – Thompson IV	5 – Tied	Convocation Center (1,821); Ypsilanti, MI
February 27, 2018; 7:00 pm, ESPN3		at Western Michigan; Michigan MAC Trophy	W 74–58	19–11 (10–7)	18 – Minnie	9 – Minnie	8 – Jackson	University Arean (2,610); Kalamazoo, MI
March 2, 2018; 7:00 pm, ESPN3		at Toledo	W 71–69	20–11 (11–7)	25 – Minnie	8 – Tied	6 – Bond	Savage Arena (4,291); Toledo, OH
MAC Tournament
March 8, 2018; 9:00 pm, ESPN3	(3)	(11) Akron; Quarterfinals	W 67–58	21–11	21 – Minnie	14 – Minnie	5 – Jackson	Quicken Loans Arena (2,605); Cleveland, OH
March 9, 2018; 9:00 pm, ESPN3	(3)	(2) Toledo; Semifinals	L 63–64	21–12	26 – Jackson	8 – Bond	5 – Jackson	Quicken Loans Arena (4,625); Cleveland, OH
CIT
March 14, 2018*; 7:00 pm		Niagara; First round	W 83–65	22–12	29 – Minnie	16 – Thompson IV	8 – Bond	Convocation Center (1,138); Ypsilanti, MI
March 19, 2018*; 7:30 pm		at Sam Houston State; Second round	L 62–69	22–13	23 – McAdoo	14 – Thompson IV	7 – Jackson	Bernard G. Johnson Coliseum (322); Huntsville, TX
*Non-conference game. ^{#}Rankings from AP Poll. (#) Tournament seedings in parentheses. All times are in Eastern Time Source.

== Game notes ==
=== Spring Arbor ===
- Education Day
- Game in memory of Mike Radomski
- First game in NCAA Division I 2017–18 basketball season

=== UofM Dearborn ===
- James Thompson IV moved into 2nd place on Eastern Michigan's all-time list for double-doubles with 41.

=== Arkansas State ===
- James Thompson IV eclipsed the career 1,000-point mark
- James Thompson IV moves into 8th place on Eastern Michigan's all-time list for rebounds

=== Oakland ===
- First time since 1985 that Eastern had three players score 20-or-more points in a single game against a Division I opponent (Jackson, Minnie, Thompson IV)

=== Central State ===
- Family Day

== See also ==
- 2016–17 Eastern Michigan Eagles women's basketball team
