= 2017–18 Central Michigan Chippewas men's basketball team =

American college basketball season

2017–18 Central Michigan Chippewas men's basketball

Great Alaska Shootout champions Hugh Durham Classic champions

CIT, Quarterfinals
- Conference: Mid-American Conference
- West Division
- Record: 21–15 (7–11 MAC)
- Head coach: Keno Davis (6th season)
- Assistant coaches: Kevin Gamble; Kyle Gerdeman; Jeff Smith
- Home arena: McGuirk Arena

2017–18 Mid-American Conference men's basketball standings
	Conf.				Overall
Team	W		L	PCT	W		L	PCT
East
Buffalo †	15	–	3	.833	27	–	9	.750
Kent State	9	–	9	.500	17	–	17	.500
Miami (OH)	8	–	10	.444	16	–	18	.471
Bowling Green	7	–	11	.389	16	–	16	.500
Ohio	7	–	11	.389	14	–	17	.452
Akron	6	–	12	.333	14	–	18	.438
West
Toledo	13	–	5	.722	23	–	11	.676
Eastern Michigan	11	–	7	.611	22	–	13	.629
Ball State	10	–	8	.556	19	–	13	.594
Western Michigan	9	–	9	.500	17	–	15	.531
Central Michigan	7	–	11	.389	21	–	15	.583
Northern Illinois	6	–	12	.333	13	–	19	.406
† 2018 MAC tournament winner

The 2017–18 Central Michigan Chippewas men's basketball team represented Central Michigan University during the 2017–18 NCAA Division I men's basketball season. The Chippewas, led by sixth-year head coach Keno Davis, played their home games at McGuirk Arena as members of the West Division of the Mid-American Conference. They finished the season 21–14, 7–11 in MAC play to finish in fifth place in the West Division. They defeated Bowling Green in the first round of the MAC tournament before losing in the quarterfinals to Buffalo. They were invited to the CollegeInsider.com Tournament where they defeated Fort Wayne and Wofford to advance to the quarterfinals where they lost to Liberty.

== Previous season ==
The Chippewas finished the 2016–17 season 16–16, 6–12 in MAC play to finish in last place in the West Division. As the No. 11 seed in the MAC tournament, they lost in the first round to Kent State.

== Offseason ==
=== Recruiting class of 2017 ===
College recruiting information
Name	Hometown	School	Height	Weight	Commit date
A.J. Bullard; PF	The Woodlands, TX	The Woodlands High School	6 ft 9 in (2.06 m)	195 lb (88 kg)	Oct 3, 2016
A.J. Bullard; PF	Recruit ratings: Scout: Rivals: (NR)				
Overall recruit ranking:
Note: In many cases, Scout, Rivals, 247Sports, On3, and ESPN may conflict in their listings of height and weight.; In these cases, the average was taken. ESPN grades are on a 100-point scale.; Sources: "2017 Team Ranking". Rivals.

=== Recruiting class of 2018 ===
College recruiting information (2018)
Name	Hometown	School	Height	Weight	Commit date
P.J. Mitchell; PG	Detroit, MI	Loyola High School	5 ft 9 in (1.75 m)	N/A	
P.J. Mitchell; PG	Recruit ratings: Scout: Rivals: (NR)				
Overall recruit ranking:
Note: In many cases, Scout, Rivals, 247Sports, On3, and ESPN may conflict in their listings of height and weight.; In these cases, the average was taken. ESPN grades are on a 100-point scale.; Sources: "2018 Team Ranking". Rivals.

== Schedule and results ==
Date time, TV	Rank^{#}	Opponent^{#}	Result	Record	Site (attendance) city, state
Exhibition
November 5, 2017*; 1:00 pm		Northwood	W 81–71		McGuirk Arena (1,768); Mount Pleasant, MI
Non-conference regular season
November 10, 2017*; 3:00 pm, CSN		Siena Heights	W 108–48	1–0	McGuirk Arena (2,142); Mount Pleasant, MI
November 13, 2017*; 7:00 pm, BTN		at Michigan	L 65–72	1–1	Crisler Center (8,951); Ann Arbor, MI
November 18, 2017*; 1:00 pm, CSN		Eureka	W 103–68	2–1	McGuirk Arena (1,880); Mount Pleasant, MI
November 22, 2017*; 6:30 pm		vs. Sam Houston State; Great Alaska Shootout quarterfinal	W 71–60	3–1	Alaska Airlines Center (1,579); Anchorage, AK
November 24, 2017*; 9:30 pm		vs. Cal Poly; Great Alaska Shootout semifinal	W 56–53	4–1	Alaska Airlines Center (2,653); Anchorage, AK
November 25, 2017*; 11:59 pm		vs. Cal State Bakersfield; Great Alaska Shootout championship	W 75–72	5–1	Alaska Airlines Arena (3,962); Seattle, WA
December 1, 2017*; 7:00 pm, ESPN3		Jackson State	W 70–63	6–1	McGuirk Arena (2,444); Mount Pleasant, MI
December 5, 2017*; 7:00, ESPN3		Montana State	W 75–48	7–1	McGuirk Arena (2,092); Mount Pleasant, MI
December 9, 2017*; 1:00 pm, ESPN3		Tennessee Tech	W 74–69	8–1	McGuirk Arena (1,956); Mount Pleasant, MI
December 16, 2017*; 2:30 pm		at Southern Utah	L 80–86	8–2	America First Events Center (1,406); Cedar City, UT
December 19, 2017*; 8:00 pm		at UMKC	W 92–86 ^{OT}	9–2	Municipal Auditorium (1,158); Kansas City, MO
December 22, 2017*; 7:00 pm, ESPN3		SIU Edwardsville	W 70–52	10–2	McGuirk Arena (1,664); Mount Pleasant, MI
December 29, 2017*; 7:00 pm, CSN		Lawrence Tech	W 91–73	11–2	McGuirk Arena (1,947); Mount Pleasant, MI
MAC regular season
January 2, 2018; 7:00 pm, ESPN3		Ohio	W 75–50	12–2 (1–0)	McGuirk Arena (1,655); Mount Pleasant, MI
January 6, 2018; 7:00 pm, ESPN3		at Kent State	L 69–85	12–3 (1–1)	Memorial Athletic and Convocation Center (2,217); Kent, OH
January 9, 2018; 7:00 pm, ESPN3		at Eastern Michigan	L 74–79	12–4 (1–2)	Convocation Center (1,623); Ypsilanti, MI
January 13, 2018; 4:30 pm, ESPN3		Toledo	L 82–93	12–5 (1–3)	McGuirk Arena (2,819); Mount Pleasant, MI
January 16, 2018; 7:00 pm, ESPN3		at Ball State	L 76–82	12–6 (1–4)	Worthen Arena (3,702); Muncie, IN
January 20, 2018; 3:30 pm, ESPN3		at Bowling Green	W 84–75	13–6 (2–4)	Stroh Center (3,103); Bowling Green, OH
January 23, 2018; 7:00 pm, ESPN3		Miami (OH)	L 61–70	13–7 (2–5)	McGuirk Arena (2,125); Mount Pleasant, MI
January 27, 2018; 4:30 pm, ESPN3		Kent State	L 76–84	13–8 (2–6)	McGuirk Arena (2,967); Mount Pleasant, MI
January 30, 2018; 7:00 pm, ESPN3		Northern Illinois	W 81–67	14–8 (3–6)	McGuirk Arena (1,820); Mount Pleasant, MI
February 3, 2018; 3:30 pm, ESPN3		at Ohio	W 101–98 ^{OT}	15–8 (4–6)	Convocation Center (8,027); Athens, OH
February 6, 2018; 7:00 pm, ESPN3		Buffalo	L 82–88	15–9 (4–7)	McGuirk Arena (1,979); Mount Pleasant, MI
February 10, 2018; 2:00 pm, ESPN3		at Akron	L 63–69	15–10 (4–8)	James A. Rhodes Arena (2,564); Akron, OH
February 13, 2018; 8:00 pm, ESPN3		at Northern Illinois	W 80–72	16–10 (5–8)	Convocation Center (799); DeKalb, IL
February 17, 2018; 4:30 pm, ESPN3		Eastern Michigan	L 67–72	16–11 (5–9)	McGuirk Arena (2,795); Mount Pleasant, MI
February 20, 2018; 7:00 pm, ESPN3		at Western Michigan	L 81–83 ^{OT}	16–12 (5–10)	University Arena (2,895); Kalamazoo, MI
February 23, 2018; 6:30 pm, ESPN3		at Toledo	L 76–89	16–13 (5–11)	Savage Arena (4,883); Toledo, OH
February 27, 2018; 7:00 pm, ESPN3		Ball State	W 75–51	17–13 (6–11)	McGuirk Arena (1,913); Mount Pleasant, MI
March 3, 2018; 7:00 pm, ESPN3		Western Michigan	W 84–71	18–13 (7–11)	Riepma Arena (150); Midland, MI
MAC tournament
March 5, 2018; 7:00 pm, ESPN3	(8)	(9) Bowling Green; First Round	W 81–77 ^{OT}	19–13	McGuirk Arena (1,910); Mount Pleasant, MI
March 7, 2018; 7:00 pm, ESPN3	(8)	vs. (1) Buffalo; Quarterfinals	L 74–89	19–14	Quicken Loans Arena (2,023); Cleveland, OH
CIT
March 12, 2018*; 12:00 pm, CBSSN		at Fort Wayne; First Round – Hugh Durham Classic	W 94–89	20–14	Memorial Coliseum (1,234); Fort Wayne, IN
March 16, 2018*; 7:00 pm		at Wofford; Second Round	W 98–94	21–14	Jerry Richardson Indoor Stadium (1,448); Spartanburg, SC
March 24, 2018*; 2:00 pm		at Liberty; Quarterfinals	L 71–84	21–15	Vines Center (476); Lynchburg, VA
*Non-conference game. ^{#}Rankings from AP Poll. (#) Tournament seedings in parentheses. All times are in Eastern Time.

== See also ==
- 2017–18 Central Michigan Chippewas women's basketball team
  - The March 3 game against Western Michigan was originally scheduled for March 2, but was rescheduled for the next day and relocated to Northwood University due to the Central Michigan shooting. As a result, this game was closed off to the public.
