= Michael Huger =

American basketball player and coach

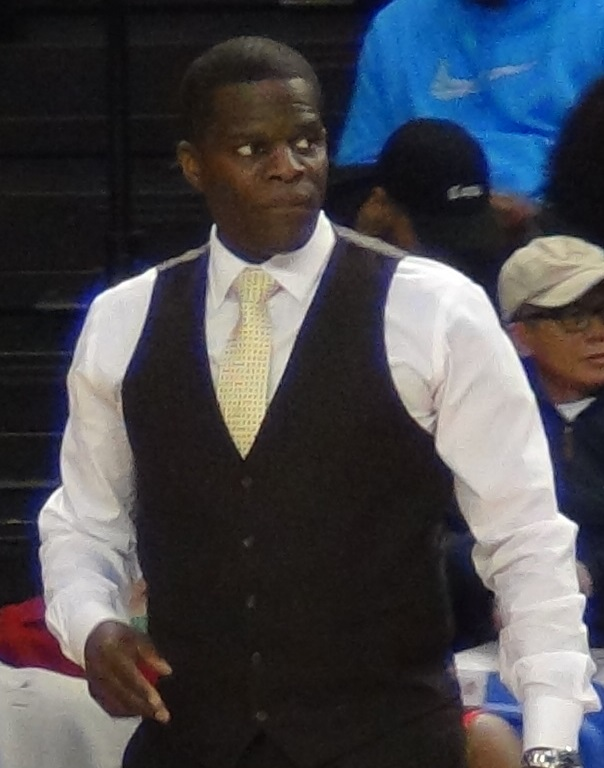
- Huger in 2016

Current position
- Title: Associate head coach
- Team: Temple
- Conference: The American

Biographical details
- Born: June 27, 1970 (age 56); New York City, New York, U.S.

Playing career
- 1989–1993: Bowling Green
- 1993–1994: Turku
- 1994–1995: GOBA Gorinchem
- 1995–1996: Rotterdam
- 1996–1998: Maes Pils Mechelen
- 1998–2000: Antwerpen
- 2000–2001: FLV Athlon Ieper
- 2001–2002: Telindus BC Oostende
- 2002–2005: Euphony Liège
- Position: Guard

Coaching career (HC unless noted)
- 2005–2007: Longwood (assistant)
- 2007–2011: George Mason (assistant)
- 2011–2015: Miami (FL) (assistant)
- 2015–2023: Bowling Green
- 2023–present: Temple (assoc. HC)

Head coaching record
- Overall: 126–125 (.502)

Accomplishments and honors

Championships
- Basketball League Belgium (2000); 2× Belgian Basketball Cup (2000, 2004)

Awards
- 3× Basketball League Belgium All-Star (1999–2001)

Michael Anthony Huger (born June 27, 1970) is an American college basketball coach who is an assistant coach for Temple. Prior to Temple, he was the head coach for his alma mater Bowling Green Falcons team. Huger is a native of New York City.

== Playing career ==
He was a star player at Bowling Green from 1989 to 1993, playing under Coach Jim Larranaga. As a player at Bowling Green, Huger was named second-team all-MAC as a junior and first-team all-MAC as a senior. He is 6th all-time on BG's 3-point FG% list. He made two appearances in the National Invitational Tournament as a player.

After Bowling Green, Huger played professional basketball in Europe from 1993 to 2005, including Finland, Holland and Belgium. He was the Dutch League MVP in 1996, scoring 25.3 points and adding 5.8 assists and later was First-Team All-Belgium for 2000 and 2004—both seasons in which his teams won the Belgium Cup.

== Coaching career ==
Upon finishing his playing career, Huger began his coaching career at Longwood University with Mike Gillian, who had been an assistant at Bowling Green under Larranaga. After two years with the Lancers, Huger re-joined Larranaga at George Mason University as an assistant. The Patriots made the post-season in each season Huger coached there, including two NCAA tournament bids. The Patriots also won a regular-season Colonial Athletic Association title and a CAA tournament title.

When Larranaga moved to the University of Miami, Huger followed him as an assistant. The Hurricanes won the Atlantic Coast Conference regular-season and tournament title in 2012–13 and advanced to the Sweet 16 of the NCAA Basketball tournament. They also qualified for the NIT twice in his four years in Coral Gables, losing in the final of the 2015 tournament.

In 2012–13, Huger was the Hurricane's defensive coordinator. The team was nationally ranked No. 39 in scoring defense (60.6) and No. 48 in field goal percentage defense (40.0).

Huger was hired as the head coach of the Bowling Green State University men's basketball team on April 15, 2015. After spending his first three years rebuilding the Falcon program, Huger had his best year yet as a head coach. In 2018–19, Huger guided the Falcons to a 22–12 season, including finishing 3rd in the Mid-American Conference and going to the MAC Championship Game, despite the fact that his team had been picked to finish last in the MAC in the pre-season polls. That year, they also set a new record for the most home wins in the Stroh Center era, finishing with a 14–2 record at home. The highlight of the season was the 92–88 upset win over a ranked Buffalo team on February 1 in front of a sold-out crowd on national television. It was the first truly iconic win of the Stroh Center's short history, and it set the tone for the rest of the season.

On February 25, 2020, Huger led Bowling Green to their second straight season with at least 20 wins, a first for the school since 1947–48 and 1948–49.

After three consecutive seasons posting win totals under 15, he was fired on March 5, 2023. Huger reunited with Adam Fisher (the two coached together on the staff at Miami) and joined the Temple basketball staff on March 31, 2023.

== Head coaching record ==
Record table
Season	Team	Overall	Conference	Standing	Postseason
Bowling Green Falcons (Mid-American Conference) (2015–2023)
2015–16	Bowling Green	16–18	5–13	6th (East)	
2016–17	Bowling Green	13–19	7–11	5th (East)	
2017–18	Bowling Green	16–16	7–11	T–4th (East)	
2018–19	Bowling Green	22–12	12–6	2nd (East)	
2019–20	Bowling Green	21–10	12–6	2nd (East)	Canceled
2020–21	Bowling Green	14–12	10–8	5th	CBI First Round
2021–22	Bowling Green	13–18	6–14	T–9th	
2022–23	Bowling Green	11–20	5–13	T–9th	
Bowling Green:		126–125 (.502)	64–82 (.438)		
Total:		126–125 (.502)			
National champion Postseason invitational champion Conference regular season champion Conference regular season and conference tournament champion Division regular season champion Division regular season and conference tournament champion Conference tournament champion
