= 2017–18 Toledo Rockets men's basketball team =

American college basketball season

2017–18 Toledo Rockets men's basketball

MAC West division champions
- Conference: Mid-American Conference
- West Division
- Record: 23–11 (13–5 MAC)
- Head coach: Tod Kowalczyk (8th season)
- Assistant coaches: Jason Kaslow; Jeff Massey; Kyle Barlow
- Home arena: Savage Arena

2017–18 Mid-American Conference men's basketball standings
	Conf.				Overall
Team	W		L	PCT	W		L	PCT
East
Buffalo †	15	–	3	.833	27	–	9	.750
Kent State	9	–	9	.500	17	–	17	.500
Miami (OH)	8	–	10	.444	16	–	18	.471
Bowling Green	7	–	11	.389	16	–	16	.500
Ohio	7	–	11	.389	14	–	17	.452
Akron	6	–	12	.333	14	–	18	.438
West
Toledo	13	–	5	.722	23	–	11	.676
Eastern Michigan	11	–	7	.611	22	–	13	.629
Ball State	10	–	8	.556	19	–	13	.594
Western Michigan	9	–	9	.500	17	–	15	.531
Central Michigan	7	–	11	.389	21	–	15	.583
Northern Illinois	6	–	12	.333	13	–	19	.406
† 2018 MAC tournament winner

The 2017–18 Toledo Rockets men's basketball team represented the University of Toledo during the 2017–18 NCAA Division I men's basketball season. The Rockets, led by eighth-year head coach Tod Kowalczyk, played their home games at Savage Arena, as members of the West Division of the Mid-American Conference. With a win over Northern Illinois on February 27, 2018, the Rockets clinched the MAC West division championship. They finished the season 23–11, 13–5 in MAC play to win the MAC West division championship. As the No. 2 seed in the MAC tournament, they defeated Miami and Eastern Michigan before losing to Buffalo in the tournament championship. Despite winning 23 games, they did not participate in a postseason tournament.

== Previous season ==
The Rockets finished the 2016–17 season 17–17, 9–9 in MAC play to finish in third place in the West Division. As the No. 7 seed in the MAC tournament. they defeated Bowling Green in the first round to advance to the quarterfinals, where they lost to Ohio. They received an invitation to the College Basketball Invitational, where they lost in the first round to George Washington.

== Offseason ==
=== Recruiting class of 2017 ===
College recruiting
Name	Hometown	School	Height	Weight	Commit date
Logan Hill; PF	Massillon, OH	Jackson High School	6 ft 7 in (2.01 m)	205 lb (93 kg)	Jun 25, 2016
Logan Hill; PF	Recruit ratings: Scout: Rivals: (NR)				
Marreon Jackson; PG	Cleveland, OH	Garfield Heights High School	6 ft 0 in (1.83 m)	160 lb (73 kg)	Feb 15, 2016
Marreon Jackson; PG	Recruit ratings: Scout: Rivals: (NR)				
Overall recruit ranking:
Note: In many cases, Scout, Rivals, 247Sports, On3, and ESPN may conflict in their listings of height and weight.; In these cases, the average was taken. ESPN grades are on a 100-point scale.; Sources: "2017 Team Ranking". Rivals.

== Schedule and results ==
Date time, TV	Rank^{#}	Opponent^{#}	Result	Record	Site (attendance) city, state
Exhibition
October 24, 2017*; 8:00 pm		at Findlay	L 86–89		Croy Gymnasium (1,215); Findlay, OH
November 4, 2017*; 2:30 pm		Trine	W 116–59		Savage Arena; Toledo, OH
Non-conference regular season
November 11, 2017*; 7:00 pm, ESPN3		Saint Joseph's	W 98–87	1–0	Savage Arena (3,609); Toledo, OH
November 14, 2017*; 7:00 pm, ESPN3		Ohio Northern	W 72–62	2–0	Savage Arena (3,584); Toledo, OH
November 18, 2017*; 7:00 pm, ESPN3		Oakland; Hoophall Miami Invitational	W 87–74	3–0	Savage Arena (4,436); Toledo, OH
November 22, 2017*; 7:00 pm, ACCN Extra		at Syracuse; Hoophall Miami Invitational	L 64–72	3–1	Carrier Dome (16,237); Syracuse, NY
November 24, 2017*; 4:00 pm		at Cornell	L 70–77	3–2	Newman Arena (704); Ithaca, NY
November 28, 2017*; 8:00 pm, Jayhawk TV		at No. 2 Kansas; Hoophall Miami Invitational	L 58–96	3–3	Allen Fieldhouse (16,300); Lawrence, KS
December 2, 2017*; 7:00 pm, ESPN3		Texas Southern; Hoophall Miami Invitational	W 71–69	4–3	Savage Arena (3,199); Toledo, OH
December 6, 2017*; 7:00 pm, WADL/ESPN3		at Detroit	W 89–86	5–3	Calihan Hall (1,218); Detroit, MI
December 9, 2017*; 7:00 pm, ESPN3		Marshall	L 87–93	5–4	Savage Arena (4,369); Toledo, OH
December 16, 2017*; 2:00 pm, ESPN3		Wright State	L 69–77	5–5	Savage Arena (3,932); Toledo, OH
December 20, 2017*; 7:00 pm, ESPN3		Jackson State	W 83–57	6–5	Savage Arena (3,410); Toledo, OH
December 23, 2017*; 2:00 pm, ESPN3		at Cleveland State	W 77–62	7–5	Wolstein Center (1,597); Cleveland, OH
December 29, 2017*; 4:00 pm		at Penn	W 85–72	8–5	Palestra (2,316); Philadelphia, PA
MAC regular season
January 2, 2018; 7:00 pm, CBSSN		at Buffalo	L 94–104	8–6 (0–1)	Alumni Arena (1,100); Amherst, NY
January 5, 2018; 6:30 pm, CBSSN		Akron	W 67–65	9–6 (1–1)	Savage Arena (4,155); Toledo, OH
January 9, 2018; 7:00 pm, ESPN3		Western Michigan	W 84–61	10–6 (2–1)	Savage Arena (3,594); Toledo, OH
January 13, 2018; 4:30 pm, ESPN3		at Central Michigan	W 93–82	11–6 (3–1)	McGuirk Arena (2,819); Mount Pleasant, MI
January 16, 2018; 7:00 pm, ESPN3		at Ohio	W 91–57	12–6 (4–1)	Convocation Center (6,040); Athens, OH
January 20, 2018; 7:00 pm, ESPN3		Kent State	W 72–65	13–6 (5–1)	Savage Arena (4,970); Toledo, OH
January 23, 2018; 7:00 pm, ESPN3		at Western Michigan	W 85–81	14–6 (6–1)	University Arena (2,014); Kalamazoo, MI
January 27, 2018; 7:00 pm, ESPN3		Bowling Green	W 101–75	15–6 (7–1)	Savage Arena (6,812); Toledo, OH
January 30, 2018; 7:00 pm, ESPN3		Ball State	L 63–75	15–7 (7–2)	Savage Arena (4,227); Toledo, OH
February 3, 2018; 12:00 pm, CBSSN		at Akron	W 77–56	16–7 (8–2)	James A. Rhodes Arena (2,584); Akron, OH
February 6, 2018; 7:00 pm, ESPN3		Northern Illinois	W 82–77	17–7 (9–2)	Savage Arena (3,861); Toledo, OH
February 9, 2018; 6:00 pm, CBSSN		at Miami (OH)	W 73–67	18–7 (10–2)	Millett Hall (3,525); Oxford, OH
February 13, 2018; 7:30 pm, ESPN3		Ohio	W 82–74	19–7 (11–2)	Savage Arena (4,502); Toledo, OH
February 17, 2018; 2:00 pm, ESPN3		at Ball State	L 71–99	19–8 (11–3)	Worthen Arena (4,824); Muncie, IN
February 20, 2018; 7:00 pm, ESPN3		at Eastern Michigan	L 79–85	19–9 (11–4)	Convocation Center (984); Ypsilanti, MI
February 23, 2018; 6:30 pm, CBSSN		Central Michigan	W 89–76	20–9 (12–4)	Savage Arena (4,883); Toledo, OH
February 27, 2018; 7:00 pm, ESPN3		at Northern Illinois	W 97–67	21–9 (13–4)	Convocation Center (869); DeKalb, IL
March 2, 2018; 7:00 pm, ESPN3		Eastern Michigan	L 69–71	21–10 (13–5)	Savage Arena (4,291); Toledo, OH
MAC tournament
March 8, 2018; 6:30 pm, ESPN3	(2)	vs. (7) Miami (OH); Quarterfinals	W 71–69	22–10	Quicken Loans Arena; Cleveland, OH
March 9, 2018; 9:00 pm, CBSSN	(2)	vs. (3) Eastern Michigan; Semifinals	W 64–63	23–10	Quicken Loans Arena (4,625); Cleveland, OH
March 10, 2018; 7:00 pm, ESPN2	(2)	vs. (1) Buffalo; Championship game	L 66–76	23–11	Quicken Loans Arena (5,633); Cleveland, OH
*Non-conference game. ^{#}Rankings from AP Poll. (#) Tournament seedings in parentheses. All times are in Eastern Time.

== See also ==
- 2017–18 Toledo Rockets women's basketball team
