= 2017–18 Bowling Green Falcons men's basketball team =

American college basketball season

2017–18 Bowling Green Falcons men's basketball
- Conference: Mid-American Conference
- East Division
- Record: 16–16 (7–11 MAC)
- Head coach: Michael Huger (3rd season)
- Assistant coaches: Anthony Stacey; Mike Summey; Kevin Noon
- Home arena: Stroh Center

2017–18 Mid-American Conference men's basketball standings
	Conf.				Overall
Team	W		L	PCT	W		L	PCT
East
Buffalo †	15	–	3	.833	27	–	9	.750
Kent State	9	–	9	.500	17	–	17	.500
Miami (OH)	8	–	10	.444	16	–	18	.471
Bowling Green	7	–	11	.389	16	–	16	.500
Ohio	7	–	11	.389	14	–	17	.452
Akron	6	–	12	.333	14	–	18	.438
West
Toledo	13	–	5	.722	23	–	11	.676
Eastern Michigan	11	–	7	.611	22	–	13	.629
Ball State	10	–	8	.556	19	–	13	.594
Western Michigan	9	–	9	.500	17	–	15	.531
Central Michigan	7	–	11	.389	21	–	15	.583
Northern Illinois	6	–	12	.333	13	–	19	.406
† 2018 MAC tournament winner

The 2017–18 Bowling Green Falcons men's basketball team represented Bowling Green State University during the 2017–18 NCAA Division I men's basketball season. The Falcons, led by third-year head coach Michael Huger, played their home games at the Stroh Center as members of the East Division of the Mid-American Conference.

== Previous season ==
The Falcons finished the 2016–17 season 13–19, 7–11 in MAC play to finish in a tie for eighth place. As the No. 10 seed in the MAC tournament, they lost in the first round to Toledo.

== Offseason ==
=== Recruiting class of 2017 ===
College recruiting information
Name	Hometown	School	Height	Weight	Commit date
Derek Koch #67 PF	West Salem, OH	Northwestern High School	6 ft 8 in (2.03 m)	225 lb (102 kg)	Sep 18, 2016
Derek Koch #67 PF	Recruit ratings: Scout: Rivals: (73)				
Daeqwon Plowden; SF	Philadelphia, PA	Mastery Charter School	6 ft 5 in (1.96 m)	N/A	Sep 7, 2016
Daeqwon Plowden; SF	Recruit ratings: Scout: Rivals: (NR)				
Joniya Gadson; PF	Fort Lauderdale, FL	Dillard High School	6 ft 11 in (2.11 m)	N/A	Oct 2, 2016
Joniya Gadson; PF	Recruit ratings: Scout: Rivals: (NR)				
Overall recruit ranking:
Note: In many cases, Scout, Rivals, 247Sports, On3, and ESPN may conflict in their listings of height and weight.; In these cases, the average was taken. ESPN grades are on a 100-point scale.; Sources: "2017 Team Ranking". Rivals.

== Schedule and results ==
Date time, TV	Rank^{#}	Opponent^{#}	Result	Record	High points	High rebounds	High assists	Site (attendance) city, state
Exhibition
November 2, 2017*; 6:00 pm		Capital	W 83–53		21 – Frye	13 – Wiggins	5 – Turner	Stroh Center (1,310); Bowling Green, OH
Non-conference regular season
November 10, 2017*; 7:00 pm		at Drexel	W 78–69	1–0	33 – Turner	8 – Wiggins	7 – Turner	Daskalakis Athletic Center (2,504); Philadelphia, PA
November 13, 2017*; 7:00 pm, ESPN3		South Dakota	L 79–88	1–1	23 – Frye	14 – Koch	5 – Turner	Stroh Center (1,237); Bowling Green, OH
November 18, 2017*; 6:00 pm, ESPN3		Florida Gulf Coast	W 83–80	2–1	20 – Turner	11 – Koch	3 – Fox	Stroh Center (2,440); Bowling Green, OH
November 20, 2017*; 7:00 pm		Lake Erie; Creek Classic Opener	W 109–106 ^{OT}	3–1	25 – Wiggins	10 – Uju	8 – Caldwell	Stroh Center (1,505); Bowling Green, OH
November 24, 2017*; 5:00 pm		vs. USC Upstate; Creek Classic	W 83–74	4–1	20 – Frye/Wiggins	12 – Wiggins	7 – Caldwell	Pope Convocation Center (1,083); Buies Creek, NC
November 26, 2017*; 2:00 pm		at Campbell; Creek Classic	W 78–72	5–1	20 – Caldwell	7 – Wiggins	5 – Caldwell	Pope Convocation Center (1,208); Buies Creek, NC
November 26, 2017*; 1:00 pm		vs. Abilene Christian; Creek Classic	L 83–88	5–2	25 – Caldwell	8 – Wiggins	4 – Caldwell	Pope Convocation Center (3,095); Buies Creek, NC
November 29, 2017*; 8:00 pm, ESPN3		San Jose State	W 85—79	6—2	27 – Turner	12 – Wiggins	5 – Caldwell	Stroh Center (1,635); Bowling Green, OH
December 2, 2017*; 6:00 pm		at Norfolk State; Spartan Showcase	W 92—77	7—2	28 – Frye	8 – Koch	7 – Caldwell	Joseph G. Echols Memorial Hall (1,378); Norfolk, VA
December 5, 2017*; 7:00 pm, ESPN3		Evansville	L 76—91	7—3	21 – Turner	11 – Wiggins	4 – Frye	Stroh Center (1,489); Bowling Green, OH
December 9, 2017*; 7:00 pm		at Old Dominion	L 46–88	7–4	17 – Turner	6 – Cummings/Wiggins	2 – Fox/Turner	Ted Constant Convocation Center (5,418); Norfolk, VA
December 21, 2017*; 7:00 pm, Spectrum Sports		at Green Bay	W 81–78 ^{OT}	8–4	21 – Caldwell/Turner	16 – Wiggins	3 – Lillard/Turner	Resch Center; Green Bay, WI
December 28, 2017*; 5:50 pm		Lourdes	W 97–56	9–4	15 – Caldwell	8 – Wiggins	4 – Turner	Stroh Center (1,927); Bowling Green, OH
MAC regular season
January 2, 2018; 7:00 pm, ESPN3		Miami (OH)	L 72–77	9–5 (0–1)	18 – Wiggins	5 – 4 players tied	3 – Caldwell	Stroh Center (1,524); Bowling Green, OH
January 6, 2018; 12:00 pm, ESPN3		at Eastern Michigan	W 75–71 ^{OT}	10–5 (1–1)	20 – Lillard	12 – Lillard	6 – Caldwell	Convocation Center (1,253); Ypsilanti, MI
January 9, 2018; 7:00 pm, ESPN3		Northern Illinois	W 66–57	11–5 (2–1)	15 – Wiggins	15 – Wiggins	4 – Lillard	Stroh Center (2,013); Bowling Green, OH
January 13, 2018; 2:00 pm, ESPN3		at Akron	L 78–80	11–6 (2–2)	30 – Turner	12 – Wiggins	2 – Caldwell/Koch	James A. Rhodes Arena (3,204); Akron, OH
January 16, 2018; 7:00 pm, ESPN3		at Miami (OH)	W 81–70	12–6 (3–2)	22 – Wiggins	15 – Wiggins	5 – Wiggins	Millett Hall (996); Oxford, OH
January 20, 2018; 3:30 pm, ESPN3		Central Michigan	L 75–84	12–7 (3–3)	16 – Caldwell	11 – Wiggins	4 – Caldwell/Frye	Stroh Center (3,103); Bowling Green, OH
January 23, 2018; 8:00 pm, ESPN3		at Northern Illinois	L 62–93	12–8 (3–4)	13 – Caldwell	8 – Wiggins	3 – Turner	Convocation Center (883); DeKalb, IL
January 27, 2018; 7:00 pm, ESPN3		at Toledo	L 75–101	12–9 (3–5)	13 – Frye/Koch/Turner	4 – Koch/Plowden/Turner	6 – Turner	Savage Arena (6,812); Toledo, OH
January 30, 2018; 7:00 pm, ESPN3		Ohio	W 66–50	13–9 (4–5)	18 – Wiggins	11 – Wiggins	3 – Frye	Stroh Center (1,540); Bowling Green, OH
February 3, 2018; 3:30 pm, ESPN3		Kent State	W 70–62	14–9 (5–5)	20 – Turner	9 – Wiggins	4 – Caldwell	Stroh Center (3,540); Bowling Green, OH
February 6, 2018; 7:00 pm, ESPN3		at Ball State	L 56–59	14–10 (5–6)	15 – Lillard	10 – Koch/Lillard	2 – 6 players tied	Worthen Arena (3,245); Muncie, IN
February 10, 2018; 4:00 pm, ESPN3		Eastern Michigan	W 70–63 ^{OT}	15–10 (6–6)	17 – Wiggins	15 – Wiggins	5 – Lillard/Turner	Stroh Center (1,918); Bowling Green, OH
February 13, 2018; 7:00 pm, ESPN3		Western Michigan	W 83–81	16–10 (7–6)	29 – Turner	12 – Wiggins	3 – Frye/Lillard	Stroh Center (1,421); Bowling Green, OH
February 16, 2018; 7:00 pm, ESPNU		at Buffalo	L 82–95	16–11 (7–7)	23 – Turner	15 – Wiggins	3 – Frye/Lillard	Alumni Arena (5,707); Amherst, NY
February 20, 2018; 7:00 pm, ESPN3		Akron	L 79–81	16–12 (7–8)	24 – Frye	12 – Wiggins	6 – Turner	Stroh Center (1,540); Bowling Green, OH
February 24, 2018; 6:00 pm, CBSSN		at Kent State	L 63–64	16–13 (7–9)	17 – Turner	13 – Wiggins	2 – 4 players tied	Memorial Athletic and Convocation Center (5,022); Kent, OH
February 27, 2018; 7:00 pm, ESPN3		at Ohio	L 59–75	16–14 (7–10)	18 – Wiggins	15 – Wiggins	3 – Frye	Convocation Center (6,108); Athens, OH
March 2, 2018; 6:00 pm, ESPNU		Buffalo	L 70–100	16–15 (7–11)	21 – Turner	10 – Wiggins	3 – Caldwell	Stroh Center (1,924); Bowling Green, OH
MAC tournament
March 5, 2018*; 7:00 pm	(9)	at (8) Central Michigan; First round	L 77–81	16–16	17 – Lillard/Turner	12 – Wiggins	5 – Turner	McGuirk Arena (1,910); Mount Pleasant, MI
*Non-conference game. ^{#}Rankings from AP Poll. (#) Tournament seedings in parentheses. All times are in Eastern Time.

== See also ==
2017–18 Bowling Green Falcons women's basketball team
