= 2017–18 Kent State Golden Flashes men's basketball team =

American college basketball season

2017–18 Kent State Golden Flashes men's basketball
- Conference: Mid-American Conference
- East Division
- Record: 17–17 (9–9 MAC)
- Head coach: Rob Senderoff (7th season)
- Assistant coaches: Eric Haut; Bobby Steinburg; Akeem Miskdeen
- Home arena: MAC Center

2017–18 Mid-American Conference men's basketball standings
	Conf.				Overall
Team	W		L	PCT	W		L	PCT
East
Buffalo †	15	–	3	.833	27	–	9	.750
Kent State	9	–	9	.500	17	–	17	.500
Miami (OH)	8	–	10	.444	16	–	18	.471
Bowling Green	7	–	11	.389	16	–	16	.500
Ohio	7	–	11	.389	14	–	17	.452
Akron	6	–	12	.333	14	–	18	.438
West
Toledo	13	–	5	.722	23	–	11	.676
Eastern Michigan	11	–	7	.611	22	–	13	.629
Ball State	10	–	8	.556	19	–	13	.594
Western Michigan	9	–	9	.500	17	–	15	.531
Central Michigan	7	–	11	.389	21	–	15	.583
Northern Illinois	6	–	12	.333	13	–	19	.406
† 2018 MAC tournament winner

The 2017–18 Kent State Golden Flashes men's basketball team represented Kent State University during the 2017–18 NCAA Division I men's basketball season. The Golden Flashes, led by seventh-year head coach Rob Senderoff, played their home games at the Memorial Athletic and Convocation Center, also known as the MAC Center, as members of the East Division of the Mid-American Conference. They finished the season 17–17, 9–9 in MAC play to finish in second place in the MAC East division. They defeated Northern Illinois and Ball State in the MAC tournament before losing to Buffalo in the semifinals.

== Previous season ==
The Golden Flashes finished the 2016–17 season 22–14, 10–8 in MAC play to finish fourth in the MAC East division. As the No. 6 seed in the MAC tournament, the Flashes defeated Central Michigan, Buffalo, Ohio, and Akron to win the tournament for the first time since 2008. As a result, the Flashes received the conference's automatic bid to the NCAA tournament as the No. 14 seed in the South region. In the First Round, they lost to UCLA.

== Offseason ==
=== 2017 recruiting class ===
College recruiting information
Name	Hometown	School	Height	Weight	Commit date
B.J. Dulling; SF	Newark, OH	Newark High School	6 ft 6 in (1.98 m)	200 lb (91 kg)	Oct 29, 2015
B.J. Dulling; SF	Recruit ratings: Scout: Rivals: (NR)				
Overall recruit ranking:
Note: In many cases, Scout, Rivals, 247Sports, On3, and ESPN may conflict in their listings of height and weight.; In these cases, the average was taken. ESPN grades are on a 100-point scale.; Sources: "2017 Team Ranking". Rivals.

== Schedule and results ==
Date time, TV	Rank^{#}	Opponent^{#}	Result	Record	Site (attendance) city, state
Exhibition
Nov 3, 2017*; 6:00 pm, ESPN3		College of Wooster	W 86–65		MAC Center; Kent, OH
Non-conference regular season
Nov 11, 2017*; 9:00 pm, ESPN3		vs. Youngstown State; Northeast Ohio Coaches vs. Cancer	W 111–78	1–0	James A. Rhodes Arena (2,434); Akron, OH
Nov 16, 2017*; 7:00 pm, ESPN3		Ohio Christian	W 90–45	2–0	MAC Center (2,440); Kent, OH
Nov 19, 2017*; 3:00 pm, ESPN3		Mississippi Valley State	W 80–67	3–0	MAC Center (2,005); Kent, OH
Nov 21, 2017*; 7:00 pm, ESPN3		Southeastern Louisiana	L 66–70	3–1	MAC Center (1,872); Kent, OH
Nov 24, 2017*; 7:30 pm		vs. Valparaiso; Savannah Invitational	L 67–77	3–2	Savannah Civic Center; Savannah, GA
Nov 25, 2017*; 5:00 pm		vs. Loyola–Chicago; Savannah Invitational	L 60–75	3–3	Savannah Civic Center; Savannah, GA
Nov 29, 2017*; 8:15 pm		at Norfolk State	W 79–70	4–3	Joseph G. Echols Memorial Hall (1,825); Norfolk, VA
Dec 2, 2017*; 7:00 pm, ESPN3		Cleveland State	W 72–62	5–3	MAC Center (2,511); Kent, OH
Dec 6, 2017*; 7:00 pm, FS1		at No. 13 Xavier	L 70–96	5–4	Cintas Center (10,292); Cincinnati, OH
Dec 9, 2017*; 7:00 pm, ESPN3		at Wright State	L 54–63	5–5	Nutter Center (3,448); Fairborn, OH
Dec 18, 2017*; 7:00 pm, ESPN3		Northeastern	L 69–81	5–6	MAC Center (1,963); Kent, OH
Dec 21, 2017*; 7:00 pm, ESPN3		Oregon State	W 79–78	6–6	MAC Center (3,279); Kent, OH
Dec 28, 2017*; 7:00 pm, ESPN3		at Albany	L 68–78	6–7	SEFCU Arena (2,579); Albany, NY
MAC regular season
Jan 2, 2018; 7:00 pm, ESPN3		at Northern Illinois	L 61–75	6–8 (0–1)	Convocation Center (918); DeKalb, IL
Jan 6, 2018; 7:00 pm, ESPN3		Central Michigan	W 85–69	7–8 (1–1)	MAC Center (2,217); Kent, OH
Jan 9, 2018; 7:00 pm, ESPN3		at Miami (OH)	L 69–80	7–9 (1–2)	Millett Hall (884); Oxford, OH
Jan 12, 2018; 7:00 pm, CBSSN		Ohio	W 70–69	8–9 (2–2)	MAC Center (2,114); Kent, OH
Jan 16, 2018; 7:00 pm, ESPN3		Western Michigan	W 73–71	9–9 (3–2)	MAC Center (2,585); Kent, OH
Jan 20, 2018; 7:00 pm, ESPN3		at Toledo	L 65–72	9–10 (3–3)	Savage Arena (4,970); Toledo, OH
Jan 23, 2018; 7:00 pm, ESPN3		Ball State	W 88–80 ^{OT}	10–10 (4–3)	MAC Center (2,430); Kent, OH
Jan 27, 2018; 4:30 pm, ESPN3		at Central Michigan	W 84–76	11–10 (5–3)	McGuirk Arena (2,967); Mount Pleasant, MI
Jan 30, 2018; 7:00 pm, ESPN3		Buffalo	W 82–79	12–10 (6–3)	MAC Center (2,877); Kent, OH
Feb 3, 2018; 3:30 pm, ESPN3		at Bowling Green	L 62–70	12–11 (6–4)	Stroh Center (3,540); Bowling Green, OH
Feb 6, 2018; 7:00 pm, ESPN3		Eastern Michigan	L 67–71	12–12 (6–5)	MAC Center (2,373); Kent, OH
Feb 10, 2018; 2:00 pm, ESPNU		at Ball State	L 68–87	12–13 (6–6)	Worthen Arena (4,105); Muncie, IN
Feb 13, 2018; 7:00 pm, ESPN3		at Buffalo	L 72–84	12–14 (6–7)	Alumni Arena (3,707); Amherst, NY
Feb 17, 2018; 2:00 pm, CBSSN		Akron	W 78–68	13–14 (7–7)	MAC Center (6,055); Kent, OH
Feb 20, 2018; 7:00 pm, ESPN3		at Ohio	L 76–88	13–15 (7–8)	Convocation Center (6,339); Athens, OH
Feb 24, 2018; 6:00 pm, CBSSN		Bowling Green	W 64–63	14–15 (8–8)	MAC Center (5,022); Kent, OH
Feb 27, 2018; 7:00 pm, ESPN3		Miami (OH)	W 90–83 ^{OT}	15–15 (9–8)	MAC Center (3,074); Kent, OH
Mar 2, 2018; 7:00 pm, ESPN3		at Akron	L 65–67	15–16 (9–9)	James A. Rhodes Arena (4,349); Akron, OH
MAC tournament
Mar 5, 2018; 7:00 pm, ESPN3	(5)	(12) Northern Illinois; First round	W 61–59	16–16	MAC Center (2,024); Kent, OH
Mar 8, 2018; 2:30 pm, BCSN/ESPN3	(5)	vs. (4) Ball State; Quarterfinals	W 76–73	17–16	Quicken Loans Arena (2,023); Cleveland, OH
Mar 9, 2018; 6:30 pm, CBSSN	(5)	vs. (1) Buffalo; Semifinals	L 61–78	17–17	Quicken Loans Arena (4,625); Cleveland, OH
*Non-conference game. ^{#}Rankings from AP Poll. (#) Tournament seedings in parentheses. S=South Region. All times are in Eastern Time.

== See also ==
- 2017–18 Kent State Golden Flashes women's basketball team
