= 2017–18 Ball State Cardinals men's basketball team =

American college basketball season

2017–18 Ball State Cardinals men's basketball
- Conference: Mid-American Conference
- West Division
- Record: 19–13 (10–8 MAC)
- Head coach: James Whitford (5th season)
- Assistant coaches: Jason Grunkemeyer; Danny Peters; Brian Thornton
- Home arena: Worthen Arena

2017–18 Mid-American Conference men's basketball standings
	Conf.				Overall
Team	W		L	PCT	W		L	PCT
East
Buffalo †	15	–	3	.833	27	–	9	.750
Kent State	9	–	9	.500	17	–	17	.500
Miami (OH)	8	–	10	.444	16	–	18	.471
Bowling Green	7	–	11	.389	16	–	16	.500
Ohio	7	–	11	.389	14	–	17	.452
Akron	6	–	12	.333	14	–	18	.438
West
Toledo	13	–	5	.722	23	–	11	.676
Eastern Michigan	11	–	7	.611	22	–	13	.629
Ball State	10	–	8	.556	19	–	13	.594
Western Michigan	9	–	9	.500	17	–	15	.531
Central Michigan	7	–	11	.389	21	–	15	.583
Northern Illinois	6	–	12	.333	13	–	19	.406
† 2018 MAC tournament winner

The 2017–18 Ball State Cardinals men's basketball team represented Ball State University during the 2017–18 NCAA Division I men's basketball season. The Cardinals, led by fifth-year head coach James Whitford, played their home games at Worthen Arena as members of the West Division of the Mid-American Conference. They finished the season 19–13, 10–8 to finish in third place in the MAC West division. They lost in the quarterfinals of the MAC tournament to Kent State.

== Previous season ==
The Cardinals finished the 2016–17 season 21–13, 11–7 in MAC play to finish in a tie for the West Division championship. They lost to Akron in the semifinals of the MAC tournament. They were invited to the CollegeInsider.com Tournament where they lost to Fort Wayne in the first round.

== Schedule and results ==
Date time, TV	Rank^{#}	Opponent^{#}	Result	Record	Site (attendance) city, state
Exhibition
Nov 6, 2017*; 7:00 pm		Saint Francis (IN)	W 91–67		Worthen Arena (1,536); Muncie, IN
Non-conference regular season
Nov 10, 2017*; 7:00 pm, Spectrum Sports		at Dayton	W 78–77	0–1	UD Arena (13,350); Dayton, OH
Nov 15, 2017*; 8:00 pm, FSOK+		at Oklahoma	W 108–69	0–2	Lloyd Noble Center (7,242); Norman, OK
Nov 17, 2017*; 7:00 pm, ESPN3		Stony Brook	W 87–76	1–2	Worthen Arena (3,502); Muncie, IN
Nov 19, 2017*; 9:00 pm, P12N		at Oregon	L 71–95	1–3	Matthew Knight Arena (6,916); Eugene, OR
Nov 22, 2017*; 7:00 pm		at Bucknell	L 83–87	1–4	Sojka Pavilion (2,217); Lewisburg, PA
Nov 25, 2017*; 1:00 pm, ESPN3		at Indiana State	W 93–85	2–4	Hulman Center (3,274); Terre Haute, IN
Nov 28, 2017*; 2:00 pm, ESPN3		Oakland City	W 81–57	3–4	Worthen Arena (2,410); Muncie, IN
Dec 2, 2017*; 2:00 pm, ESPN3		IUPUI	W 83–64	4–4	Worthen Arena (3,505); Muncie, IN
Dec 5, 2017*; 7:00 pm, ACCN Extra		at No. 9 Notre Dame	W 80–77	5–4	Edmund P. Joyce Center (8,891); South Bend, IN
Dec 9, 2017*; 2:00 pm, ESPN3		Valparaiso	W 71–70	6–4	Worthen Arena (5,009); Muncie, IN
Dec 19, 2017*; 7:00 pm, ESPN3		North Florida	W 79–65	7–4	Worthen Arena (3,018); Muncie, IN
Dec 22, 2017*; 7:00 pm, ESPN3		Jackson State	W 70–54	8–4	Worthen Arena (3,129); Muncie, IN
Dec 29, 2017*; 7:00 pm, ESPN3		Florida A&M	W 76–54	9–4	Worthen Arena (2,902); Muncie, IN
MAC regular season
Jan 2, 2018; 7:00 pm, ESPN3		Eastern Michigan	W 72–62	10–4 (1–0)	Worthen Arena (3,025); Muncie, IN
Jan 6, 2018; 2:00 pm, ESPN3		at Buffalo	L 63–83	10–5 (1–1)	Worthen Arena (3,622); Muncie, IN
Jan 9, 2018; 7:00 pm, ESPN3		at Ohio	W 75–68	11–5 (2–1)	Worthen Arena (4,892); Muncie, IN
Jan 13, 2018; 4:30 pm, ESPN3		at Western Michigan	L 58–73	11–6 (2–2)	University Arena (5,421); Kalamazoo, MI
Jan 16, 2018; 7:00 pm, ESPN3		Central Michigan	W 82–76	12–6 (3–2)	Worthen Arena (3,702); Muncie, IN
Jan 20, 2018; 3:30 pm, ESPN3		at Miami (OH)	L 53–71	12–7 (3–3)	Millett Hall (1,023); Oxford, OH
Jan 23, 2018; 7:00 pm, ESPN3		at Kent State	L 80–88 ^{OT}	12–8 (3–4)	MAC Center (2,430); Kent, OH
Jan 27, 2018; 12:00 pm, CBSSN		Akron	W 111–106 ^{2OT}	13–8 (4–4)	Worthen Arena (3,867); Muncie, IN
Jan 30, 2018; 7:00 pm, ESPN3		at Toledo	W 75–63	14–8 (5–4)	Savage Arena (4,227); Toledo, OH
Feb 3, 2018; 12:00 pm, ESPN3		at Eastern Michigan	L 41–58	14–9 (5–5)	Convocation Center (1,517); Ypsilanti, MI
Feb 6, 2018; 7:00 pm, ESPN3		Bowling Green	W 59–56	15–9 (6–5)	Worthen Arena (3,245); Muncie, IN
Feb 9, 2018; 9:00 pm, ESPNU		Kent State	W 87–68	16–9 (7–5)	Worthen Arena (4,105); Muncie, IN
Feb 13, 2018; 7:00 pm, ESPN3		at Akron	W 90–77	17–9 (8–5)	James A. Rhodes Arena (2,543); Akron, OH
Feb 17, 2018; 2:00 pm, ESPN3		Toledo	W 99–71	18–9 (9–5)	Worthen Arena (4,824); Muncie, IN
Feb 20, 2018; 7:00 pm, ESPN3		Northern Illinois	W 77–68	19–9 (10–5)	Worthen Arena (3,745); Muncie, IN
Feb 23, 2018; 9:00 pm, ESPN2		Western Michigan	L 80–87	19–10 (10–6)	Worthen Arena (5,924); Muncie, IN
Feb 27, 2018; 7:00 pm, ESPN3		at Central Michigan	L 51–75	19–11 (10–7)	McGuirk Arena (1,913); Mount Pleasant, MI
Mar 2, 2018; 7:00 pm, ESPN3		at Northern Illinois	L 65–66	19–12 (10–8)	Convocation Center (1,007); DeKalb, IL
MAC tournament
Mar 8, 2018; 2:30 pm, ESPN3	(4)	vs. (5) Kent State; Quarterfinals	L 73–76	19–13	Quicken Loans Arena (2,023); Cleveland, OH
*Non-conference game. ^{#}Rankings from AP Poll. (#) Tournament seedings in parentheses. All times are in Eastern Time Source.

== See also ==
- 2017–18 Ball State Cardinals women's basketball team
